= The Revenant Juke: A Collection of Fables and Farce =

Box set by Primus
- Released: September 2022
- Recorded: 1989–1999
- Length: 53:30
- Label: Third Man

Primus chronology
Conspiranoid (2022)	The Revenant Juke: A Collection of Fables and Farce (2022)	A Handful of Nuggs (2026)

The Revenant Juke: A Collection of Fables and Farce is a box set by the American rock band Primus, released in 2022 in collaboration with Third Man Records. It was distributed exclusively through the Third Man Vault Program subscription service.

== Background and contents ==
The box set consists of six 7" vinyl records; each contains two tracks and corresponds to one of Primus' first six studio albums. Original sleeve artwork for each record in the set was drawn by Adam Gates, who has also done previous work with the band.

== Track listing ==
Disc one

All lyrics are written by Les Claypool; all music is composed by Primus (Claypool, Larry LaLonde and Tim Alexander), except where noted.

No.	Title	Music	Original album	Length
1.	"John the Fisherman"	Claypool, Todd Huth, Alexander	Frizzle Fry	3:37
2.	"Too Many Puppies"		Frizzle Fry	3:57
Total length:				7:34

Disc two

No.	Title	Music	Original album	Length
1.	"Jerry Was a Race Car Driver"		Sailing the Seas of Cheese	3:10
2.	"Tommy the Cat"	Claypool, Huth, LaLonde, Alexander	Sailing the Seas of Cheese	4:15
Total length:				7:25

Disc three

No.	Title	Original album	Length
1.	"My Name is Mud"	Pork Soda	4:46
2.	"Mr. Krinkle"	Pork Soda	5:27
Total length:			10:13

Disc four

No.	Title	Original album	Length
1.	"Wynona's Big Brown Beaver"	Tales from the Punchbowl	4:24
2.	"Southbound Pachyderm"	Tales from the Punchbowl	6:22
Total length:			10:46

Disc five

No.	Title	Music	Original album	Length
1.	"Shake Hands with Beef"	Claypool, LaLonde, Bryan Mantia	Brown Album	4:02
2.	"Over the Falls"	Claypool	Brown Album	2:42
Total length:				6:44

Disc six

No.	Title	Music	Original album	Length
1.	"The Antipop"	Claypool, LaLonde, Mantia	Antipop	5:33
2.	"Coattails of a Dead Man"	Claypool, LaLonde, Mantia	Antipop	5:15
Total length:				10:48 (53:30)
