= They Can't All Be Zingers =

Greatest hits album by Primus
- Released: October 17, 2006
- Recorded: 1989–2003
- Genres: Funk metal, alternative rock, experimental rock, alternative metal
- Label: Interscope

Primus chronology
Animals Should Not Try To Act Like People (2003)	They Can't All Be Zingers (2006)	Green Naugahyde (2011)

Professional ratings
Review scores
Source	Rating
Allmusic	4/5 stars

They Can't All Be Zingers is a greatest hits compilation album by Primus. It was released through Interscope Records on October 17, 2006, the same day that their DVD Blame It on the Fish was released.

They Can't All Be Zingers includes 16 digitally remastered songs that span their entire career. Tracks include a previously unreleased and extended version of "Shake Hands With Beef", the Tom Waits collaboration "Coattails of a Dead Man", and "Mary the Ice Cube" from the 2003 DVD/EP Animals Should Not Try to Act Like People.

The Best Buy version of the album contains a bonus CD with four rare live tracks ("Those Damned Blue Collar Tweekers," "Bob," "My Name Is Mud," & "Jerry Was a Race Car Driver") recorded at Woodstock '94, including the infamous version of "My Name Is Mud" where they were pelted with mud by the audience (in which Claypool responds by informing them of their "small and insignificant genitalia").

The album's title comes from a line from the stand-up act of comedian Neil Hamburger. The CD is packaged with an outer cellophane cover meant to represent a package of individually wrapped single slices of processed cheese. The artwork for the inner booklet and the CD looks like cheese itself. The wedge of cheese pictured on the sleeve has the shape of the head in the frying pan from Frizzle Fry emerging from it.

== Track listing ==
All lyrics are written by Les Claypool; all music is composed by Primus (Claypool, Larry LaLonde and Tim Alexander), except where noted.

No.	Title	Music	Original album	Length
1.	"To Defy the Laws of Tradition"	Claypool, Todd Huth, Alexander	Frizzle Fry	6:41
2.	"John the Fisherman"	Claypool, Huth, Alexander	Frizzle Fry	3:37
3.	"Too Many Puppies"		Frizzle Fry	3:58
4.	"Jerry Was a Race Car Driver"		Sailing the Seas of Cheese	3:11
5.	"Those Damned Blue Collar Tweekers"		Sailing the Seas of Cheese	5:17
6.	"Tommy the Cat"	Claypool, Huth, LaLonde, Alexander	Sailing the Seas of Cheese	4:14
7.	"My Name Is Mud"		Pork Soda	4:45
8.	"Mr. Krinkle"		Pork Soda	5:25
9.	"DMV"		Pork Soda	4:56
10.	"Over the Electric Grapevine"		Tales from the Punchbowl	6:23
11.	"Wynona's Big Brown Beaver"		Tales from the Punchbowl	4:22
12.	"Southbound Pachyderm"		Tales from the Punchbowl	6:23
13.	"Over the Falls"	Claypool	Brown Album	2:41
14.	"Shake Hands with Beef" (Extended Version)	Claypool, LaLonde, Bryan “Brain” Mantia	Brown Album	4:23
15.	"Coattails of a Dead Man"	Claypool, LaLonde, Mantia	Antipop	5:17
16.	"Mary the Ice Cube"		Animals Should Not Try to Act Like People	4:37
Total length:				76:20

iTunes bonus track
No.	Title	Original album	Length
17.	"Mr. Knowitall" (Live)	Frizzle Fry	4:23
Total length:			80:43

Extra Cheese: Best Buy bonus tracks (recorded live at Woodstock 1994)
No.	Title	Original album	Length
17.	"Those Damned Blue Collar Tweekers"	Sailing the Seas of Cheese
18.	"Bob"	Pork Soda
19.	"My Name Is Mud"	Pork Soda
20.	"Jerry Was a Race Car Driver"	Sailing the Seas of Cheese
Total length:			98:36

== Personnel ==
- Les Claypool - bass guitar, vocals
- Larry LaLonde - guitar
- Tim "Herb" Alexander - drums on all tracks, except...
  - Bryan "Brain" Mantia - drums on "Shake Hands with Beef", "Over the Falls" and "Coattails of a Dead Man"
- Tom Waits - vocals on "Tommy the Cat", vocals and Chamberlin on "Coattails of a Dead Man"
- Martina Topley-Bird - vocals on "Coattails of a Dead Man"

Packaging and Design by Zoltron Illustration by Reuben Rude

== Charts ==
Album

Year	Chart	Position
2006	The Billboard 200	#105
