= Videoplasty =

Video by Primus
- Released: December 29, 1998
- Recorded: October 14, 1998
- Venue: The Phoenix Theater in Petaluma, California
- Length: 85 minutes
- Label: Interscope; Prawn Song
- Director: Les Claypool; Maurice Jacobsen (live footage)
- Producer: Raub Shapiro; Cheryl Rosenthal (live footage)

Primus video chronology
Cheesy Home Video (1992)	Videoplasty (1998)	Animals Should Not Try to Act Like People (2003)

Videoplasty is the third home video by Primus, following 1993's Cheesy Home Video and the fan club exclusive Horrible Swill. Videoplasty was released at the end of 1998 to complement the band's recent covers EP Rhinoplasty, and is composed mostly of highlights from a live show performed on October 14 that year at The Phoenix Theater in Petaluma, California. This live footage is interspersed with montages of clips filmed during previous tours and at other recent shows, footage shot backstage and in the studio, animations by bassist Les Claypool, and the band's then-current music videos, spanning the previous two years back to the recording of the Brown Album and presented in approximate reverse-chronological order.

== Track listing ==
1. "To Defy the Laws of Tradition"
2. "Groundhog's Day"
3. Rhinoplasty Recording Session
4. Sno-Core Tour Fall 1998
5. "Kalamazoo"
6. "Too Many Puppies" / "Hello Skinny"
7. In the Studio with the Dust Brothers for [the] Orgazmo Movie
8. Recording with Rick Rubin for [the] South Park Album
9. Primus and Spearhead [at the] Benefit for Calder Spanier
10. "Tommy the Cat" (partial) / Europe Summer 1997 / Australia Spring 1998
11. DJ Disk and Brain jam / "Tommy the Cat" (reprise)
12. The Pitfalls of Eating Your Own Genitalia (animation)
13. "Seas of Cheese" / "Over the Falls" (intro)
14. "Over the Falls" (music video) - Directed by Les Claypool
15. The Making of the "Over the Falls" Music Video
16. Primus Records with Tom Waits in 1997
17. "Bob's Party Time Lounge"
18. New Year's Eve Dec. 31, 1997
19. US Tour Fall 1997
20. "Those Damned Blue-Collar Tweekers"
21. The H.O.R.D.E. Tour Summer 1997
22. The Skeeter Drinks the Taboo Fluid and Enters the World of the Undead (animation)
23. "Shake Hands with Beef" (music video) - Directed by Les Claypool
24. The Making of [the] "Shake Hands with Beef" Video
25. The Making of the Brown Album
26. "Here Come the Bastards"
27. Credits
28. "The Devil Went Down to Georgia" (music video) - Directed by Mike Johnson

=== Notes ===
- All songs written by Primus, except "Hello Skinny" by The Residents and "The Devil Went Down to Georgia" by the Charlie Daniels Band.
- Calder Spanier was the saxophonist for Charlie Hunter's band. He was killed in a road accident in December, 1997.
- The song seen being recorded with Tom Waits is a cover of Jack Kerouac's track "On the Road" for the compilation album Jack Kerouac Reads On the Road. It was also later included on Waits' collection Orphans: Brawlers, Bawlers & Bastards.
- 2003's Animals Should Not Try to Act Like People DVD includes the three music videos from Videoplasty together with the "Making of the Brown Album" segment.
- Design by Zoltron

== Personnel ==
- Les Claypool - bass, vocals
- Larry LaLonde - guitar
- Bryan "Brain" Mantia - drums
- DJ Disk - turntables on the DJ Disk and Brain jam / "Tommy the Cat" (reprise) and "Here Come the Bastards"
- Buckethead - guitar on "Those Damned Blue-Collar Tweekers", stage theatrics during the DJ Disk and Brain jam and "Here Come the Bastards"
- "The Devil Went Down to Georgia" performed by Festus Clamrod and The El Sobrante Twangers
  - Les Claypool - vocals and bass
  - Larry LaLonde - banjo
  - Bryan "Brain" Mantia - drums
  - Mark "Mirv" Haggard - slide guitar and voice of Johnny
  - Bryan Kehoe - voice of the Devil
  - Violina Misteriosa - violin
