= Rhinoplasty (EP) =

EP by Primus
- Released: August 11, 1998
- Studios: Prairie Sun (Cotati, California)
- Genres: Progressive rock; funk metal; funk
- Length: 48:38
- Labels: Interscope, Prawn Song
- Producers: Primus, Toby Wright

Primus chronology
Brown Album (1997)	Rhinoplasty (1998)	Antipop (1999)

Singles from Rhinoplasty
- 1. "Behind My Camel" Released: 1998

Rhinoplasty is an extended play record by Primus. It was released August 11, 1998, by Interscope Records and features covers of songs by artists such as Stanley Clarke, Metallica, and Jerry Reed. The CD also features an interactive CD-ROM which includes the claymation video for "The Devil Went Down to Georgia". The 2018 digital remaster and vinyl reissue includes "The Devil Went Down to Georgia" as the eighth track.

The live version of "Tommy the Cat" is performed with "The Awakening" in the middle. The original song was by The Reddings from their 1980 album The Awakening; the song had previously been covered by Les Claypool and the Holy Mackerel on their album Highball with the Devil.

== Cover art ==
The cover art features a clay figure sculpted by Claypool. The Japanese katakana characters to the far right are ostensibly a translation of the EP's title, however, when read phonetically they spell out "Nesesotonanitsukinoha", a completely nonsensical word.

== Critical reception ==
Professional ratings
Review scores
Source	Rating
AllMusic	3/5 stars
Pitchfork Media	(7.4/10)

In his review for AllMusic, Stephen Thomas Erlewine describes the EP as "another small treasure for fans." He notes that "the band hasn't chosen any surprising covers" but "makes up for it with great performances" and "startling arrangements that are often unpredictable", concluding that "it doesn't disappoint." For Pitchfork Media, Susan Moll notes that "while Brian [sic] "Brain" Mantia's heavy-hitting drums were the focus of The Brown Album, Rhinoplasty marks a return to the vintage Primus sound, with Claypool's bass front and center, where it belongs." She also opines that "the band's version of "Making Plans For Nigel" (from Miscellaneous Debris) is legendary, but their take on "Scissor Man" is more deranged than Andy Partridge on a bad day."

== Track listing ==
No.	Title	Writer(s)	Length
1.	"Scissor Man" (XTC cover)	Andy Partridge	5:06
2.	"The Family and the Fishing Net" (Peter Gabriel cover)	Peter Gabriel	6:25
3.	"Silly Putty" (Stanley Clarke cover)	Stanley Clarke	4:19
4.	"Amos Moses" (Jerry Reed cover)	J. R. Hubbard	3:11
5.	"Behind My Camel" (The Police cover)	Andy Summers	2:51
6.	"Too Many Puppies" (Rerecorded version, originally from Primus' album Frizzle Fry)	Les Claypool, Larry LaLonde, Tim Alexander	3:01
7.	"The Thing That Should Not Be" (Metallica cover)	James Hetfield, Lars Ulrich, Kirk Hammett	6:44
8.	"Tommy the Cat" (Live at the Henry J. Kaiser Arena, December 31, 1997)	Claypool, Todd Huth, LaLonde, Alexander	8:56
9.	"Bob's Party Time Lounge" (Live at the Henry J. Kaiser Arena, December 31, 1997)	Claypool, LaLonde, Brian Mantia	7:32
Total length:			48:05

CD-ROM and 2018 remastered digital/vinyl bonus track
No.	Title	Writer(s)	Length
8.	"The Devil Went Down to Georgia" (The Charlie Daniels Band cover)	Charlie Daniels; Tom Crain; "Taz" DiGregorio; Fred Edwards; Charles Hayward; James W Marshall	4:35
Total length:			52:40

== Charts ==
Chart (1998)	Peak position
Australian Albums Chart	81
Dutch Albums Chart	97
Billboard 200	106
