= Lance Montoya =

American sculptor

Lance "Link" Montoya, artist and sculptor, was born and raised in Alameda, California, United States.

== Biography ==
As a teenager, Lance worked with Les Claypool, of Primus fame, at a Bay Area pro audio company. Amused by Link's art style, Claypool asked him to come up with something for the Primus album Suck on This. Influenced by his older brother's collection of Creepy and Eerie magazines, Lance's oddball art style almost landed him in the psychiatry couch in middle school. School officials concerned about an early cartoon character, a chain saw wielding maniac called "Gut Man", contacted his mother to schedule a session. His older brother was able to convince their mother that he wasn't mentally twisted, just creative.

One of only two album cover artists to have more than one album cover (three to be exact) featured in Juxtapoz Art & Culture Magazine magazines "Top 500 Album Covers" the other being Roger Dean of Yes fame.

He occasionally produces commercial sculpture, but the majority are for his personal collection. Link has been commissioned to create sculpture for "The Hundreds" urban clothing line based out of Los Angeles, California.

== Trivia ==
- Only Primus albums displaying or containing Montoya's work have had RIAA certification for Gold and Platinum
- On the cover of Animals Should Not Try to Act Like People the name Link is written in the waistband of the boxer on the right.

== Selected list of works ==
- Suck on This
- Frizzle Fry
- Sailing the Seas of Cheese
- Pork Soda insert art for "My Name Is Mud"
- Tales from the Punchbowl insert art for "Southbound Pachyderm"
- Animals Should Not Try to Act Like People DVD / EP
