= Green Naugahyde =

Studio album by Primus
- Released: September 12, 2011
- Recorded: October 2010– April 2011 (Note: In March 2011, Claypool said of the album "we've finished it, we just need to polish it". In May, he simply stated "it's finished".)
- Studios: Rancho Relaxo, Sebastopol, California
- Genres: Funk rock, experimental rock
- Length: 50:46
- Labels: ATO, Prawn Song
- Producer: Les Claypool

Primus chronology
June 2010 Rehearsal (2010)	Green Naugahyde (2011)	Primus & the Chocolate Factory with the Fungi Ensemble (2014)

Singles from Green Naugahyde
- 1. "Tragedy's a' Comin'" Released: 2011; 2. "Lee van Cleef" Released: 2011

Green Naugahyde is the seventh studio album by rock group Primus, released by ATO Records and Prawn Song on September 12, 2011, in Europe, and on September 13, 2011, in the United States. It is the band's first album since 1999's Antipop, and features their first new material since 2003's Animals Should Not Try to Act Like People EP. It is the only Primus album to feature Jay Lane on drums, as he left the band in September 2013.

The album's title comes from the lyrics to the song "Lee Van Cleef", which describes a group of friends watching movies featuring Lee Van Cleef and Clint Eastwood, and driving a yellow Studebaker with a green Naugahyde interior.

== Background ==
Primus had been on recording hiatus since 2003, with the trio's members working on a variety of other projects.

Green Naugahyde is the only Primus album to feature drummer Jay Lane alongside perennial bassist/vocalist Les Claypool and guitarist Larry LaLonde. Lane had previously been a member for a brief period in 1988 with Claypool and original guitarist Todd Huth, and has been involved with a number of Claypool's side projects, such as The Holy Mackerel, Colonel Les Claypool's Fearless Flying Frog Brigade, and Sausage, which was itself a reunion of the 1988 Primus lineup. Claypool has stated that "[Lane] coming back has just breathed life back into the project. We did some touring, and we decided, "Let's go make a record," because we were creating things on the road." He also stated:

I wasn’t that excited about doing Primus again, but Larry and I were hanging out, and that friendship was rekindled. It was very apparent that it wasn’t going to happen with [then former drummer] Tim Alexander, and he wasn’t that excited about doing things again. So, we talked to Jay Lane, and we actually had a jam with Jay Lane, and he brought this huge ball of energy back into the room from the very second he started playing, and that's the main reason we’re doing it again. There's this creative flow again that hasn’t been there in a long time.

== Promotion ==
In interviews conducted in March and April 2011, Primus gave the album an estimated street date of May. In May, Claypool revealed that the album was complete and had been named Green Naugahyde; further, although the band had been "shooting for June", they chose to push it back to July to avoid conflict with the holiday season. Finally, it was announced in June through a press release that the date had been settled in September.

On August 17, the track "Tragedy's a' Comin'" was made available to stream via the Spin magazine website, followed by "HOINFODAMAN" on September 1 via the Rolling Stone site. On September 6, Primus released a teaser trailer featuring audio clips from Green Naugahyde set to video footage of the "astronaut" character from the album's artwork. From September 7–12, the TV show South Park made the entire album available for streaming to anybody who "liked" their Facebook page, including the iTunes bonus live track "Those Damned Blue-Collar Tweekers".

=== Music videos ===
==== "Tragedy's a' Comin'" ====
Three music videos have been released to promote the album. The first was made for the track "Tragedy's a' Comin'"; co-directed by Claypool and Mark Kohr, who had previously directed a number of the band's videos in the early 1990s. It depicts kitchen staff preparing lobsters in a chic restaurant, which are then served to diners by the maître d’, played by Kohr. The scene is keenly observed by one of the lobsters waiting to be cooked, and intercut with a fantasy sequence of that lobster imagining itself alone on a remote beach, played by Claypool. Throughout the video, an anonymous figure is shown riding a horse while wearing a space suit, who eventually arrives at the restaurant and orders the lobster, which is then cooked and served to them. Other scenes include some of the restaurant's diners spontaneously breaking out into dance, joined by the maître d’, and footage of the band members playing their instruments individually, each superimposed with stylised outlines of the other members animated over a panning photograph of more lobsters.

Claypool said of the video, "Musically, it's upbeat, but lyrically, the song is all about impending doom... But to depict that would have been the cliché thing to do, so we’ve got lobsters." The video premiered on November 17, 2011, via the Independent Film Channel website, before being uploaded to Primus' official YouTube channel on December 14.

==== "Lee Van Cleef" ====
"Lee Van Cleef" was the second track to receive a music video, animated by the award-winning Mixtape Club. It begins by showing a decomposing body hanging from a tree, which twitches before falling to the ground in pieces. The corpse then reanimates and reassembles itself, and heads off towards a small western town to seek revenge on their sheriff, who is repeatedly shown waiting in the jailhouse, polishing his revolver. Along the way, the corpse horrifies and disgusts a number of civilians, and is revealed to have been a criminal identified as "L.V.C." on his wanted poster. As the corpse reaches the jailhouse, he and the sheriff enter into a stand-off, and though the sheriff draws first and fires several times, the corpse overpowers him. The sheriff is then strung up by his ankles as the corpse takes his badge and staggers off towards the sunset on the horizon, and it is revealed that the video was in fact a movie at a drive-in theater that is being booed by the patrons, except for one young boy who applauds the film right before his left arm is shot, potentially by the zombie of Van Cleef.

The corpse and sheriff characters in the video resemble the Spaghetti Western actors Lee Van Cleef and Clint Eastwood, respectively, as they appeared in Sergio Leone's Dollars Trilogy. The video premiered on May 21, 2012, via Conan O'Brien's website, TeamCoco.com, and its associated YouTube channel. It was eventually uploaded to the official YouTube channel of ATO Records on June 27.

==== "Jilly's on Smack" ====
"Jilly's on Smack" was the third song from Green Naugahyde to be given a music video, this time directed by Jordan Copeland. It is made up of clips of the band playing live on stage, intercut with found footage of "family life, with a holiday theme." Some clips that are repeatedly featured include children sledding down a snowy hill, parents organising wrapped presents around Christmas trees, and a drumming monkey toy among others in Santa Claus' workshop.

Claypool has described the lyrics of "Jilly's on Smack" as being about a friend who "disappeared into the world of heroin," and has said that the use of found footage in the video reflects the song's theme. "Oftentimes it is the parents, grandparents, siblings, etc., that feel the brunt of the heartache as they look at that empty dinner chair or Christmas stocking". The video premiered on December 19, 2012, via the Rolling Stone website.

==== "HOINFODAMAN" contest ====
In early 2013, Primus announced that they would be holding a contest for fans to make a music video for "HOINFODAMAN" on YouTube. Team HiHo were announced as the winners on March 18 via the band's official Facebook page.

== Style and themes ==
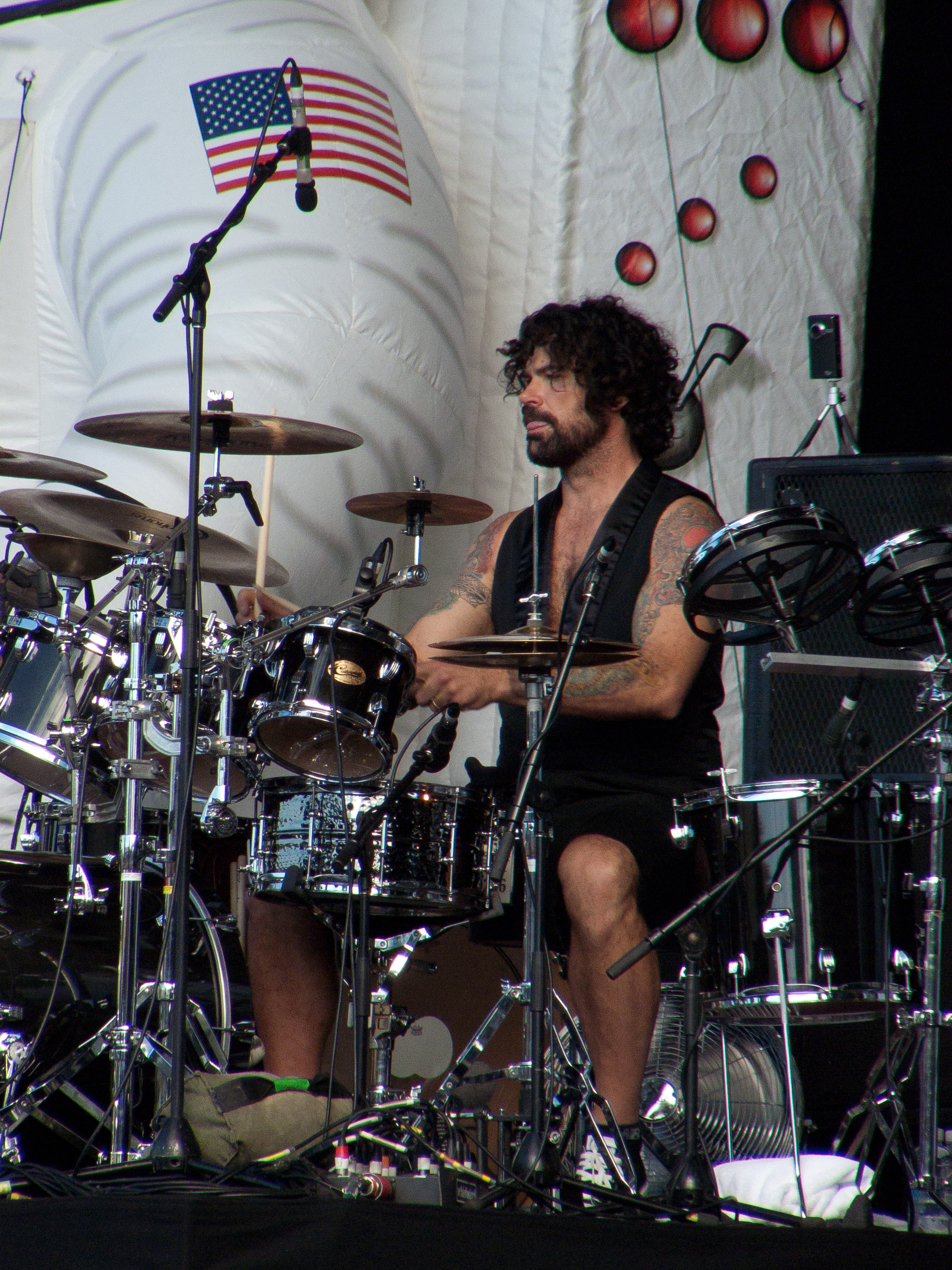
Jay Lane is said to have strongly influenced the band's sound, "harkening to the old Frizzle Fry days" while also making them "way funkier than [they] ever were".

Claypool has described the new material as being reminiscent of Frizzle Fry, Primus' 1990 debut studio album, due largely to Lane's involvement: "If I were to look at all of our records, it seems like this is reminiscent of the early stuff. Obviously, with Jay there's a newness to it, but because he left the band right before we recorded our first record, his approach has an eerie harkening to the old Frizzle Fry days." He said of the album's lyrical content:

[I]t's also got 20 years of life experience on it – from many different angles. A song like "Jilly's on Smack" just wouldn't have been written in the early Nineties, because we hadn't lost a friend to heroin addiction. A song like "Lee Van Cleef" which is reflective of my youth just wouldn't have been written back then.

Claypool has stated that "'Eyes of the Squirrel' is a strong commentary on visual media. Television. It's just that the title has the word ‘squirrel’ in it, [laughs] and that tends to throw people. In Primus, there's always something being spoken about via some colourful character, and a lot of times colourful character that will distract people who don't scratch the surface."

"Tragedy's a' Comin'"

Claypool has stated that Lane has made the band "funkier" than they previously had been: "I was embarrassed for many years when people would call Primus a funk band... We were never funky. We're funky now. With Jaysky in the band, I feel that we're way funkier than we ever were... So on songs like "Tragedy" and "Lee Van Cleef", I have no problem saying we're funky, because Jaysky's the funkiest guy I've ever played with – and I've played with some very funky dudes!"

== Critical reception ==
Professional ratings
Aggregate scores
Source	Rating
Metacritic	75/100
Review scores
Source	Rating
Allmusic	4/5 stars
Consequence of Sound	4/5 stars
IGN	8.5/10
Now	4/5 stars
Paste	8.0
PopMatters	6/10
Rolling Stone	3/5 stars
The Skinny	4/5 stars
Spin	5/10
USA Today	2.5/4 stars

Green Naugahyde received generally positive reviews on Metacritic.

In his review for Allmusic, Gregory Heaney commends the band for continually being "able to push the envelope creatively", describing the new material as "both technically dazzling and perfectly irreverent." He wrote that Lane's return has affected the band's sound, saying that "the album feels like Primus are getting back to basics... evoking the directness of Frizzle Fry... recapturing the magic of those earlier albums", and concludes that Green Naugahyde "will satisfy those in the know while continuing, as Primus always have, to baffle the uninitiated." Blare Magazine's Dan Rankin describes the album as "the sonic equivalent of being approached on a dark street by a strange panhandler beckoning you down a dark alley", writing that "it's just the sort of feeling that Primus fans seek out... and precisely the kind of thing most non-fans would prefer to do without, thank you very much."

Scott McLennan, for The Boston Globe, describes the album as having "all of the absurd contours and whimsical tones one expects" from a Primus record, though "overall, the writing is richer", and "the band's twisted humor keeps things provocative." Consequence of Sound reviewer David Buchanan describes the new material as both "funky nightmare rock" and "bouncy grooves direct from Wonka's boat ride." He wrote that "Green Naugahyde couldn’t be exclusively classified as a new page in the band's history, because there is so much of the past scrambled in, deliberately or otherwise", concluding that "much like Primus’ musical territory, we have yet another gray area that defies the laws of tradition, which instead of reinventing the wheel gives it a fresh coat of paint." IGN's Chad Grischow describes the album as "sharply written social commentary" wrapped up in "the band's dark, bass-heavy brand of sonic strange." He sums up by saying that "there is nothing quite like Primus, and the first new album in over a decade reminds you what a gaping hole they create in the rock landscape when they are missing."

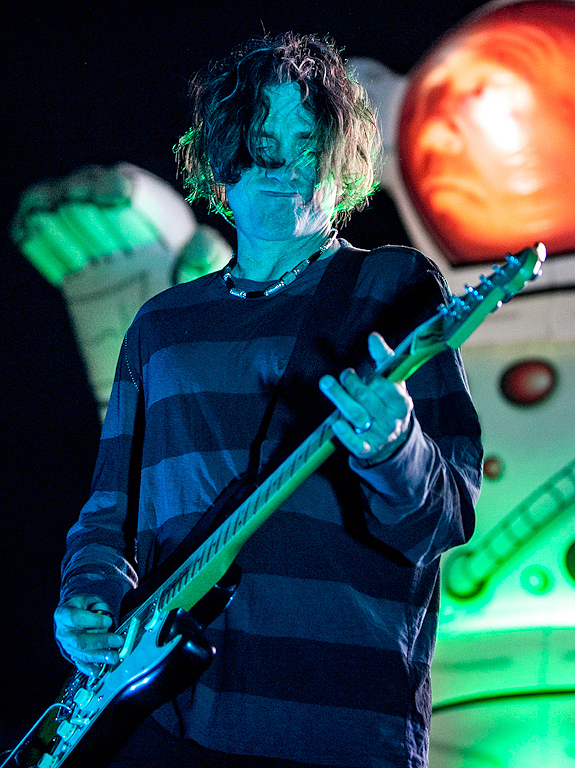
Larry LaLonde has been criticised for adopting "Andy Summers downbeat duty" instead of his usual "atonal death-Zappa theatrics."

In his review for Now, Benjamin Boles wrote that "'Wacky' isn't supposed to be a good thing any more, but being unfashionable has never stopped bass guitar abuser Les Claypool before, and that's exactly why Green Naugahyde works." He concludes by describing the album as "a great introduction for new ears and a satisfying addition to the catalogue for long-time fans." Reviewing the album for Paste, Ryan Carey describes Green Naugahyde as "a thoroughly enjoyable Primus album", writing that it is "perhaps the first Primus album to avoid settling into a subgenre, but rather taking from all the styles in Primus' back catalog... resulting in a significantly more solid album than many of their efforts", although "the flip-side to this buffet approach is that it's their first disc in a long while which doesn’t have that one or two tracks which simply annihilate your entire notion of what music can be." For PopMatters, Chris Conaton describes the album as sounding "pretty much exactly like what you'd expect a Primus album to sound like... Green Naugahyde is a perfectly serviceable Primus record", writing that the album "relies a little too much on the band's past material for inspiration, but with Lane on the drums, the songs have a lot of drive to them and Claypool and LaLonde are clearly having fun." Bill Murphy, for Relix, wrote that "for the first third of the album, [LaLonde] and [Lane] just seem to be warming up", but that the overall album is "as accessible as it is willfully in-your-face, this is vintage Primus."

David Fricke's review for Rolling Stone sees him describe Green Naugahyde as "more a series of creepy pranks than a set of tunes", but wrote that the band themselves are "a tight knotty rhythm team". The Skinny's David Bowes describes the album as "a surprisingly consistent and rewarding listen", writing that "there's little here that wouldn’t work in the context of some freakish nightmare concoted by celebrated hoaxer P.T. Barnum." Christopher R. Weingarten, for Spin, describes the album as "all rubbery... missing practically everything that made them unlikely belles of the Headbangers Ball: the maddening 11/4 prog mutations, the heavy-metal muscle, the dissonant oddball skronk." He attributes this to a lack of LaLonde's usual "atonal death-Zappa theatrics", writing that Claypool and Lane "ensure that the band's goony cartoon-octopus funk abounds." USA Today reviewer Brian Mansfield predicts that fans of Primus will appreciate the album, writing that the "slap-funk grooves hark back to the band's 1990 debut, Frizzle Fry", but concedes that "those who don't appreciate [Claypool]'s complex chops and whimsy may find Green Naugahyde nearly unlistenable."

In a 2015 Noisey interview, Les Claypool rates Green Naugahyde as his fourth favorite Primus album, stating, "I really like Green Naugahyde. We play a lot of that material these days". Claypool also elaborates on positive memories associated with the return of drummer Jay Lane, who briefly played for Primus in 1988 before leaving the band. In addition, Claypool mentions how Primus' hiatus from 2000 to 2010 made the production process of the album especially enjoyable, as demonstrated when he remarks, "Having that time from 2000 to 2010 for us to—obviously, I went off and did a ton of stuff, and everybody did their thing, and then coming back with Jay Lane, who has always been my guy as far as go-to drummers, we were very excited and fired up to make that record".

== Track listing ==
All lyrics are written by Les Claypool.

No.	Title	Music	Length
1.	"Prelude to a Crawl"	Claypool	1:20
2.	"Hennepin Crawler"	Claypool, Larry LaLonde, Jay Lane	4:00
3.	"Last Salmon Man" (Fisherman's Chronicles, Part IV)	Claypool	6:15
4.	"Eternal Consumption Engine"	LaLonde	2:45
5.	"Tragedy's a' Comin'"	Claypool, LaLonde, Lane	4:52
6.	"Eyes of the Squirrel"	Claypool, Lane	5:32
7.	"Jilly's on Smack"	Claypool, LaLonde	6:36
8.	"Lee Van Cleef"	Claypool	3:28
9.	"Moron TV"	Claypool, LaLonde, Lane	4:38
10.	"Green Ranger"	Claypool, Lane	2:02
11.	"HOINFODAMAN"	LaLonde	3:00
12.	"Extinction Burst"	Claypool, LaLonde, Lane	5:20
13.	"Salmon Men"	Claypool	0:58
Total length:			50:46

iTunes bonus track
No.	Title	Music	Length
14.	"Those Damned Blue-Collar Tweekers" (Recorded live on July 13th, 2011, in London, England)	Claypool, LaLonde, Tim Alexander	8:10
Total length:			58:56

== Personnel ==
- Les Claypool – vocals, bass, upright bass
- Larry LaLonde – guitar
- Jay Lane – drums
- Produced and engineered by Les Claypool
- Live section from "Tragedy's a' Comin'" recorded by Jason Mills
- Mastered by Stephen Marcussen for Marcussen Mastering
- Zoltron – design and layout

== Chart history ==
Chart (2011)	Peak position
Australian Albums (ARIA)	139
Belgian Albums (Ultratop Flanders)	84
Belgian Albums (Ultratop Wallonia)	95
Canadian Albums (Billboard)	24
Canadian Albums (Jam!)	27
Dutch Albums (Album Top 100)	62
Finnish Albums (Suomen virallinen lista)	21
German Albums (Offizielle Top 100)	100
Swiss Albums (Schweizer Hitparade)	74
UK Albums (Official Charts Company)	115
US Billboard 200	15
US Digital Albums (Billboard)	18
US Independent Albums (Billboard)	4
US Top Alternative Albums (Billboard)	4
US Top Rock Albums (Billboard)	7
