= Suck on This =

Live album by Primus
- Released: November 1989
- Recorded: February 25 and March 5, 1989
- Venues: Berkeley Square (Berkeley, California)
- Genres: Art rock; progressive rock; funk metal; alternative metal
- Length: 41:11
- Label: Prawn Song
- Producers: Matt Winegar; Bob Cock

Primus chronology
Suck on This (1989)	Frizzle Fry (1990)

Suck on This is a live album and first release by the American rock band Primus, released in 1989. At the time of recording, the featured lineup of bassist/vocalist Les Claypool, guitarist Larry LaLonde and drummer Tim Alexander had only been playing together for "about two months". This release, along with Jane's Addiction's self-titled live album, are seen as popularizing the then-underground alternative metal genre.

== Background ==
The album was recorded live at the Berkeley Square in Berkeley, California on February 25 and March 5, 1989, on a TASCAM quarter-inch 8-track Portastudio and mixed on Hi-Fi VHS. The band borrowed $3,000 from Claypool's father to cover the recording and pressing of one thousand copies of the album for its initial limited run. They released the record in November 1989 through their own independent label under the name Prawn Song Records before licensing it to Caroline Records in 1990, and later Interscope Records. On April 23, 2002, Prawn Song reissued the album with remastered audio, together with the follow-up studio album Frizzle Fry.

All of the songs would eventually be released as studio recordings: "Tommy the Cat" on Sailing the Seas of Cheese in 1991, "Pressman" (as "The Pressman") on Pork Soda in 1993, "Jellikit" on the Airheads soundtrack in 1994 as "Bastardizing Jellikit", and "The Heckler" on Antipop in 1999 as a hidden track. All other tracks were included on the band's debut studio album Frizzle Fry in 1990.

The original liner notes give "hugs and kisses" to a number of bands and local businesses, including Faith No More and Buck Naked and the Bare Bottom Boys. This was followed by "special hugs and kisses" to a number of individuals, including early Primus members Todd Huth, Jay Lane, Vince Parker and Tim Wright, and "Pops" (Claypool's father) "for kickin' down the corn". For the 2002 reissue, these sections were omitted in favour of a paragraph written by Claypool detailing the history of the record, leaving only "special thanks" to Claypool's father.

== Critical reception ==
Professional ratings
Review scores
Source	Rating
AllMusic	3.5/5 stars
The Daily Vault	B+
Spin Alternative Record Guide	7/10

Reviewing the album for AllMusic, Ned Raggett describes the album as "not only demonstrating Primus' undeniable live flair for art/prog rock/funk of its own devising, but capturing an already rabid fan base getting off on it big-time", with "its tempo-shifting riffing and Funkadelic-meets-Rush rhythm explosions benefiting from a fairly crisp recording." He notes that "Claypool's voice is sometimes searching for breath or a touch buried in the mix", but "anyone who likes the Zappa/Beefheart goofy voice approach Claypool is fond of will be perfectly happy with his nutty lip-flapping".

== Track listing ==
All lyrics are written by Les Claypool; music credits adapted from the Songview database; guitar melodies by Todd Huth except "The Heckler" and "Pressman".

No.	Title	Music	Length
1.	"John the Fisherman"	Claypool, Huth, Tim Alexander	3:53
2.	"Groundhog's Day"	Claypool, Huth, Alexander	4:53
3.	"The Heckler"	Claypool, Larry LaLonde, Alexander	3:35
4.	"Pressman"	Claypool, LaLonde, Alexander	5:01
5.	"Jellikit"	Claypool, Huth, Alexander	3:59
6.	"Tommy the Cat"	Claypool, Huth, LaLonde, Alexander	5:27
7.	"Pudding Time"	Claypool, Huth, Alexander	4:20
8.	"Harold of the Rocks"	Claypool, Huth, Alexander	6:18
9.	"Frizzle Fry"	Claypool, Huth, LaLonde, Alexander	5:45
Total length:			41:11

=== Notes ===
- "John the Fisherman" contains an excerpt from the instrumental "YYZ" by Rush.

== Personnel ==
Credits for Suck on This adapted from liner notes.

Primus

- Les Claypool – vocals, bass
- Larry "Ler" LaLonde – guitars
- Tim "Herb" Alexander – drums

Production

- Matt Winegar – producer, engineer, mixing engineer
- Bob Cock – producer
- John Golden – mastering
- Howard Johnston – editing
- Tim "Soya" – stage
- Leroy – stage
- Lauren Miller – live sound

Visual art

- Paul Haggard – jacket design, photos
- Lance "Link" Montoya – sculpture
