= Southbound Pachyderm =

Promotional single by Primus

from the album Tales from the Punchbowl
- Released: 1996
- Studio: Rancho Relaxo (Sebastopol, California)
- Genre: Progressive rock, art rock
- Length: 6:21
- Label: Interscope
- Songwriters: Les Claypool; Larry LaLonde; Tim Alexander
- Producer: Primus

Primus singles chronology
"Mrs. Blaileen" (1996)	"Southbound Pachyderm" (1996)	"Shake Hands with Beef" (1997)

"Southbound Pachyderm" is a song by the American rock band Primus. It was released as a promotional single from their fourth studio album, Tales from the Punchbowl (1995). A stop-motion animated music video was made for it. The song is about the extinction threat faced by elephants, rhinos and hippos, otherwise known as pachyderms.

Les Claypool said in 2015 that "Southbound Pachyderm" is one of his favorite songs to play live.

== Background ==
The inspiration for the song came from an image that CMJ New Music Monthly said Claypool "couldn't shake ... 'an elephant's ass heading away from you'". Claypool would later say, "Years ago I had this vision of an elephant walking away, just this big elephant's ass basically, and then it sort of turned into the idea of all the pachyderms that are disappearing, all the rhinos, hippos and elephants that we're killing off. They're slowly disappearing, going south."

== Music videos ==
Two music videos exist for the song. The first version was included in the CD+ Enhanced CD version of the album, which allowed a computer's CD-ROM to access enhanced aspects of the album, namely becoming a tug boat captain that allowed one to explore different parts of the punchbowl world. It was a pastiche of San Francisco, elephants with propellers and wings, and psychedelic imagery. It is currently not published, although such version can be viewed online.

The official music video for the song is in entirely stop-motion with the band (in live action) appearing on TV screens. For the stop motion story, it features elephants being stalked by poachers but are saved at the last moment by several scientists. At the climax of the video, the scientists and the elephants (along with some hippos and rhinos) then escape from their laboratory when the poachers begin to attack via orders from their leader.

Claypool came up with the idea for the video and included regular character Flouncin' Fred. The video reflects Claypool's concern over the conservation status of pachyderms. He and Raub Shapiro co-directed the video. Shapiro had previously produced the video for "Wynona's Big Brown Beaver". Claypool initially worked on storyboards for the video but moved on to foam sculptures when he found that medium easier to express his ideas. Raub then did storyboards, and they handed the work to animators, who used stop motion photography. Animation was slow work; Claypool said that the studio was only able to produce six to ten seconds of footage per day, and the video took six weeks to complete.

== Legacy ==
Claypool later referenced the song in a pinot noir wine called Purple Pachyderm.

== Track listing ==
1. "Southbound Pachyderm (Radio Edit)" - 4:00
2. "Wynona's Big Brown Beaver" - 4:24
3. "Jerry Was A Race Car Driver" - 3:11
4. "Those Damned Blue Collar Tweekers" - 5:18
5. "My Name Is Mud" - 4:40
