= John the Fisherman =

Song by Primus

from the album Frizzle Fry
- Released: February 7, 1990
- Recorded: December 1989
- Studio: Different Fur (San Francisco)
- Genre: Funk metal
- Length: 3:37
- Label: Caroline
- Songwriters: Les Claypool; Todd Huth; Tim Alexander
- Producers: Primus; Matt Winegar

"John the Fisherman" is a song by American rock band Primus. It is the sixth track on the band's debut studio album, Frizzle Fry (1990).

The band's frontman Les Claypool said of the song:

"John the Fisherman" was written so long ago. I like to write about things I know about so that I don’t sound like a dipshit talking over my head. I fish. Some dads take their kids to football games or baseball games. My dad took me fishing. That’s what we did, almost every weekend. My uncle, my grandfather, that’s what we did. It’s a big part of my history. So, for me, it was always easy to write about. These fishing songs kept popping up, themes about the ocean, and it made it like a chronicle, a subdivision of our body of work.

The live version of "John the Fisherman" that appears on Suck on This interpolates the intro to the 1981 Rush instrumental "YYZ".

== Fisherman's Chronicles ==
"John the Fisherman" is the first part of a four-part story called the "Fisherman's Chronicles", which continued on Primus' later albums. Its immediate sequel was "Fish On (Fisherman Chronicles, Chapter II)" on 1991's Sailing the Seas of Cheese, followed by "The Ol' Diamondback Sturgeon (Fisherman's Chronicles, Pt. 3)" on 1993's Pork Soda and most recently "Last Salmon Man" on 2011's Green Naugahyde.

== Personnel ==
- Les Claypool - vocals, bass guitar
- Larry LaLonde - guitars
- Tim Alexander - drums, percussion
- Trouz Cuevas, Mike Bordin, Clem Donahue, Deanne Franklin, Brain Mantia, Flipjax Libby, Smiley - backing vocals

== Reception ==
AllMusic writer Ned Raggett thought that the song "probably remains the most concentrated blast" on the album.
