= Miscellaneous Debris =

EP by Primus
- Released: March 12, 1992
- Studio: Coast Records (San Francisco, California)
- Genre: Progressive rock; experimental rock; funk rock
- Length: 18:07
- Label: Interscope
- Producer: Primus

Primus chronology
Sailing the Seas of Cheese (1991)	Miscellaneous Debris (1992)	Pork Soda (1993)

Singles from Miscellaneous Debris
- 1. "Making Plans for Nigel" Released: 1992

Miscellaneous Debris is an EP of five cover songs by Primus, released on March 12, 1992. The EP is the first release by the band to feature Les Claypool playing his fretless six-string Carl Thompson bass, nicknamed the "Rainbow Bass".

== Reception ==
=== Critical reception ===
Professional ratings
Review scores
Source	Rating
AllMusic	4/5 stars
The Daily Vault	A

In his review for AllMusic, Stephen Thomas Erlewine describes the EP as "Primus' best release". He notes that the band "plays actual songs instead of sketching out a few ideas as an excuse for jamming", which means that "Miscellaneous Debris isn't as weird and alienating as previous albums", concluding that the band's covers "show flashes of brilliance, largely due to the loose yet focused musicianship."

=== Chart performance ===
Miscellaneous Debris peaked at number 69 on the Australian ARIA singles chart in May 1994. Although the EP never charted on the Billboard 200, its sole single "Making Plans for Nigel" peaked at number 30 on the Modern Rock Tracks chart February 15, 1992.

== Track listing ==
No.	Title	Writer(s)	Original artist	Length
1.	"Intruder"	Peter Gabriel	Peter Gabriel	4:18
2.	"Making Plans for Nigel"	Colin Moulding	XTC	3:30
3.	"Sinister Exaggerator"	The Residents	The Residents	3:34
4.	"Tippi Toes"	The Meters	The Meters	1:24
5.	"Have a Cigar"	Roger Waters	Pink Floyd	5:27
Total length:				18:07

== Credits ==
Writing, performance and production credits are adapted from the album liner notes.

Primus

- Les Claypool – six-string fretless bass, kazoo, vocals
- Larry "Ler" LaLonde – guitar
- Tim "Herb" Alexander – drums

Production

- Primus – production
- Ron Rigler – engineering
- Matt Murman – engineering
- Peter Steinman – engineering
- Scott Skidmore – engineering
- John Golden – mastering

Visual art

- "Snap" – sculpture
- Mary Scanlan – photography
- Paul "Bosco" Haggard – photography

Studios

- Coast Records, San Francisco, California – recording
- Different Fur, San Francisco, California – mixing
- The Plant, Sausalito, California – mixing
- K-Disc, Los Angeles, California – mastering

== Charts ==
Chart performance for Miscellaneous Debris
Chart (1994)	Peak position
Australia (ARIA)	69
