= Electric Apricot: Quest for Festeroo (soundtrack) =

Soundtrack album
- Released: March 18, 2008
- Recorded: May 25, 2005
- Genre: Jam band
- Length: 75:49
- Label: Hip-O Records

Electric Apricot: Quest for Festeroo is the title of the soundtrack album to the National Lampoon mockumentary of the same name, written by Les Claypool. The album features five exclusive songs written and recorded by the movie's eponymous band, Electric Apricot, alongside tracks contributed by some well respected performers on the jam band scene. The Electric Apricot tracks were recorded on May 25, 2005 at Claypool's home studio, Rancho Relaxo, except for "Yog Sagoff", which was recorded live the same day at the Sweetwater Saloon.

== Track listing ==
1. "Hey Are You Going to Burning Man?" - Electric Apricot 7:48
2. "Backroads of My Mind" - Electric Apricot 4:15
3. "Uncle Pete's Party" - Electric Apricot 7:38
4. "Sugar Train Blues" - Electric Apricot 6:33
5. "Fishing Blues" - Henry Thomas 2:43
6. "Playing in the Band" - Bob Weir 7:38
7. "Time to Confess" - Gov't Mule 5:44
8. "Shady Grove" - Jerry Garcia and David Grisman 4:19
9. "Dire Wolf" - Stiff Dead Cat 3:13
10. "Everybody Ona Move" - Michael Franti and Spearhead 5:49
11. "Calling All Sand Worms" - Larry LaLonde 3:22
12. "Yog Sagoff" (live) - Electric Apricot 19:47

== Personnel ==
Songs credited to Electric Apricot were written and performed by the following musicians.

- Les Claypool (as Lapland "Lapdog" Miclovich) - drums, vocals
- Adam Gates (as Steve "Aiwass" Trouzdale) - bass guitar
- Bryan Kehoe (as Steven "Gordo" Gordon) - guitar, lead vocals
- Jonathan Korty (as Herschel Tambor Brillstien) - keyboards, vocals, others
