= Brown Album =

Studio album by Primus
- Released: July 8, 1997
- Recorded: December 1996 – April 1997
- Studios: Rancho Relaxo, Sebastopol, California
- Genres: Funk metal; progressive rock; jazz rock
- Length: 56:54
- Labels: Interscope; Prawn Song
- Producer: Primus

Primus chronology
| Tales from the Punchbowl (1995) | Brown Album (1997) | Rhinoplasty (1998) |

Singles from Brown Album
- 1. "Shake Hands with Beef" Released: 1997; 2. "Over the Falls" Released: 1997

Alternate cover
- Additional cover featuring the then current lineup of the band

Brown Album is the fifth studio album by American rock band Primus. It was released on July 8, 1997, by Prawn Song and Interscope Records. It was the band's first album with new drummer Brain, who replaced former drummer Tim Alexander. The album has received a mixed reception from critics and fans.

== Background ==
Brown Album was the first Primus release to not feature drummer Tim "Herb" Alexander and the first to feature Brain. Les Claypool stated "Herb's departure was like a marriage that just slowly decayed to an end ... When it came down to it, we came very close to dissolving entirely, to ending Primus. I went to Ler and said, 'Look, I'm not content anymore. We've got a good thing going between us and we should probably get a new drummer.' When we talked to Herb about it, he wasn't surprised at all--in fact he seemed very relieved. He's got his own thing now. He's writing and singing [with his new band, Laundry] and he's much happier." Regarding the name of the album, Claypool said "This is a milestone record for Primus so it needed to have a milestone title. The Beatles have their White Album, Metallica have their Black Album, now Primus have their Brown Album."

According to Brain, the album was called the Brown Album because of the way the band approached the recording session; the mixes were done in the most unconventional ways that sounded like a "muffled turd", hence the album title. According to Claypool, Tom Waits claimed it's his favourite Primus album because "It sounds like it needs a good wash".

== Musical style ==
Claypool stated "Song-wise I think Brown leans back to Suck... or [1990's] Frizzle Fry". "It's a far more aggressive album than we've done in a long time. The differences between this album and [Punch Bowl...] are far greater than the differences between this album and the very early stuff."

The band decided to record and produce the album completely analog at their "rancho relaxo" recording studio in California. This approach would be completely reversed on the much more accessible Antipop album in 1999.

== Touring ==
In 1997, Primus toured with Limp Bizkit and Powerman 5000; the two other bands had both released their major label debuts that year.

== Reception ==
Professional ratings
Review scores
| Source | Rating |
|---|---|
| AllMusic | 4/5 stars |
| The Daily Vault | A− |
| Entertainment Weekly | C |
| Kerrang! | 3/5 stars |
| Metal Hammer | 0/5 stars |
| Rolling Stone | 2/5 stars |

In his review for AllMusic, Stephen Thomas Erlewine contends that "the replacement of drummer Tim "Herb" Alexander with Brian [sic] "Brain" Mantia doesn't affect Primus' sound in any notable way", but also notes that the album "moves Primus even further into progressive and jazz-rock territory". In conclusion, he describes Brown Album as "standard Primus – all instrumental interplay and adolescent humor – but it's delivered with more finesse and skill than ever." For Entertainment Weekly, Wook Kim describes the band as "in decline" since their "satisfyingly eclectic" early albums, noting that with Brown Album they "cross that thin line between novel and novelty." The San Diego Union labeled the album as "flat-sounding".

Tom Moon, for Rolling Stone, describes Brown Album as "precisely the type of weirdness that Primus have been peddling for years – progressive-rock instrumentals camouflaged in the tattered rags of punk and the absurdist narratives of a junior Zappa", although he notes that the songs "all wind up sounding the same... Galumphing processionals more notable for their robotic persistence than for their musical invention." He calls the album "more accessible" in the way that it "moves away from Primus' pet herky-jerky shifts of meter long enough to establish serious, straightforward grooves", but also "more accomplished than inspired" with an "increasingly obvious soul deficit." In their September 1997 review, CMJ compared the album to Frank Zappa and the television series King of the Hill, and referred to it as being "bizarre", writing "If anyone was afraid that Primus was going to sell out, The Brown Album will quickly put those fears to rest."

=== Legacy and commercial performance ===
Oran O'Beirne of Yahoo! reflected on the album on its 25th anniversary in July 2022, describing it as showcasing "a unique form of psycho jazz, bass-oriented metal, and alt-rock psychedelia." The writer added, "in hindsight, the band themselves regarded it a difficult album to digest, but there is a lot of magic between its grooves, along with a tremendous amount of passion and courageous soul that assisted Claypool and co in becoming one of the most highly regarded bands in the alt.metal/rock history books."

Claypool claimed the album was "not as financially successful".

== Track listing ==
All lyrics are written by Les Claypool; all music is composed by Primus (Claypool, Larry LaLonde and Bryan “Brain” Mantia), except where noted.

| No. | Title | Music | Length |
|---|---|---|---|
| 1. | "The Return of Sathington Willoughby" | | 5:04 |
| 2. | "Fisticuffs" | | 4:25 |
| 3. | "Golden Boy" | | 3:05 |
| 4. | "Over the Falls" | Claypool | 2:41 |
| 5. | "Shake Hands with Beef" | | 4:02 |
| 6. | "Camelback Cinema" | | 4:00 |
| 7. | "Hats Off" | Claypool | 1:57 |
| 8. | "Puddin' Taine" | | 3:37 |
| 9. | "Bob's Party Time Lounge" | | 4:44 |
| 10. | "Duchess and the Proverbial Mind Spread" | | 3:30 |
| 11. | "Restin' Bones" | | 4:29 |
| 12. | "Coddingtown" | | 2:52 |
| 13. | "Kalamazoo" | | 3:31 |
| 14. | "The Chastising of Renegade" | | 5:03 |
| 15. | "Arnie" | | 3:54 |
| Total length: | | | 56:54 |

== Personnel ==
=== Primus ===
- Les Claypool – vocals, bass, upright bass
- Larry LaLonde – guitar
- Brain – drums

=== Production ===
- Produced by Primus
- Engineered by Les Claypool
- Production coordinator: Jill "Galaxy Queen" Rose
- Studio assistant: Tim "Soya" Solyan

== Charts ==
Chart performance for Brown Album
| Chart (1997) | Peak position |
|---|---|
| Australian Albums (ARIA) | 34 |
| Finnish Albums (Suomen virallinen lista) | 14 |
| German Albums (Offizielle Top 100) | 99 |
| US Billboard 200 | 21 |

== See also ==
- Kalamazoo, Michigan
