= Shake Hands with Beef =

Single by Primus

from the album Brown Album
- Released: 1997
- Length: 4:02
- Label: Interscope
- Songwriters: Les Claypool, Larry LaLonde, Bryan Mantia
- Producer: Primus

Primus singles chronology
"Southbound Pachyderm" (1995)	"Shake Hands with Beef" (1997)	"Over the Falls" (1997)

"Shake Hands with Beef" is a song by the American rock band Primus. It was released on their fifth album Brown Album (1997). The song was also released as the first single from the album.

The song's title and chorus refers to a vegetarian friend of singer Les Claypool who would occasionally eat meat and refer to the occasion as "shaking hands with beef"; Claypool has interpreted the phrase as a "metaphor for deviating from the norm".

== Music video ==
The video, directed by Les Claypool, features him, Larry LaLonde, and new drummer Bryan Mantia dressed in orange and brown playing atop a garbage can the size of insects, while a family grills up a dinner of hamburgers in front of their trailer home. At certain points, Claypool and LaLonde grow insect wings and buzz around the barbecue, only to get swatted at by the family members, with Claypool eventually flying into a bug zapper.

The video was recorded at a slower pace and sped up, making the band members appear to be making strange, jerky, insect-like motions reminiscent of flies.

== Other versions ==
The song was performed live for the first time with Bryan "Brain" Mantia on drums on Late Night with Conan O'Brien in 1997. An extended version of this song appears on Primus' "Best Of" album, They Can't All Be Zingers.

== Reception ==
AllMusic writer Stephen Thomas Erlewine chose "Shake Hands with Beef" as one of the 3 highlights on the album, writing that the song "has a reasonably amusing adolescent lyric, but the real attraction of the song is how its thunderous bass riff weaves in and out with the syncopated drums and avant guitar".
