= Tommy the Cat =

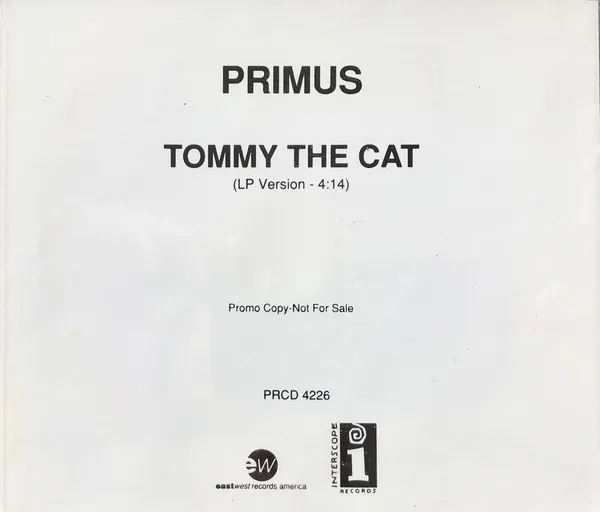

Promotional single by Primus

from the album Sailing the Seas of Cheese
- Released: 1991
- Recorded: January 1991
- Studio: Fantasy (Berkeley, California)
- Length: 4:15
- Label: Interscope
- Songwriters: Les Claypool; Todd Huth; Larry LaLonde; Tim Alexander
- Producer: Primus

Primus singles chronology
"Jerry Was a Race Car Driver" (1991)	"Tommy the Cat" (1991)	"Making Plans for Nigel" (1992)

Music video
- "Tommy the Cat" on YouTube

"Tommy the Cat" is a song by the American rock band Primus. It was released as a promotional single from their second studio album, Sailing the Seas of Cheese (1991).

== Recording ==
The song contains spoken word portions (as the voice of Tommy the Cat) interspersed with the singing of Les Claypool. In their live performances, such as the version on the live album Suck on This, Claypool does both parts himself; however, Tom Waits provided the voice of Tommy the Cat on the studio version from Sailing the Seas of Cheese.

== Release ==
Primus released "Tommy the Cat" following their first promotional single, "Jerry Was a Race Car Driver". In concert, Claypool started introducing all of their other songs by saying "This next song is not Tommy the Cat", apparently due to the popularity the song had gained after a video was released and played on MTV.

== Personnel ==
- Les Claypool - vocals, bass guitar
- Larry LaLonde - guitars
- Tim Alexander - drums, percussion
- Tom Waits - vocals

== Equipment ==
- The guitar used to record the guitar on the song by Larry Lalonde was an ESP 400 Series guitar borrowed from Kirk Hammet of Metallica. The same instrument can be found in the music video for the Metallica song "One". The guitar used in the video is a Fender Stratocaster in tobacco burst, equipped with a Seymour Duncan Hot Rails, equipped in the bridge position. This is the same guitar featured in the John The Fisherman Music Video.

== Music video ==
A black-and-white music video was made featuring live action and animation. Les Claypool is seen as a bartender pouring milk for an elderly man (played by Claypool's grandfather) dressed as a cat and a smiling figure. The animation featured a female cat strolling into an alley filled with numerous tomcats while the titular Tommy relays what happened. Interspersed are occasional footage of the band playing the song.
