= Antipop =

Studio album by Primus
- Released: October 19, 1999
- Recorded: 1999
- Studios: Rancho Relaxo (Sebastopol, California); The Village Recorder (Los Angeles, California); Fantasy Studios (Berkeley, California)
- Genres: Nu metal; alternative metal; funk metal; funk rock; experimental rock
- Length: 58:58
- Labels: Interscope; Prawn Song
- Producers: Primus; Tom Morello; Stewart Copeland; Tom Waits; Matt Stone; Fred Durst

Primus chronology
Rhinoplasty (1998)	Antipop (1999)	Animals Should Not Try to Act Like People (2003)

Singles from Antipop
- 1. "Lacquer Head" Released: 1999; 2. "Electric Uncle Sam" Released: 1999

Antipop is the sixth studio album by American rock band Primus. It was released on October 19, 1999, through Prawn Song Records and Interscope Records. Produced by the band, Tom Morello, Stewart Copeland, Tom Waits, Matt Stone, and Fred Durst, it was the final release by the band before their hiatus from 2000 to 2003. It was also their last album with drummer Brain. The album received mostly positive reviews from critics.

== Musical style ==
Musically, Antipop has been described as nu metal, alternative metal, funk metal, funk rock, and experimental rock.

== Production ==
The album features several well-known guest musicians and producers, including Tom Waits, James Hetfield (of Metallica), Jim Martin (former member of Faith No More), Fred Durst (of Limp Bizkit) and Tom Morello (of Rage Against the Machine).

The band has regarded the album's production as tense and uncomfortable, with the members of the band not getting along well with each other during recording. Claypool has stated "Antipop was the most difficult record we ever made, because there was a lot of tension between the three of us, and there was some doubt at the label as to whether we knew what the hell we were doing anymore. But there was some great things to come out of it, like the tune we did with Tom Waits, 'Coattails of a Dead Man'. I love that song." In the song, a woman's husband suffers from substance abuse; when the husband tries to find comfort from his wife, he commits suicide when receiving none. Instead of grieving, his wife finds fame and fortune from his death. It is said that the song is about Courtney Love, although none of the members from Primus have confirmed nor denied this.

After the release of the album the band went on a three-year hiatus from 2000 to 2003. Claypool said "We went on a hiatus, which is a fancy way of saying we just didn’t like being around each other and we wanted to break up but we didn’t have the balls to actually break up. I think we stopped before we totally shit our pants, but I think the closest we came was doing the Antipop record,"

While producing the song "Lacquer Head", Durst encouraged Primus to return to the more aggressive metal sound of their earlier albums Sailing the Seas of Cheese and Frizzle Fry for Antipop.

== Reception ==
Professional ratings
Review scores
Source	Rating
AllMusic	4/5 stars

The album received mostly positive reviews from critics. Stephen Thomas Erlewine of Allmusic gave the album a positive review, describing the album as "one of Primus' most ambitious and best efforts", noting that "some collaborations are among the best things Primus has ever recorded". Towards the end of the piece, Erlewine sums up his views by admitting that "they're not always successful, but no two songs sound the same [...] and even if it's not to your particular taste, it's hard not to respect this." A more negative review came Mike Wolf of CMJ New Music Monthly in November 1999. He wrote, "in the last couple of years since their last proper release, The Brown Album, the Bay-Area trio has had to watch as a bunch of other bands tagged as 'funk metal' dully thudded their way to superstardom. But bands like Korn and Limp Bizkit lack everything that sets Primus apart; an eccentric sense of humor, and the musical skill to bring weirdness to life. A pity then that on Antipop, Primus merely embraces the knucklehead approach of the Family Values crowd."

=== Legacy ===
The band themselves were not pleased with how the album turned out; their dissatisfaction with the record was a contributing factor for the band's brief dissolution. Les Claypool said "We were reaching the end of our creative rope. The well was just dry, so we just started sucking mud". In a 2015 interview, Claypool additionally characterized the album as "somewhat directionless", adding that "for the most part, it’s my least favorite Primus record". Regarding their association with the nu metal scene around this time, Claypool reflected in 2022, "a lot of these bands ended up touring with us. I always joke that we were the leapfrog band because you open for Primus and you become huge. I remember Interscope really wanting us to do Family Values and Ozzfest. And I was just not super comfortable in those worlds. I mean, we did them, and we made a lot of great friends from them, but it just didn’t feel like we fit."

For the first time in 20 years, the band performed "The Antipop", "Eclectic Electric" and a portion of "Lacquer Head" as a part of their pay-per-view special, "Alive from Pachyderm Station".

== Track listing ==
All lyrics are written by Les Claypool; all music is composed by Primus (Claypool, Larry LaLonde and Bryan “Brain” Mantia), except where noted.

No.	Title	Music	Producer(s)	Length
1.	"Intro"		Primus	0:17
2.	"Electric Uncle Sam"	Claypool, LaLonde, Mantia, Tom Morello	Morello & Primus	2:55
3.	"Natural Joe"		Matt Stone & Primus	4:12
4.	"Lacquer Head"		Fred Durst & Primus	3:49
5.	"The Antipop"		Primus	5:33
6.	"Eclectic Electric"		Primus	8:34
7.	"Greet the Sacred Cow"		Primus	5:10
8.	"Mama Didn't Raise No Fool"	Claypool, LaLonde, Mantia, Morello	Tom Morello & Primus	5:04
9.	"Dirty Drowning Man"		Stewart Copeland	4:48
10.	"Ballad of Bodacious"		Primus	3:28
11.	"Power Mad"	Claypool, LaLonde, Mantia, Morello	Tom Morello & Primus	3:42
12.	"The Final Voyage of the Liquid Sky"		Primus	5:39
13.	"Coattails of a Dead Man" (This track ends at 5:17. After a minute of silence a studio version of "The Heckler" from ‘’Suck on This’’ plays.)		Tom Waits	9:57
Total length:				63:15

No.	Title	Music	Producer(s)	Length
13.	"Coattails of a Dead Man"		Tom Waits	5:18
14.	"The Heckler"	Claypool, LaLonde, Tim Alexander	Primus	3:41
Total length:				62:04

- "Lacquer Head" is misspelled as "Laquer Head" on the back cover track listing.
- Around 38 seconds into the title track, the phrase "They're Here", from Poltergeist, can be heard right before the music starts playing.
- On some digital versions of the album, “Coattails of a Deadman” and “The Heckler” are separated into two tracks.

== Personnel ==
Primus

- Les Claypool – vocals, bass; production (except 9 & 13); mixing (2)
- Larry LaLonde – guitar; synthesizer (6); production (except 9 & 13)
- Brain – drums, percussion; production (except 9 & 13)

Guest musicians

- James Hetfield – guitar (6)
- Jim Martin – guitar (6)
- Martina Topley-Bird – backing vocals (9 and 13)

Technical personnel

- Tom Morello – production, guitar, “House Panties” (2, 8 and 11)
- Tom Waits – production, vocals, Chamberlin (13)
- Matt Stone – production (3)
- Fred Durst – production (4)
- Stewart Copeland – production (9)
- Toby Wright – mixing (except 2)
- Oz Fritz – recording and engineering; mixing (2); ambient recordings (5 & 7)
- Derek Featherstone – mixing (2)
- Leff Lefferts – mixing assstance (except 2)
- Stephen Marcussen – mastering
- Stewart Whitmore – digital editing
- Craig Howell – art & illustration
- Rueben Raffael – art direction
- Dave Hunter – layout

== Charts ==
Chart performance for Antipop
Chart (1999)	Peak position
Australian Albums (ARIA)	33
Finnish Albums (Suomen virallinen lista)	39
US Billboard 200	44
