= Jerry Was a Race Car Driver =

Promotional single by Primus

from the album Sailing the Seas of Cheese
- Released: 1991
- Recorded: January 1991
- Studio: Fantasy (Berkeley, California)
- Genre: Funk metal
- Length: 3:11
- Label: Interscope
- Songwriters: Les Claypool; Larry LaLonde; Tim Alexander
- Producer: Primus

Primus singles chronology
"Jerry Was a Race Car Driver" (1991)	"Tommy the Cat" (1991)

Music video
- "Jerry Was a Race Car Driver" on YouTube

"Jerry Was a Race Car Driver" is a song by American rock band Primus. It was released as a promotional single from their second studio album, Sailing the Seas of Cheese (1991), and peaked at No. 23 on Billboard's Modern Rock Tracks chart. The song tells the stories of two characters, Jerry, an ill-fated race car driver who collides with a telephone pole while driving intoxicated (hence the use of "was" in the title) and Captain Pearce, a retired fireman.

== History ==
"Jerry Was a Race Car Driver" was the first Primus song to be released as a single. It was released as a promotional single in 1991.

The song received heavy airplay on rock radio, and peaked at No. 23 on Billboard's Modern Rock Tracks chart in 1991. It features a sample of Bill Moseley's character Chop Top from the film The Texas Chainsaw Massacre 2, chuckling to himself then remarking: "Dog will hunt!"

== Music video ==
The music video begins with Bob Cock getting an order of nachos at an arcade, only to drop them after a collision with Larry LaLonde on a skateboard once outside. The rest of the video cuts between scenes of the band playing an out-of-control gig at the Phoenix Theater in Petaluma, California, close-up shots of the fallen nachos, and racecar footage. Some of the early racecar footage was filmed at the Petaluma Speedway, a few blocks away from the Phoenix Theater. At the end, the camera zooms in on the cheese, and there is a claymation segment which features many of the creatures on the cover of Sailing the Seas of Cheese, then zooms back out to the cheese, where a pit bull sniffs and eats it to close the video. The band would return to claymation for the "My Name Is Mud" and "Southbound Pachyderm" videos years later.

In the video, Les Claypool's Rainbow Bass can be seen without its upper horn – this was how the bass was originally built, but the design was not balanced well, which caused Les to send it back to Carl Thompson to get it rebuilt entirely with its signature scroll horn added; the video was filmed before the bass was remade. It became an MTV favorite at the time.

== Reception ==
AllMusic writer Steve Huey thought that the song "established Primus as a freewheelingly unorthodox hard rock band with a memorable, utterly distinctive sound". He picked it as one of the highlights on the album.

== Track listing ==
1. "Jerry Was a Race Car Driver" – 3:11

== Charts ==
Chart (1991)	Peak position
US Alternative Airplay (Billboard)	23
