= Too Many Puppies =

Song by Primus

from the album Frizzle Fry
- Released: February 7, 1990
- Recorded: December 1989
- Studio: Different Fur (San Francisco, California)
- Genre: Alternative metal
- Length: 3:57
- Label: Caroline
- Songwriters: Les Claypool; Larry LaLonde; Tim Alexander
- Producers: Primus; Matt Winegar

"Too Many Puppies" is a song by the American rock band Primus. It was the first Primus song bassist and lead singer Les Claypool ever composed. A reworked version featuring drummer Bryan "Brain" Mantia can be found on their second EP, Rhinoplasty (1998).

== Music video ==
The music video for "Too Many Puppies" had been a rarity until 2003, when it was released on Animals Should Not Try to Act Like People. The video features a man who, after shaving his head, acts weird with army material (such as an army helmet, a pair of boots, and a rifle) and a woman in makeup (presumably his mother) and milk, all in accordance with the song's lyrics; interspersed are shots of the band playing live in front of a rowdy crowd.

== Live performances ==
Primus first played the song in 1987, and it has been regularly played in their live shows ever since. Occasionally, when playing the song live, Les Claypool plays teases of various cover songs, such as the opening riff of Metallica's "Master of Puppets", as a bridge before the final verse.

== Reception ==
Reviewing Frizzle Fry for AllMusic, Ned Raggett described the song as a "grinding march/stomp", also noting its "wry and worried vision of an overcrowded future".

In 2015, AXS ranked "Too Many Puppies" the third best Primus song.
