= Those Damned Blue-Collar Tweekers =

Song by Primus

from the album Sailing the Seas of Cheese
- Released: May 14, 1991
- Recorded: January 1991
- Studio: Fantasy (Berkeley, California)
- Genre: Alternative metal; funk metal
- Length: 5:20
- Label: Interscope
- Songwriters: Les Claypool; Larry LaLonde; Tim Alexander
- Producer: Primus

"Those Damned Blue-Collar Tweekers" is a song by the American rock band Primus. The song opens with Larry LaLonde on guitar and a reserved bassline from Les Claypool, from there alternating between his trademark slap bass and a quiet section for the vocals.

The song's narrative describes several different trades that the town's blue collar tweekers engage in, but, like many of the other story-telling songs in Primus' catalogue, lacks any clear, single meaning and leaves plenty of ambiguity in its lyrics. The song is about truck drivers and "blue-collar workers" using methamphetamine.

I was born in a suburb by the East Bay, a rural, almost redneck environment. I grew up on the blue-collar side of town. My father was a mechanic, both my uncles are mechanics, my grandfather was a mechanic. That song is not derogatory at all. It’s very much me. A tweaker is someone who is strung out on methyl amphetamines, otherwise known as crank. There’s a reference in there to a guy who hung Sheetrock, and that’s how he got through the day. He’d snort up speed to keep up with the younger guys.

— Les Claypool

== Live performances ==
The band's Woodstock 1994 performance of the song was particularly notable, with Claypool beginning a bass rendition of the Star Spangled Banner in homage to Jimi Hendrix's guitar performance of the national anthem decades before, but eventually apologizing to the crowd by saying "Sorry, I had to do it" and returning to the song.

A live version of the song (performed at Primus' show at the Brixton Academy, London, England on July 13, 2011) also appears as an iTunes exclusive bonus track on the band's seventh studio album, Green Naugahyde (2011).
