= Larry LaLonde =

American guitarist

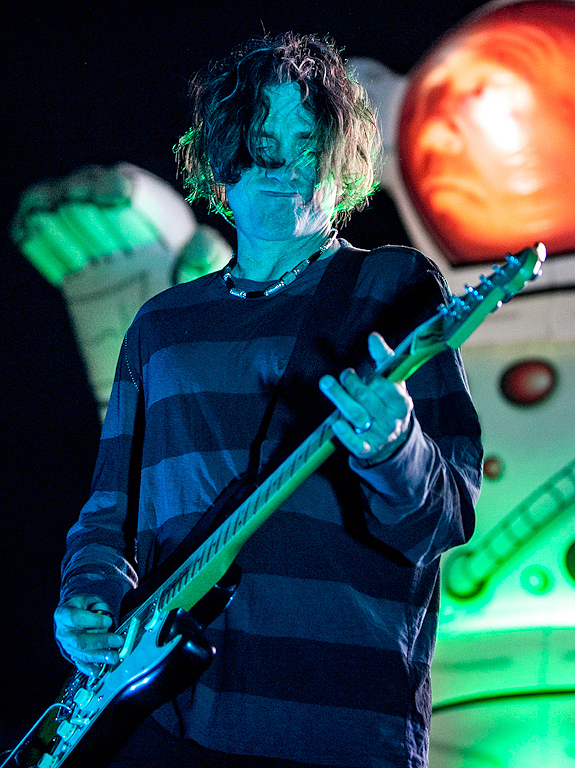
- LaLonde performing with Primus in 2012

Background information
- Also known as: Ler
- Born: Reid Laurence LaLonde; September 12, 1968 (age 58); Oakland, California, U.S.
- Genres: Alternative metal; funk metal; funk rock; progressive rock; thrash metal; death metal (early)
- Occupation: Guitarist
- Years active: 1984–present
- Member of: Primus
- Formerly of: Possessed; Blind Illusion

Reid Laurence LaLonde (born September 12, 1968), also known as Ler LaLonde, is an American musician. He has been the guitarist for the rock band Primus since 1989, where he is known for his experimental accompaniment to the bass playing of bandmate Les Claypool. Previously, he played guitar for several groups including Possessed and Blind Illusion. He also has collaborated more recently with artists such as Serj Tankian and Tom Waits.

== Biography ==
=== Early career ===
LaLonde was born in Oakland, California. Originally inspired by guitarists such as Frank Zappa, Snakefinger, East Bay Ray, Jerry Garcia, Jimi Hendrix, and his teacher Joe Satriani, LaLonde eventually became interested in early thrash metal bands such as Metallica, Slayer and Exodus; his other influences or inspirations were Van Halen, Black Sabbath, AC/DC, Iron Maiden, Rush, Venom, Yngwie Malmsteen and Uli Jon Roth-era Scorpions. LaLonde formed his first band in high school, a speed metal band called Blizzard. He left the band later on to join the first generation death metal band Possessed. Possessed's landmark first album, Seven Churches, was released in 1985 when LaLonde was just 17 years old. According to LaLonde, he earned the nickname "Ler" at a young age because his friends were too lazy to say his middle name in its entirety.

After Seven Churches, Possessed released the Beyond the Gates album and The Eyes of Horror EP before breaking up in 1987. LaLonde then joined experimental thrash metal band Blind Illusion, appearing on the 1988 album The Sane Asylum, through which he became friends with bassist Les Claypool. At around the same time, he was also a member of Corrupted Morals, with whom he recorded the album Cheese-It, released the following year. At the start of 1989, LaLonde left Blind Illusion and Corrupted Morals when Claypool invited him to reform the funk metal outfit Primus, which had been on hiatus since original guitarist Todd Huth left the previous year.

=== Primus ===
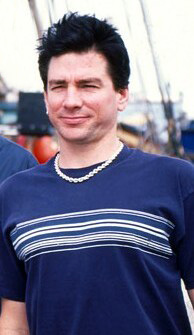
LaLonde in 1998

With LaLonde on board, together with drummer Tim Alexander, Primus released their first album, the live Suck on This, in 1989, followed by the studio album Frizzle Fry in 1990. In 1991, came their major label debut Sailing the Seas of Cheese. The band's next studio album, Pork Soda, arrived in 1993 and landed in the Billboard Top 10. Tales from the Punchbowl followed in 1995, featuring one of Primus's most well-known songs, the single "Wynona's Big Brown Beaver," which was nominated for the 1996 Grammy for "Best Hard Rock Performance." Alexander left Primus in 1996 to be replaced by Bryan Mantia, and the group released two more albums, Brown Album in 1997 and Antipop in 1999, before going on hiatus in 2000.

In 2002, Primus returned from their hiatus with Claypool and LaLonde reuniting with Alexander, releasing the DVD/EP Animals Should Not Try to Act Like People in 2003 and the Hallucino-Genetics live DVD in 2004. On October 17, 2006, Primus released both their first greatest hits CD They Can't All Be Zingers and their third DVD Blame It on the Fish: An Abstract Look at the 2003 Primus Tour de Fromage.

In 2010, early Primus drummer Jay Lane rejoined the group, and they released the free June 2010 Rehearsal digital EP. A new album, titled Green Naugahyde, was released on September 13, 2011.

In 2014, Tim Alexander rejoined the group and they released their 8th studio album "Primus & the Chocolate Factory with the Fungi Ensemble", a re-imagining of the soundtrack for the 1971 film "Willy Wonka & the Chocolate Factory". In 2017, Primus released their 9th studio album "The Desaturating Seven", which would then be followed by an EP in 2022 titled "Conspiranoid".

=== Other projects ===
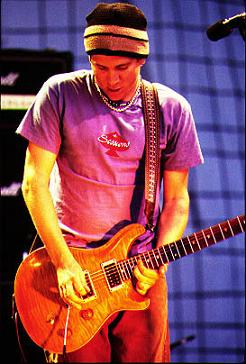
LaLonde in 2008

Interviewed by Zorak, LaLonde guest-starred in the live-action/animated talk show Space Ghost Coast to Coast on Cartoon Network.

During the Primus hiatus, LaLonde formed the experimental alternative band No Forcefield with Bryan Mantia, releasing two albums between 2000 and 2002.

In 2007 and 2008, LaLonde toured with Serj Tankian and the F.C.C. in support of the album Elect the Dead. Two live tracks featuring LaLonde were later released on the digital EP Lie Lie Live. Throughout 2011, he recorded several tracks for the 2012 game Twisted Metal.

In 2024 LaLonde recorded with John Heintz's funk-rock supergroup The Big Ol' Nasty Getdown. Ler appears on 'Ten Hits' on the band's 'RepurposE Purpose - Volume 1' album.

== Playing style ==
Known for his technical proficiency as a guitar player, LaLonde uses many advanced guitar techniques such as pinch harmonics, sweep picking, pick tapping, volume swells and tapping, as well as other extended techniques in his music. His early work with Primus was influenced by his roots in heavy metal, but by the time of Pork Soda (1993), LaLonde's guitar playing had evolved to a more unusual style and was earning comparisons to experimental jazz guitarists like Sonny Sharrock and Marc Ribot. His influences include funk, world music, heavy metal and film music. Melodically his playing makes heavy use of tritone intervals, the whole tone scale and the diminished scale, helping establish Primus’ hard, dissonant, dark sound.

== Personal life ==
In addition to being Primus' guitarist, LaLonde is also an avid skateboarder; he plays the skater who knocks the nachos out of Bob Cock's hand in the video for "Jerry Was a Race Car Driver".

As of 2016, LaLonde lives in Los Angeles with his wife Shane Stirling, a model from the CBS show The Price Is Right, and their two children Sierra and Avery. In January 2025, their home was destroyed in the Palisades Fire.

== Equipment ==
=== Possessed ===
LaLonde's first guitar was a Hondo II, acquired after witnessing his first concert (Moving Pictures Tour). Later he would use a half green, half white Gibson Flying V style guitar, playing in Blizzard with Jeff Becerra. In his time in Possessed we see him using a black with white pickguard Gibson Flying V and Gibson Explorer in the early days of the band. For the majority of his time in Possessed he used a black Charvel Star. Towards the end of Possessed he transitioned to using a fully black Squier Stratocaster, most likely a Japanese model given the experimental locking bridge. None of these guitars are seen again except for a YouTube short showing Ler briefly reunited with the Gibson Explorer backstage. These guitars are all likely still around somewhere in Northern California as it does not seem like he was in possession of any at the time of the tragic gear fire. He Used Marshall Amps and Cabinets at the time.

=== Blind Illusion, Corrupted Morals and early Primus ===
This is the beginning of the journey for one of LaLonde's most prominent guitars. After the end of Possessed, He acquired a white 1979 Fender Stratocaster. The guitar was stock with 3 single coil pickups and a non-floating tremolo, however heavily inspired by players such as Eddie Van Halen, he modified it to fit a humbucker in the bridge position and a replacement Floyd Rose bridge using a steak knife. This would become his main guitar until receiving an arsenal of PRS Guitars during the recording of Pork Soda in which he burned off the finish of the guitar giving it a burnt natural look. This guitar would be featured in the "Too Many Puppies" music video and used as a main guitar up to 1993. Sadly this guitar was destroyed along with his house and about 60 other guitars and his home in early 2025. This guitar was used on the recording of Frizzle Fry and Sailing the Seas of Cheese. Furthermore, LaLonde can be seen using a Charvel Superstrat style guitar with a reverse body and a metallic red finish (likely a custom build) in Blind Illusion live shows. This guitar shows up again at the Primus KZSU radio recording but never again after that, either sold to fund the next backup guitar or retired after heavy Blind Illusion touring. After this guitar, Ler acquired another Fender Stratocaster in a Tobacco Burst finish to be used as a backup guitar. He added a Seymour Duncan Hotrail pickup in the bridge position. This guitar was the main guitar for the Bob Cock and the Yellow Sock performances and is featured in the music videos for "John the Fisherman" and "Tommy the Cat". This guitar was in use until being replaced by some Ibanez guitars in 1991. This guitar was sold in the 2010s to a fan. Inspired by Les' custom basses, Ler worked with Ibanez to create three custom RG style guitars equipped with an HSS pickup system and locking bridge. These guitars would feature a natural wood body with no finish (like the basses), one light, one dark and the other unknown. The unknown one was stolen at a photoshoot, the dark one was sold to a friend and the light one is somewhere at Rancho Relaxo, the studio of friend and bandmate Les Claypool. The dark one was used in the "Jerry Was a Race Car Driver" music video and was the main backup touring guitar to go along with the 79' Strat and the light one. After trying the PRS Guitars of Alex Lifeson on the Roll The Bones Tour, Ler received a new main guitar, a quilted green PRS Custom 24 with a P90 in the neck and standard humbucker in the bridge along with a stable non-locking tremolo as an improvement to the Floyd Rose. This would become his main guitar for the rest of 1992 (79' Strat as backup) and the recording of Pork Soda and Miscellaneous Debris. The guitar would not show up after this and was likely lost in the fire. He was still using Marshall amps at this time along with a Yamaha SPX90 multi effects rack, Notably used to create the intro sound from "Those Damned Blue-Collar Tweekers".

=== Pork Soda ===
During the recording of Pork Soda, Ler would receive a trio of PRS guitars. To get the least prominent out of the way first, The PRS Guitars McCarty in an amber sunburst. This guitar was his only (publicly known) McCarty guitar, sticking to the more versatile Custom 24 for his others. This guitar was featured in PRS Guitars magazine advertisements featuring Ler holding the guitar on the diving board at Rancho Relaxo. Next, the backup guitar, this was a Custom 24 in a natural walnut finish, used as a backup in 1993-1994, also seen again in 1998's Videoplasty so it was likely on tour through that whole period, just losing priority backing favour after 1994. These guitars again are most likely fire victims. It was here when Ler received his most iconic guitar, the flamed maple, vintage yellow (despite looking more orange) Custom 24. This became his main guitar from 1993 up until 2000 when the band disbanded for the first time. It would then reappear in the 2003/2004 tours. Then it would not make an appearance until the late 2010's when Ler needed a guitar with 24 frets on the road with him. It has stayed in consistent use, still on the road at the time of writing (2026). A lucky case of not arriving home yet after a tour, avoiding the fire, keeping this iconic 'piece of furniture' still alive and shredding. This guitar may have been used on Pork Soda but was definitely the main recording guitar on Tales from the Punchbowl, Brown Album and Antipop and appears in the music videos for: "DMV", "My Name Is Mud", "Shake Hands With Beef" and "Lacquer Head". To record "The Air Is Getting Slippery" for Pork Soda and future banjo tracks, Ler acquired a Deering Banjo Company 6-string banjo, used live and on future banjo recordings. Another weird guitar from the Pork Soda era is the Carvin V220 used in the "Mr Krinkle" music video. Both likely fire victims. In terms of amps and effects, Ler used two Boss Digital Delays and a Big Muff into an ADA MP-1 pre-amp and a Yamaha SPX-900. This would go into two Marshall Amps JCM-900's. His long list of effects: Octave Multiplexer, ADA Stereo Tapped Delay, Mu-Tron Bi-phase, Mu-Tron Phaser, Mu-Tron Envelope, Morley Rotating Wah, Boss Dynamic Filter, Systech Phase Shifter, Ludwig Phase II Synthesizer, Maestro Phase Shifter, Maestro Rhythmn 'N Sound for Guitar and a Dunlop Cry-Baby wah.

=== Tales from the Punchbowl ===
Following the trend from the start of punchbowl, he received three new PRS Guitars. The two that would be reserved for studio and marketing would be a charcoal quilted Custom 24 and a violet Quilted 24. The charcoal would be used in guitar magazines and the violet would be used in the Southbound Pachyderm music video. The most prominent PRS from this time would be a solid black custom 24. This guitar was also used in guitar magazines and used on tour from 1995 to 2000, appearing up in the Primus Internet Infiltration. It then shows up again in 2008 and is another likely fire victim along with the other two. These guitars were all likely used for recording Tales from the Punchbowl. To match the big cartoon western style of the "Wynona's Big Brown Beaver" music video, he bought a 7-string Gretsch Van Epps. This guitar was sold to a private collection not long after the video premiered. The Amp and pedal setup is basically the same as punchbowl and continues like this until 2000, however his album did see the introduction of: two Marshall Amps 50 watt half stacks, Electro Harmonix Hot Tubes and a Boss Metal Zone. Also it is said that some new 1979 Fender Stratocasters were introduced at this time, however this is only confirmed by the time of the next album. The vintage yellow custom 24 was the main recording and live guitar of this period.

=== Brown Album ===
Strangely we do not see the usual three PRS delivery for this album, despite continuing on the one after so these guitars likely exist and where just never shown anywhere. However, we do know of four Fender Stratocaster used around this time, one with a natural wood appearance used on the recording of the Brown Album. For the "Over the Falls" video Ler used a Kay Archtop, using a Gibson ES-125T and ES-355 for live performances of the song. The amp and pedal situation is the same as the previous albums. The vintage yellow custom 24 was the main recording and live guitar of this period.

=== Antipop ===
Here we see the return of the three PRS tradition with a Vintage Sunburst flamed maple custom 24 being the new main backup around this time. This guitar was most likely used on Antipop and was used live until 2008. Around the mid to late 2000s when Primus would only play a few shows a year, this actually became his main guitar. The other two are custom 24's in Jasper Smokeburst flamed maple and Elephant Grey quilted maple. The elephant grey received some use during 1999-2000 shows and the Jasper Smokeburst would return for the 2003/2004 touring. The black custom 24 was most likely used on the album along with the main vintage yellow which was he main recording and live guitar of this period.

=== 2003/2004 ===
For this return of Primus, Ler used 4 new PRS custom 24 guitars however being inactive for a few years before this means some could be from the Brown Album era. These custom 24's are Vintage Yellow Flamed Maple (a new one), an unknown colour sunburst flamed maple, a solid white and a transparent red. These tours would also see the return of the old main vintage yellow and the antipop Vintage Sunburst. These would also be used in the few shows up to 2010. These tours would also see the use of a green HSS Fender Stratocaster and a new natural one. These along with the natural one from earlier and a green one we will get to shortly could likely be the four introduced at the time of Tales from the Punchbowl. We also see the introduction of two new Gibson's, a white SG and a Zappa inspired Burst which would stay in use until the fire where it was most likely destroyed. Ler started using Mesa Boogie Amps during this period along with the return of the Deering Banjo.

== Discography ==
=== Possessed ===
- 1985: Seven Churches
- 1986: Beyond the Gates
- 1987: The Eyes of Horror

=== Blind Illusion ===
- 1988: The Sane Asylum

=== Corrupted Morals ===
- 1989: Cheese-It

=== Primus ===
- 1989: Suck on This (live)
- 1990: Frizzle Fry
- 1991: Sailing the Seas of Cheese
- 1992: Miscellaneous Debris (EP)
- 1992: Cheesy Home Video (VHS)
- 1993: Pork Soda
- 1995: Tales from the Punchbowl
- 1997: Brown Album
- 1998: Rhinoplasty (EP)
- 1998: Videoplasty (VHS)
- 1999: Antipop
- 2003: Animals Should Not Try to Act Like People (DVD/EP)
- 2004: Hallucino-Genetics: Live 2004 (DVD)
- 2006: They Can't All Be Zingers (compilation)
- 2006: Blame It on the Fish: An Abstract Look at the 2003 Primus Tour de Fromage (DVD)
- 2010: June 2010 Rehearsal (EP)
- 2011: Green Naugahyde
- 2014: Primus & the Chocolate Factory with the Fungi Ensemble
- 2017: The Desaturating Seven
- 2022: Conspiranoid (EP)
- 2024: Sessanta E.P.P.P.
- 2025: Little Lord Fentanyl (EP)
- 2026: A Handful of Nuggs (EP)

=== with Tom Waits ===
- 1999: Mule Variations
- 1999: Jack Kerouac Reads On the Road
- 1999: Hold On
- 2006: Orphans: Brawlers, Bawlers & Bastards

=== No Forcefield ===
- 2000: Lee's Oriental Message
- 2001: God is an Excuse

=== with Serj Tankian ===
- 2008: Lie Lie Live (EP)
- 2024: Foundations (EP)

=== with The Big Ol' Nasty Getdown ===
- 2024: RepurposE Purpose - Volume 1

=== with The Spent Poets ===
- 1992: The Spent Poets

=== Beanpole ===
- 2018: All My Kin

=== with Phish ===
- 2007: Vegas 96

=== with Fishbone ===
- 2002: The Friendliest Psychosis Of All

=== Game, Film And Television Scores ===
- 1997: South Park
- 2006: Electric Apricot: Quest for Festeroo (soundtrack)
- 2011: The Horror Of Barnes Folly
- 2012: Twisted Metal (2012 video game)
- 2017: Get Big (film)

=== Unofficial Primus Releases ===
- 1992: Spagetti Western
- 1994: Back In The Madhouse
- 1994: You Can't Party Without Me!

=== Compilations ===
- 1984: Live In San Francisco 1984 (Possessed)
- 1985: Metal Massacre VI (Possessed)
- 1985: The Wild Bunch (18 Metal Masters) (Possessed)
- 1986: Live In San Francisco '84 & San Diego '86 (Possessed)
- 1989: Fallen Angels (Possessed)
- 1994: Tales From The Underground (Tom Waits)
- 1995: Tales From The Punchbowl + Miscellaneous Debris (Primus)
- 1996: Eyesore (A Stab At The Residents) (Primus)
- 1999: The Family Values Tour 1999 (Primus)
- 2000: Nativity In Black II: A Tribute To Black Sabbath (Primus)
- 2004: Burning Alive In Hell (Possessed)
- 2005: Agony In Paradise (Possessed)
- 2006: Ashes From Hell (Possessed)
- 2006: The Demos 1984-1992 (Possessed)
- 2011: Relix 2011 April/May CD Sampler (Primus)
- 2012: Vinyl Collection (Possessed
- 2022: The Revenant Juke: A Collection Of Fables And Farce (Primus)

=== Other ===
- 2022: South Park The 25th Anniversary Concert
