= Frizzle Fry =

Studio album by Primus
- Released: February 7, 1990
- Recorded: December 1989
- Studios: Different Fur, San Francisco
- Genres: Funk metal; alternative metal
- Length: 51:23
- Label: Caroline
- Producers: Primus, Matt Winegar

Primus chronology
| Suck on This (1989) | Frizzle Fry (1990) | Sailing the Seas of Cheese (1991) |

Frizzle Fry is the debut studio album by American rock band Primus. It was released on February 7, 1990, by Caroline Records. Produced by the band and Matt Winegar, the album was recorded at Different Fur Studios in San Francisco in December 1989. In 2015, Primus frontman Les Claypool ranked Frizzle Fry as his favorite Primus album.

== Background ==
Primus self-financed the recording of Frizzle Fry using proceeds from their preceding album, Suck On This. The completed album was then released in 1990 on Caroline Records. Frizzle Fry features guitarist Larry LaLonde playing many parts written by previous guitarist Todd Huth who left before the recording of the album.

Frizzle Fry features the band's first single and minor radio hit "John the Fisherman". It was remastered in 2002, after the original had been out of print for years; the album was released on Prawn Song Records. The remaster includes an extra track, named "Hello Skinny/Constantinople", a cover of the tracks "Hello Skinny" and "Constantinople" by the Residents.

"Too Many Puppies" is the first Primus song Les Claypool ever wrote. "You Can't Kill Michael Malloy" is an excerpt from the Spent Poets song of the same name. The album's producer, Matt Winegar, who also recorded and produced Suck on This, was a member of the group, and a clip is featured just before "The Toys Go Winding Down". The beginning of "To Defy the Laws of Tradition" is an excerpt from the instrumental "YYZ" by the Canadian rock band Rush from their 1981 album Moving Pictures, sampled from the live version of "John the Fisherman" which appears on Suck on This. Another Suck on This sample also appears at the end of "Groundhog's Day"; the "Hey hey, Bob Cock here!" spoken intro from that album's version.

== Live performance ==
Primus supported Frizzle Fry by opening for Jane's Addiction on a North American tour.

The album was performed live in its entirety on the band's Hallucino-Genetics Tour in 2004 and a few more times in 2010. During the Hallucino-Genetics Tour, "You Can't Kill Michael Malloy" was featured in its entirety as a short set break, as opposed to merely the excerpt that appears on the album.

== Critical reception ==
Professional ratings
Review scores
| Source | Rating |
|---|---|
| AllMusic | 3.5/5 stars |
| Chicago Tribune | 3/4 stars |
| Christgau's Consumer Guide | (1-star Honorable Mention) |
| The Encyclopedia of Popular Music | 3/5 stars |
| Metal Reviews | 86/100 |
| The Rolling Stone Album Guide | 3/5 stars |
| Spin Alternative Record Guide | 8/10 |
| Tiny Mix Tapes | 4.5/5 |

Robert Christgau described the album as "Don Knotts Jr. joins the Minutemen." The Washington Post wrote that "echoes of San Francisco's late and (in some quarters) lamented Dead Kennedys can be heard in this S.F. trio's cartoonish vocals and blasts at adult hypocrisy ('To Defy the Laws of Tradition') and mindless conformity ('Too Many Puppies'), but the sound is jazzy speed-metal, not punk." The Times said that "Primus exhibits the delinquent musical tendencies of early Frank Zappa updated to sit comfortably in the modern milieu of bands such as Anthrax and Faith No More".

Trouser Press stated that Frizzle Fry "effectively showcases drummer Tim 'Herb' Alexander's tight, frenetic technique and guitarist Larry LaLonde's aggro-fusion chops." Reviewing the album for AllMusic, Ned Raggett noted that "it's pretty easy to see in retrospect how much of a melange went into the group's work. Nods but thankfully few outright steals to everything from Frank Zappa's arch humor and Funkadelic's sprawl to the Police's early, spare effectiveness crop up and, indeed, so does plenty of Metallica." He contended that "something about Frizzle Fry is ultimately and perfectly of its time and place."

== Track listing ==
All lyrics are written by Les Claypool; all music is composed by Primus (Claypool, Larry LaLonde and Tim Alexander), except where noted.

| No. | Title | Music | Length |
|---|---|---|---|
| 1. | "To Defy the Laws of Tradition" | Claypool, Todd Huth, Alexander | 6:42 |
| 2. | "Groundhog's Day" | Claypool, Huth, Alexander | 4:58 |
| 3. | "Too Many Puppies" | | 3:57 |
| 4. | "Mr. Knowitall" | | 3:51 |
| 5. | "Frizzle Fry" | Claypool, Huth, LaLonde, Alexander | 6:04 |
| 6. | "John the Fisherman" | Claypool, Huth, Alexander | 3:37 |
| 7. | "You Can't Kill Michael Malloy" (performed by Matt Winegar) | Winegar | 0:25 |
| 8. | "The Toys Go Winding Down" | | 4:35 |
| 9. | "Pudding Time" | Claypool, Huth, Alexander | 4:08 |
| 10. | "Sathington Willoughby" (Title misspelled as "Sathington Willoby" on back cover) | | 0:24 |
| 11. | "Spegetti Western" | | 5:43 |
| 12. | "Harold of the Rocks" | Claypool, Huth, Alexander | 6:17 |
| 13. | "To Defy" | Claypool, Huth, Alexander | 0:36 |
| Total length: | | | 51:23 |

2002 reissue bonus track
| No. | Title | Writer(s) | Length |
|---|---|---|---|
| 14. | "Hello Skinny/Constantinople" (The Residents cover) | The Residents | 4:48 |
| Total length: | | | 56:11 |

== Personnel ==
Writing, performance and production credits are adapted from the album liner notes.

=== Personnel ===
==== Primus ====
- Les Claypool – vocals, bass, electric upright bass, double bass
- Larry LaLonde – electric guitar, acoustic guitar
- Tim "Herb" Alexander – drums, percussion

==== Additional musicians ====
- Todd Huth – second acoustic guitar on "The Toys Go Winding Down"; guitar melodies (tracks 1, 2, 5, 6, 9, 12, 13)
- Matt Winegar – composer of "You Can't Kill Michael Malloy"
- Stan Hearne – vocals on "Harold of the Rocks"
- “Fart Sandwich Posse” (gang vocals on “John the Fisherman)
  - Trouz Cuevas
  - Mike Bordin
  - Clem Donahue
  - Deanne Franklin
  - Brain Mantia
  - Flipjax Libby
  - Smiley
- Sathington Willoughby Orchestra
  - Les Claypool a.k.a. "Snap" – banjo, string bass
  - Larry LaLonde a.k.a. "Chunker" – archtop acoustic guitar
  - Tim Alexander a.k.a. "Herb" – toy organ
  - Matt Winegar a.k.a. "Exxon" – toy piano
  - Todd Huth – acoustic guitar

==== Production ====
- Primus – production
- Matt "Exxon" Winegar – production
- Ron Rigler – engineering
- Matt Murman – second engineer
- John Golden – mastering
- Stephen Marcussen – remastering (2002 remaster)

==== Visual Art ====
- Lance "Link" Montoya – sculpture
- "Snap" (Les Claypool) – airbrushing, cartooning
- Paul Haggard – jacket design, photography

=== Studios ===
- Different Fur, San Francisco – recording
- Marcussen Mastering, Los Angeles – remastering

== Charts ==
Chart performance for Frizzle Fry
| Chart (1994) | Peak position |
|---|---|
| Australian Albums (ARIA) | 178 |
