= Todd Huth =

American guitarist (born 1963)

- Born: Todd Richard Huth; March 13, 1963 (age 63); Pinole, California, U.S.
- Genres: Rock
- Occupations: Singer; musician; songwriter
- Instruments: Vocals; guitar
- Years active: 1983–present
- Formerly of: Primus

Todd Richard Huth (born March 13, 1963) is an American guitarist, best known as an original member of the band Primus, along with bassist/lyricist Les Claypool.

Huth and Claypool began playing together, along with a drum machine, in or around 1984, originally calling themselves Primate until about 1986 when they changed their band name to Primus. With the lineup of Huth, Claypool, and Jay Lane, Primus became an underground sensation in and around San Francisco, prompting them to record a demo tape, Sausage, to distribute at their shows. Around 1989, however, with his wife expecting a child, Huth decided to leave Primus to dedicate time to his family. Huth was replaced by Larry LaLonde, an old friend of Claypool's who remains in the band to this day. Huth wrote most of the guitar parts on "Suck on This" and "Frizzle Fry". Shortly before departing the band, while Primus was searching for a new drummer Huth and Claypool auditioned Tim Alexander who would eventually become the new drummer for the band.

After Primus went on to mainstream success without him, Huth reunited with Claypool and Lane in 1994 to produce an album on Claypool's label, Prawn Song Records. Unable to use their original band name, Primus, the trio instead adopted the title of one of their original demos, Sausage. The album was entitled Riddles Are Abound Tonight. Following that project, Huth formed a band, Porch, with former Today Is The Day bassist Christopher Frey and former Samiam drummer Dave Ayer. They released a single, eponymously titled album on Mammoth Records (via Claypool's Prawn Song label) in 1994.

In 2000, Huth again reunited with Les Claypool and toured with Claypool's side-project, Les Claypool's Fearless Flying Frog Brigade.

Huth's guitar style is quite distinctive, combining creative use of dissonance with heavy use of distortion. His style is influenced by blues, incorporating extensive use of bends, and the blues scale.
