= Tim Alexander (drummer) =

American drummer (born 1965)

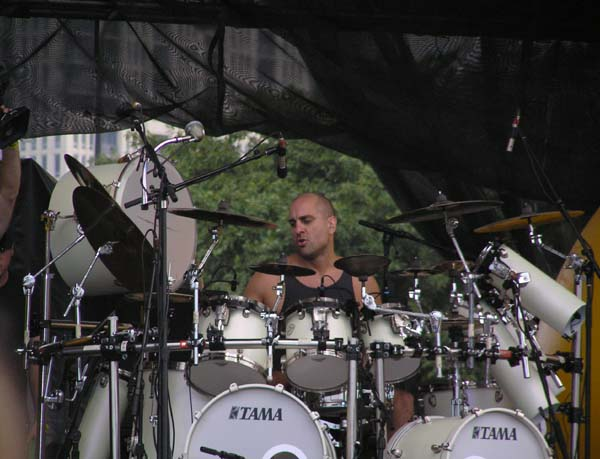
- Alexander performing with Primus in 2005

Background information
- Also known as: Herb
- Born: Timothy Wayne Alexander; April 10, 1965 (age 61); Marine Corps Air Station Cherry Point, U.S.
- Genres: Alternative metal; funk metal; progressive rock; experimental rock
- Occupation: Musician
- Instruments: Drums; guitar
- Years active: 1985–present
- Labels: Prawn Song; Interscope; Royal Potato Family
- Formerly of: Primus; A Perfect Circle; Puscifer

Timothy Wayne "Herb" Alexander (born April 10, 1965) is an American musician, best known as the former drummer for the rock band Primus. Prior to Primus, Alexander was the drummer for Arizona's Major Lingo from 1985-1990. Alexander has been in Primus across three stints; he initially left the band in 1996 and rejoined in 2003 before leaving again in 2010 and re-joining in 2013, again departing in October 2024. Alexander has played in several projects with Tool frontman Maynard James Keenan including the bands Puscifer and A Perfect Circle. He earned the nickname "Herb" from his Primus bandmates after carrying a fanny pack full with herbs like ginseng that he would distribute.

== Biography ==
Alexander joined Primus by replacing Jay Lane (along with Larry LaLonde who replaced Todd Huth) in 1988, and lasted until 1996. Les Claypool spoke of Alexander's playing in an interview with Bass Player: "[He] is a very precise player. Even when we're really stretching on something, you can rarely tell that we're still a band that doesn't rehearse much. And a huge part of that is because of Tim". Alexander has played on the majority of Primus's discography, including some of the band's most well known albums such as Frizzle Fry (1990), Sailing the Seas of Cheese (1991), Pork Soda (1993) and Tales from the Punchbowl (1995).

Following Alexander's departure from Primus, he went on to form his own group, Laundry, which released on Claypool's label Prawn Song Records. They put out two albums and were based in the Bay area of San Francisco. On September 25, 2013, Rolling Stone announced via an interview with Claypool that Alexander would be rejoining Primus, with a possible recording session taking place as early as November. Previous drummer Jay Lane would be moving on to other projects including his former band Ratdog.

On April 21, 2024 Alexander released an album titled "All That Syncs Must Diverge" with saxophonist Skerik and bassist Timm Mason, under the name Sound Cipher. The album was recorded at Studio Litho and released through Royal Potato Family Records.

Alexander has been hailed for his "polyrhythmic" playing.

Tim has stated that his reasons for leaving Primus again, in October 2024, were due to ongoing health issues and to be closer to his family.

== Personal life ==
On July 18, 2014, Alexander had a heart attack, and underwent open heart surgery. He had another heart attack in 2016. Alexander operated a cider company based in Bellingham, Washington, called Herb's Cider.
