= Four Foot Shack =

Studio album by Duo de Twang
- Released: February 4, 2014
- Genre: Americana; bluegrass; country; hillbilly; rock
- Length: 56:24
- Label: ATO Records/Prawn Song Records
- Producer: Les Claypool

Professional ratings
Aggregate scores
Source	Rating
Metacritic	61/100
Review scores
Source	Rating
AllMusic	3.5/5 stars
American Songwriter	3.5/5 stars
The Austin Chronicle	2/5 stars
Blurt	3/5 stars
Consequence of Sound	C-

Four Foot Shack is the debut album of Duo de Twang, a country music duo formed by Primus bassist and vocalist Les Claypool and M.I.R.V. guitarist Bryan Kehoe. This album contains one original song and fourteen cover songs (although many are covers of Primus or Les Claypool songs). It was released on February 4, 2014, by ATO Records.

== Track listing ==
No.	Title	Writer(s)	Length
1.	"Four Foot Shack"	Claypool	0:42
2.	"Wynona's Big Brown Beaver"	Les Claypool, Larry LaLonde, Tim Alexander	4:47
3.	"Amos Moses"	Jerry Reed	3:34
4.	"Red State Girl"	Claypool	3:02
5.	"The Bridge Came Tumblin' Down"	Tom Connors	3:29
6.	"Boonville Stomp"	Claypool	4:59
7.	"Stayin' Alive"	Barry Gibb, Robin Gibb, Maurice Gibb	4:46
8.	"Rumble of the Diesel"	Claypool	4:05
9.	"Pipe Line"	Brian Carman, Bob Spickard	2:18
10.	"Buzzards of Green Hill"	Claypool	4:04
11.	"Hendershot"	Claypool	2:52
12.	"Man in the Box"	Jerry Cantrell, Layne Staley	5:12
13.	"D's Diner"	Claypool	4:25
14.	"Battle of New Orleans"	Jimmy Driftwood	4:16
15.	"Jerry Was a Race Car Driver"	Claypool, LaLonde, Alexander	3:55

== Song origins ==
Covers featured on Four Foot Shack and their original artists:

- "Wynona's Big Brown Beaver" by Primus, originally on the album Tales from the Punchbowl.
- "Amos Moses" by Jerry Reed. The song was also covered by Claypool on Primus' Rhinoplasty.
- "Red State Girl" by Les Claypool on Of Fungi and Foe.
- "The Bridge Came Tumblin' Down" by Tom Connors.
- "Booneville Stomp" by Les Claypool, originally on Of Fungi and Foe.
- "Stayin' Alive" by the Bee Gees.
- "Rumble of the Diesel" by Les Claypool, originally on Of Whales and Woe.
- "Pipeline" by The Chantays.
- "Buzzards of Green Hill" by Colonel Les Claypool's Fearless Flying Frog Brigade, originally appearing on Purple Onion.
- "Hendershot" by Les Claypool, originally on the album Highball with the Devil.
- "Man in the Box" by Alice in Chains.
- "D's Diner" by Les Claypool, originally on Purple Onion.
- "Battle of New Orleans" written by Jimmy Driftwood.
- "Jerry Was a Race Car Driver" by Primus, from the album Sailing the Seas of Cheese.

== Personnel ==
- Les Claypool - Bass, Vocals, Tambourine
- Bryan Kehoe - Guitars & back-up vocals.
- Wylie Woods - Mandolin & back-up vocals (1, 12, 14).
- Recorded at Rancho Relaxo Studio.
- Mastered by Stephen Marcussen for Marcussen Mastering, Hollywood, CA.
- Design & layout by Reuben Rude.
- Cover painting "Stranded Yellow House" by Dave van Patten.
- Photos by Jeremy Scott.

== Charts ==
Chart performance for Four Foot Shack
Chart	Peak position
US Billboard 200	98
US Top Alternative Albums (Billboard)	12
US Top Rock Albums (Billboard)	25
