= Animals Should Not Try to Act Like People =

Video and EP by Primus
- Released: October 7, 2003
- Recorded: June 2003
- Studios: Rancho Relaxo, Sebastopol, California
- Genres: Space rock; progressive rock
- Length: 28:18 (CD)
- Labels: Interscope, Prawn Song
- Producers: Les Claypool, Primus (CD); Reuben Raffael, Zoltron (DVD)

Primus video chronology
Videoplasty (1998)	Animals Should Not Try to Act Like People (2003)	Hallucino-Genetics (2004)

Primus audio chronology
Antipop (1999)	Animals Should Not Try to Act Like People (2003)	They Can't All Be Zingers (2006)

Animals Should Not Try to Act Like People is a career-spanning retrospective DVD plus bonus EP by American band Primus, released on October 7, 2003. The title was inspired by a crayon-made story book written by guitarist Larry LaLonde's son; the cover depicts a sculpture made by long-time Primus collaborator Lance "Link" Montoya. The DVD features all of the band's music videos to date, plus short films and live footage from as far back as 1986, whereas the bonus EP features five new songs written and recorded specifically for this release. When promoting the release, bassist Les Claypool remarked that "It seems of late that bands are adding supplemental DVD material to their album releases to promote record sales. We've done the opposite. We've added a supplemental audio recording of brand new music to an extremely comprehensive DVD of classic visuals."

Animals Should Not Try to Act Like People shows the return of drummer Tim Alexander to the lineup, who had previously left the band in 1996. He joins Claypool and LaLonde in performing on the EP, as well as providing commentary for the DVD. Claypool has claimed that two of the five new songs on the EP were written within the first 45 minutes of the lineup working together again, and "Pilcher's Squad" was said to have been written and recorded within a single afternoon. This is also the only Primus release to feature one of the band's earliest drummers, Tim "Curveball" Wright, filmed performing "Sgt. Baker".

== DVD features ==
=== Music videos ===
1. "John the Fisherman" * (from Frizzle Fry) - Directed by Mark Kohr
2. "Too Many Puppies" (from Frizzle Fry) - Directed by Kevin Kerslake
3. "Jerry Was a Race Car Driver" * (from Sailing the Seas of Cheese) - Directed by Mark Kohr
4. "Tommy the Cat" * (from Sailing the Seas of Cheese) - Directed by Mark Kohr
5. "My Name Is Mud" * (from Pork Soda) - Directed by Mark Kohr
6. "Mr. Krinkle" * (from Pork Soda) - Directed by Mark Kohr
7. "DMV" * (from Pork Soda) - Directed by Mark Kohr
8. "Wynona's Big Brown Beaver" * (from Tales from the Punchbowl) - Directed by Les Claypool
9. "Southbound Pachyderm" (from Tales from the Punchbowl) - Directed by Les Claypool
10. "Shake Hands with Beef" (from the Brown Album) - Directed by Les Claypool
11. "Over the Falls" (from the Brown Album) - Directed by Les Claypool
12. "Lacquer Head" (from Antipop) - Directed by Les Claypool - (Banned by MTV)
13. "The Devil Went Down to Georgia" (Charlie Daniels cover, from Rhinoplasty) - Directed by Mike Johnson

* Optional commentary track featuring Les, Larry and Tim.

=== Short films ===
- Cheesy Home Video - transfer of the video with the same name, edited to exclude the music videos.
- Horrible Swill - transfer of the video with the same name, previously available exclusively to the fan club.
- Horrible Men - previously unreleased assortment of clips from on-stage, backstage and in the studio.
- The Making of "Mr. Krinkle" - previously unreleased short on the making of the music video.
- The Making of "Wynona" - previously unreleased short on the making of the music video.
- The Making of the Brown Album - transfer of a segment from the Videoplasty video.

=== Live performances ===
- Radio Relics - Recorded at Stanford University's KZSU college radio station for a campus-only cable channel in 1989
  - "To Defy the Laws of Tradition"
  - "Too Many Puppies"
  - "Frizzle Fry"
- New Year's 93-94 - Recorded at the Henry J. Kaiser Auditorium in Oakland, on New Year's Eve 1993-1994
  - "Groundhog's Day"
  - "Mr. Krinkle"
- Woodstock 94 - Recorded at the 25th anniversary of the Woodstock Festival in Saugerties, New York in 1994
  - "Those Damned Blue Collar Tweekers"
  - "My Name is Mud (Bootleg Quality)"
- Florida 95 - Recorded in West Palm Beach, Florida during the Punchbowl tour in 1995
  - "Pudding Time"
  - "Southbound Pachyderm"
- "Duchess and the Proverbial Mind Spread" - Recorded at Irving Plaza in New York for HBO's Reverb in 1998 (Erroneously listed as "Kalamazoo live" on some pressings)
- "Lacquer Head" - Recorded during the Family Values Tour on Halloween in 1999
- Rarities
  - "Sgt. Baker" - Recorded at a rent party at Kommotion in San Francisco sometime between 1986 and 1988
  - "Groundhog's Day" - Recorded at the Omni in Oakland in late 1988
  - "Tommy the Cat" - Recorded by Bob Cock and the Yellow Sock, 1991, and venue not noted

=== Other features ===
The DVD also includes an illustrated discography and slideshow of promotional photographs. Easter eggs include a short video clip of Bob Cock in heaven and an interview.

== EP track listing ==
All lyrics written by Les Claypool. All music written by Les Claypool, Larry LaLonde and Tim Alexander.

No.	Title	Length
1.	"The Carpenter and the Dainty Bride"	6:35
2.	"Pilcher's Squad"	1:54
3.	"Mary the Ice Cube"	4:37
4.	"The Last Superpower aka Rapscallion"	7:16
5.	"My Friend Fats"	7:55
Total length:		28:17

== Critical reception ==
Professional ratings
Review scores
Source	Rating
AllMusic	3/5 stars

In his review for AllMusic, Greg Prato predicts that "while hardcore fans will want to hear what Claypool and the boys have been up to lately in the recording studio, the main attraction of Animals is its exceptional DVD." He notes that "early on, it appeared as though Primus was more about songwriting, before later reinventing itself as a Grateful Dead-worshipping outfit that loved to put jamming before songwriting", and that "fans hoping that Primus would return to streamlined songs will be disappointed, as the band has picked up right where it left off" on the new EP.

== Personnel ==
- Les Claypool — bass, vocals
- Larry LaLonde — guitar on all tracks, except as noted below.
  - Todd Huth — guitar on the 1988 recording of "Groundhog's Day" and "Sgt. Baker"
- Tim Alexander — drums on all tracks, except as noted below.
  - Bryan "Brain" Mantia — drums on "Shake Hands with Beef", "Over the Falls", "Lacquer Head" and "Duchess and the Proverbial Mind Spread"
  - Jay Lane — drums on the 1988 recording of "Groundhog's Day"
  - Tim "Curveball" Wright — drums on "Sgt. Baker"
- "The Devil Went Down to Georgia" performed by Festus Clamrod and The El Sobrante Twangers
  - Les Claypool — vocals and bass
  - Larry LaLonde — banjo
  - Bryan "Brain" Mantia — drums
  - Mark "Mirv" Haggard — slide guitar and voice of Johnny
  - Bryan Kehoe — voice of the Devil
  - Violina Misteriosa (Irene Sazer) — violin

All lyrics written by Claypool, all music written by Primus, except "The Devil Went Down to Georgia" by the Charlie Daniels Band.

== Charts ==
Album

Chart (2003)	Peak position
US Billboard 200	44

DVD

Chart (2004)	Peak position
Australian Music DVDs (ARIA)	22

== Certifications ==
Region	Certification	Certified units/sales
United States (RIAA) DVD	Platinum	100,000^{^}
^{^} Shipments figures based on certification alone.
