= Of Fungi and Foe =

Studio album by Les Claypool
- Released: March 17, 2009
- Recorded: 2008
- Genre: Experimental rock, progressive rock
- Length: 49:38
- Label: Prawn Song
- Producer: Les Claypool

Les Claypool chronology
Of Whales and Woe (2006)	Of Fungi and Foe (2009)

Professional ratings
Review scores
Source	Rating
Allmusic	3/5 stars
DecoyMusic.com	3/5 stars
The Los Angeles Times	2.5/4 stars

Of Fungi and Foe is the second solo album by Les Claypool. The album was released on the March 17, 2009. The album featured Eugene Hütz, Paulo Baldi, Mike Dillon, Lapland Miclovik, Sam Bass, Cage Claypool, and Bryonn Bain.

Claypool stated:

Sometime back I was commissioned to write soundtrack music for two projects that promised to have quite a bit of very intense and unique imagery. One was for an interactive game about a meteor that hits Earth and brings intelligence to the mushrooms within the crash proximity and the other was about a three thousand pound wild boar that terrorizes the marijuana fields of Northern California. Obviously the makers of the subsequent Mushroom Men game and Pig Hunt film were very aware of my tastes and perspectives because the music oozed from me in such a natural way that I believe it came as much from my pores as it did my mind. This music became the foundation of the songs that fill this collection. With a few added tidbits and a bit of gypsy sauce, I inflict upon you... OF FUNGI AND FOE

All Lyrics Written by Les Claypool

== Track listing ==
1. "Mushroom Men" – 3:15
2. "Amanitas" – 4:27
3. "Red State Girl" – 3:05
4. "Booneville Stomp" – 4:57
5. "What Would Sir George Martin Do" – 5:50
6. "You Can't Tell Errol Anything" – 3:55
7. "Bite Out of Life" – 4:34
8. "Kazoo" – 4:12
9. "Primed by 29" – 3:26
10. "Pretty Little Song" – 4:09
11. "Of Fungi and Foe" – 1:52
12. "Ol' Rosco" – 5:58

== Personnel ==
- Les Claypool – bass guitars, percussion, penny whistle, "uber-dogs of doom", vocals
- Mike Dillon – tabla (3), marimba solo (5), vibraphone (6, 8)
- Sam Bass – cello (8, 10, 12)
- Paulo Baldi – drums (7)
- Eugene Hütz – vocals (7), acoustic guitar (7)
- Cage Claypool – slide whistle (5)
- Bryonn Bain – additional lyric/vocal (10)

== Production ==
- Produced & engineered by Les Claypool.
- All songs written by Claypool, Long Corn Publishing (BMI) except "Bite Out of Life" written by Claypool [Long Corn Publishing (BMI)] & Hütz [Hütz Muson (ASCAP)].
- Recorded at Rancho Relaxo, Studio Assistant: Derek "D Duck" Walls.
- Mastered by Stephen Marcussen for Marcussen Mastering, Hollywood, California.
- Cover paintings: Travis Louie.
- Design & layout: Zoltron.
- Live photos: Ross Pelton.
- Project supervisor: Leanne Lajoie.
- Management: Andy Gould & Leanne Lajoie for Spectacle Group
