= Zoltron =

American rock music poster designer

Zoltron is an American rock music poster designer, street artist, and creative director. His posters are included in the collections of Victoria Albert Museum, London, de Young fine arts museum, San Francisco, SFMOMA, Los Angeles Museum of Contemporary Art, Boston Museum of Fine Art, the US Library of Congress, Museum of Pop Culture, Seattle and The Rock and Roll Hall of Fame Museum. He is secretive and carefully conceals his identity behind his pseudonym.

Zoltron is known for his iconic rock art for bands like Primus, Iggy Pop, Blondie, Black Keys, NIN, Jerry Garcia, Soundgarden, Alice in Chains, Dweezil Zappa, Queens of the Stone Age, Ween, The Melvins, Les Claypool, Pussy Riot, Jerry Cantrell, PJ Harvey, Die Antwoord, Widespread Panic, Devo.

He has been awarded a 2006 Recording Industry Association of America (RIAA) certified gold disc for his work as producer of the grammy-award nominated alternative rock band Primus album Hallucino-Genetics, and a 2004 RIAA certified platinum disc for the Primus album Animals Should Not Try to Act Like People.

== Early career ==
Zoltron was inspired by his older brothers and sisters' album covers, which he pinned to his bedroom wall. He bought albums simply for their cover art, and would "use the record as a frisbee". Among his major early influences he cites punk rock fliers, and the art of Hipgnosis designer Storm Thorgeson. His first professional poster was made for a The Residents concert at the Fillmore Theatre in San Francisco in 1996.

== Street art and poster design ==
He is a street artist whose large murals have covered walls in the San Francisco Bay Area. The works are characterized by a strongly anti-establishment theme, and frequently use Day of the Dead and memento mori imagery.

His mural of a penitent Ronald MacDonald in the Mission District of San Francisco was featured in a Huffington Post story about street art that challenged the McDonaldization of society. He said, "While I was drawing Ronald as an evil tyrant, I saw a glint of compassion in his eyes, like he was caught in an existential crisis... Maybe suddenly he realized that he was solely responsible for massive rainforest destruction & onset adolescent diabetes. So rather than draw him as an enemy, I decided to draw him as a born-again humanitarian, an empathetic leader... A compassionate clown." Hi-Fructose published a photo story of the dialogue in paint that soon obscured the image.

He has designed iconic posters for the live music scene, which have captured the attention of rock audiences and perceptive gallerists. His work has been exhibited in galleries in San Francisco, New York, Washington DC and Portland by curators keen to capture the unique spirit of the West Coast street art scene. His imagery has made an international impact, too, and he has participated in exhibits at galleries in Mexico, Paris, and Bordeaux, France. Zoltron's "Primus and the Chocolate Factory" and "The Melvins" posters are featured in a four page spread about him in the bilingual edition of HEY! Modern Art & Pop Culture. In 2010 his Red Vic Movie House poster design for Wes Anderson's movie of Fantastic Mr. Fox was featured in a Halloween exhibit at Spoke Art gallery in San Francisco. The poster was followed by a design for Martin Scorsese's 1980 classic movie, Raging Bull. He also designed a Red Vic poster for Willy Wonka and the Chocolate Factory. Zoltron's posters are in the collections of major museums as examples of early 21st century popular culture iconography, including the Victoria & Albert Museum, the Los Angeles County Museum of Art, Boston Museum of Fine Art, The de Young Museum in San Francisco, SFMOMA, Rock & Roll Hall of Fame Library & Archives and the U.S. Library of Congress.

Many contemporary rock stars are Zoltron fans. When Dave Grohl's Foo Fighters played a private pop-up gig at the Blue Note, a 150-person capacity club in Napa, California, Grohl asked Zoltron to design a collectible limited-edition poster for the audience.

== Primus ==
Zoltron began his career in the rock and roll world in 1996 at Prawn Song Design, a freelance graphic design company founded by Les Claypool of Primus, Larry LaLonde and Adam Gates, focusing on the exploding opportunities of Web-based design in the mid-1990s, creating the entire online catalog for the record labels Interscope Records, Geffen, Aftermath, Death Row Records, and A & M.

By 1998 he had become Creative Director for Prawn Song, responsible for the design and creative direction of all Primus and Les Claypool related projects, including: Antipop, Videoplasty, Rhinoplasty, Hallucino-Genetics: Live 2004, Green Naugahyde, Animals Should Not Try to Act Like People, They Can't All Be Zingers, Blame It on the Fish: An Abstract Look at the 2003 Primus Tour de Fromage, Oysterhead, The Grand Pecking Order, Colonel Claypool's Bucket of Bernie Brains, The Big Eyeball in the Sky, and Les Claypool's solo projects Purple Onion, Of Whales and Woe, Of Fungi and Foe, and Electric Apricot: Quest For Festeroo.

In 2003 Zoltron produced the platinum-selling, retrospective Primus DVD, 'Animals Should Not Try to Act Like People,' an interactive DVD experience spanning the band's history dating back to early bootlegs and live radio performances. Primus' singer/bassist Les Claypool remarked that, "It seems of late that bands are adding supplemental DVD material to their album releases to promote record sales. We've done the opposite. We've added a supplemental audio recording of brand-new music to an extremely comprehensive DVD of classic visuals." In his review for AllMusic, Greg Prato predicted that "while hardcore fans will want to hear what Claypool and the boys have been up to lately in the recording studio, the main attraction of Animals is its exceptional DVD."

In 2011, Zoltron initiated a limited-edition poster project for Primus, commissioning artists to produce hand-printed, individually signed, and numbered silkscreen posters; each poster used a new image for each of the shows on their tour, which spanned across the United States. There are now 400 unique 18 in × 24 in (460 mm × 610 mm) designs, chronicling every gig the band has played with great variety. Zoltron's work for Primus included a collaboration with designer Zombie Yeti to produce a "frizzle-fry acid trip" design for Primus-themed pinball tables, built as a limited edition by Stern Pinball.

== Sticker Robot and political activism ==
In early 2002, Zoltron founded the sticker printing company, Sticker Robot. During Barack Obama's campaign for the US Presidency, Sticker Robot produced stickers of Shepard Fairey's famous Barack Obama "Hope" poster. The first printing was for 5,000; by the time of the election the run had increased to 500,000 and the stickers had become a collectible. Zoltron produced his own Obama poster, which was photographed and commented on in a Time magazine article. The poster was shown in "a giant art exhibit" in Washington D.C. held to celebrate the inauguration.
