= Fancy (video) =

Video by Les Claypool
- Released: May 29, 2007
- Genre: Alternative rock
- Label: Prawn Song Records

Les Claypool chronology
5 Gallons Of Diesel (2005)	Fancy (2007)

Fancy is a DVD of live concert footage compiled from the Les Claypool's Fancy Band 2006 tour. Filmed by Jim "Jimbo" Charna, Jeremy "staunchy" Sewell and Joe “MoJo”Hannaher, it was released by Prawn Song Records on May 29, 2007. The soundtrack combines soundboard and "taper (Jimbos)" recordings for concert-like experience.

== Chapter Listing ==
- "Up On The Roof"
- "Of Whales and Woe"
- "Rumble of the Diesel"
- "Long in the Tooth"
- "Vernon the Company Man"
- "Holy Mackerel"
- "Phantom Patriot"
- "Cosmic Highway"
- "Filipino Ray"
- "The Big Eyeball in the Sky"
- "D's Diner"
- "One Better"

(encore)

- "Running the Gauntlet"
- "American Life/Iowan Girl"
- "Lust Stings"

== Credits ==
=== Featuring ===
- Les Claypool - bass, vocals
- Skerik - tenor and baritone saxophones
- Mike Dillon - vibraphone, marimba, percussion
- Gabby La La - sitar, ukulele, theremin, vocals
- Paulo Baldi - drums

=== Taken From Shows ===
- 06/21/06 - Austin, Texas
- 07/07/06 - Ft Lauderdale, Florida
- 07/15/06 - NYC, New York
- 07/17/06 - Boston, Mass.
- 07/18/06 - Providence, Rhode Island
- 07/22/06 - Cleveland, Ohio
