= Bass banjo =

Stringed instrument

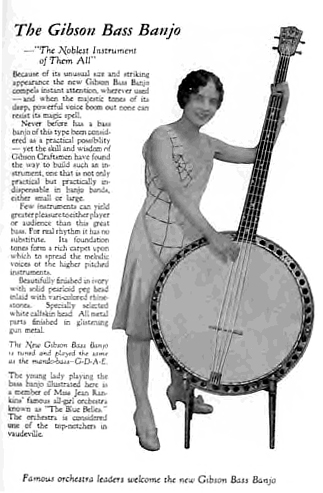
- Other names: Cello banjo, banjocello
- Classification: String instrument (plucked)
- Hornbostel–Sachs classification: 321.322-5
- Developed: Late 19th century

Playing range
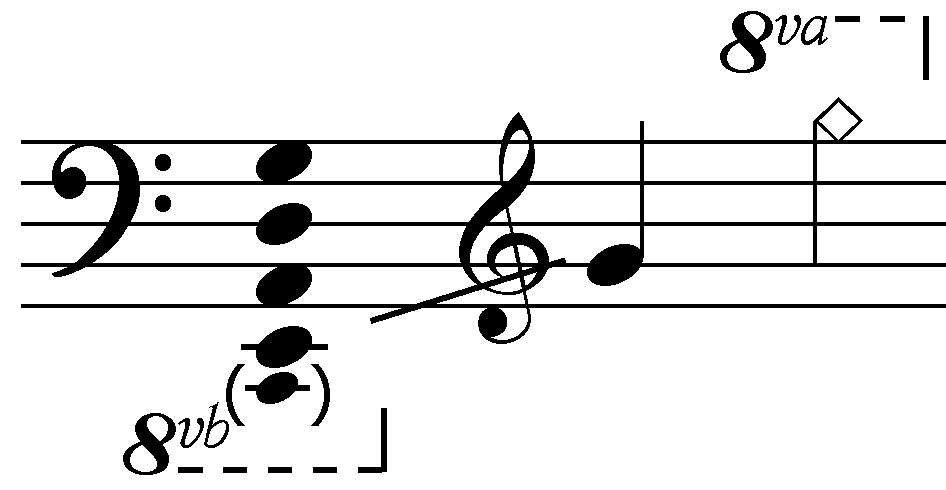

Related instruments
- banjo; mandocello; cello; bass guitar; double bass

There are multiple instruments referred to as a bass banjo. The first to enter real production was the five-string cello banjo, tuned one octave below a five-string banjo. This was followed by a four-string cello banjo, tuned CGDA in the same range as a cello or mandocello, and modified upright bass versions tuned EADG. More recently, true bass banjos, tuned EADG and played in conventional horizontal fashion, have been introduced.

== Five-string cello banjo ==
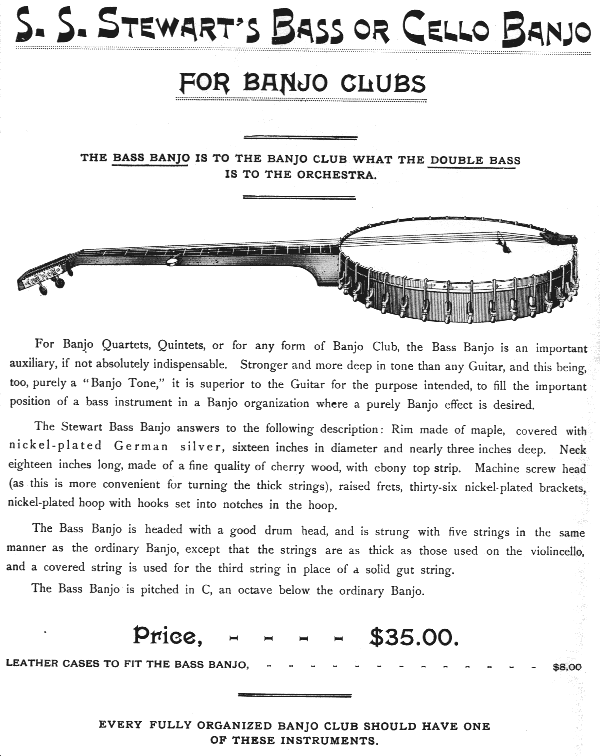
Advertising copy for Stewart 5-string cello, c. 1898

The five-string cello banjo was originally a gut-stringed instrument with a 3 in (76 mm) deep 16 in (410 mm) diameter rim, marketed by S.S. Stewart in 1889. Advertising copy used the terms "bass banjo" and "cello banjo" to refer to the same instrument.

Other banjo makers manufactured similar instruments, including A.C. Fairbanks, with a 12 3/8 in (310 mm) diameter head and a 29 1/2 in (750 mm) scale length and A.A. Farland, with 12 1/2 in (320 mm) head and a 28 1/2 in (720 mm) scale. Gold Tone is the only contemporary manufacturer.

== Four-string cello banjo ==
In 1919, Gibson began manufacturing a 4-string cello banjo, known as the CB-4. Other vintage manufacturers of four-string bass banjos include Bacon & Day. Gold Tone is the only contemporary manufacturer.

== Gibson bass banjo ==
Gibson produced a separate instrument called a "bass banjo" from 1930 to 1933. This was a 4-string instrument, played as an upright bass, with a stand substituting for a spike. It was tuned EADG, the same as Gibson's mando-bass.

== Bassjo ==
The Bassjo, also referred to as the banjo bass in a 2006 article featuring Les Claypool on the cover of Bassplayer Magazine was made by luthier Dan Maloney. Maloney was a friend of Claypool's approximately ten years ago when Claypool asked him to construct a guitar with "a banjo body and a bass neck ("Les Does More" 43)." The Bassjo can be heard on Claypool's 2006 album Of Whales and Woe on the track "Iowan Gal", as well as Primus' "Captain Shiner" from the album Tales from the Punchbowl.

== Bass banjolele ==
The bass banjolele, is often made by individual luthiers and is without much mainstream use and production. They are often tuned E_{1}–A_{1}–D_{2}–G_{2}. It is often just another version of a U-bass. It is often slightly longer than a U-bass.

== Gold Tone bass banjo ==
Gold Tone Music Group produces a commercial version of the bass banjo. It has a 32 in (810 mm) scale and a 13 in (330 mm) pot.

== Heftone upright ==
An unusual variation is the Heftone bass, which combines a large, 22 in (560 mm) banjo pot with an upright spindle to produce an upright bass banjo.

== Gallery ==
Bass and cello banjos
Gold Tone four-string cello banjo	A.C. Fairbanks "Whyte Laydie" No. 2 in (51 mm) 5-string cello banjo Circa 1903, S/N 22924	1902 A.A. Farland 5-string cello banjo	Gold Tone bass banjo
Gold Tone four-string cello banjo	Five-string cello banjo and a banjeaurine from S.S. Stewart		Gold Tone bass banjo
1929 Gibson Bass Banjo at the American Banjo Museum
