= Primus & the Chocolate Factory with the Fungi Ensemble =

Studio album by Primus
- Released: October 21, 2014
- Genres: Experimental rock, psychedelic rock, funk rock, avant-garde
- Length: 40:22
- Labels: ATO, Prawn Song
- Producer: Les Claypool

Primus chronology
Green Naugahyde (2011)	Primus & the Chocolate Factory with the Fungi Ensemble (2014)	The Desaturating Seven (2017)

Professional ratings
Aggregate scores
Source	Rating
Metacritic	61/100
Review scores
Source	Rating
AllMusic	3.5/5 stars
Exclaim!	(8/10)
MusicOMH	3.5/5 stars
Spectrum Culture	3.25 stars on a 5 point scale

Primus & the Chocolate Factory with the Fungi Ensemble is the eighth studio album by American rock group Primus. The album is a re-imagining of the soundtrack of the 1971 film Willy Wonka & the Chocolate Factory. The album was released on October 21, 2014. It is the first full-length album with Tim "Herb" Alexander since 1995's Tales from the Punchbowl.

== Background ==
Lead singer and bassist Les Claypool told Rolling Stone of his fascination with Willy Wonka & the Chocolate Factory, the 1971 film adaptation of Roald Dahl's novel Charlie and the Chocolate Factory: "I don't think it was until Jaws came along that I was more obsessed with a film, when I started drawing sharks all over my binders and notebooks. Prior to that it was everything Wonka."

During an interview at The Greene Space, Les Claypool explained that one idea for his next record was a cover of The Beatles' Magical Mystery Tour. Although this project never came to fruition, he stated that he was glad it didn't work out since he later found out that The Flaming Lips were producing their cover of Sgt. Pepper's Lonely Hearts Club Band around the same time.

== Music ==
The track "I Want It Now" is the first Primus song to feature guitarist Larry "Ler" Lalonde on lead vocals.

Drummer Tim Alexander used an intentionally unusual drum kit throughout the album. The drum set contained various rototoms, frying pans, a HAPI UFO drum, and more in addition to his already-large drum kit. About the odd choice of percussion, Alexander explains "It went back to the original meaning of a contraption, which is what a drum set initially was when they were first being put together in the early 1900s. Putting all these things together, I just had all these different sounds to work with them. It made me have to think about what I’m doing to create rhythms using all this stuff."

== Promotion ==
To tie in with the album's Wonka theme, Primus began selling exclusive chocolate "Primus Bars" at live performances. The varieties are named after Primus songs: "Mr. Krinkle Bars" and "Pork Soda Bars" (from Pork Soda), "Professor Nutbutter Bars" (from Tales from the Punchbowl), and "Bastard Bars". "The tour and the album are solely a marketing tool just so we can sell candy bars," jokes Claypool. "That's the whole impetus of this entire project. Because the fucking recording industry rolled over and let this Internet shit all over us. So we had to come up with another income stream, so we're making chocolate bars because you can’t digitize a chocolate bar — yet." On Hollywood, limited edition 'Pork Soda' bars were available. The last live performance of the album, September 19, 2015, was a live Pay-Per-View event on TourGigs.com

== Track listing ==
All tracks are written by Leslie Bricusse & Anthony Newley, arranged by Les Claypool (bass), Larry LaLonde (guitar), Tim "Herb" Alexander (percussion).

No.	Title	Length
1.	"Hello Wonkites"	2:00
2.	"Candy Man"	4:25
3.	"Cheer Up Charlie"	3:35
4.	"Golden Ticket"	5:07
5.	"Lermaninoff"	0:04
6.	"Pure Imagination"	5:28
7.	"Oompa Augustus"	1:41
8.	"Semi-Wondrous Boat Ride"	2:35
9.	"Oompa Violet"	1:45
10.	"I Want It Now"	4:09
11.	"Oompa Veruca"	1:39
12.	"Wonkmobile"	1:14
13.	"Oompa TV"	1:42
14.	"Farewell Wonkites"	4:58
Total length:		40:22

== Deluxe Edition ==
In early 2015, Primus' official website announced Primus and the Chocolate Factory with the Fungi Ensemble Deluxe Edition to be released on April 28, 2015. This update reformats the album into Dolby 5.1 Surround Sound, and also includes a bonus live CD that features Primus' signature extended live jams. This was nominated for the Grammy Award for Best Immersive Audio Album.

Shortly after the last live performance of the album, it was announced on Primus' official website that the Deluxe Edition's release date had been delayed until November 20, 2015, and that pre-orders will now include a limited edition box of chocolates. The live CD was replaced with a DVD of custom visuals for each song.

== Personnel ==
Primus

- Les Claypool – lead vocals (tracks 2–4, 6–9, 11–13), upright bass (1, 2, 7–11, 13, 14), cello (1, 2, 4, 7, 9, 11, 13, 14), bass guitar (3, 4, 6, 10, 12), marimba (1, 8, 14), backing vocals (10), percussion (12)
- Larry LaLonde – guitar (tracks 1–11, 13, 14), lead vocals (10)
- Tim "Herb" Alexander – drums (tracks 1–4, 6–11, 13, 14)

The Fungi Ensemble

- Mike Dillon – vibraphone (tracks 2, 4, 6, 7, 9, 10, 13), marimba (2, 4, 10), tablas (3)
- Sam Bass – cello (tracks 3, 6, 8, 10)

== Charts ==
Chart (2014)	Peak position
Australian Albums (ARIA)	116
Belgian Albums (Ultratop Flanders)	148
US Billboard 200	17
US Digital Albums (Billboard)	24
US Independent Albums (Billboard)	2
US Top Alternative Albums (Billboard)	2
US Top Rock Albums (Billboard)	4
