= Les Claypool's Fancy Band =

Musicians on tour with Les Claypool (2005–2008)

- Origin: Northern California
- Genre: Alternative rock
- Years active: 2005–2008
- Label: Prawn Song
- Past members: Les Claypool; Skerik; Mike Dillon; Paulo Baldi; Jay Lane; Gabby La La
- Website: lesclaypool.com

Les Claypool's Fancy Band was a lineup of musicians on tour with Les Claypool from 2005 to 2007. The band consisted of Claypool on bass, Skerik on tenor and baritone saxophone, Mike Dillon on vibraphone, marimba, tabla, cuíca and percussion, Gabby La La on sitar, ukulele and theremin and Paulo Baldi on drums. The Fancy Band's first appearance was 2005. They toured nationally in 2006 promoting the album Of Whales and Woe. They toured the early summer of 2007 with the release of the DVD Fancy.

A variation of the Fancy Band is the "Fancy Trio" including Claypool, Skerik and Dillon.

Much like with his Frog Brigade, Claypool's Fancy Band performed a variety of songs from his various side projects. They did not usually play Primus songs apart from an occasional riff teaser.

== Discography ==
- Fancy - DVD - live performance
