= Cheesy Home Video =

Video by Primus
- Released: May 12, 1992
- Length: 30 minutes
- Label: Atlantic

Primus video chronology
Cheesy Home Video (1992)	Videoplasty (1998)

Cheesy Home Video is the first home video from Primus, released in 1992 on VHS in conjunction with the band's first covers EP Miscellaneous Debris. The video includes three music videos interspersed with live footage filmed in the United States and Europe from the Roll the Bones tour, and interviews with the band at home and on Les Claypool's boat, hosted by Bob Cock.

In 2003, Cheesy Home Video was included on the Animals Should Not Try to Act Like People DVD, albeit edited down to exclude the music videos as they were already featured separately on the disc.

== Track listing ==
1. Home Video Footage
2. "John the Fisherman" - Directed by Mark Kohr
3. Home Video Footage
4. "Jerry Was a Race Car Driver" - Directed by Mark Kohr
5. Home Video Footage
6. "Tommy the Cat" - Directed by Mark Kohr
7. Home Video Footage / Credits

== Personnel ==
- Les Claypool - bass, vocals
- Larry LaLonde - guitar
- Tim Alexander - drums

== Critical reception ==
Professional ratings
Review scores
Source	Rating
Allmusic	3/5 stars

In his review for Allmusic, Greg Prato describes the video as "a brief yet wacky guided tour into the strange world of Primus." He contends that "it is a highly recommended vid," but also concludes that Cheesy Home Video could have been even better if full-length live songs were included."
