= Hallucino-Genetics =

Video by Primus
- Released: November 16, 2004
- Recorded: June 26, 2004,
- Venue: Aragon Ballroom in Chicago, Illinois
- Length: 2 hours 31 minutes
- Label: Prawn Song

Primus video chronology
Animals Should Not Try To Act Like People (2003)	Hallucino-Genetics (2004)	Blame It on the Fish (2006)

Hallucino-Genetics: Live 2004 is the first concert DVD from Primus, released in October 2004. The show was filmed on June 26, 2004 at the Aragon Ballroom in Chicago, Illinois, the band's last show of their 2004 tour. The performance features the original recording lineup of the band performing two sets; the second set features the band playing their first studio album (Frizzle Fry) in its entirety.

== Track listing ==
All music is composed by Primus; all lyrics by Les Claypool.

Set one
No.	Title	Original album	Length
1.	"Sgt. Baker"	Sailing the Seas of Cheese	4:58
2.	"American Life"	Sailing the Seas of Cheese	9:53
3.	"My Friend Fats"	Animals Should Not Try to Act Like People	11:07
4.	"Jerry Was a Race Car Driver"	Sailing the Seas of Cheese	3:28
5.	"The Last Superpower aka Rapscallion"	Animals Should Not Try to Act Like People	12:20
6.	"My Name Is Mud"	Pork Soda	5:45
7.	"Southbound Pachyderm"	Tales from the Punchbowl	10:19

Set two – Frizzle Fry
No.	Title	Length
8.	"To Defy the Laws of Tradition"	6:54
9.	"Groundhog's Day"	8:07
10.	"Too Many Puppies"	7:21
11.	"Mr. Knowitall"	5:39
12.	"Frizzle Fry"	6:09
13.	"John the Fisherman"	3:59
14.	"You Can't Kill Michael Malloy"	2:50
15.	"The Toys Go Winding Down"	8:30
16.	"Pudding Time"	4:52
17.	"Sathington Willoughby"	2:16
18.	"Drum and Whamola Jam"	10:17
19.	"Spegetti Western"	6:22
20.	"Harold of the Rocks"	9:16
21.	"To Defy"	2:31

Encore
No.	Title	Original album	Length
22.	"The Pressman"	Suck on This/Pork Soda	8:31

== Personnel ==
Primus

- Les Claypool – bass, upright bass, vocals
- Larry LaLonde – guitar
- Tim Alexander – drums

Production

- Zoltron – producer
- David Lefkowitz – management
- Jesse Rice – project coordinator

Media

- Zoltron – interface and packaging design
- Adam Gates – interface design & live projections
- Derek Featherstone – 2 track live mix (assisted by Scott Harvey), 5.1 surround mix (with Bob Edwards)
- Dan Hayes – video editing
- Brian Myers – video shoot producer, director
- Kurt Branstetter – director of photography, camera operator
- Carla Freestep – photographs
- Rich Winter – encoding, authoring

== Critical reception ==
Professional ratings
Review scores
Source	Rating
Allmusic	4/5 stars

In his review for Allmusic, Greg Prato notes that "despite a lengthy absence from the concert trail, Primus is as wild 'n' wacky as ever, and not afraid to veer off into an extended jam on a moment's notice." He contends that "the Frizzle Fry portion certainly doesn't disappoint", elaborating that "while sonically the set is top-notch, the camera work could have been better... few front shots of drummer Alexander are included, so there is no clear view of what he's playing most of the time", but concludes that "these complaints are small; Hallucino-Genetics Live 2004 is a faithful representation of the group's reunion tour."

== Certifications ==
Region	Certification	Certified units/sales
Canada (Music Canada)	Gold	5,000^{^}
United States (RIAA)	Gold	50,000^{^}
^{^} Shipments figures based on certification alone.
