= The Desaturating Seven =

Studio album by Primus
- Released: September 29, 2017
- Recorded: Rancho Relaxo, CA
- Genre: Progressive rock
- Length: 34:38
- Label: ATO, Prawn Song
- Producer: Les Claypool

Primus chronology
Primus & the Chocolate Factory with the Fungi Ensemble (2014)	The Desaturating Seven (2017)	Conspiranoid (2022)

The Desaturating Seven is the ninth studio album by American rock group Primus, released on September 29, 2017. It is the band's first album of original material since 2011's Green Naugahyde, and is the only LP featuring original material written with drummer Tim Alexander since 1995's Tales from the Punchbowl. It was also his final album with the band.

== Background and composition ==
The Desaturating Seven is a concept album based on the 1978 children's book The Rainbow Goblins, by Ul de Rico. Band leader Les Claypool used to read the book to his children when they were younger; the bassist was fascinated and inspired by the book's vibrant artwork and use of colors. Claypool always felt the book's story would make a fascinating musical project, and eventually approached his fellow band members about recording original music based on the story of the book. This is the second Primus album based on a movie or book, the first being the 2014 album, Primus & the Chocolate Factory with the Fungi Ensemble, and is their shortest full-length album to date.

The album has been noted as a stylistic change for Primus, exploring more traditional aspects of progressive rock than their previous releases. The influence of King Crimson, especially the album Discipline (1981), is evident.

=== Plot synopsis ===
The album tells a story of a land terrorized by seven goblins - named after the seven colors of the rainbow - who feed on color and continue to consume all rainbows they can find; the only place safe from them is The Valley of the Rainbow ("The Valley", "The Seven"). The goblins set out to feast on the remaining rainbows in the valley ("The Trek"), but the promise of the prey turns them against one another ("The Scheme") and drives them gradually insane ("The Dream"). Arriving to The Valley, they try to capture the rainbows, but the colors evade them, and a sudden rainstorm washes them all away ("The Storm", "The Ends?").

== Critical reception ==
Professional ratings
Aggregate scores
Source	Rating
Metacritic	68/100
Review scores
Source	Rating
AllMusic	3/5 stars
The A.V. Club	B
Consequence of Sound	C+
Exclaim!	7/10
PopMatters	8/10

The Desaturating Seven garnered generally positive reviews. The album received an average score of 68/100 from 9 reviews on Metacritic, indicating "generally favorable reviews". AllMusic's Neil Z. Yeung said that the album is "typically eccentric, it's an interesting exercise, although nonessential outside the sphere of Primus/Claypool devotees." Nina Corcoran of The A.V. Club had a positive impression, noting the album's digestibility and admirable message. Consequence of Sound's Brice Ezell criticizes the album's length, saying that it "errs a bit too much on the side of brevity, resulting in a record that feels like an EP that has overstayed its welcome." Alan Ranta of Exclaim! said that The Desaturating Seven "demonstrate[s] songcraft beyond the great majority of [Primus'] catalogue." PopMatters' Chris Conaton also lamented the album's shortness, but he praised its music, calling it "the tightest, most focused album of Primus' career."

== Track listing ==
All tracks written by Les Claypool.

No.	Title	Length
1.	"The Valley"	4:43
2.	"The Seven"	3:08
3.	"The Trek"	7:50
4.	"The Scheme"	2:50
5.	"The Dream"	6:36
6.	"The Storm"	7:47
7.	"The Ends?"	1:44
Total length:		34:48

== Personnel ==
- Les Claypool – vocals, bass guitar, upright bass
- Larry LaLonde – electric guitar, acoustic guitar
- Tim "Herb" Alexander – drums, percussion
- Justin Chancellor – the goblin master (narration on track 1)

== Charts ==
Chart (2017)	Peak position
Australian Albums (ARIA)	97
Belgian Albums (Ultratop Flanders)	105
Belgian Albums (Ultratop Wallonia)	136
Canadian Albums (Billboard)	59
Scottish Albums (OCC)	65
US Billboard 200	26
US Top Alternative Albums (Billboard)	2
US Top Rock Albums (Billboard)	3
