= Electric Apricot: Quest for Festeroo =

Electric Apricot: Quest For Festeroo
- Poster
- Directed by: Les Claypool
- Written by: Les Claypool
- Produced by: Matthew J. Powers, Jason McHugh
- Starring: Les Claypool
- Cinematography: Matthew J. Powers
- Edited by: Agent Ogden
- Music by: Les Claypool
- Production company: National Lampoon, Inc.
- Distributed by: Troma Entertainment
- Release date: 2007
- Country: U.S.
- Language: English

Electric Apricot: Quest for Festeroo (also known as National Lampoon Presents Electric Apricot: Quest for Festeroo) is a 2007 mockumentary film by Primus lead-man Les Claypool, featuring himself as well as others using pseudonyms. The movie has been screened at film festivals internationally, including the Bonnaroo Music Festival and the Raindance Film Festival in London.

The movie tells the story of a UCLA filmmaker making a music documentary. Claypool himself plays the role of drummer-singer Lapland "Lapdog" Miclovik of rising jam-band Electric Apricot, heading to the holy grail of festivals, Festeroo.

The band Electric Apricot played occasional shows in 2004 and 2005, unannounced, in the California area for footage. The Electric Apricot also made an appearance at the South by Southwest music festival in Austin, Texas, in 2007.

Besides the leads, notable names in the cast include Bob Weir, Mike Gordon, Warren Haynes, Seth Green, Matt Stone, Wavy Gravy, Dian Bachar, Arj Barker, Gabby La La, Sirena Irwin and Sam Maccarone.

The soundtrack album was released on March 18, 2008, while the DVD was released May 13, 2008.

The film's poster art and packaging was designed by Zoltron and Dave Hunter.

== Crew ==
- Director – Les Claypool
- Executive Producer – Matthew J. Powers
- Producer – Jason McHugh
- Associate Producer – Anthony Mindel
- Director of Photography – Matthew J. Powers
- Editor – Agent Ogden

== Cast ==
- Adam Gates as Steve Hampton Trouzdale, a.k.a. Aiwass (bass guitar/vocals)
- Bryan Kehoe as Steven Allan Gordon a.k.a. Gordo (lead guitar/vocals)
- Les Claypool as Lapland Miclovich a.k.a. Lapdog (drums/vocals)
- Jonathan Korty as Herschel Tambor Brillstien (keyboards/vocals)
- Jason McHugh as "Smilin'" Don Kleinfeld
- Kyle McCulloch as Drew Shackleford
- Dian Bachar as Skip Holmes
- Brian Kite as Dr. Brian "Bucky" Lefkowitz
- Oz Fritz as Oswald George
- Arj Barker as the Cube
- Derek Walls as Duck the band technician
- Jason Thompson as Jake the band technician
- Seth Green and Matt Stone as the Taper Guys
- Sirena Irwin as a photographer
- Gabby La La as Mai Pang
- Sam Maccarone as a bartender
- Matthew J. Powers as Davis Mindelhof
- Fred Heim as a police officer
- Chaney, Cage, and Lena Claypool as the coffee shop family
- Slawek Michalak as the Hydroponics salesman
- Betty Biodiesel as Festeroo MC
- Lawrence Brooke as the narrator
- Bob Weir as himself
- Mike Gordon as himself
- Warren Haynes as himself
- Wavy Gravy
- Dian Bachar
- Arj Barker

== Reception ==
Variety's reviewer wrote of the film, "Les Claypool's laid-back mockumentary about a fictional jam band generates enough mild humor to keep the spoof rolling, but lacks the commitment and scope, not to mention the originality, of a This Is Spinal Tap." An Associated Press reviewer wrote that, "the film is even less funny than it is original, even though Claypool has recruited the likes of the Grateful Dead's Bob Weir and Phish's Mike Gordon to instill a bit of street cred."
