= Mushroom Men =

- Developer: Red Fly Studio
- Publishers: Gamecock Media Group (DS); SouthPeak Games (Wii)
- Composer: Les Claypool
- Platforms: Wii (The Spore Wars), Nintendo DS (Rise of the Fungi)
- Release: NA: December 2, 2008; EU: March 27, 2009; AU: May 14, 2009
- Genre: Action Adventure/Platform
- Mode: Multiplayer

The Mushroom Men video games were developed for Nintendo DS and Wii systems. Both games were developed by American company Red Fly Studio and published by Gamecock Media Group and SouthPeak Games. The story revolves around a civil war between 3-inch-high (76 mm) Mushroom Men in a human world. According to the game's designer Mushroom Men: Rise of the Fungi for the Nintendo DS is a side-scrolling platformer as well as a prequel to Mushroom Men: The Spore Wars, the Wii version, which is a full 3D platforming game. Red Fly Studio used Gambitious to try to crowdfund a sequel, known as Pax's Truffle Trouble for PC, which eventually came out on Steam as Mushroom Men: Truffle Trouble on March 10, 2015.

== Story ==
The story begins when a comet crashes into the Earth, raining down a strange green dust in its wake. The space dust is harmless to humans and goes unnoticed, but they failed to notice that flora, fauna and fungi including mushrooms, cacti, and kudzu gained sentience. Also, this strange green dust mutated some of the animals too (such as rabbits, moles, spiders and possums). In order to survive, the newly conscious mushroom people soon formed into tribes, and war inevitably followed. The story of The Spore Wars on Wii also chronicles the life of the main character Pax, a lone bolete mushroom who is trying to find his place in mushroom society. As Pax progresses he discovers a lepiota called Pester that plans to take over the world. Pax follows him to a trailer park where Pax battles him and causes him to fall to the floor below them, leaving Pester to be killed by a mutated fungi dog that devours him. Pax returns to the village and says good bye to the mushroom villagers, saying he'll go where ever the wind takes him.

== Tribes ==
In the August 2007 issue of GamePro, five different tribes of mushrooms were revealed. The names and characteristics of all the tribes correspond to the species of real-world mushrooms for which they are named. The tribes are the Bolete, Morel, Amanita, Lepiota, and Shiitake. A short description of each tribe is below.

- Bolete – These mushrooms are a peaceful, Utopian society, and want nothing more than the entire mushroom world to be at peace. This is the tribe to which the main character, Pax, belongs. They have telekinetic abilities, which they call "Sporekinesis", which most other tribes don't exhibit. They are experts at surprise attacks, and are believed to be the first sentient mushrooms or "alpha" mushrooms.
- Morel – This mushroom tribe consists of intelligent inventors of machines. This tribe is also peaceful and assists Pax. However, they are poor fighters. They are masters of mechanical defense systems.
- Amanita – An evil mushroom tribe who started the mushroom wars in the first game "Mushroom Men: Rise of the Fungi" for the DS platform. They are master fighters, and always attack in groups. Their weapon of choice tends to be scavenged spears. Their leader, the Amanita General managed to grow to a massive size. Whether this is natural or caused by involvement with the meteors is unknown.
- Lepiota – Another evil mushroom tribe, characterized by mystery and dark mysticism. Their cities are shrines and they are very religious. Tough and resourceful, they secure human artifacts and insects to use as weapons, using them in slashing attacks. Pester, their leader, has also exhibited Sporekinesis, although it is unknown if this natural or caused by his tampering with the meteors.
- Shiitake – An order of elemental monks.

== Weapons ==
The game features weapon construction, as the player finds everyday items that can be converted into weaponry. For example, an axe can be made of a corncob holder attached to a popsicle stick or even a Nintendo DS stylus. These weapons fall into four categories: slashing, bashing, thrusting, and radical. Each weapon category has its strengths in combat; for example, a slashing weapon is excellent when being swarmed by a group of enemies, while the thrusting weapons are useful for eliminating hard-to-reach flying enemies.

== Music ==
The theme song for the games and several original tracks were composed and performed by Les Claypool of Primus fame. He contributed original tracks to the game's soundtrack, which is a groundbreaking metronome-based system developed by Gl33k, a music and sound design group located in Austin, Texas. The songs include "Eye of the Mushroom", "Sidescroll my Heart", and "Opposoumly Dangerous". Some of these are featured on Claypool's 2009 solo album, Of Fungi and Foe.

== Reception ==
Reception

Aggregate score
Aggregator	Score	
Aggregator	DS	Wii
Metacritic	45/100	72/100

Review scores
Publication	Score	
Publication	DS	Wii
1Up.com	N/A	C
Destructoid	N/A	7.5/10
Edge	N/A	6/10
Game Informer	N/A	5.75/10
GamePro	2.5/5	N/A
GameSpot	4.5/10	7/10
GameSpy	2/5	3.5/5
GameZone	5.5/10	7.6/10
IGN	5.1/10	7.9/10
Nintendo Power	5/10	8/10
411Mania	5.5/10	7/10

The game received mixed or average reviews for the Wii version, and mixed to negative reviews for the Nintendo DS version. The Spore Wars received "average" reviews, while Rise of the Fungi received "generally unfavorable reviews", according to the review aggregation website Metacritic.
