= Whamola =

Bass musical instrument

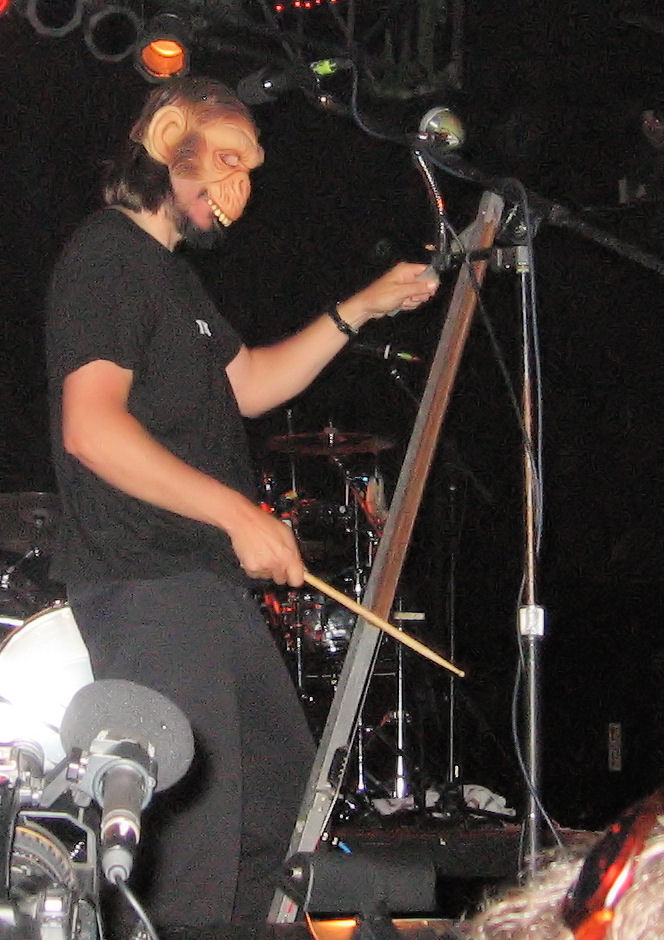
Primus frontman and bassist Les Claypool playing a Whamola

The Whamola is a bass instrument used in funk-jazz styles of music. The name is a portmanteau of whammy bar and viola.

The Whamola is a direct descendant of the washtub bass, an American folk instrument popular with skiffle and jug bands, and features a single string which is manipulated via a pulley-and-lever system. The pulley mechanism is mounted in place of the tuning pegs at the top of a double-bass-style neck, which is attached to a wooden or metal body featuring a bridge, pickup and stand. The Whamola is played by hitting the string with a drum stick and either fretting it against the neck with the other hand or using the lever to alter its tension and change the pitch.

Whamolas are rare, and are usually made by musicians for personal use, as opposed to being manufactured by professional luthiers. However, the instrument has gained mass exposure due to its being played by contemporary bassists like Les Claypool. A song prominently featuring the instrument appears on the Les Claypool Frog Brigade's 2002 album Purple Onion, and a remix of that track is the basis for the opening of several seasons of South Park, beginning with the tenth season. Primus also regularly play a "Drum and Whamola Jam" in concert, as documented by their 2004 live DVD Hallucino-Genetics.
