= South of the Pumphouse =

2006 novella by Les Claypool

- Author: Les Claypool
- Language: English
- Publisher: Akashic Books
- Publication date: 2006
- Dewey Decimal: 813.6
- LC Class: PS3603.L396 S66

South of the Pumphouse is a 2006 novella by rock musician Les Claypool. The book can be described as a tragic tale containing themes of family, racism, drugs, and misconceptions. The book describes the San Francisco and San Pablo Bays, and the fishing areas they have to offer. The novella was published by Akashic Books and is also available on the Amazon Kindle store.

== Plot summary ==
Two brothers get together for a fishing trip in memory of their recently deceased father. But while one, Ed, has left the small town of El Sobrante (the actual town where Claypool grew up) to go live in the town of Berkeley, California, the other, Earl, has stayed in the town and has become a methamphetamine addict. When Earl invites his best friend, Donny, along on a fishing trip things get heated between the left wing Ed and right wing racist Donny. When Earl mistakenly concludes that Donny has slept with his wife, he beats him to death with a boat pole. The rest of the novel is concerned with the brothers' efforts to dispose of Donny's body, a twist in the tale which explains Earl's mistake and a brief epilogue concerning the sturgeon which the three men were trying to catch during their day's fishing.

Claypool fleetingly addresses the themes of racism and urban decay in his novel.
