= Be Careful What You Wish For... =

Studio album by Gabby La La
- Released: June 14, 2005
- Recorded: 2005
- Studio: Rancho Relaxo
- Genre: Experimental
- Length: 42:06
- Label: Prawn Song Records
- Producer: Les Claypool

Gabby La La chronology
Be Careful What You Wish For... (2005)	I Know You Know I Know (2011)

Professional ratings
Review scores
Source	Rating
Allmusic	3.5/5 stars

Be Careful What You Wish For... is the first album by Gabby La La, the multi-instrumentalist on Les Claypool's Prawn Song record label.

The album is written almost like children's music, using themes such as backpacks, elves and pirates. The overall sound seems to pay homage to the sound of an off-key circus calliope. Her range of instruments include a sitar, accordion, toy piano, and ukulele. Les Claypool produces and provides bass, drums and percussion.

== Track listing ==
All tracks are written by Gabby La La, except "In Dreams" written by Roy Orbison.

No.	Title	Length
1.	"Be Careful What You Wish for 'cause It Might Come True"	2:59
2.	"Backpack"	2:31
3.	"Golden Flea"	4:41
4.	"In Dreams" (Roy Orbison)	2:47
5.	"Boogie Woogie Man in a Black Dress"	3:08
6.	"Walkie Walkie Walkie"	2:55
7.	"Butter and Eggs"	4:49
8.	"Twins"	3:29
9.	"In and out of Dreaming"	4:18
10.	"Pirates"	5:04
11.	"Little Fortune Cookie"	3:13
12.	"Elf"	4:12

== Personnel ==
- Gabby La La – sitar, ukulele, accordion, guitar, theremin, toy piano, lead vocals
- Les Claypool – bass guitar, upright bass, drums, percussion

=== Production ===
- Les Claypool – producer, arranger, engineer
- Stephen Marcussen – mastering
- Jesse Rice – project supervisor
- Derek Walls – assistant
- Jay Blakesberg – photographer
