= Conspiranoid =

EP by Primus
- Released: April 22, 2022
- Recorded: 2022
- Genre: Progressive rock
- Length: 19:56
- Label: ATO
- Producer: Les Claypool

Primus chronology
The Desaturating Seven (2017)	Conspiranoid (2022)	The Revenant Juke: A Collection of Fables and Farce (2022)

Singles from Conspiranoid
- 1. "Conspiranoia" Released: April 5, 2022

Conspiranoid is a three-track EP by the American rock band Primus, released on April 22, 2022. Released on vinyl and CD, this EP includes the band's longest song to date "Conspiranoia", clocking in at eleven minutes; it was released as a single on April 5, 2022, alongside a music video created by Cage Claypool, the son of Primus vocalist and bassist Les Claypool. It is also Primus' last release with drummer Tim "Herb" Alexander before leaving the band for the third time in October 2024.

== Background and production ==
Primus frontman Les Claypool revealed the inspiration for the EP in an interview with Consequence, saying that it "sprouted from a seed I had planted in my notebook a year or so ago—a few lines commenting on the mental state of the contemporary world." It was inspired by what Claypool perceived as a growing divide between people, caused by "disinformation, misinformation, warped information, and flat-out fairy tales being perpetuated by anyone with a slight hint of web design aptitude."

Primus had initially intended to make the follow-up to The Desaturating Seven (2017), but were not interested in writing an album's worth of material, due to time constraints. Instead they began writing a single, initially with the idea of creating a "long, winding, bastard of a song", twenty minutes in length. This song became "Conspiranoia", and with a length of eleven and a half minutes, it is the longest song Primus has ever recorded. In addition, the band finished an existing track "Follow the Fool" as well as the newly written "Erin on the Side of Caution", the latter of which was also based on writings from Claypool's notebook.

== Lyrical themes ==
Conspiranoid covers topics and themes related to misinformation and conspiracy theories, serving as a criticism and satire of American far-right conspiracy theories and the culture surrounding them. The track "Conspiranoia" is worded as a cautionary tale and contains lyrical references to chemtrails, QAnon, flat earth, COVID-19 conspiracy theories, Donald Trump, and antisemitic conspiracy theories. The title of the EP is a portmanteau of the words "conspiracy" and "paranoid".

== Track listing ==
All lyrics are written by Les Claypool with additional lyrics on "Conspiranoia" by Cage Claypool

Conspiranoid track listing
No.	Title	Music	Length
1.	"Conspiranoia"	Claypool	11:39
2.	"Follow the Fool"	Claypool	3:45
3.	"Erin on the Side of Caution"	LaLonde	4:32
Total length:			19:56

== Personnel ==
Credits adapted from Tidal and the album's Liner Notes.

Primus

- Les Claypool – vocals, bass, keyboards, production, mixing, painting
- Larry LaLonde – guitar
- Tim "Herb" Alexander – drums & percussion

Additional personnel

- Stephen Marcussen – mastering
- Jason Mills – engineering
- Tim Solyan – studio tech
- Ryan Ohara – studio assistant
