= I Know You Know I Know =

Studio album by Gabby La La
- Released: 2011
- Genre: Electronic
- Label: Independent (Bandcamp)

Gabby La La chronology
Be Careful What You Wish For... (2005)	I Know You Know I Know (2011)

I Know You Know I Know is the second solo studio album by Gabby Lang, better known as Gabby La La.

== Track listing ==
1. Alarm Clock
2. 4 Square
3. The Clique
4. I Know You Know I Know
5. Halloween
6. There Is Space
7. Rainbows
8. The Squirrel
9. Nap Time
10. Whip In
