= Of Whales and Woe =

Studio album by Les Claypool
- Released: May 30, 2006
- Recorded: 2005, 2006
- Genre: Experimental rock, progressive rock
- Length: 39:29
- Label: Prawn Song
- Producer: Les Claypool

Les Claypool chronology
Of Whales and Woe (2006)	Of Fungi and Foe (2009)

Professional ratings
Review scores
Source	Rating
Allmusic	3.5/5 stars
Rolling Stone	2.5/5 stars

Of Whales And Woe is the second solo album by Les Claypool, the bassist and vocalist of Primus. The album was released on May 30, 2006. The album features Skerik (saxophonist of the Les Claypool's Fearless Flying Frog Brigade), Mike Dillon (percussionist, also of the Frog Brigade), and Gabby La La (multi-instrumentalist). "Back off Turkey" also features Les' children, Cage and Lena. The track "Iowan Gal" is a love song for his wife, Chaney Claypool.

== Background ==
Of Whales and Woe marks the first album release under the name Les Claypool. Though previous "solo" efforts were issued under a variety of monikers, these new recordings are the most self-contained to date. On most of the tracks Claypool provides drums and guitar as well as his usual bass and vocals while band members add instrumental variety (Skerik - sax, Mike Dillon - marimba and percussion, Gabby La La - sitar). The CD includes an assortment of musical styles and also includes Les' theme for Seth Green's hit animated show Robot Chicken that airs on Adult Swim.

The song "Phantom Patriot" takes its name from the 2002 incident where Richard McCaslin infiltrated the secretive Bohemian Grove campground in California. He was heavily armed and had the words "Phantom Patriot" written on his outfit.

The live band that toured in support of the album was Les Claypool's Fancy Band.

== Track listing ==
1. "Back Off Turkey" – 2:11
2. "One Better" – 5:59
3. "Lust Stings" – 4:08
4. "Of Whales and Woe" – 3:03
5. "Vernon the Company Man" – 2:32
6. "Phantom Patriot" – 4:01
7. "Iowan Gal" – 3:29
8. "Nothin' Ventured" – 3:08
9. "Rumble of the Diesel" – 4:03
10. "Robot Chicken" – 0:40
11. "Filipino Ray" – 3:51
12. "Off-White Guilt" – 2:21

== iTunes Bonus Track ==
1. "D's Diner (Live)" - 8:05

== Personnel ==
- Les Claypool - bass (1–6, 8–12), vocals, percussion (1, 3, 7, 9, 12), guitar (2–4, 6, 8, 9), drums (2–4, 6, 8, 11), bass banjo (7), whamola (10), keyboards (10), drum machine (10), sound effects (10)
- Cage Claypool - percussion (1)
- Lena Claypool - marimba (1)
- Mike Dillon - marimba (2, 12), vibes (4, 6, 8), tabla (5), percussion (12)
- Skerik - tenor sax (2, 4, 6, 8, 12), baritone sax (3, 12), horn arrangement (12)
- Gabby La La - theremin (4), sitar (5, 11, 12)

== Production ==
- Producer: Les Claypool
- Engineer: Les Claypool
- Mastering: Stephen Marcussen
- Design: Zoltron
- Layout: Zoltron
- Illustrations: Cage Claypool, Lena Claypool
- Project Supervisor: Leanne Lajoie

== Chart performance ==
=== Album ===
Chart	Provider(s)	Peak position	Certification	Sales/ shipments
Billboard 200 (U.S.)	Billboard	115	Not certified	N/A
Billboard Top Heatseekers (U.S.)	Billboard	2	Not certified	N/A
Billboard Independent Albums (U.S.)	Billboard	5	Not certified	N/A
