= Buck Naked and the Bare Bottom Boys =

American rockabilly band

Buck Naked and the Bare Bottom Boys were an American rockabilly band from San Francisco, California.

== History ==
Originally from Omaha, Nebraska, Buck Naked and the Bare Bottom Boys emerged from the San Francisco Bay Area music scene in the mid-1980s. Lead singer/guitarist Phillip Bury (b. 1954), under the stage name "Buck Naked," performed wearing only cowboy boots, a cowboy hat, a guitar, and a strategically placed toilet plunger. Filling out the band were Buck's brother Stephen Bury (performing as "Hector Naked") and David Wees (as "Stinky LePew"). Despite its name, the rest of the band were more or less fully clothed on stage.

The band became friends with Primus. Sharing many aesthetic similarities, the latter would make numerous tributes to Bury, in their videos ("Mr. Krinkle" features a painting, "Wynona's Big Brown Beaver" features a bass drum head), and in the album credits to 1993's Pork Soda.

The band appeared on the Joan Rivers Show in 1991 for a segment on "the most outrageous bands in the world."

The band came to an abrupt end in November 1992 when Phillip Bury was shot and killed while walking his dog in San Francisco's Panhandle by a cab driver named Michael Kagan. Kagan had for many years fed pigeons there. He claimed Bury attacked him with a bicycle lock, and he shot Bury in self-defense. According to witnesses at the trial, Kagan had been known to threaten dogs who chased the pigeons, and, on occasion, their owners. Kagan appealed the case to California's Supreme Court, but his conviction for manslaughter was upheld. He was sentenced to 16 years in prison, the maximum term allowed.

== Discography ==
- Teenage Pussy From Outer Space (EP)
- Buck Naked and the Bare Bottom Boys (1993)

== See also ==
- Naked Cowboy
