= Wynona's Big Brown Beaver =

1995 single by Primus

Single by Primus

from the album Tales from the Punchbowl
- Released: 1995
- Studio: Rancho Relaxo (Sebastopol, California)
- Genre: Alternative rock; blues rock
- Length: 4:24
- Label: Interscope
- Songwriters: Les Claypool; Larry LaLonde; Tim Alexander
- Producer: Primus

Primus singles chronology
"Mr. Krinkle" (1993)	"Wynona's Big Brown Beaver" (1995)	"Mrs. Blaileen" (1996)

"Wynona's Big Brown Beaver" is a song by American rock band Primus, released as the first single from their fourth studio album Tales from the Punchbowl (1995). It was nominated for Best Hard Rock Performance at the 1996 Grammy Awards, which guitarist Larry LaLonde was the only band member to attend.

== Composition ==
Described by Louder as a "a funky, country-fried ho-down about a random woman named Wynona and her relationship with her furry friend", the song's origins were explained by Les Claypool in a 2014 interview with Songfacts: "I was fly fishing with a friend of mine up in Lassen County, the sun was going down and we were heading back to the car. I come around this corner, and I spied this thing, it spied me. It was this big, furry mass coming my way. It flipped and popped its tail and scared the shit out of me, and I scared the shit out of it. It was this giant beaver. I mean, it was huge. So, it kind of got in my head. This big brown beaver. 'Okay. Well, how can I make a song out of that?'"

Claypool later said, "That song was never supposed to be what it became. It was gonna be this goofy little song on the record with some banjo and some upright bass, and it just kind of evolved into the lead track."

== Winona Ryder controversy ==
Some speculated that the song was about actress Winona Ryder, who reportedly confronted Primus about it backstage at HFStival. Claypool contradicted this in a 1997 interview with BAM, stating, "I met Winona Ryder. She had heard from a friend of ours that I'd possibly written a song about her. She's actually really cool. She wasn't pissed really; I think she was just more confused. She wanted to know why we might write a song about her and I told her, 'It has nothing to do with you.' It was really cool. I got to meet a movie star." He also expressed confusion that people never asked him whether the song was about country singer Wynonna Judd, considering the song's country-influenced sound, Judd's habit of being credited mononymously as Wynonna, and the spelling of the titular character's name being closer to her name than Ryder's.

== Music video ==
Claypool directed the music video. It features Primus in full-body latex outfits and masks resembling life-sized animatronic cowboys, giving them an uncanny appearance, as a band called Buck Naked and the Bare Bottom Boys (a reference to the band of the same name with whom Primus are friends). The band is shown performing the song in a barn and partaking in typical Wild West activities such as dueling, playing poker, shooting bottles, and riding "horses" (carousel horses rather than real ones). During the verses, animated sequences depict the events described in the lyrics.

The video was shot using a slowed-down version of the song, with the footage being sped up to match the original song's speed during the editing process to make the band's movements look unnatural. The band's outfits were inspired by The Puttermans, a fictional family of plastic humanoid robots that appeared in a series of Duracell commercials from 1994 to 1996, which were abandoned due to unsettling viewers.

== Legacy ==
In 2020, Voodoo Brewery released a line of ale called Wynona's Big Brown Ale in honor of the song and band.

== Track listing ==
1. "Wynona's Big Brown Beaver" – 4:23
2. "Hello Skinny/Constantinople" – 4:44 (originally by The Residents)
3. "Hellbound 17½ (Theme From)" – 2:59
4. "Have a Cigar" – 5:26 (only available on German edition of the single; originally by Pink Floyd)

== Charts ==
Chart (1995)	Peak position
Australia (ARIA)	80
US Alternative Airplay (Billboard)	12
US Mainstream Rock (Billboard)	23
US Radio Songs (Billboard)	62
