= Purple Onion (album) =

Studio album by The Les Claypool Frog Brigade
- Released: September 24, 2002
- Recorded: 2002
- Genre: Experimental rock
- Length: 56:00
- Label: Prawn Song Records

The Les Claypool Frog Brigade chronology
Live Frogs Set 2 (2001)	Purple Onion (2002)	'Live Frogs Set 1&2' (2019)

Purple Onion is the debut studio album by The Les Claypool Frog Brigade, released on September 24, 2002. It followed two live releases by the band, and is the first release of the Frog Brigade's original compositions. While the Brigade regulars are consistent on much of the record such as Jay Lane, Eenor Wildeboar, Skerik and new percussionist Mike "Tree Frog" Dillon, many special guests appear on the album as well. Guests on multiple tracks include Ben Barnes and Sam Bass (then both from Deadweight). "D's Diner," a tribute to a Sebastopol, California restaurant, features sitar player Gabby La La in addition to the triple-bass onslaught of Claypool, Norwood Fisher (Fishbone) and Lonnie Marshall (Weapon of Choice). Warren Haynes (Allman Brothers Band) adds slide guitar on the "Buzzards of Green Hill" and Fish Fisher (Fishbone drummer) guests on "Whamola." "Whamola" was a live show staple named after the unique instrument Les employs—a one-string bass played with a drumstick. The song later appeared as a remix for the theme of South Park Season 10. "Barrington Hall" is a tribute to the UC Berkeley student housing known in the 1960s-1980s for counterculture. Purple Onion was released on vinyl for the first time on November 24, 2009.

== Reception ==
Professional ratings
Review scores
Source	Rating
AllMusic	3/5 stars
Rolling Stone	3/5 stars

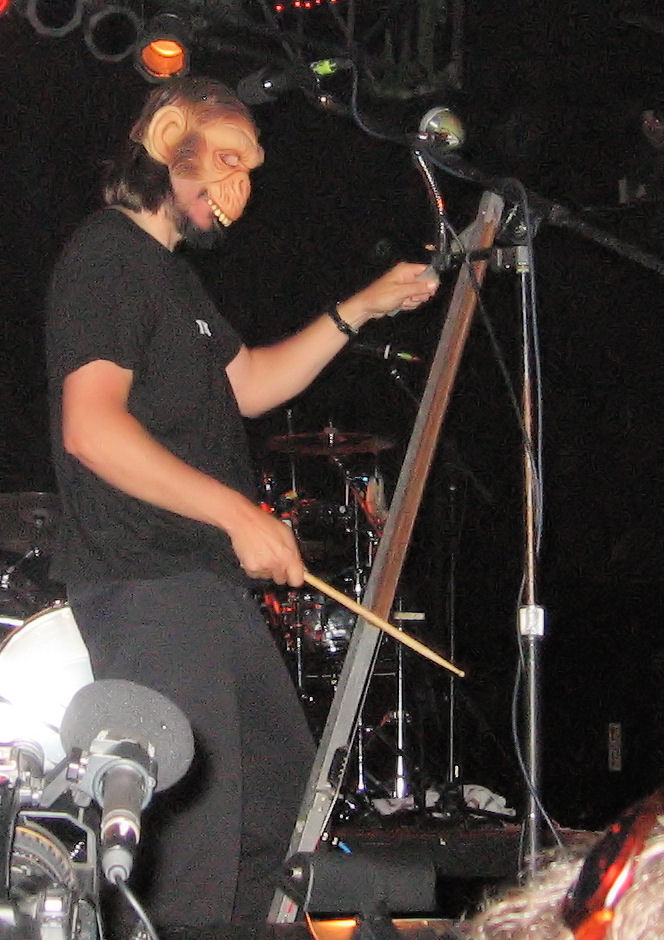
Claypool playing the Whamola

Reception for Purple Onion was positive. The College Music Journal (CMJ) wrote that "Claypool's bass-spanking and carnival barker delivery warp the songs like the inside of a funhouse mirror." Rolling Stone gave the album a rating of three out of five, and stated that the album "Allows the master bass player to give full vent to his weirdness. ... Sure to please hardcore fans." The AllMusic review by Jesse Jarnow awarded the album three stars out of five, and wrote that "The music isn't nearly as edgy or angular as his work with Primus, but that's ultimately okay."

Tom Waits listed it 19th among his favorite albums.

== Track listing ==
All tracks are written by Les Claypool.

No.	Title	Length
1.	"Purple Onion"	1:43
2.	"David Makalaster"	4:41
3.	"Buzzards of Green Hill"	4:06
4.	"Long in the Tooth"	1:51
5.	"Whamola"	5:00
6.	"Ding Dang"	5:50
7.	"Barrington Hall"	4:16
8.	"D's Diner"	5:44
9.	"Lights in the Sky"	4:35
10.	"Up on the Roof"	3:39
11.	"David Makalaster II"	7:25
12.	"Cosmic Highway"	7:14

== Credits ==
Musicians

- Les Claypool - bass (all except 5), vocals, percussion (1, 9), guitar (2), whamola (5), drums (7)
- Jay Lane - drums (2, 6, 10, 12)
- Mike Dillon - vibraphone (2, 5, 9, 12), metal drum (2), percussion (2), tabla baya (3), pandeiro (3), electric bow & arrow (4), metal sounds (4), cuica (5), marimba (7, 10, 11), metal (9), tabla (12)
- Skerik - saxophone (2, 12), "fancy" sax (2, 5, 6, 9–11), baritone sax (3, 4)
- Warren Haynes - guitar (3)
- Eenor Wildeboar - background vocals (3, 6, 9, 10, 12), yaili tambour (3, 8), jaw harp (3) slide guitar (4, 11), guitar (5, 6, 9, 10, 12)
- Fish Fisher - drums (5, 8)
- Ben Barnes - violin (7, 12)
- Sam Bass - viola (7), cello (7, 12)
- Gabby Lang - sitar (8)
- Lonnie Marshall - bass (8)
- Norwood Fisher - bass (8)
- Dean Johnson - drum outro (9), drums (11)

Production

- Les Claypool - producer, engineer
- Paul Haggard - photography
- Stephen Marcussen - mastering
- Jesse Rice - project supervisor
