= Lacquer Head =

Single by Primus

from the album Antipop
- Released: 1999
- Length: 3:56
- Label: Interscope
- Songwriter: Claypool/LaLonde/R Mantia
- Producers: Primus and Fred Durst

Primus singles chronology
"Over the Falls" (1997)	"Lacquer Head" (1999)	"Electric Uncle Sam" (1999)

"Lacquer Head" is the first single from Primus' 1999 album, Antipop. It is about three children, and the harm that comes to them from inhalants. MTV banned the single's music video for drug references and "violent content". The song was produced by Limp Bizkit frontman Fred Durst, who encouraged the band to return to the more aggressive sound of their earlier albums. On December 11, 2020, the song was performed live for the first time in 20 years via the band's online pay-per-view special, "Alive at Pachyderm Station".
