= Prawn Song Records =

- Founded: 1989
- Founder: Les Claypool
- Distributor: The Orchard
- Genre: Pop, rock
- Country of origin: U.S.
- Location: San Francisco, California
- Official website: www.prawnsong.com

Prawn Song Records is an independent record label owned by Les Claypool of Primus. The name and logo are a parody of Led Zeppelin's label Swan Song Records.

Prawn Song is based in San Francisco, California, and distribution is handled by The Orchard in the United States and Cooking Vinyl in Europe.

== History ==
The label was created in 1989 for the initial limited release of the Primus live album Suck On This. The band borrowed $3,000 from Claypool's father to fund the release and pressed 1,000 vinyl copies of the record. They then used the profits from those sales to keep pressing the album, one thousand copies at a time, and signed a distribution deal with Rough Trade Records. The album was later licensed to be reissued by independent record label Caroline Records in 1990, the same label that released the Frizzle Fry album the same year. Primus then signed to Interscope Records, who released the band's third album Sailing the Seas of Cheese in 1991 and all of their subsequent records for the next twenty years.

Prawn Song was resurrected in 1993 as a subsidiary of Interscope (at the time 50% owned by Atlantic Records, the parent company of the original Swan Song label) for the use of Claypool's side projects: Sausage and The Holy Mackerel. At this point, Prawn Song was also made a sister label to the Atlantic imprint Mammoth Records, working together with them to launch the musical projects of many of Claypool's friends and former bandmates, including M.I.R.V. (featuring Mark "Mirv" Haggard), the Charlie Hunter Trio (featuring Jay Lane), Alphabet Soup (also featuring Lane), Porch (featuring Todd Huth), and Laundry (featuring Tim Alexander). During this time, Primus' albums were released in CD and tape formats by Interscope, with double-LP pressings of the albums issued on Prawn Song.

In 1998 and 1999, Primus started utilising the Prawn Song imprint to release the EP Rhinoplasty and the album Antipop, respectively. By 2001, Prawn Song had dropped its association with Mammoth and branched out from Interscope to become a fully independent label, while also co-operating with Interscope for the release of the Primus EP/DVD Animals Should Not Try to Act like People in 2003. The 2006 compilation album They Can't All Be Zingers was released only by Interscope, separate from Prawn Song. Claypool alleged in 2018 that Mammoth severed ties with Prawn Song as a result of their refusal to release an album by his side project Beanpole, which he worked on with Larry LaLonde, Adam Gates and Mark Greenberg among others. The album was later released by Prawn Song and Sean Lennon's imprint, Chimera Music in 2018.

As an independent label, Prawn Song reissued the early, out-of-print, pre-Interscope Primus albums, as well as DVDs of some of their recent live tours. The label also released material from Claypool's more recent side projects Colonel Les Claypool's Fearless Flying Frog Brigade and Colonel Claypool's Bucket of Bernie Brains, his solo albums, and Gabby La La's debut Be Careful What You Wish For..., on which Claypool produces and provides the rhythm section. The Oysterhead album The Grand Pecking Order, however, was released by Elektra Records.

In 2011, Prawn Song partnered with ATO Records for a joint release of the Primus album Green Naugahyde, and together they subsequently released the band's 2014 album Primus & the Chocolate Factory with the Fungi Ensemble, and the Duo de Twang album Four Foot Shack.

== Catalog ==
=== Inception ===
- RED 22 – Primus – Suck on This (1989)

=== As a subsidiary of Interscope Records ===
- INTD-92361 – Sausage – Riddles Are Abound Tonight (1994)
- INTD-90085 – Les Claypool and the Holy Mackerel – Highball with the Devil (1996)
- 490214-2 – Primus – Rhinoplasty (1998)
- INTV-90302 – Primus – Videoplasty (1998)
- 490414-2 – Primus – Antipop (1999)
- 0602498613603 – Primus – Animals Should Not Try to Act like People (2003)

==== As an associate of Mammoth Records ====
- MR0065-2 – M.I.R.V. – Cosmodrome (1994)
- MR0066-2 – Charlie Hunter Trio – Charlie Hunter Trio (1993)
- MR0082-2 – Alphabet Soup – Layin' Low in the Cut (1995)
- MR0094-2 – Porch – Porch (1994)
- MR0098-2 – Laundry – Blacktongue (1994)
- MR0102-2 – Eskimo – The Further Adventures of Der Shrimpkin (1995)

=== As an independent label ===
- PSR-0001-2 – Colonel Les Claypool's Fearless Flying Frog Brigade – Live Frogs Set 1 (2001)
- PSR-0002-2 – Colonel Les Claypool's Fearless Flying Frog Brigade – Live Frogs Set 2 (2001)
- PSR-0003-2 – Primus – Suck On This (reissue, 2002)
- PSR-0004-2 – Primus – Frizzle Fry (reissue, standard release, 2002)
- PSR-0005-2 – The Les Claypool Frog Brigade – Purple Onion (standard release, 2002)
- PSR-0006-2 – Colonel Claypool's Bucket of Bernie Brains – The Big Eyeball in the Sky (2004)
- PSR-0007-2 – Primus – Hallucino-Genetics: Live 2004 (limited release, 2004)
- PSR-0008-2 – Primus – Hallucino-Genetics: Live 2004 (standard release, 2004)
- PSR-0009-2 – Gabby La La – Be Careful What You Wish For... (2005)
- PSR-0010-2 – Les Claypool – 5 Gallons Of Diesel (2005)
- PSR-0011-2 – Les Claypool – Of Whales and Woe (standard release, 2006)
- PSR-0012-9 – Primus – Blame It on the Fish: An Abstract Look at the 2003 Primus Tour de Fromage (2006)
- PSR-0013-9 – Les Claypool – Fancy DVD (2007)
- PSR-0014-2 – Les Claypool – Of Fungi and Foe (standard release, 2009)
- PSR-0015-1 – Les Claypool – Of Fungi and Foe (limited vinyl release, 2009)
- PSR-0016-1 – Primus – Frizzle Fry (reissue, limited vinyl release, 2009)
- PSR-0017-1 – The Les Claypool Frog Brigade – Purple Onion (limited vinyl release, 2009)
- PSR-0018-1 – Les Claypool – Of Whales and Woe (limited vinyl release, 2009)
- PSR-0019-2 – Primus – Green Naugahyde (joint release, 2011)

==== As an associate of ATO Records ====
- ATO0113 – Primus – Green Naugahyde (joint release, 2011)
- ATO0223 – Duo de Twang – Four Foot Shack (2014)
- ATO0250 – Primus – Primus & the Chocolate Factory with the Fungi Ensemble (2014)
- ATO0404 – Primus – The Desaturating Seven (2017)

== See also ==
- List of record labels
