= Colonel Les Claypool's Fearless Flying Frog Brigade =

Musical project

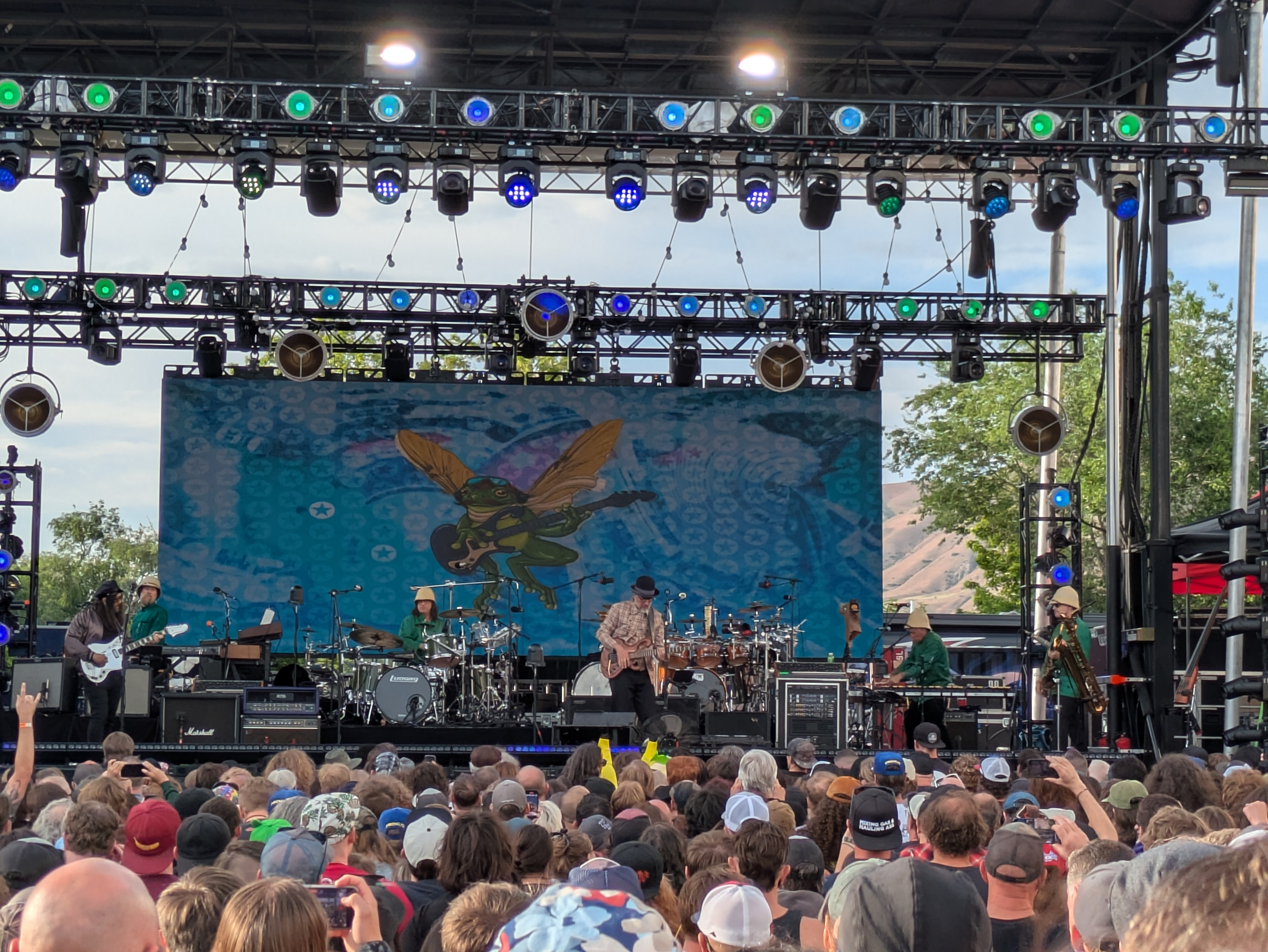
- The band on the Claypool Gold tour in Salt Lake City 2026

Background information
- Origin: San Francisco, California, United States
- Years active: 2000–2004, 2022–present
- Label: Prawn Song

Colonel Les Claypool's Fearless Flying Frog Brigade (also known as The Les Claypool Frog Brigade) is a musical project with rotating personnel, led by American singer/bassist Les Claypool. The Frog Brigade was formed during a hiatus from Claypool's main group Primus.

The original band was formed in summer 2000 and consisted of Claypool, Todd Huth (guitars, vocals), Jay Lane (drums), Jeff Chimenti (keyboards), Skerik (saxophone), and Eenor Wildeboar (guitars, cümbüş). Les Claypool has described their sound as, "It's kind of a King Crimson meets Pink Floyd meets Frank Zappa type thing."

The band released two live recordings in 2001, Live Frogs Set 1 and Live Frogs Set 2. Set 1 is a mix of covers and originals, including "Thela Hun Ginjeet" (King Crimson) and "Shine On You Crazy Diamond" (Pink Floyd). Set 2 is a live cover of the entire Pink Floyd album Animals. A studio album, titled Purple Onion, was also released in 2002.

All three albums were released on Les Claypool's Prawn Song Records.

== History ==
Claypool formed the band to play the Mountain Aire Festival, a jam band festival that takes place in Northern California on Memorial Day weekends each year. Its initial lineup featured MIRV's Marc Haggard on guitar, Skerik on saxophone, and both Jack Irons (ex-Pearl Jam and Red Hot Chili Peppers) and Primus' Tim Alexander on drums. Les had planned on naming the band Les Claypool's Thunder Brigade, but was told by Mountain Aire organizers that the name might sound too heavy for the jam band crowd.

In August 2000, Claypool created a new line-up of the Frog Brigade and took it on a tour that fall. The band consisted of Jay Lane on drums and Todd Huth on guitar, who had worked with Claypool in Sausage (which in itself was a re-formation of the first line up of Primus), guitarist Eenor, who got a place in the band by winning a mail-order competition, Jeff Chimenti, the keyboardist from Ratdog (Jay Lane also has worked with Ratdog), and Skerik continuing on saxophone. This version of the band played a show consisting of two sets – the first filled with covers and songs from Claypool's previous bands, and a second set where the band would play all of the Pink Floyd album Animals.

Reviews noted that although Claypool was turning towards jam band, the cover selections were adventurous and the cross over brought together a unique combination of fans. At the shows it was noted "a peculiar convergence of poncho punks, old Deadheads, extravagant funk fans and year-round Halloween revelers supplied one of the least likely rock audiences in recent memory" including both deadhead 'noodle dancers' and a mosh pit.

After this tour, the Brigade released two live recordings, both taken from the Autumn 2000 concerts by the band in San Francisco. Live Frogs, Vol. 1 contained material from the first, free-form set, and Live Frogs, Vol. 2 was a recording of the band performing Animals.

The Brigade headlined the first SnoCore Icicle Ball in early 2001. The following summer, the band was composed of Claypool, Skerik, Eenor and a new drummer, Paul Svena. Les began writing new material and they began playing single-set live shows. In 2002, Mike Dillon was added as a percussionist and the Frog Brigade recorded their only studio album to date, Purple Onion.

In 2003, Eenor left the band and guitarist Bryan Kehoe joined. Throughout their touring schedule the band has changed drummers multiple times. Drummer Paulo Baldi also entered the rotation in 2003. Baldi, formerly of the Bay Area trio Deadweight, who have disbanded, is a natural fit along the lines of Tim Alexander and Jay Lane.

In 2002, Claypool formed a new band, Colonel Claypool's Bucket of Bernie Brains, with guitarist Buckethead, keyboardist Bernie Worrell, and former Primus drummer Bryan Mantia (aka Brain). This band had much the same genesis as the Frog Brigade; Formed to play at the Bonnaroo Festival of that year, it has since gone on the road, and recordings have become subsequent live albums.

Up until 2023, the Frog Brigade had been on hiatus, and the band has not gone on a major tour since Summer 2003, but has occasionally re-formed to play other one-off shows and music festivals. Claypool toured 2006 and 2007 with Paulo Baldi, Gabby La La, Mike Dillon and Skerik as Les Claypool's Fancy Band.

In 2023, Claypool reformed the band for a tour entitled "Summer of Green," featuring new members Sean Lennon on guitar, and Harry Waters on keyboards, with returning members Paulo Baldi on drums, Mike Dillon on percussion and Skerik on saxophone. Skerik, however was forced to bow out of the tour due to a mysterious shoulder/neck injury.

On May 22, 2026, the reformed band released Return of the Live Frogs: Volume 1 to coincide with the start of the 2026 Claypool Gold tour.

== Members ==
=== Current members ===
- Les Claypool – bass, lead vocals (2000–2003, 2023–present)
- Sean Lennon – guitars, backing vocals (2023–present)
- Harry Waters – keyboards, talkbox (2023–present)
- Paulo Baldi – drums, backing vocals (2003, 2023–present)
- Mike Dillon – percussion, backing vocals (2002–2003, 2023–present)
- Skerik – saxophone (2000–2003, 2023–present)

=== Former members ===
- Marc Haggard – guitars (2000)
- Jack Irons – drums (2000)
- Tim Alexander – drums (2000)
- Todd Huth – guitars, backing vocals (2000–2001)
- Jay Lane – drums (2000–2002)
- Jeff Chimenti – keyboards (2000–2002)
- Eenor Wildeboar – guitars, cümbüş, backing vocals (2000–2003)
- Paul Svena – drums (2002–2003)
- Bryan Kehoe – guitars, backing vocals (2003)

== Discography ==
- 2001: Live Frogs Set 1
- 2001: Live Frogs Set 2
- 2002: Purple Onion
- 2026: Return of the Live Frogs: Volume 1
