= Colonel Claypool's Bucket of Bernie Brains =

American experimental rock supergroup

- Also known as: C2B3
- Genres: Experimental rock; jazz rock
- Years active: 2002–2004
- Label: BMI
- Members: Les Claypool; Buckethead; Brain; Bernie Worrell
- Website: c2b3.com

Colonel Claypool's Bucket of Bernie Brains (C2B3) was an experimental rock supergroup featuring bassist Les Claypool, guitarist Buckethead, keyboardist Bernie Worrell and drummer Brain.

== History ==
Les Claypool, bassist of many bands, including Primus, collaborated with virtuoso guitarist Buckethead, funk keyboardist Bernie Worrell, and former Primus drummer Brain under the name Colonel Claypool's Bucket of Bernie Brains (a combination of all the band members' names), after they met at the 2002 Bonnaroo Music and Arts festival. Worrell, Brain and Buckethead were there to perform with Bill Laswell as Praxis. Laswell was not able to play at the concert, so Claypool invited them to jam with him. From this point, they developed the concept of this supergroup. Their concerts pushed the improvisational envelope by preparing no material and not rehearsing beforehand. At one of their shows they prepared sandwiches onstage for the audience members to eat.

Colonel Claypool's Bucket of Bernie Brains reunited in 2004 to record The Big Eyeball in the Sky, an album with equal parts instrumental and vocal songs. The band began an 18-state tour of the US on September 24, 2004. Claypool said the tour was "a traveling, oversized sock-puppet show spawned by the characters of a Tobe Hooper film and scored by Danny Elfman on bad acid." The album features only one guest, the multi-talented Gabby La La (noted as Gabby Lang on Les Claypool's Frog Brigade's Purple Onion) on vocals and sitar. She also opened on every show during the 2004 tour to mixed reviews as a solo act, sometimes with members of C2B3.

Keyboardist Bernie Worrell died at his home in Everson, Washington, on June 24, 2016.

== Lineup ==
- Les Claypool – vocals, bass
- Buckethead – guitar
- Bernie Worrell – keyboards
- Brain – drums

== Discography ==
Studio album

- 2004: The Big Eyeball in the Sky

2004 Fall Tour

- Downloads at the official site (MP3 or FLAC format)

Compilations

- 2003: Bonnaroo, Vol. 2 – Featuring the live track "Number Two"
- 2004: Concrete Corner: October Sampler 2004 – Featuring the track "Junior"

== Videography ==
- 2005: Les Claypool – 5 Gallons of Diesel

Features the four live tracks: "Opening Jam," "Encore Jam," "Tyranny of the Hunt," and "Scott Taylor."

- 2003: Bonnaroo Music Festival 2002

Features the only live performance of the song "Number Two."
