= M.I.R.V. =

American music band

- Origin: San Francisco, California, United States
- Genres: Experimental; funk
- Years active: 1993–2000s
- Labels: Prawn Song, Poison Eye
- Past members: Marc Haggard; Craig McFarland; David Kobza; Jeff Gomes; Bryan Kehoe; Adam Gates

M.I.R.V. was a band based in the San Francisco, California, Bay Area. The band was founded in 1993. Its musical style includes elements of hard rock, heavy metal, funk, country, opera, experimental, electronica, and polka.

== History ==
Founded in 1993, M.I.R.V initially consisted of the band's namesake guitarist and singer, Marc "Mirv" Haggard, bassist Craig McFarland, and drummer David Kobza. Former Fungo Mungo drummer Jeff Gomes replaced Kobza in 1994. The band recorded Feeding Time on Monkey Island and Dancing Naked in a Mine Field. Guitarist Bryan Kehoe contributed to the vocals and keyboards. Kehoe left the band in 2001 to form The Kehoe Nation, and was replaced by Spent Poets singer Adam Gates, aka "The Filthy Ape". The band played shows as a 5-piece band with both Kehoe and Gates. Gates formed Madame Blavatsky Overdrive with McFarland and Gomes and recorded the Debut album Idiot Jones will Have His Day with engineer Craig McFarland.

Kehoe-era M.I.R.V. shows often featured songs punctuated by interludes of lunacy, usually featuring a verbal interchange between Haggard and Kehoe. Often Haggard would announce a contest for the women in the audience, after which the winner would be cajoled into grabbing Kehoe's groin, causing him to sing in a high-pitched operatic voice. Kehoe would often sing the Neapolitan standard "''O sole mio" following the antics. M.I.R.V. shows would regularly feature Haggard playing an electric saw during portions of the concerts.

M.I.R.V.'s first album, Cosmodrome, was written and recorded by Haggard and featured a character named Granddad, later revealed to be Primus' Les Claypool, who also put the record out on his own Prawn Song label. The album features songs interspersed with skits and is generally regarded as a concept album. The next two records were released on Poison Eye, M.I.R.V.'s own label, and primarily feature music. These latter two albums saw the band form into a four-piece touring outfit, as opposed to a studio project.

The band toured worldwide alongside acts including Jerry Cantrell, Fishbone, Primus, and NOFX and played with groups such as Cheap Trick, Run DMC, Papa Roach and Nuclear Rabbit.

In 2014, both Mirv and guitarist Bryan Kehoe played several gigs with Les Claypool across the U.S.

The band played sporadic shows in the second half of the 2010s. Although the group never announced an official disbandment it has been inactive during the 2020s.

== Cultural references ==
The band's song, "Monkey Boy", was featured in a commercial for the game Fighting Vipers on the Sega Saturn.

M.I.R.V.'s song "Shave My Face Off" was featured in the sixth season of MTV's Beavis & Butt-head on March 7, 1996, after changing the channel from another that showed Hum's song "Stars". Neither Beavis or Butthead showed approval or disapproval of the video, but their discussion mainly centered on the protagonist's ownership of a television, a recliner and some beer.

== Discography ==
- Cosmodrome (1993)
- Feeding Time on Monkey Island (1997)
- Dancing Naked in a Minefield (1999) (artwork by Zoltron)
- Million Pound Bomb (Recorded in 2006, unreleased)
