= Paulo Baldi =

American drummer and percussionist

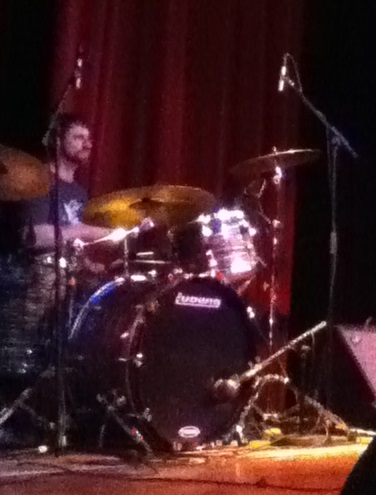
- Baldi performing in 2012

Background information
- Origin: Grand Junction, Colorado
- Genres: Alternative
- Instruments: Drums, Percussion
- Years active: 1996–present
- Member of: The Claypool Lennon Delirium
- Formerly of: Cake; Les Claypool's Fancy Band; Deadweight
- Website: Official website

Paulo Baldi is an American drummer and percussionist best known as a former member of the band CAKE. Baldi currently plays with The Claypool Lennon Delirium consisting of Sean Lennon and Primus' Les Claypool. Other bands Baldi has worked with include Les Claypool's Fancy Band, Deadweight, The Faraway Brothers, The Eric McFadden Trio and world music artist Ali Khan.

== CAKE ==
In 2004, Baldi drummed on two songs for the alternative rock band Cake, "No Phone" and "Carbon Monoxide," both of which appeared on the band's fifth studio album, Pressure Chief. Baldi formally joined shortly after and drummed on their B-Sides and Rarities album as well as 2011's Showroom of Compassion. Baldi left the band in Fall 2015.

== Equipment ==
Baldi endorses Ludwig drums, Evans drumheads, Istanbul Agop cymbals, and Promark drumsticks.

== Selected discography ==
- The Claypool Lennon Delirium – Lime and Limpid Green (2017)
- Cake – Showroom of Compassion (2011)
- Eric McFadden Trio – Delicate Thing (2008)
- Les Claypool's Fancy Band – Fancy (DVD 2007)
- Eric McFadden Trio – Joy of Suffering (2005)
- Cake – Pressure Chief (2004)
- Deadweight – Stroking the Moon (2003)
- Alien Lovestock – Planet of the Fish (2001
- Lumin – Hadra (2001)
- Deadweight – Half Wit Anthems (2000)
- Ali Kahn – Taswir (1999)
- EM Experience – Our Revels Now Are Ended (1999)
- Faraway Brothers – Start the Engine... (1999)
- Liar – Gone Too Far (1998)
- Alien Lovestock – We Are Prepared To Offer You (1997)
- Liar – Devil Dog Road (1995)
