= Deadweight (band) =

American alternative rock band (1994–2005)

- Origin: San Francisco, California
- Genre: Alternative rock
- Years active: 1994–2005
- Past members: Ben Barnes - electric violin and vocals Sam Bass - electric cello Paulo Baldi - drums

Deadweight was an alternative rock trio from San Francisco, California. Members included Ben Barnes (electric violin and vocals), Sam Bass (electric cello) and Paulo Baldi (drums). Deadweight began as a duo of Barnes and Bass, who were graduates of San Francisco Conservatory of Music, later joined by Baldi.

Their first demo (1994) was produced by Jason Newsted of Metallica. Deadweight has toured both nationally and internationally and has opened for Les Claypool's Fearless Flying Frog Brigade. Deadweight's third album, Stroking the Moon (2003), was released on Jello Biafra's Alternative Tentacles label. Playing the violin and cello through a variety of guitar effects, their studio recorded material is hard rock. Live performances display an eclecticism that has conjured a variety of descriptions by critics. Examples include, "(howling) like something out of Beethoven's most twisted hallucinations," "Eastern European Gypsy songs sung in the back of a big rig driven across tornado country by the ghost of the Marlboro Man" and "Charlie Daniels in hell playing a combination of Bartok and Zeppelin." Barnes has stated both Jimmy Page and Charlie Daniels are influences for their sound. Deadweight were winners of the SF Weekly's 1998 Wammy award for the category of "Beyond."

== Discography ==
- Opus 1 (1997)
- Half-Wit Anthems (1999)
- Stroking the Moon (2003)
