= Les Claypool =

American musician (born 1963)

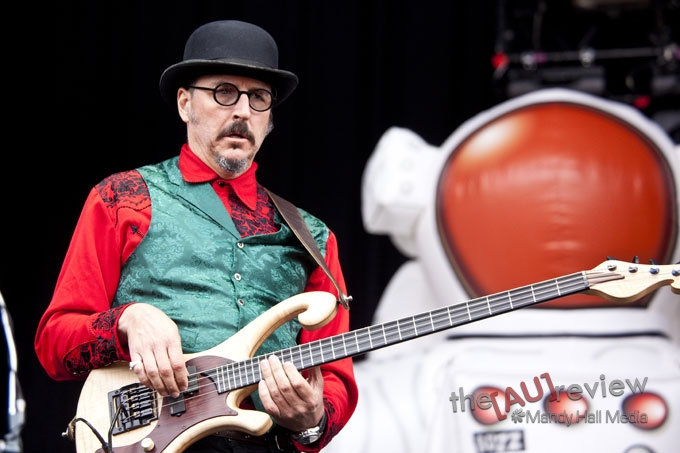
- Claypool performing in March 2011

Background information
- Also known as: Colonel Claypool
- Born: Leslie Edward Claypool; September 29, 1963 (age 63); Richmond, California, U.S.
- Origin: El Sobrante, California, U.S.
- Genres: Alternative metal; funk metal; funk rock; progressive rock; experimental rock; thrash metal
- Occupations: Musician; songwriter; singer; author; filmmaker; winemaker
- Instruments: Bass guitar; vocals; double bass; whamola; drums; keyboards
- Years active: 1984–present
- Member of: Primus; Colonel Les Claypool's Fearless Flying Frog Brigade; Duo de Twang; The Claypool Lennon Delirium
- Formerly of: Blind Illusion; Sausage; Colonel Claypool's Bucket of Bernie Brains; Oysterhead; Les Claypool's Fancy Band
- Spouse: Chaney Smith (m. 1995)
- Website: lesclaypool.com

Leslie Edward Claypool (born September 29, 1963) is an American musician, singer, songwriter, filmmaker, author, and winemaker, best known as the founder, lead singer, bassist, and primary songwriter of Primus. Ranked as one of the greatest bassists of all time by Rolling Stone, his unique playing style mixes tapping, flamenco-like strumming, whammy bar bends, and slapping and popping.

Claypool has been involved in a number of non-Primus projects, including supergroups such as Oysterhead (with Trey Anastasio and Stewart Copeland) and Colonel Claypool's Bucket of Bernie Brains (with Buckethead, Bryan Mantia, and Bernie Worrell) and duos such as Duo de Twang (with Bryan Kehoe) and The Claypool Lennon Delirium (with Sean Lennon). He also fronts the experimental rock projects Colonel Les Claypool's Fearless Flying Frog Brigade and Les Claypool's Fancy Band. He has produced and engineered several of his own releases from Rancho Relaxo, which is his studio in California.

Claypool appears in the opening titles of the animated comedy series South Park, for which Primus has performed the theme song since its debut in 1997. In 2006, he made his debut as both a filmmaker and author when he wrote and directed the mockumentary Electric Apricot: Quest For Festeroo and released the novel South of the Pumphouse.

== Early life ==
Leslie Edward Claypool was born into a working-class family of car mechanics in Richmond, California, on September 29, 1963. He was raised in El Sobrante, California. He learned to play the bass guitar at age 14, but did not begin a career in music until much later. He attended De Anza High School in Richmond, where he was friends with Kirk Hammett, and worked as a carpenter for several years after graduating from high school.

== Career ==
=== Early career ===
After the death of Metallica bassist Cliff Burton in 1986, Metallica guitarist Kirk Hammett reconnected with his high school friend Claypool and asked him to audition as Burton's replacement. In Metallica's episode of the documentary series Behind the Music, Claypool said that he jokingly asked the members of Metallica if they wanted to "jam on some Isley Brothers tunes" during the audition, a reference to his lack of experience with Metallica's thrash metal style. He later recalled Hammett giving him a copy of Metallica's 1984 album Ride the Lightning, which he enjoyed, but also stressed he "wasn't a big metal guy" and did not realize how popular Metallica had become until he arrived at the audition. He also did not realize at the time that the intro riff of "For Whom the Bell Tolls" was performed on bass, and thus did not play it during the audition. Metallica frontman James Hetfield said that Claypool was not offered the job because "he was too good" and "should do his own thing". Claypool responded by admitting that he "wasn't the right guy" for the band due to being a self-proclaimed "weirdo" and said that Hetfield was just "being nice" with his comments.

=== Primus ===
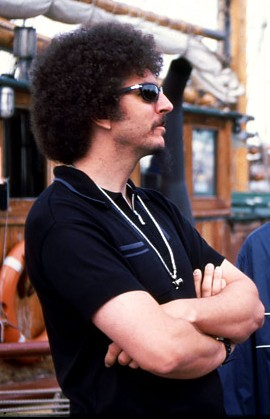
Claypool in 1998

Primus began as "Primate" in the mid-1980s. The band featured Claypool on bass, Todd Huth on guitar, and various drummers (most notably Jay Lane); however, Huth and Lane left shortly thereafter to pursue other projects. Claypool replaced them with guitarist Larry LaLonde and drummer Tim Alexander.

Claypool is considered to be the leader of the band, as well as the driving force behind its blending of funk with other genres. He frequently utilizes the slap-bass technique prominent in funk music, and is the only member of Primus who comes from a funk background. However, Claypool often rejects the "slap bass" label commonly applied to his style, preferring instead the phrase "thumpin' and pluckin'", a term he borrowed from funk bassist Larry Graham. Because of Claypool's strong funk influence, Primus is often described as "thrash-funk" or funk metal, although Claypool dislikes the labels. He said, "We've been lumped in with the funk metal thing just about everywhere. I guess people just have to categorize you”.

From 1989 to 2000, Primus gained significant mainstream airplay, headlining Lollapalooza in 1993 and appearing on Late Show with David Letterman and Late Night with Conan O'Brien in 1995. They also appeared at Woodstock '94, where they performed their Pork Soda hit "My Name Is Mud" and were pelted with mud by the audience, much to the band's displeasure. It drove Claypool to stop playing telling the audience "the song's called My Name is Mud, but keep the mud to yourself you son of a bitch". In 1991, the band was featured in the movie Bill & Ted's Bogus Journey performing their song "Tommy the Cat" live. Claypool and Tom Waits first recorded on each other's records in 1991 and have continued to do so since. In 1997, Primus was asked to play and record the theme song for the animated television show South Park. In 1999, Claypool allowed Activision's use of the song "Jerry Was a Race Car Driver" in the popular video game Tony Hawk's Pro Skater. Primus went on hiatus in 2000.

In mid-2003, Claypool reunited with former Primus drummer Tim Alexander and guitarist Larry LaLonde to record a DVD/EP called Animals Should Not Try to Act Like People. In October of the same year, the band embarked on a two-month tour in which two sets were performed per show, the second set consisting of their 1991 release Sailing the Seas of Cheese being performed in its entirety. Primus continued touring into 2004, performing their 1990 release Frizzle Fry as their second set, as documented on the DVD Hallucino-Genetics: Live 2004.

On October 17, 2006, Primus released both their first greatest hits album, They Can't All Be Zingers, and their third DVD, Blame It on the Fish, subtitled An Abstract Look at the 2003 Primus Tour De Fromage. The band toured in 2006 on their Primus: The Beat a Dead Horse Tour 2006, and played at a small number of festivals in 2008. In 2010, Alexander, who had left the band for the second time due to lack of interest, was replaced by Jay Lane, who had not played with the band since 1988. The band resumed touring after the free June 2010 Rehearsal was released later that year, and a studio album, Green Naugahyde, was released in 2011.

In 2013, Lane left Primus for the second time to focus on his other band RatDog, who were coming off hiatus at the time, and was replaced again by Alexander. Primus' eighth studio album, Primus & the Chocolate Factory with the Fungi Ensemble, a re-imagining of the soundtrack from the 1971 film Willy Wonka & the Chocolate Factory, was released in October 2014.

In 2017, Primus released The Desaturating Seven, an album that is based on a bedtime story published by Italian author Ul de Rico, which is about a group of rainbow eating goblins. They then started a tour with Mastodon through most of 2018.

In 2024, Alexander resigned from Primus "effective immediately," seemingly retiring from music due to a "lost passion to play." The band announced plans to continue touring with members from Claypool's other bands and began searching for "the world's best drummer" to replace Alexander on X (formerly Twitter).

=== Solo work ===
==== Sausage ====
In 1993 Claypool began a short-lived alternative/funk rock band featuring Todd Huth on guitar and Jay Lane on drums. The group released their first album in April 1994 "Riddles Are Abound Tonight" by Prawn Song Records, and did a few short tours and opened for groups such as Helmet, Rollins Band, and Slayer. The band reunited for a show on December 31, 2019, opening for The Claypool Lennon Delirium and have not returned since.

==== Holy Mackerel ====
In 1996, Claypool produced, engineered, and released a solo album, "Les Claypool and the Holy Mackerel presents" Highball with the Devil. He is credited with playing bass, and drums as well as vocals on several tracks as well as guitar. Also on the album are Mark "Mirv" Haggard, Adam Gates, Jay Lane, Joe Gore, Charlie Hunter, and Henry Rollins. The accompanying tour included Haggard and Gates on guitars with Bryan Mantia on drums. It was announced during the Holy Mackerel tour that Mantia had been chosen to become the next Primus drummer.

==== Oysterhead ====
In April 2000, Claypool collaborated with Trey Anastasio (of Phish) and Stewart Copeland (of the Police) to form a supergroup called Oysterhead. Claypool and Anastasio had been looking for an opportunity to collaborate. Each had a mutual interest in playing with Copeland who had been a rock idol of their teen years. Plus, Claypool and Copeland already had an established friendship. Oysterhead were originally intended as a one time performance during Jazz Fest in New Orleans. Though timid of the band's sudden and surprising popularity they decided to record and tour. They released one studio album, The Grand Pecking Order, and toured before disbanding in 2001. They re-united in 2006, at the Bonnaroo Music Festival. In 2016 Les tried to reunite the group, but ended up releasing an album with The Claypool Lennon Delirium. They re-united once again in 2020 for two shows at the 1stBank Center in Broomfield, Colorado, with the rest of their tour cut short by the COVID-19 pandemic.

==== The Frog Brigade ====
In May 2000, Claypool formed Les Claypool's Fearless Flying Frog Brigade, an experimental rock group. He was asked to put together a band for the Mountain Aire Festival in Angels Camp, California. The band "of the most incredible guys (he) could possibly find" debuted that Memorial Day weekend and played a number of other festivals including moe.down. Originally he was going to call the band "Les Claypool's Thunder Brigade". Claypool said:

I originally was going to do the two drummer thing with Herb and Jack Irons, so I was gonna call it the Les Claypool Thunder Brigade. Michael Bailey from Bill Graham Presents said to me that it may sound a bit too heavy for the Mountain Aire crowd and to perhaps try something a little different that had to do with the event itself. Since it was home of the Calaveras County Frog Jump... hence the Frog Brigade and then it evolved into Colonel Les Claypool's Fearless Flying Frog Brigade.

The Primus hiatus allowed him to return to his musical roots, playing songs by bands such as Pink Floyd, King Crimson, and the Beatles. Claypool has called the Frog Brigade his "mid-life crisis band". From a set of October shows recorded at Great American Music Hall in San Francisco, Claypool released two Frog Brigade live albums, one being a cover of Pink Floyd's Animals. The line-up included Todd Huth, Eenor, Jeff Chimenti, Jay Lane, Skerik and Claypool.

The Frog Brigade is also noted for Claypool's being accepted into the jam band scene. Live Frogs Set 1 won "Best Live Album" at the second annual Jammys. Jay Lane and Jeff Chimenti are both members of Bob Weir's bands Ratdog and Wolf Bros. Claypool performed with the Rat Brigade when opening for Ratdog once in 2000 and again in 2007. The Rat Brigade includes Claypool, drummer Lane and keyboardist Chimenti, with guest appearances by saxophonist Kenny Brooks and Bob Weir. Claypool also guested on the Ratdog sets in 2000, 2006 and 2009.

In 2002, Claypool released a studio album of the Frog Brigade, Purple Onion. Musicians on multiple tracks for Purple Onion include Warren Haynes (Gov't Mule) Eenor, Mike Dillon, Skerik, Jay Lane, Ben Barnes, and Sam Bass (Dillon and Skerik were both from Critters Buggin; Barnes and Sam Bass were from Deadweight). The album includes "Whamola" which later appeared as a remix for the theme of South Park Season 10.

==== C2B3 ====
Also in 2002, Claypool collaborated with guitarist Buckethead, Parliament-Funkadelic/Talking Heads keyboardist Bernie Worrell, and former Primus drummer Bryan Mantia under the name Colonel Claypool's Bucket of Bernie Brains (stylized "C2B3," which is pronounced as "C Squared, B Cubed"). Their concerts pushed the improvisational envelope by preparing no material and not rehearsing beforehand. At one of their shows they prepared sandwiches onstage for the audience to eat.

C2B3 re-united in 2004 to record The Big Eyeball in the Sky, an album with equal parts instrumental and vocal songs. The band began an 18-state tour of the US on September 24, 2004. Aux TV was dismissive of Claypool's effort, but when the tour arrived in Northern California where Claypool lives the local press gave a very positive review.

The album features only one guest, the childlike multi-instrumentalist Gabby La La (noted as Gabby Lang on Les Claypool's Frog Brigade's Purple Onion) on vocals and sitar. She also opened on every show (sometimes to scathingly negative reviews) during the 2004 tour as a solo act, and sometimes with members of C2B3. Claypool also produced and performed on Gabby La La's first album, Be Careful What You Wish For.... Gabby La La is the first artist Les has signed to his label since Charlie Hunter in 1993. He has performed select shows with her (including the 2005 Bonnaroo Music Festival) and added her to his then new touring band, Les Claypool & His Fancy Band. The 2005 Fancy Band line-up also included Skerik, Dillon and Lane.

At the end of 2005, Claypool released 5 Gallons of Diesel, a video retrospective of all of his work away from Primus.

==== 2006 ====
===== Of Whales and Woe and the Fancy Band =====
On May 30, 2006, Claypool released a solo album, Of Whales and Woe, with guest appearances by Skerik, Mike Dillon, and Gabby La La. The album includes the song "Robot Chicken", which is the theme song of the show of the same name that airs on Adult Swim. His son Cage and his daughter Lena make a special appearance on the song "Back Off Turkey". The release was followed by a tour of the U.S. with the following lineup:

- Les Claypool – Bass Guitar, Upright Bass, Bassjo, vocals
- Skerik – Tenor Saxophone
- Mike Dillon – Vibraphone, Percussion
- Gabby La La – Sitar, Theremin
- Paulo Baldi – Drums

The lineup is called Les Claypool's Fancy Band and did national tours in both 2006 and 2007. A live DVD, Fancy, was recorded from the 2006 tour and released in 2007. The audio track includes a mix of both soundboard and taper recordings. A song from the album, "One Better", was used in National Lampoon's TV: The Movie in a fight scene between Preston Lacy and Lee Majors.

==== 2007–2016 ====
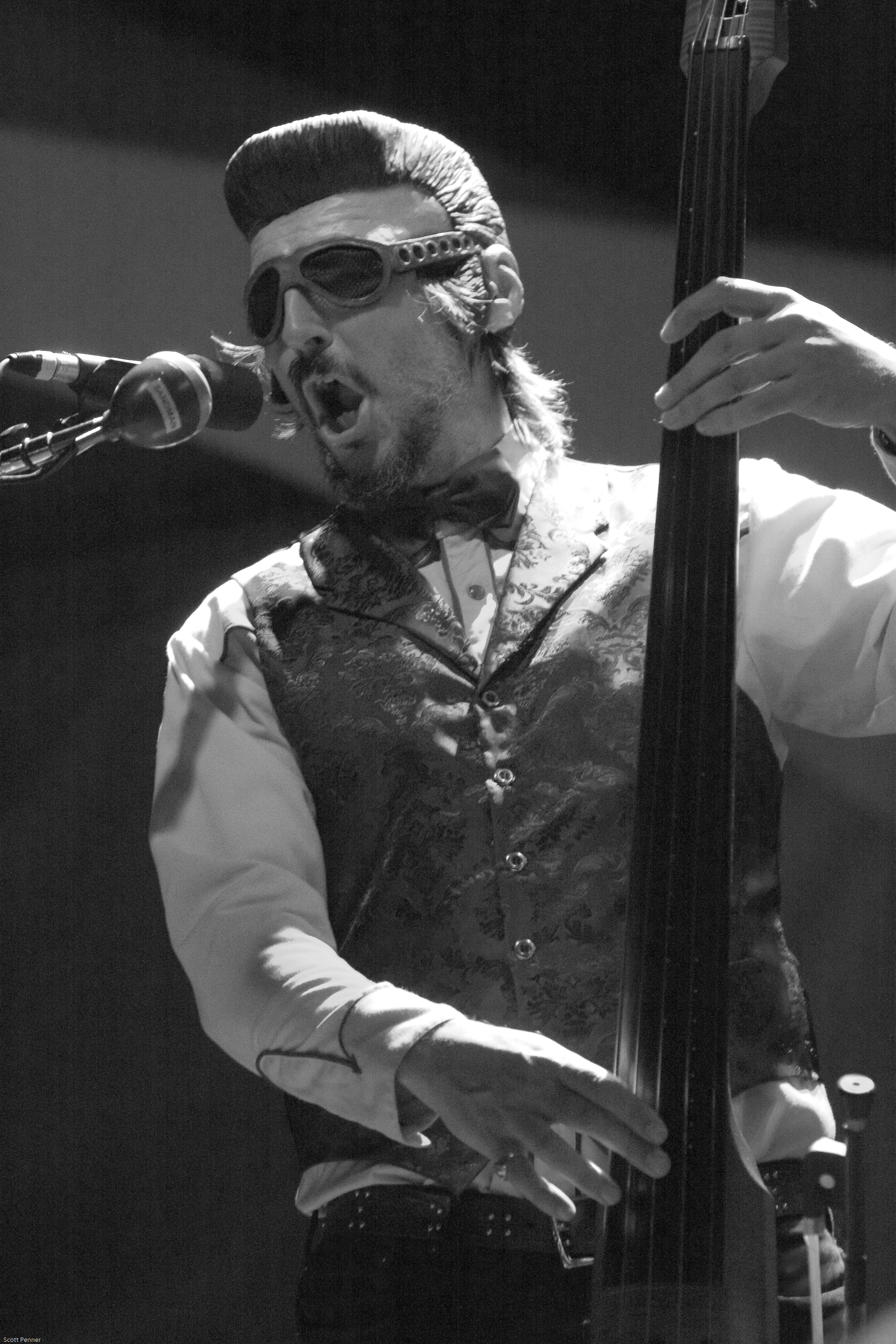
Claypool playing an upright bass in 2009

Besides touring in the summer of 2007 nationally with the Fancy Band, Claypool performed that October with a version of the band, dubbed the Fancy Trio. The trio consisted of Claypool, Skerik on saxophone, and Mike Dillon on drums, vibraphone and percussion. They played at The Echo Project, an inaugural ecologically minded 3-day festival in Fairburn, Georgia on the Boukeart family farm. The set was similar to that of the Fancy Band's tours, culling from Claypool' solo and Frog Brigade albums, as well containing a cover of "One Step Beyond" by Prince Buster and teases of other songs, including several Primus tunes, throughout their improvisational jams.

For many years Claypool has done a New Year's Eve show at The Fillmore in San Francisco. More recently the New Year's Eve show has been an annual New Year's Eve Hatter's Ball featuring a hat contest. December 31, 2007 was the 3rd such annual event.

In 2008, a United States tour spanned from February 29 to April 5. It kicked off at the Neighborhood Theatre in Charlotte, North Carolina and ended at The Warfield in San Francisco. The 2008 tour was a quartet featuring Claypool, Dillon, Skerik and Baldi.

During the year Claypool also performed several shows with Primus at festivals across America and Canada. Pig Hunt is a film directed by James Isaac released in 2008. Claypool contributes previously unreleased material and plays the role of "The Preacher". He composed several songs for the Wii game Mushroom Men, released in December 2008.

On December 31, 2008, Claypool rang in the New Year with his annual New Year's Eve show. It was at the San Francisco Opera House with Zappa Plays Zappa sharing the bill and playing first.

Claypool was also a judge for the 7th annual Independent Music Awards. His contributions helped assist upcoming independent artists' careers. His second solo album, Of Fungi and Foe, was released on March 17, 2009. The album consists of expanded material of the music from the Mushroom Men game, as well as the Pig Hunt motion picture, and features a guest appearance by Gogol Bordello's Eugene Hutz.

In 2009, Claypool toured with Matisyahu, performing as a 'double-feature' set, as well as appearing together on stage. On March 28, 2010, Claypool performed a rendition of Rush's "The Spirit of Radio" for their induction into the Canadian Songwriter's Hall of Fame.

From May 2010 to July 2013, Claypool toured extensively with Primus, alongside Larry LaLonde, and the return of former Primus drummer, Jay Lane. On September 6, 2012, a new side project was revealed as an acoustic band called Duo de Twang. Featuring Claypool and originally Marc Haggard. After two shows, Haggard was replaced with Bryan Kehoe. Both guitarists play together in the associated band M.I.R.V.

On September 25, 2013, it was announced Lane had left Primus to rejoin the Bob Weir group RatDog. Tim Alexander was named as his replacement. Claypool and Dean Ween worked together for a reality TV show called Musishermen.

On February 4, 2014, Duo de Twang released their debut album Four Foot Shack and began touring in late February. During the last part of the 2014 Spring Tour, Primus's drummer, Tim Alexander, had a small heart attack rendering him unable to play. Luckily instead of canceling the September shows, they were able to use their close friend Danny Carey as a drummer for the late shows.

On January 19, 2016, it was announced that The Claypool Lennon Delirium, a collaboration between Claypool and Sean Lennon, would debut at Bonnaroo 2016. Claypool has spoken fondly of the collaboration, stating, "Sean is a musical mutant after my own heart. He definitely reflects his genetics – not just the sensibilities of his dad, but also the abstract perspective and unique approach of his mother. It makes for a glorious freak stew."

On March 21, 2016, it was announced that the duo would release their debut album, entitled Monolith of Phobos, on June 3, 2016. Their second album, South of Reality, was released February 22, 2019.

On May 31, 2016, he was featured on the Death Grips song "More Than The Fairy".

==== The Claypool Lennon Delirium ====
In 2016, Claypool formed a group with Sean Lennon of The Ghost of a Saber Tooth Tiger, Paulo Baldi of Cake, and João Nogueira of Stone Giant. Claypool met Lennon in 2015 when he was on tour with Primus, The Ghost of a Saber Tooth Tiger, and Dinosaur Jr. Claypool stayed in touch with Lennon and the group released their first album The Monolith Of Phobos in 2016. On their first tour they switched out their keyboardist Money Mark of Beastie Boys for Pete Drungle. In 2017, The Delirium returned with their EP Lime And Limpid Green and released their second album South Of Reality in 2019, this time with Nogueira on keyboards.

=== Other work ===
Claypool was a special guest star in a Space Ghost Coast to Coast episode with the most celebrities on Cartoon Network in 1996.

Claypool's first book, South of the Pumphouse, was released on July 1, 2006, by Akashic Books. Copies of the book were sold during his 2006 tour of the U.S. following the release of Of Whales and Woe. The book is a dark tale of brothers, murder, drugs, and fishing; it has been likened to the work of Hunter S. Thompson. Claypool gave his first interview about the book on May 11, 2006.

Also in 2006, Claypool wrote and directed the mockumentary film Electric Apricot: Quest For Festeroo. It was shown at various film festivals and is a spoof of the jam band scene centered on the fake band Electric Apricot, with Claypool also playing the band's drummer and backing vocalist. The band performed real shows in the California area (such as High Sierra Music Festival) for the filming of the movie. During a question and answer session at the Tiburon Film Festival, where the film debuted, he said that the DVD would have an accompanying soundtrack CD. The film has won awards including Best Feature (audience choice) at the Malibu Film Festival. Claypool also said that the band would possibly perform a few select shows, but a tour never transpired as the film's star Adam Gates worked for Pixar, which made touring difficult.

In 2007, Claypool created Claypool Cellars, a wine-making project that turned into a boutique business. It makes wine from grapes grown in California's Russian River Valley. The wines are named based on his music, such as "Purple Pachyderm" and "Pink Platypus". "Purple Pachyderm" in particular was co-created alongside Claypool's wife, Chaney.

== Artistry ==
Claypool is well known for his "quirky and eccentric" style of bass playing, and is noted for his musical versatility. In addition to the sheer prominence of his bass playing on recorded works throughout his discography, Claypool's style also incorporates several other unusual techniques, such as flamenco-style strumming, tapping, slapping, and guitar-like chording. He has made prominent use of a Kahler "bass tremolo" vibrato system, as well as effects such as fuzz boxes and envelope filters. For most of his career, Claypool has played four-stringed basses, but has experimented with extended-range basses, most notably six-stringed models, as heard on songs like "Jerry Was a Race Car Driver", which features Claypool tapping the main melody on a fretless six-string bass; Claypool noted he was "getting more into the six-string" during the making of Pork Soda, giving the album a heavier edge.

Claypool has cited Rush and their bassist Geddy Lee, Larry Graham, Chris Squire, Tony Levin, Roger Waters, Paul McCartney, Geezer Butler, Bootsy Collins, Stanley Clarke, John Paul Jones, and the Residents as musical influences.

=== Equipment ===
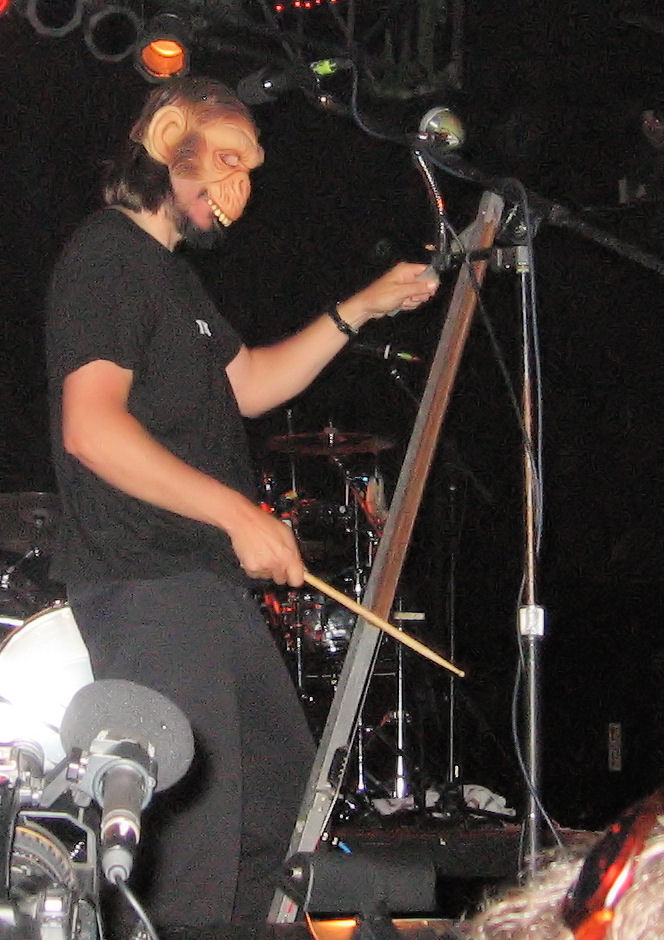
Claypool playing the Whamola in 2006

Claypool has, for a long time, endorsed Carl Thompson basses, but also uses a custom "Pachyderm" bass built by luthier Dan Maloney, and an NS Design upright bass. He uses Mesa/Boogie amplifiers, and an extensive set of effect pedals.

== Personal life ==
Claypool married clothes designer Chaney Smith in December 1995. They reside in Sonoma County, California, and have a son and daughter together.

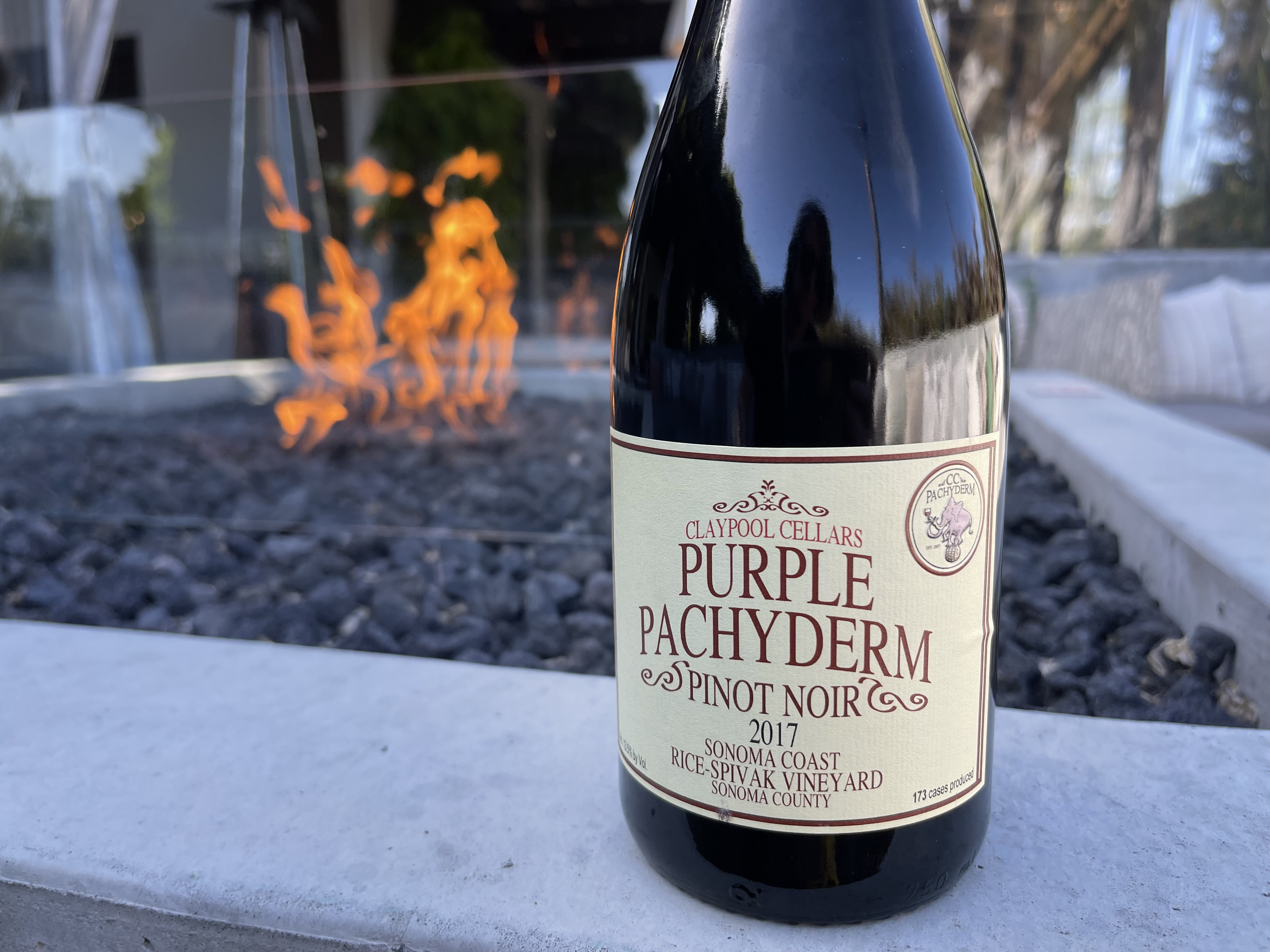
A bottle of Pinot Noir from Purple Pachyderm.

Claypool is known for his eccentric personality, surreal sense of humor, cannabis use and his love of wine. His love of wine led him to start the process of opening Pachyderm Station in Sebastopol, California with his wife Chaney in 2007. They produce high-end wine with the aim of providing the utmost flavor and quality, mainly focusing on Pinot Noir wines and Champagne. The company, whose name is Purple Pachyderm, originally released their wine in 2012. Ross Cobb and Katy Wilson were hired as the wine makers at the inception, but Wilson left in 2018 to pursue other ventures. The store and restaurant are open to the public for wine tasting and meals, where Les has a food truck that serves his Whamola Wieners, which are a high-end hotdog.

"Les Claypool Day" was declared by Cincinnati mayor John Cranley on June 12, 2018. It was presented to Claypool during Primus' show that night at the Riverbend Music Center by members of the Cincinnati USA Music Heritage Foundation, alongside Claypool's friend and influence Bootsy Collins.

== Discography ==
Year	Artist	Title
1986	Primus	Primus Sucks Demo Tape
1988	Blind Illusion	The Sane Asylum
1988	Primus	Sausage (demo)
1989	Primus	Suck on This (live album)
1990	Primus	Frizzle Fry
1991	Primus	Sailing the Seas of Cheese
1992	Primus	Miscellaneous Debris (EP)
1993	Primus	Pork Soda
1994	Sausage	Riddles Are Abound Tonight (1988 Primus line-up reunion)
1995	Primus	Tales from the Punchbowl
1996	Les Claypool and the Holy Mackerel	Highball with the Devil
1997	Primus	Brown Album
1998	Primus	Rhinoplasty (EP)
1999	Buckethead	Monsters and Robots (Claypool features on and co-wrote 6 of the 13 tracks)
1999	Primus	Antipop
2001	Colonel Les Claypool's Fearless Flying Frog Brigade	Live Frogs Set 1 (live album)
2001	Colonel Les Claypool's Fearless Flying Frog Brigade	Live Frogs Set 2 (live album)
2001	Oysterhead	The Grand Pecking Order
2002	The Les Claypool Frog Brigade	Purple Onion
2003	Primus	Animals Should Not Try to Act Like People (EP/DVD set)
2004	Colonel Claypool's Bucket of Bernie Brains	The Big Eyeball in the Sky
2006	Les Claypool	Of Whales and Woe
2006	Primus	They Can't All Be Zingers (greatest hits compilation album)
2008	Electric Apricot	Quest for Festeroo (soundtrack) (Claypool features on and co-wrote 5 of the 12 tracks)
2009	Les Claypool	Of Fungi and Foe
2010	Primus	June 2010 Rehearsal (EP)
2011	Primus	Green Naugahyde
2014	Les Claypool's Duo de Twang	Four Foot Shack
2014	Primus	Primus & the Chocolate Factory with the Fungi Ensemble
2016	The Claypool Lennon Delirium	Monolith of Phobos
2017	The Claypool Lennon Delirium	Lime and Limpid Green
2017	Primus	The Desaturating Seven
2018 (Recorded between 1983 & early 1990's)	Beanpole	All My Kin
2019	The Claypool Lennon Delirium	South of Reality
2022	Primus	Conspiranoid (EP)
2022	Primus	South Park: The 25th Anniversary Experience
2024	Primus 'SESSANTA'	Sessanta EPPP (Featuring Maynard James Keenan)
2026	Colonel Claypool’s Frog Brigade	Return of the Live Frogs Vol. 1
2026	The Claypool Lennon Delirium	The Great Parrot-Ox and the Golden Egg of Empathy
2026	Primus	A Handful of Nuggs

=== Guest appearances ===
(Claypool on bass unless otherwise noted)

- 1992 – Green Jellö - Cereal Killer (voice of Three Little Pigs)
- 1992 – Tom Waits – Bone Machine (on the track "Earth Died Screaming")
- 1994 – Firehose – Big Bottom Pow Wow (in discussion on the various "spiel" tracks)
- 1994 – Rob Wasserman – Trios (on the track "Home is Where You Get Across")
- 1996 – Alex Lifeson – Victor (on the track "The Big Dance")
- 1998 – Jerry Cantrell – Boggy Depot (on the tracks "Between" and "Cold Piece")
- 1998 – Metallica – Garage Inc. (banjo on the Lynyrd Skynyrd cover "Tuesday's Gone")
- 1998 – Bloem de Ligny – Zink (vocals on the track "Capsule")
- 1999 – Tom Waits – Mule Variations (on the track "Big in Japan")
- 1999 – Kenny Wayne Shepherd Band – Live On (on the track "Oh Well")
- 1999 – Limp Bizkit – Significant Other (vocals on the hidden track "The Mind of Les", bass and vocals on the outtake "Hell of a Band")
- 1999 – Phonopsycograph Disk – Live @ Slim's / Turbulence Chest (additional bass on 8 of the 12 tracks)
- 2002 – Fishbone – Fishbone and the Familyhood Nextperience Present: The Friendliest Psychosis of All (bass on track 1)
- 2002 – Gov't Mule – The Deep End, Volume 2 (bass and vocals on the tracks "Greasy Granny's Gopher Gravy" and "Drivin' Rain")
- 2003 – Gov't Mule – The Deepest End, Live In Concert (bass and vocals on the tracks "Greasy Granny's Gopher Gravy" and "Drivin' Rain")
- 2004 – Tom Waits – Real Gone (on the tracks "Hoist That Rag", "Shake It" and "Baby Gonna Leave Me")
- 2004 – Jack Irons – Attention Dimension (on the Pink Floyd cover "Shine On You Crazy Diamond")
- 2005 – Adrian Belew – Side One (on the tracks "Ampersand", "Writing on the Wall" and "Matchless Man")
- 2005 – Gabby La La – Be Careful What You Wish For... (bass and percussion throughout)
- 2005 – Mat Callahan – A Wild Bouquet (on the track "I See the Light")
- 2005 – Eric McFadden and Wally Ingram - Alektorophobia (on the tracks,"Tick Tock", "I Only Laugh When It Hurts" and "Dancing Song"
- 2006 – Adrian Belew – Side Three (on the tracks "Whatever" and "Men in Helicopters v4.0")
- 2006 – Tom Waits – Orphans: Brawlers, Bawlers, and Bastards (on the track "On The Road")
- 2008 – Zach Hill – Astrological Straits (on the track "Astrological Straits")
- 2009 – Vinyl – Fogshack Music Volume Two (on the tracks "Jelly James Jam", "Le Colonel", "Benthos" and "Le Colonel Part Deux")
- 2011 – Hank Williams III – Ghost to a Ghost/Gutter Town (on the tracks "Ghost to a Ghost" and "With the Ship")
- 2011 – Tom Waits – Bad as Me (on the track "Satisfied")
- 2013 – Beats Antique – A Thousand Faces: Act 1 (bass and vocals on the track "Beezlebub")
- 2016 – Death Grips – "More Than The Fairy"
- 2019 – The Desert Sessions – "Volume 11 – Arrivederci Despair"

==== Soundtracks and compilations ====
- 1991 – Guitars that Rule the World (promo for Guitar World magazine, featuring the original track "Filet of Soul" by Alex Skolnick with Claypool and Bryan Mantia)
- 1993 – Radio 501 (promo for Levi's jeans, featuring the original track "Can't Live Without" by Claypool, Jay Lane & Rob Wasserman)
- 2002 – NASCAR: Crank It Up (promo for NASCAR on Fox, featuring a cover of the Commander Cody track "Hot Rod Lincoln" recorded by Claypool)
- 2002 – Bonnaroo Music Festival 2002 (live album, featuring the Les Claypool's Frog Brigade track "Locomotive Breath")
- 2002 – Bonnaroo Vol. 2 (live album, featuring the Colonel Claypool's Bucket of Bernie Brains track "Number Two")
- 2004 – Concrete Corner: October Sampler 2004 (featuring the Colonel Claypool's Bucket of Bernie Brains track "Junior")
- 2004 – Never Been Done (soundtrack, featuring the Les Claypool's Frog Brigade track "David Makalaster")
- 2004 – Not In Our Name (benefit compilation album, featuring the Les Claypool's Frog Brigade track "David Makalaster II")
- 2004 – Under the Influence: Tribute to Lynyrd Skynyrd (compilation album, track "Call Me the Breeze")
- 2006 – Barnyard (soundtrack, featuring the original track "Hittin' the Hay" by North Mississippi Allstars with Claypool)
- 2008 – Pig Hunt (soundtrack, featuring the original tracks "Goblins in the Forest", "What You Lookin' At Boy?", "Boonville Stomp" and "Male Organ-Grinder")

Television show theme songs

- 2005–present – Robot Chicken: seasons 1–4 ("Robot Chicken", released on Of Whales and Woe, 2006)
- 2006–present – South Park: seasons 10–16 (mashup of "Whamola" by Les Claypool's Frog Brigade and "South Park Theme" by Primus)

Video game soundtracks

- 2008 – Mushroom Men: The Spore Wars (original tracks)

=== Videography ===
1991 – Bill & Ted's Bogus Journey, features Les Claypool performing with Primus.
2002 – Rising Low (Documentary on Allen Woody, directed by Mike Gordon)
2002 – Various Artists – Live from Bonnaroo Music Festival 2002 (featuring Les Claypool's Frog Brigade and Colonel Claypool's Bucket of Bernie Brains)
2003 – Gov't Mule – The Deepest End, Live In Concert
2005 – Les Claypool – 5 Gallons of Diesel
2007 – Les Claypool – Fancy
2008 – Electric Apricot: Quest for Festeroo (Rock- mockumentary feature film)
2011 – A Cure for Pain: The Mark Sandman Story (documentary on Mark Sandman)
2015- Theory of Obscurity: A Film About the Residents (documentary on The Residents)

== See also ==
- Avant-garde
- Buckethead
- Charlie Hunter Trio (1993)
- Duo de Twang
- Warren Haynes
- List of celebrities who own wineries and vineyards
- Oysterhead
- Tom Waits
