= Gabby La La =

- Gabby La La performing at The XM Sonic Stage at Bonnaroo 2005

Background information
- Also known as: Gabby La La
- Born: Gabby Lang; May 23, 1979 (age 47); Petaluma, California, United States
- Genres: Experimental
- Occupations: Singer, songwriter, musician
- Instruments: Vocals, sitar, accordion, ukulele, guitar, piano, theremin, omnichord
- Years active: 1992–present
- Label: Prawn Song Records
- Website: gabbylala.com

Gabby La La (born Gabriel Lang on May 23, 1979) is a vocalist and multi-instrumentalist (including sitar, ukulele, accordion, theremin and toy piano), signed to Prawn Song Records. Her music is self described as "fun, unique, crazy (and) kooky". La La's debut album, Be Careful What You Wish For..., is a collaboration with Les Claypool that though "peculiar... reveals gems of pop merriment."

Gabby La La is primarily a solo artist but, at times, she has been a member of Weapon of Choice, and she was a member of Les Claypool's Fancy Band.

== Career ==
La La sings with a high pitched voice "like art singer Dagmar Krause on helium". She plays the electric guitar, ukulele, toy piano, sitar, theremin, and accordion. She plays the sitar, on which she is classically trained, like she's playing a guitar. She also tap dances. She has been compared to Björk, Hello Kitty, and Yoko Ono. Her live band occasionally consists of Les Claypool on bass. She generally wears brightly colored wigs when she performs. La La has been called Claypool's protégé and she performs in his Fancy Band. She has performed on The Tonight Show with Jay Leno with Snoop Dogg. La La has performed with Jane Wiedlin and The Coup. She has taught young girls how to play rock music through music classes at the Phoenix Theater. La La has been reviewed and featured in the SFist, Metroactive and The Aquarian Weekly. She has been a solo performer at Bonnaroo.

== Personal life ==
La La was born in Petaluma, California. She has a sister, named Mimi. She has a child with Boots Riley.

== Discography ==
=== Studio albums ===
Year	Album
2005	Be Careful What You Wish For...
2011	I Know You Know I Know
2020	Disorganized crime: Smuggler's daughter

As writer, arranger, and/or performer

- 2004 The Big Eyeball in the Sky by Colonel Claypool's Bucket of Bernie Brains (CD; Prawn Song)
- 2005 True & Livin' by Zion I (CD, 2×LP; LiveUp)
- 2006 Of Whales and Woe by Les Claypool (CD, LP 180 gr.; Prawn Song)
- 2007 Turn My Teeth Up! by Baby Elephant (CD; Godforsaken Music)
