= Tales from the Punchbowl =

Studio album by Primus
- Released: June 6, 1995
- Recorded: November 1994 – March 1995
- Studio: Rancho Relaxo (Sebastopol, California)
- Genre: Progressive rock
- Length: 54:05
- Label: Interscope; Prawn Song
- Producer: Primus

Primus chronology
Pork Soda (1993)	Tales from the Punchbowl (1995)	Brown Album (1997)

Singles from Tales from the Punchbowl
- 1. "Wynona's Big Brown Beaver" Released: 1995; 2. "Mrs. Blaileen" Released: January 22, 1996

Alternative cover
- 1995 vinyl cover

Alternative cover
- 2018 vinyl re-release artwork

Tales from the Punchbowl is the fourth studio album by the American rock band Primus, released on June 6, 1995. It was the band's last album with Tim Alexander before he rejoined Primus seven years later, and again in September 2013. It was certified Gold on July 20, 1995.

== Enhanced CD reissue ==
In 1996 the album was re-released as an Enhanced CD for Macintosh and Windows. As printed on the back inlay for this version, "Combining high end production values, 3-D graphics, spectacular effects and loads of insanely cool stuff, the 'Tales From The Punchbowl' Enhanced CD, played on a CD-ROM drive, sends the viewer through a surreal virtual experience that features the complete album in CD sound quality (which you can hear on a stereo CD player as well)." Players must "navigate from the helm of Captain Shiner's ferryboat through an enchanted liquid atmosphere to many strange and mysterious islands. Many experiences are to be had, all in a rose-colored waterworld filled with visuals reminiscent of Dalí and Bosch." Printed on the actual CD is a ship helm instead of the large image of Captain Shiner's face that appeared on the original, more common pressing.

The vinyl cover shows a picture of the band members dressed up as penguins standing on an iceberg. The same picture comes with the CD version, on the first page of the booklet at the front.

== Reception and awards ==
Professional ratings
Review scores
Source	Rating
AllMusic	4/5 stars
Chicago Tribune	3/4 stars
Christgau's Consumer Guide	(2-star Honorable Mention)
Entertainment Weekly	B
Los Angeles Times	3/4 stars
The Rolling Stone Album Guide	2.5/5 stars
Spin	5/10

In his review for AllMusic, Daniel Gioffre describes the album as "unabashed prog rock ... which even the thick dollops of irony that the band seeks to impart to its compositions are unable to mask completely." He also says that "the high-energy angular rhythms that Primus is known and loved for are as present as ever; they are just pulled off with greater zest and looser precision (if there is such a thing) than they have in the past", concluding that "Tales From the Punchbowl is one of Primus' finer discs." Robert Christgau describes the album simply as "modern teen horrors simplified—and funkified." Chuck Eddy of Entertainment Weekly gave the album a B and said, "Hearing Les Claypool thwap oppressive bass lines while rapping like a congested auctioneer isn't nearly as entertaining as watching this trio fish for bass on MTV."

Tales from the Punchbowl was nearly as successful as Pork Soda; the former peaked at number eight on the Billboard 200, making it Primus' second-highest chart position. It is also the band's last studio album to be certified gold by the RIAA.

== Track listing ==
All lyrics are written by Les Claypool; all music is composed by Primus (Claypool, Larry LaLonde and Tim Alexander), except where noted.

No.	Title	Music	Length
1.	"Professor Nutbutter's House of Treats"		7:12
2.	"Mrs. Blaileen"		3:19
3.	"Wynona's Big Brown Beaver"		4:24
4.	"Southbound Pachyderm"		6:21
5.	"Space Farm"	Claypool, LaLonde	1:45
6.	"Year of the Parrot"		5:45
7.	"Hellbound 17½ (Theme From)"		2:59
8.	"Glass Sandwich"		4:05
9.	"Del Davis Tree Farm"		3:23
10.	"De Anza Jig"		2:26
11.	"On the Tweek Again"		4:41
12.	"Over the Electric Grapevine"		6:24
13.	"Captain Shiner"	Claypool	1:15
Total length:			54:05

== Personnel ==
- Les Claypool – vocals, bass, 6-string bass, bass banjo, upright bass, fretless bass
- Larry LaLonde – guitar, 6-string banjo
- Tim Alexander – drums, drum samples

== Charts ==
=== Weekly charts ===
Chart (1995)	Peak position
Australian Albums (ARIA)	8
Finnish Albums (Suomen virallinen lista)	33
US Billboard 200	8

=== Year-end charts ===
Chart (1995)	Position
US Billboard 200	125

== Certifications ==
Region	Certification	Certified units/sales
Canada (Music Canada)	Gold	50,000^{^}
United States (RIAA)	Gold	500,000^{^}
^{^} Shipments figures based on certification alone.
