= Sausage (band) =

Alternative/funk rock band

- 1994 press photo. From left: Jay Lane, Todd Huth, Les Claypool.

Background information
- Origin: El Sobrante, California, US
- Genres: Alternative rock, funk rock
- Years active: 1993–1994: (one-off reunions: 2019, 2021)
- Labels: Interscope, Prawn Song
- Spinoffs: Les Claypool's Frog Brigade, Les Claypool and the Holy Mackerel
- Spinoff of: Primus
- Past members: Les Claypool; Todd Huth; Jay Lane

Sausage was a short-lived alternative/funk rock band featuring a reunion of the 1988 lineup of the San Francisco Bay Area band Primus. They released the album Riddles Are Abound Tonight in April 1994 through the Interscope Records imprint Prawn Song Records.

Sausage reunited on December 31, 2019 to perform for the first time in 25 years.

== History ==
=== Primus ===
Primus was formed in 1984 by singer and bassist Les Claypool and guitarist Todd Huth. The two of them played with a number of drummers before settling on Tim "Curveball" Wright two years later. At this time, Jay Lane was playing with The Uptones, and later the Freaky Executives, for whom Claypool acted as a roadie. Claypool was a huge fan of Lane's, and when Wright left Primus in the summer of 1988, Lane was asked to suggest his replacement. Lane accepted the position himself, as the Freaky Executives were, in Claypool's words, "in record company hell. They were somehow getting dicked around by their record company".

After recording a demo together, which they titled Sausage, Lane left Primus at the end of 1988 when "something good happened" with the Freaky Executives' record deal. Huth also left shortly after, wishing to dedicate more time to his family as he had just had a son and was expecting another. Claypool continued Primus, replacing Huth and Lane with Larry LaLonde and Tim Alexander, respectively.

=== Riddles Are Abound Tonight ===
Riddles Are Abound Tonight

Studio album by Sausage
- Released: April 1994
- Genres: Alternative rock, funk rock
- Length: 48:41
- Labels: Interscope, Prawn Song
- Producer: Sausage

In 1993, Claypool, Huth, and Lane reunited to record the album Riddles Are Abound Tonight under the name Sausage, inspired by the demo they had recorded together in 1988. The album was released in April 1994 by Prawn Song Records, a vanity label owned by Claypool and subsidiary of Interscope Records, and was supported by a short tour during which the band opened for Helmet and Rollins Band.

==== Track listing ====
All lyrics are written by Claypool; all music is composed by Sausage.

No.	Title	Length
1.	"Prelude to Fear"	3:19
2.	"Riddles Are Abound Tonight"	3:55
3.	"Here's to the Man"	5:14
4.	"Shattering Song"	7:06
5.	"Toyz 1988" (Alternate version of "The Toys Go Winding Down")	5:50
6.	"Temporary Phase"	5:59
7.	"Girls for Single Men"	6:31
8.	"Recreating"	4:22
9.	"Caution Should Be Used While Driving a Motor Vehicle or Operating Machinery"	6:21
Total length:		48:41

==== Critical reception ====
Professional ratings
Review scores
Source	Rating
AllMusic	3/5 stars

In his review for AllMusic, Bret Love compared the album to Primus' output favourably in some respects, describing Sausage as "a tighter, more focused groove machine" with a "more accessible sound", but also noted that the lack of "instrumental virtuosity, strange time signatures, and almost constant left-field changes" would likely leave Primus fans generally unsatisfied.

==== Music video ====
Claypool, Lane and Huth in the "Riddles Are Abound Tonight" video.

A music video was made for the title track, "Riddles Are Abound Tonight", co-directed by Claypool and Mark Kohr and filmed at the Oakland Scottish Rite Clinic for Childhood Language Disorders. It shows the band members playing their instruments in close proximity while each wearing a hooded blue leotard featuring a small lightbulb on the end of an antenna, similar to that of an anglerfish. These tops are then revealed to all be connected at the waist and part of a larger sheet of fabric that stretches out to cover the top of a three-tiered scaffold structure surrounded by various lamps and stage lights. Under the sheet, the band are pedalling stationary bicycles that in turn run a vast series of gears powering the lights. The middle layer of the scaffold structure houses a go-go dancer, and below her a woman in a Victorian dress uses sign language while children in similar attire perform a baroque dance around the structure.

On-set, Kohr described the video as a metaphor; the band representing "the gods... above the blue sky... pedalling the works of the universe", their music filtering down through "the black goddess woman... the personification of the sensuality within the music" until it reaches "Mother Earth, communicating the lines of the music to the people... adults, but they're little kids. So basically, we're teaching the kids how to dance." Claypool, on the other hand, said "I just thought it would look cool... like a giant penis, and we were the blue sperm."

The video was featured on Beavis and Butt-Head, during which Butt-Head mockingly referred to the band as "The Seminifreous Tubloidial Buttnoids". The music video was later included on Claypool's retrospective DVD 5 Gallons of Diesel alongside a short clip about the making of the video, and live footage of the band performing "Prelude to Fear".

=== After Sausage ===
In 1996, Claypool released his debut solo album, Highball with the Devil, featuring Lane playing drums on four tracks. In the summer of 2000, Claypool, Huth and Lane reunited with additional musicians as Colonel Les Claypool's Fearless Flying Frog Brigade, releasing the albums Live Frogs Set 1 and Live Frogs Set 2 in 2001. Lane also appears on four tracks of the Frog Brigade's 2002 studio album, Purple Onion, though Huth does not. In 2010, Lane rejoined Primus with Claypool and Larry LaLonde, featuring on the June 2010 Rehearsal EP and the 2011 studio album Green Naugahyde.

The band reunited for the first time in 25 years on December 31, 2019 to celebrate New Year's Eve.

== Band members ==
- Les Claypool – bass, vocals
- Todd Huth – guitar, vocals
- Jay Lane – drums
