= Jay Lane =

American drummer

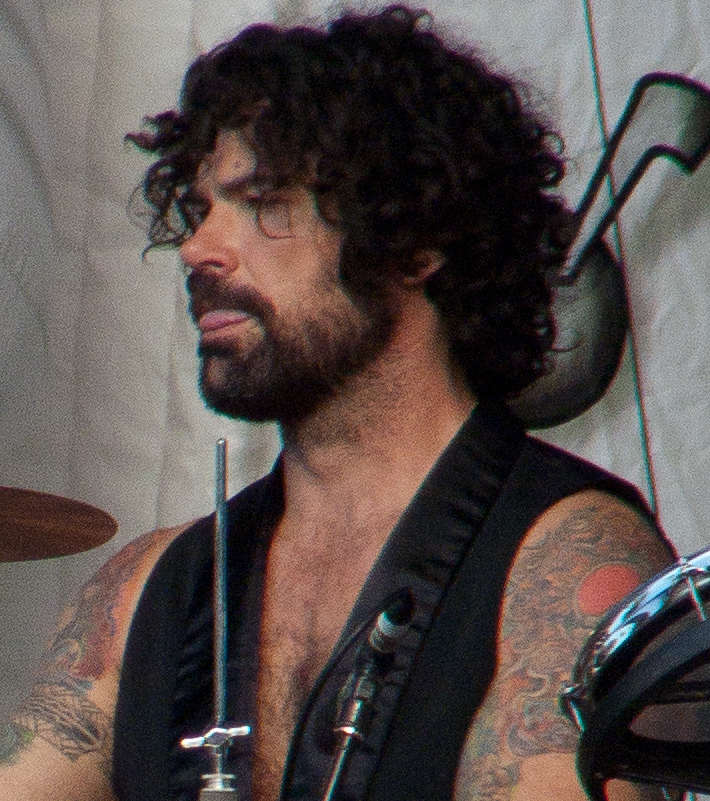
- Lane with Primus, Soundwave festival, Brisbane, Australia, 2011

Background information
- Born: December 5, 1964 (age 61); San Francisco, California, U.S.
- Genres: Alternative metal; funk rock; progressive rock; experimental rock
- Occupation: Musician
- Instrument: Drums
- Years active: 1982–present
- Labels: Prawn Song; Blue Note; Grateful Dead Records
- Member of: RatDog; Wolf Bros; Dead & Company
- Formerly of: Primus; Les Claypool's Frog Brigade; Charlie Hunter Trio; Sausage; Freaky Executives; The Uptones; Furthur; Golden Gate Wingman
- Website: JayLane.net (archived)

Jay Lane (born December 5, 1964) is an American musician. He is a founding member of Bob Weir's RatDog, with Weir and Rob Wasserman, and plays with the Wolf Bros, Furthur, Golden Gate Wingmen, Dead & Company and Alphabet Soup. He was the fifth and then the eighth drummer in Primus, playing with the band for most of 1988 and later rejoining the band from 2010 to 2013. Lane was a member of the San Francisco Bay Area bands the Uptones from 1983 to 1985, and the Freaky Executives during 1984–1989.

== Biography ==
Lane was born in San Francisco. Lane began learning to play the drums at age nine, taking lessons with Bob Rose, and later Steve Savage, founder of Blue Bear School of Music in San Francisco. Lane continued to take lessons for two years. In 1979 during the 7th grade at Everett Jr. High School, his jazz band teacher and local tenor sax great Jerry Logas turned him on to the Jazz/Fusion group Weather Report and that was it, music was going to be his choice. He and best buddy Ray Paul Carter took turns torturing their beloved jazz band teacher between classes. At sixteen years old, he took a summer sanitation job at Cazadero Music Camp in Russian River California where he met the rest of his best lifetime friends to this day: future Ratdog/Charlie Hunter Trio/Uptones saxophonist Dave Ellis, future Spearhead guitarist Dave Shul, brothers Alcide and Andre Marshall ( sons of local jazz legend drummer Eddy Marshall ). It was at this Summer music camp the decision to play music as a way of life was solidified for this tight group of friends. Some of the counselors at Cazadero Music and Arts Camp during that time ('80-'83) included Bobby McFerrin and Whoopi Goldberg, among other local jazz greats like John Handy, Eddy Marshall, Pete Escovedo, and the great Ed Kelly.

=== 1980s ===
In 1982, Lane played with Dave Shul in the band Ice Age. In 1983, he joined Bay Area ska punk band The Uptones when their saxophonist left, prompting drummer Dave Ellis to switch instruments. They released an album, K.U.S.A., before Lane left in 1985 to join the Freaky Executives. After four years of gigging the Executives landed a record deal with Warner Bros. Records. It was during this time that Lane met Primus bassist Les Claypool in the bands' shared warehouse rehearsal space in Emeryville and would converse in the hallways, eventually jamming together. Claypool, Lane, and guitarist Todd Huth played together as Primus for about eight months, and recorded a demo cassette tape named Sausage. at Fungo Mungo's modified storage container rehearsal space, mixed by Matt Winegar.

=== 1990s ===
After a 4-year dry spell, In 1994 Les Claypool called Lane for a recording session at San Francisco's famed Hyde St Studios that Grammy winning upright bass virtuoso Rob Wasserman had hired him for. It was to be acoustic bass, electric bass and drums recording one quick jam for a Levi's 501 jeans ad. After neither bassist wanted to, Lane added the vocal speaking part. After the session Wasserman asked Lane if he would do a session at Grateful Dead guitarist Bob Weir's home studio for a broadway musical Weir was working on with avant guard saxophonist David Murray about legendary baseball player Satchel Paige. They were looking for a drummer that could play quietly with brushes. Lane then joined the Weir Wasserman Duo with double bass player Wasserman and Grateful Dead guitarist Bob Weir. Lane was reunited with Cazadero Music Camp friend Dave Ellis when he joined jazz combo the Charlie Hunter Trio, and co-founded the hip hop/jazz fusion group Alphabet Soup. The Charlie Hunter Trio released their debut album, Charlie Hunter Trio, in 1993. Lane Wasserman and Claypool also then later performed a song at the Bammies as 3 Guys Names Shmoe.

Lane later reunited with Claypool and Huth as the band Sausage, named in recognition of the Primus demo they recorded together six years prior. They recorded a single album, 1994's Riddles Are Abound Tonight, followed by a short tour in support of Helmet and Rollins Band. In 1995, Lane released his last album with the Charlie Hunter Trio, Bing, Bing, Bing!, as well as Alphabet Soup's debut, Layin' Low in the Cut, and following the death of Jerry Garcia, the trio of Lane, Weir and Wasserman became the basis for the band RatDog. In 1996, Alphabet Soup released their second album, Strivin', and Lane guested on Claypool's debut solo album Highball with the Devil. In 1997, Lane guested on Christión's debut album, Ghetto Cyrano, playing keyboards.

=== 2000s ===
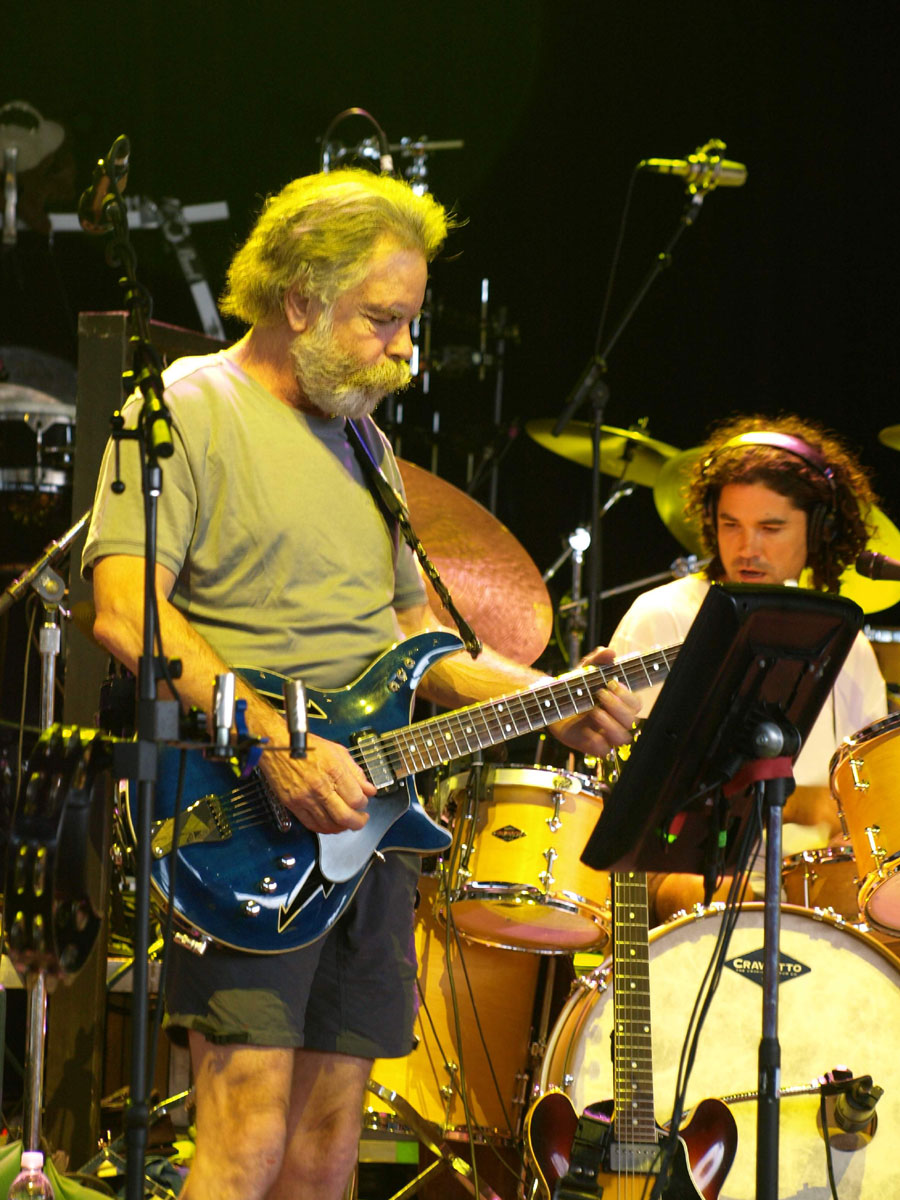
Lane and Weir performing with RatDog in April 2009.

Throughout the 2000s, Lane continued to tour with RatDog, playing hometown shows with Alphabet Soup whenever they had a break in the schedule. In 2000, RatDog released their own debut album, Evening Moods, followed by Live at Roseland in 2001. Also in 2001, Lane appeared once more alongside Claypool and Huth, plus others, on the Colonel Les Claypool's Fearless Flying Frog Brigade albums Live Frogs Set 1 and Live Frogs Set 2, the latter of which is a complete performance of Pink Floyd's Animals. In 2002, Lane guested on the Frog Brigade's studio album, Purple Onion, and was named "drummer of the year" by the California Music Awards.

In 2005, Claypool released his retrospective DVD 5 Gallons of Diesel, featuring many projects that included Lane, and Lane toured with him as part of his Fancy Band. In 2006, many members of Alphabet Soup branched out to form the hip hop/reggae fusion group Band of Brotherz, and Lane joined shortly after. They released their debut album Deadbeats and Murderous Melodys in 2009, featuring covers of Grateful Dead songs, supported by a tour of the East Coast of the United States and a number of dates nationwide with special guests, including the trio of Lane, Weir and Wasserman reunited under the name Scaring the Children. At the end of 2009, Weir put RatDog on hiatus in order to dedicate his time to forming the band Furthur with Phil Lesh, and Lane joined them as a charter member.

=== 2010s ===
In 2010, Lane left both Furthur and Band of Brotherz to rejoin Primus with Claypool and long-standing guitarist Larry LaLonde, and they released the free June 2010 Rehearsal digital EP, followed in 2011 by a new album, titled Green Naugahyde. As of 2012, Lane's official site still credited him as an active member of RatDog despite the hiatus, as well as Alphabet Soup, and Scaring the Children. In September 2013, it was revealed that Lane had left Primus to rejoin RatDog, who were ending their hiatus. In 2014 Jay Joined The Golden Gate Wingmen. They are a jam band formed in November 2014, featuring Jeff Chimenti, John Kadlecik from Dark Star Orchestra & Reed Mathis from Tea Leaf Green. They record every show and release them to download.

In 2018, Lane joined Weir and bassist Don Was to form Wolf Bros, a trio which undertook a North American tour in the Fall of 2018, and continued with a second tour of twenty more shows in the Spring of 2019.

Lane currently endorses Ludwig drums, Sabian cymbals, and Innovative Percussion drumsticks.

=== 2020s ===
Lane joined Dead & Company as a stand-in drummer for their October 19 and 20, 2021 shows at Red Rocks in Morrison, CO, their October 22 and 23 shows at Fiddler's Green in Greenwood Village, CO, and their October 31 show at Hollywood Bowl in Los Angeles, CA. For the Dead & Company 2022 Summer Tour, he sat in for Bill Kreutzmann starting with the Bethel, NY show. With Kreutzmann stepping out for the final Dead & Company tour in 2023, Jay Lane has played each show on the tour.

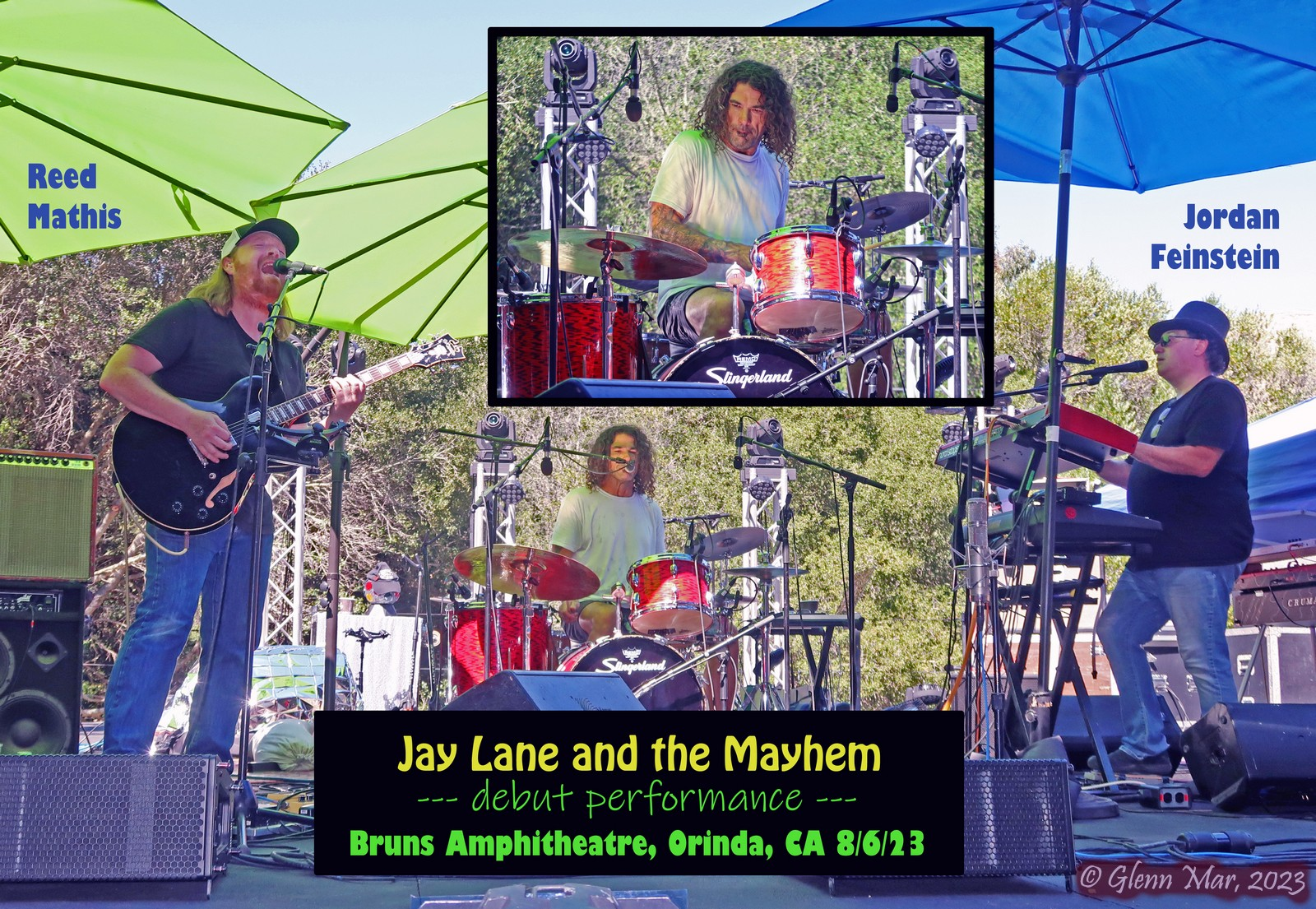
Three weeks after the last show on the final tour of Dead and Company, Jay Lane debuted the first band under his own name. They opened for ALO at the Bruns Amphitheatre in Orinda, CA.

== Discography ==
1984 – The Uptones – K.U.S.A.
1988 – Primus – Sausage (demo)
1993 – Charlie Hunter Trio – Charlie Hunter Trio
1994 – Sausage – Riddles Are Abound Tonight
1995 – Charlie Hunter Trio – Bing, Bing, Bing!
1995 – Alphabet Soup – Layin' Low in the Cut
1996 – Alphabet Soup – Strivin'
1996 – Les Claypool and the Holy Mackerel – Highball with the Devil
1997 – Christión – Ghetto Cyrano
2000 – RatDog – Evening Moods
2001 – RatDog – Live at Roseland
2001 – Colonel Les Claypool's Fearless Flying Frog Brigade – Live Frogs Set 1
2001 – Colonel Les Claypool's Fearless Flying Frog Brigade – Live Frogs Set 2
2002 – The Les Claypool Frog Brigade – Purple Onion
2005 – Les Claypool – 5 Gallons of Diesel (DVD)
2009 – Band of Brotherz – Deadbeats and Murderous Melodys
2010 – Primus – June 2010 Rehearsal (EP)
2011 – Primus – Green Naugahyde
2022 – Bobby Weir & Wolf Bros – Live in Colorado
2022 – Bobby Weir & Wolf Bros – Live in Colorado Vol. 2
