= Darlin' Cory =

American folk song

- American folk song
- Other name: "Darling Corey", etc.
- Catalogue: Roud 5723
- Recorded: 1927: U.S.

"Darlin' Cory" (also "Darling Corey" or "Darling Cora") (Roud 5723) is an American folk song about love, loss, and moonshine. It is similar in theme to "Little Maggie" and "The Gambling Man" but is not considered the same as those songs.

== Early printed versions ==
The earliest published version of "Darlin' Corey" occurs as verses within the song "The Gambling Man", collected from oral tradition by folklorist Cecil Sharp, as sung by Mrs. Clercy Deeton, at Mine Fork, Burnsville, N.C., on Sept. 19, 1918. (Note: It occurs only in version B of this song (i.e., "The Gambling Man"), published as No. 152 (with tune) in English Folk Songs from the Southern Appalachians (1936).) The text (without tune) was also published as "Little Cora" in Harvey H. Fuson's Ballads of the Kentucky Highlands (London, 1931). A version from the singing of Aunt Molly Jackson appears in the book Our Singing Country (1941) by John A. Lomax and Alan Lomax. It is also included in Folk Song, U.S.A. by John A. and Alan Lomax, Charles Seeger and Ruth Crawford Seeger (Duell, Sloan and Pearce, 1947), pp. 310–311.

== Early recordings ==
The first known commercial audio recording was made by Clarence Gill as "Little Corey" on January 6, 1927, but was rejected by the record company and never released. A few months later, folk singer Buell Kazee recorded it as "Darling Cora" on April 20, 1927 (Brunswick 154). Later the same year, on July 29, 1927, at the famous Bristol Sessions an influential version was recorded by B. F. Shelton as "Darlin' Cora" (Victor 35838). Other early recordings are "Little Lulie" by Dick Justice (1929) and "Darling Corey", released as a single by the Monroe Brothers in 1936.

In 1941, The Monroe Brothers' version was included in a landmark 5-disc compilation, Smoky Mountain Ballads, produced and annotated by noted folklorist John A. Lomax (Victor Records). Whereas the earlier, "hillybilly" records had been marketed regionally, "Smoky Mountain Ballads" was intended for broad, urban audiences. It comprised reissues of ten comparatively recent commercially issued hillbilly recordings from the 1930s, including, in addition to the performance of "Darlin' Cory" by the Monroe Brothers, songs by the Carter Family, Uncle Dave Macon, Mainer's Mountaineers, and other Southeastern performers. Smoky Mountain Ballads became a staple in the repertoires of 1940s and early '50s folk music revival singers such as Pete Seeger, who was meticulous in crediting his sources and urged that people copy them and not him. That same year on May 28, 1941, Burl Ives also recorded "Darlin' Cory" for his debut album Okeh Presents the Wayfaring Stranger (issued August 1941 with liner notes by Alan Lomax).

== Lyrics ==
Wake up, wake up darlin cory
Tell me what makes you sleep so sound
The revenue officers are comin
Gonna tear your still house down

[Chorus]
Dig a hole, dig a hole in the meadow
Dig a hole in the cold, cold ground
Dig a hole, dig a hole in the meadow
Gonna lay darlin cory down

Oh the first time I saw darlin cory
She was standin in the door
She had her shoes and her stockings in her hand
And her little bare feet on the floor

Oh the next time I saw darlin cory
She was standin by the banks of the sea
she had a 44 strapped around her body
And a banjo on her knee

Oh the last time I saw darlin cory
She had a wine glass in her hand
She was drinkin that sweet liquor
With a low down gamblin man.

== Other recordings ==
Numerous artists have recorded versions of "Darlin' Cory", including:

- Flatt and Scruggs (as "Dig A Hole In The Meadow") on Flatt and Scruggs at Carnegie Hall, 1963
- Mike Seeger
- Roscoe Holcomb
- John Hartford (as "Dig a Hole") on Steam Powered Aereo-Takes, 1971
- Doc Watson
- Bruce Hornsby
- The Weavers
- Crooked Still
- Bill Monroe
- Harry Belafonte (as "Darlin' Cora," attributed to Fred Brooks, a pseudonym used by Fred Hellerman),
- Holly Golightly & The Brokeoffs (as "Cora")
- Lonnie Donegan
- Buddy Greene
- Eileen Ivers
- Crooked Still
- Pete Seeger
- Old Crow Medicine Show
- The Kingston Trio, on At Large, 1959
- Tao Rodríguez-Seeger (grandson of Pete Seeger)
- Bill Clifton
- Rio en Medio
- The Seldom Scene
- Chris Jones
- Chuck Ragan and Austin Lucas, on Bristle Ridge, 2008
- Red Molly
- Dan Levenson
- Bryn Haworth, on Sunny Side of the Street, 1975
- Maddox Brothers and Rose (as "Dig a Hole")
- Bob Weir, as "Lay My Lily Down", on his 2016 Blue Mountain
- Maxida Märak, (as "Darling Corey" with Downhill Bluegrass Band) on Mountain Songs and Other Stories, 2014
- Amythyst Kiah (In her 2013 album "Dig")
- Joe Brown, as "Darling Corrie"
- Blood Oranges, as "Dig a Hole"
- Jean Ritchie
