= Only a River =

Single by Bob Weir

from the album Blue Mountain
- Released: August 18, 2016
- Recorded: Spring/Fall 2015
- Genre: Country rock, Rock
- Length: 5:28
- Label: Legacy/Columbia
- Songwriters: Bob Weir, Josh Ritter, Josh Kaufman
- Producers: Bob Weir, Josh Kaufman

“Only a River" is a song by Bob Weir, written in collaboration with Josh Ritter and Josh Kaufman. The song is the first single from his third solo album, Blue Mountain. The album was written by Weir in collaboration with members of The National; Josh Ritter, Josh Kaufman, Scott Devendorf, Joe Russo, and The Walkmen's Walter Martin, along with lyricists Josh Ritter, Gerrit Graham, and John Perry Barlow. The producer is Josh Kaufman.

"Only a River" was released on NPR's All Things Considered for streaming.

== Origins ==
Josh Ritter initially composed the song as a college student, writing on Twitter that "I wrote that song in the stairwell of my dorm in college, 25 years ago. Music is a blessed traveler". He later added, "I wrote Only a River in my dorm in college. Like all my favorites, it came unbidden, and I just wrote it down. Many years later, as I got the amazing opportunity to work with Bob Weir of the Grateful Dead, this song rose to the top of the pack, asking to be let out the door".

The recorded version on Blue Mountain lists Ritter as the song's lyricist, but credits Ritter, Weir, and Josh Kaufman as musical composers.

== Cover version ==
Bob Dylan covered the song live in Nagoya, Japan on April 20, 2023, the final show of the Japanese leg of his Rough and Rowdy Ways World Wide Tour. Scott Bernstein of JamBase appraised the performance positively, writing that "Dylan's voice fit 'Only a River' like a glove", and complimented Donnie Herron's "beautiful" pedal steel work and Jerry Pentecost's "tasteful" drumming.

== Musicians ==
- Bob Weir – Vocals, Guitar
- Aaron Dessner – Electric Guitar
- Scott Devendorf – Bass, Vocals
- Ray Rizzo – drums, harmonium, harmonica, backup vocals
- Rob Burger – keyboard, accordion, tuned percussion
