= The Campfire Tour =

2016 concert tour by Bob Weir and the National

- Tour by Bob Weir
- Promotional poster for The Campfire Tour.
- Location: United States
- Associated album: Blue Mountain
- Start date: October 7th, 2016
- End date: October 20th, 2016
- Legs: 1
- No. of shows: 9 in North America

Bob Weir concert chronology
- Dead And Company Summer Tour (2016); The Campfire Tour (2016)

The Campfire Tour is a 2016 mini-tour by Bob Weir backed by members of the indie-rock band the National: Aaron Dessner, Bryan Devendorf, Scott Devendorf, and Josh Kaufman, in support of his third solo album Blue Mountain. The tour spanned nine shows and eight venues on the East and West coasts. The tour began on October 7, 2016, at the Marin County Civic Centre in San Rafael, California and wrapped up on October 20, 2016 at the Chicago Theatre in Chicago, IL. While Weir had enlisted Aaron Dessner of the National to be a part of his backing band for the jaunt, Dessner had pulled out due to a family emergency. Weir announced his longtime collaborator Steve Kimock has stepped up to join the backing band which also includes new addition Jon Shaw (Cass McCombs/Shakey Graves) on bass as well.

Weir and the band also promoted the tour and accompanying album with a performance of "Lay My Lily Down" on The Late Show with Stephen Colbert, on October 17, 2016.

== Tour dates ==
The band performed a total of nine concerts in eight U.S. cities.

Date	City	Country	Venue	Revenue	Attendance
October 7, 2016	San Rafael	United States	Marin County Civic Center	—N/a	—N/a
October 8, 2016	Oakland	United States	Fox Oakland Theatre	—N/a	—N/a
October 10, 2016	Los Angeles	United States	The Wiltern	—N/a	—N/a
October 12, 2016	Upper Darby	United States	Tower Theatre	—N/a	—N/a
October 14, 2016	New York City	United States	Kings Theatre	—N/a	—N/a
October 15, 2016	New York City	United States	Kings Theatre	—N/a	—N/a
October 16, 2016	Port Chester	United States	Capitol Theatre	—N/a	—N/a
October 19, 2016	Nashville	United States	Ryman Auditorium	—N/a	—N/a
October 20, 2016	Chicago	United States	Chicago Theatre	—N/a	—N/a

== Musicians ==
- Bob Weir - guitar, vocals
- Steve Kimock - guitar, lap steel guitar
- Jon Shaw - bass guitar, rhodes, vocals
- Bryan Devendorf - drums
- Scott Devendorf - bass guitar, guitar, vocals
- Josh Kaufman - guitar, vocals, lap steel guitar
