= Blue Mountain (Bob Weir album) =

Studio album by Bob Weir
- Released: September 30, 2016
- Recorded: Spring and Fall 2015 in Woodstock, New York, and San Rafael, California
- Genres: Rock, country, folk
- Length: 51:43
- Label: Legacy/Columbia
- Producers: Josh Kaufman, Bob Weir

Bob Weir chronology
| Fall 1989: The Long Island Sound (2013) | Blue Mountain (2016) | Live in Colorado (2022) |

Singles from Blue Mountain
- 1. "Only a River" Released: August 18, 2016; 2. "Gonesville" Released: September 8, 2016; 3. "Lay My Lily Down" Released: September 12, 2016

Blue Mountain is the third and final solo album by former Grateful Dead singer and guitarist Bob Weir, released on September 30, 2016. The album was inspired by his time working as a ranch hand in Wyoming when he was fifteen years old. It is Weir's first solo studio album since Heaven Help the Fool, released in 1978 and first studio album since recording Evening Moods as the leader of RatDog in 2000.

Blue Mountain reached No. 14 on the Billboard 200 album chart, becoming his highest charting album. Songs from the album were frequently performed live by Weir with his band Bobby Weir & Wolf Bros.

== Background ==
In a July 2015 NPR interview, guitarist Josh Ritter stated that Weir was working on an album of "cowboy songs". In August 2015, during an interview with Dan Rather, Weir performed a ballad, titled "Blue Mountain" from the upcoming album. On February 12, 2016, while performing at Sweetwater Music Hall for a benefit for Ring Mountain Day School, Weir debuted two new originals from the album; "Gonesville", and "Lay My Lily Down".

Musicians on the album include Ritter, Josh Kaufman, Scott Devendorf, Joe Russo, and The Walkmen's Walter Martin, along with lyricists Gerrit Graham and John Perry Barlow. Kaufman is the producer.

Weir set out on a 9-date "Campfire Tour" in support of the album in October 2016, making stops on the West and East coasts. He was backed on the tour by members of the National, including Aaron Dessner, Bryan Devendorf, Scott Devendorf, and Josh Kaufman.

Weir previewed and performed selections from the new album at The Heath at The McKittrick Hotel, in New York City on August 4, for around 120 people. He was joined for the performances by Josh Kaufman. Song selections performed included "Blue Mountain," "Lay My Lily Down," and "Ki-Yi Bossie," and Weir also previewed the album cuts of "Only a River", "Ki-Yi Bossie", and "Ghost Towns".

Weir also spoke at length about certain tracks, indicating that the song "Ki-Yi Bossie" – a song Weir said he wrote for the ailing Barlow – was a true campfire song that tells the tale of a whiskey and cocaine-filled night. When an audience member asked him about the song following the performance, Weir said, "I wrote it the way I thought he would've." Rolling Stone also reported that "Ki-Yi Bossie," will be a campfire singalong with Ramblin' Jack Elliott." Talking about "Lay My Lily Down", Mason prompted Weir on the content of the record, noting the song contained quite a bit of sadness. "Because I've been there," Weir responded when asked how he transported himself to that mood. The emotional reading of the next song came from, according to Weir, listening to a lot of Appalachian music.

On August 18, 2016, the first single from the album, "Only a River" was released on NPR's All Things Considered for streaming. It was written in collaboration with Josh Ritter. NPR's Felix Contreras calls "Only A River" an emotional reflection on life that references the 19th-century American folk song "Shenandoah."

Weir described the making and collaboration process of Blue Mountain: "When I was 15 I ran away to be a cowboy. I found myself working in Wyoming living in a bunk house with a bunch of old cowpokes and ranch hands, and a lot of those guys had grown up in a era before radio had even got to Wyoming. Their idea of an evening was to tell stories and sing songs. I was the kid with the guitar I was the accompaniment.I learned a bunch of those songs and got steeped into that tradition. It's a tradition that's almost gone. I've been sort of wondering what to do with that, for decades now. About four years ago, I did a webcast with Josh and a bunch of the guys from The National. I enjoyed playing with them a bunch. They decided that they liked my cowboy tunes with the Grateful Dead, and proposed a project where we do some stuff like that. That proposal kinda rang my bells."

On September 8, 2016, the second single from the album, "Gonesville", was premiered on Rolling Stone's website for streaming. It was also written in collaboration with Josh Ritter. Rolling Stone's Elias Leight describes "Gonesville" as "Weir and his band shambling cheerfully here: The bass line hints at the verve of honky tonk, the harmonica scoots forward and the lead guitar spits lively licks. A raft of backing vocalists join in during the chorus, adding to the cool, festive air, and "Gonesville" comes to a close with a jaunty group chant."

Speaking about the inspiration for "Gonesville", Weir described the song as "being a take on a Rockabilly tune. I was trying to go back and channel Elvis for the vocal, and for the music as well."

On September 12, 2016, the third song, "Lay My Lily Down", had its premiere on NPR's World Cafe for streaming. Speaking about the song, writer David Dye stated that ""Lay My Lily Down," written with Ritter and Kaufman, sounds like a traditional song. It's a haunting tune, sung in the voice of a father as he buries his daughter. The powerful backing music is a dense, steadily building meld of minor-key guitars."

Speaking about the song, Weir stated that "The song was the brainchild of Josh Kaufman. And he was lifting it from "Lay My Corey Down", an old folk tune. I found a thread that wove into the song that wants to be banjo-oriented. Over the years I've been trying to frail the guitar, as in claw-hammer, banjo style."

Weir stated that "Ki-Yi Bossie" was written "remembering some of the guys I'd met on the ranch who'd yearned for a simpler life and found themselves better outside of civilization."

Blue Mountain is Weir's first solo release since Weir Here in 2004, and the first to feature entirely new music in 30 years.

== Critical reception ==
Professional ratings
Aggregate scores
| Source | Rating |
|---|---|
| Metacritic | 75/100 |
Review scores
| Source | Rating |
| AllMusic | 4.5/5 stars |
| Entertainment Weekly | A− |
| The Independent | 3/5 stars |
| Pitchfork | 7.5/10 |
| PopMatters | 7/10 stars |
| Rolling Stone | 3.5/5 stars |

The album was well-received by critics. Pitchfork writer Jesse Jarnow called the album "quietly adventurous, wise, and a welcome late-career turn." Entertainment Weekly writer Eric Renner Brown rated the album a 91/100, and described the album as "a moving group of tunes worthy of any campfire." Rolling Stone writer Richard Gehr wrote that "The highlight is his self-penned and unaccompanied "Ki-Yi Bossie", in which "a 12-step meeting under harsh fluorescent light" occasions a wry round of soul-searching, no wide-open spaces required." PopMatters writer Chris Ingalls wrote that Weir had " never sounded better than when singing top-shelf material like "Whatever Happened to Rose"". Andy Gill, writing for The Independent, wrote that "The widescreen south-western ambience is stippled with intriguing touches, like the shruti box and bowed guitar droning through "Gallop on the Run", and the rhythmic rattling chains of the death ballad "Lay My Lily Down"; though the most moving performance is Weir's plaintive solo piece "Ki-Yi Bossie", oozing empathy for a reluctant penitent alcoholic."

Not all reviews were positive; Boston Globe critic Matthew Gilbert wrote that "the manufactured atmosphere ultimately distances the listener. With a few exceptions, including the song "Blue Mountain", the production also fails to find the best way to deploy Weir's voice, holding it too far back in the mix."

== Track listing ==
| No. | Title | Lyrics | Music | Length |
|---|---|---|---|---|
| 1. | "Only a River" | Josh Ritter | Ritter, Bob Weir, Josh Kaufman | 5:28 |
| 2. | "Cottonwood Lullaby" | Ritter | Kaufman, Weir, Ritter | 3:40 |
| 3. | "Gonesville" | Ritter | Ritter, Weir, Kaufman | 4:09 |
| 4. | "Lay My Lily Down" | Weir, Kaufman, Ritter | Weir, Kaufman, Ritter | 3:57 |
| 5. | "Gallop on the Run" | Weir, Kaufman, Ritter | Weir, Kaufman, Ritter | 4:35 |
| 6. | "Whatever Happened to Rose" | Ritter | Ritter, Weir, Kaufman | 4:19 |
| 7. | "Ghost Towns" | Ritter | Weir, Kaufman, Ritter | 4:55 |
| 8. | "Darkest Hour" | Ritter, Weir, Kaufman | Kaufman, Ritter, Weir | 3:24 |
| 9. | "Ki-Yi Bossie" | Weir, A.J. Santella | Weir, Kaufman, Ritter | 4:46 |
| 10. | "Storm Country" | Ritter | Kaufman, Weir, Ritter | 4:31 |
| 11. | "Blue Mountain" | Weir, Ritter, Kaufman | Weir, Ritter, Kaufman | 3:54 |
| 12. | "One More River to Cross" | Ritter | Weir, Kaufman, Ritter | 4:05 |
| Total length: | | | | 51:43 |

== Personnel ==
Musicians

- Bob Weir – vocals, acoustic guitar
- The Bandana Splits (Lauren Balthrop, Dawn Landes, Annie Nero) – vocals
- Rob Burger – Hammond organ, orchestron, omnichord, vibraphone, accordion
- Sam Cohen – electric guitar, pedal steel, vocals
- Aaron Dessner – electric guitar, high-strung guitar, bowed guitar
- Bryce Dessner – electric guitar
- Scott Devendorf – electric bass, vocals
- Conrad Doucette – tambourine, vocals
- Ramblin' Jack Elliott & the Ramblin' Jackernacle Choir – vocals, yodels, hollers
- Dan Goodwin – vocals
- Josh Kaufman – electric guitar, acoustic guitar, nylon string guitar, high strung guitar, baritone guitar, pedal steel, electric mandolin, tenor banjo, bass, piano, Wurlitzer electric piano, Casio, synths, organ, Farfisa organ, organ bass, drums, vocals
- Steve Kimock – lap steel
- Jay Lane – drums, percussion, vocals
- Nate Martinez – electric guitar, acoustic guitar, shruti box, vocals
- Annie Nero – vocals
- Ray Rizzo – drums, percussion, harmonica, shruti box, vocals
- Joe Russo – drums, percussion
- Jon Shaw – upright bass, piano, vocals
- Robin Sylvester – electric bass, upright bass, Hammond organ, vocals

Production

- Josh Kaufman – producer
- Bob Weir – producer
- Bernie Cahill – executive producer
- Matt Busch – executive producer
- D. James Goodwin – mixing
- Greg Calbi – mastering
- Steve Fallone – mastering

== Charts ==
| Chart (2016) | Peak position |
|---|---|
| Scottish Albums (Official Charts) | 87 |
| US Billboard 200 | 14 |
