= Gonesville =

Single by Bob Weir

from the album Blue Mountain
- Released: September 8, 2016
- Recorded: 2015
- Length: 4:09
- Label: Legacy/Columbia
- Songwriter(s): Bob Weir, Josh Ritter
- Producer(s): Bob Weir, Josh Kaufman, Dan Goodwin

"Gonesville" is a song by Bob Weir, which is the second single from his third solo album, Blue Mountain. Written by Weir in collaboration with members of The National; Josh Ritter, Josh Kaufman, Scott Devendorf, Joe Russo, and The Walkmen's Walter Martin, along with lyricists Gerrit Graham and John Perry Barlow. The producers are Josh Kaufman and Daniel Goodwin.

"Gonesville" premiered on Rolling Stone's website for streaming. "Gonesville," is a bouncy, sing-along track that was co-written by Josh Ritter.

Elias Leight, from Rolling Stone, described the song as "Weir and his band shambling cheerfully here: The bass line hints at the verve of honky tonk, the harmonica scoots forward and the lead guitar spits lively licks. A raft of backing vocalists join in during the chorus, adding to the cool, festive air, and "Gonesville" comes to a close with a jaunty group chant."

Speaking about the inspiration for song, Weir described the song as "being a take on a Rockabilly tune. I was trying to go back and channel Elvis for the vocal, and for the music as well."

== Musicians ==
- Bob Weir – Vocals, Guitar
- Aaron Dessner – Electric Guitar
- Scott Devendorf – Bass, Vocals
- Joe Russo – drums, harmonium, harmonica, backup vocals
- Josh Kaufman – lyrics
- Rob Burger – keyboard, accordion, tuned percussion
