= Live in Colorado =

Live album by Bobby Weir & Wolf Bros
- Released: February 18, 2022
- Recorded: June 8–12, 2021
- Venue: Red Rocks Amphitheatre; Gerald R. Ford Amphitheatre
- Genre: Rock, Americana
- Length: 79:47
- Label: Third Man
- Producer: Bobby Weir, Don Was, Jay Lane

Bob Weir chronology
Blue Mountain (2016)	Live in Colorado (2022)	Live in Colorado Vol. 2 (2022)

Live in Colorado is an album by Bobby Weir & Wolf Bros. It was recorded at Red Rocks Amphitheatre in Morrison, Colorado on June 8 and 9, 2021, and at the Gerald R. Ford Amphitheatre in Vail, Colorado on June 11 and 12, 2021. It was released as a CD and as a two-disc LP on February 18, 2022.

== Critical reception ==
On Pitchfork Jonathan Willinger said, "There have been previous stints where Weir assumed center stage, rather than looking for someone to fill the space left by Garcia, but Wolf Bros have lasted long enough to establish its own rugged and spacious approach to the music. It feels like a tacit acknowledgement of the need to move on, implying that if Weir is to fully embody the legacy he helped build, part of that is finding other ways to live inside it."

In Glide Magazine Dave Goodwich wrote, "Wolf Bros have gone on to perform nearly eighty shows and have seen their catalog rapidly grow as they continually find ways to reinvent the timeless material of the Grateful Dead in a unique stripped-down fashion that offers up a welcome counterpoint to the bells and whistles that accompany Weir's main project, Dead & Company.... While their laid back style may not be for everyone, Wolf Bros has already proven to be a formidable addition to the Grateful Dead family."

== Track listing ==
1. "New Speedway Boogie" (Jerry Garcia, Robert Hunter) – 10:27
2. "A Hard Rain's a-Gonna Fall" (Bob Dylan) – 9:45
3. "Big River" (Johnny Cash) – 6:45
4. "West L.A. Fadeaway" (Garcia, Hunter) – 12:44
5. "My Brother Esau" (Bob Weir, John Barlow) – 5:40
6. "Only a River" (Weir, Josh Ritter, Josh Kaufman) – 6:43
7. "Looks Like Rain" (Weir, Barlow) – 9:53
8. "Lost Sailor" / "Saint of Circumstance" (Weir, Barlow) – 17:49

== Personnel ==
Bobby Weir & Wolf Bros

- Bobby Weir – guitar, vocals
- Don Was – double bass
- Jay Lane – drums
- Jeff Chimenti – piano
- Greg Leisz – pedal steel guitar

The Wolfpack

- Sheldon Brown – tenor saxophone
- Alex Kelly – cello
- Brian Switzer – trumpet
- Adam Theis – trombone
- Mads Tolling – violin

Production

- Produced by Bobby Weir, Don Was, Jay Lane
- Executive producers: Bernie Cahill, Matt Busch
- Recording engineers: Derek Featherstone, Michal Kacunel, Vadim Canby
- Mixing: Derek Feathersone, Chenao Wang
- Mastering: Warren DeFever
- Design, layout: Darryl Norsen
- Photography: Chris Phelps, Dave Vann

== Charts ==
Chart performance for Live in Colorado
Chart (2022)	Peak position
US Billboard 200	179
US Independent Albums (Billboard)	21
US Top Rock Albums (Billboard)	31
