= Lay My Lily Down =

Single by Bob Weir

from the album Blue Mountain
- Released: September 12, 2016
- Recorded: Spring/Fall 2015
- Genre: Country rock, Rock
- Length: 3:57
- Label: Legacy/Columbia
- Songwriters: Bob Weir, Josh Ritter, Josh Kaufman
- Producers: Bob Weir, Josh Kaufman, Dan Goodwin

"Lay My Lily Down" is a song written by Bob Weir, Josh Kaufman and Josh Ritter. It is the third single from Weir's third solo album, Blue Mountain. The producers are Josh Kaufman and Daniel Goodwin.

On September 12, 2016, the song had its premiere on NPR's World Cafe for streaming.

Weir wrote the song with Ritter and Kaufman, with lyrics in the voice of a father as he buries his daughter, over a mix of guitars. Weir described the song as the "brainchild of Josh Kaufman", incorporating the folksong "Lay My Corey Down". Weir tried to make the song "banjo-oriented", using the clawhammer banjo technique for his guitar playing.

== Musicians ==
- Bob Weir – Vocals, Guitar
- Aaron Dessner – Electric Guitar
- Scott Devendorf – Bass, Vocals
- Ray Rizzo – drums, harmonium, harmonica, backup vocals
- Josh Kaufman – lyrics
- Rob Burger – keyboard, accordion, tuned percussion
