= Full of Smoke =

"Full Of Smoke"

Single by Christión

from the album Ghetto Cyrano
- Released: April 1997
- Genre: R&B
- Length: 4:49
- Label: Roc-A-Fella; Def Jam
- Songwriter(s): Poetry Man
- Producer(s): Damon Dash; Jay-Z; Kareem Burke

Christión singles chronology
"Full Of Smoke" (1997)	"I Wanna Get Next To You" (1998)

"Full Of Smoke" is a song by American R&B duo Christión. It was released as the first single of their debut studio album Ghetto Cyrano, with the record labels Roc-A-Fella Records and Def Jam Recordings. The song peaked at number 53 on the Billboard Hot 100, their highest charting single to date.

== Track listing ==
- 12" single

Side A

1. Full Of Smoke (Radio Edit) — 3:33
2. Full Of Smoke (Instrumental) — 3:50

Side B

1. Aftermath (LP Version) — 3:55
2. Full Of Smoke (LP Version) — 3:50
3. Full Of Smoke (Acappella) — 3:50

== Charts ==
Chart (1997)	Peak position
US Billboard Hot 100	53
US Hot R&B/Hip-Hop Songs (Billboard)	15
