= The Uptones =

American ska band

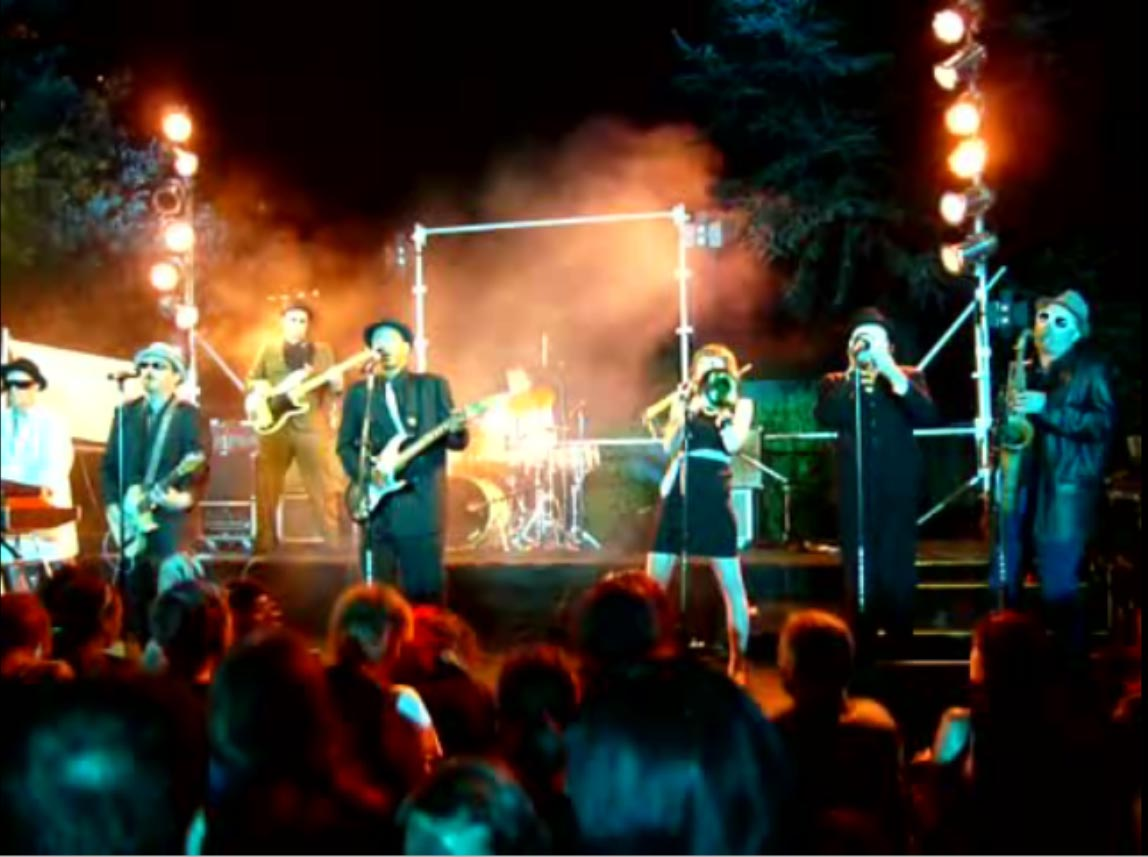
- The Uptones, reunited in 2007

Background information
- Origin: Berkeley, California, USA
- Genres: Ska
- Years active: 1981-1989, 2002-present
- Labels: Fun Fun Fun Recordings (present); Son of Beserkley (1995); 415 Records (1984); Liberation Hall (2020); Berkeley Cat Records (2019)
- Members: Eric Din; Paul Jackson; Ben Eastwood; Adam Beach; Mike Stevens; Jeanne Geiger; Jay Sanders
- Past members: Scott Jensen, Charles Stella, Erik Rader, Michael Wadman, Thomas White, Tim Carter, Musashi (Moose) Lethridge, Emily Jayne, John Mader, Jay Lane, Kenny Brooks, Dave Ellis, Joshua Redman, Josh Miller, Greg Blanch, Ricky Alexander, Brent Bergman, Scott Bertrand
- Website: Official Web site

The Uptones are an American ska band, based in Northern California. Formed in 1981 by a group of high school students in Berkeley, California, The Uptones were influenced by the English 2 Tone sound, as well as the British mod scene, punk rock, and the original Jamaica ska sound. The Uptones were one of the first U.S. bands devoted to playing ska and were an influence on the burgeoning West Coast punk/ska scene. The band reformed with core founding members in the early 2000s and continued to play live shows throughout the Bay Area until 2018.

== History ==
=== Formation ===
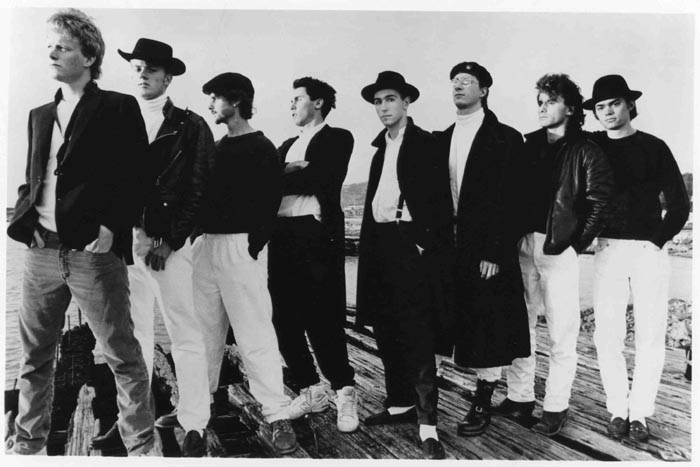
The Uptones in 1986

The Uptones were formed by nine high-school students in 1981, and they started writing songs and playing live shows the same year. Band members Eric Din, Paul Jackson, Ben Eastwood, Erik Rader and Charles Stella were attending Berkeley High School and Cazadero Performing Arts Camp at the time. They had been inspired to start a ska band after attending an English Beat show in San Francisco. According to Din, another main influence was the documentary Dance Craze, “...basically a bunch of concert footage of the English two-tone bands.”

Writing original songs throughout the Reagan era, The Uptones were a dance band with a political bent, covering topics such as the Cold War and the increased militarization of the U.S.

=== Live Shows ===
One of their first public gigs in 1981 was at Barrington Hall in Berkeley with MDC headlining. The Uptones, consisting entirely of 15- and 16-year-olds, would continue to play sold-out shows throughout the San Francisco Bay Area for the next seven years. East Bay venues included The Keystone Berkeley, Berkeley Square, and Ruthie's Inn. San Francisco gigs took place at the On Broadway, The Farm, the Old Waldorf, The Stone, the Kabuki, and Wolfgang's, which sold out to large audiences consisting mainly of high school students.

Rock promoter Bill Graham took note and started booking the band as support for major acts such as the Go-Go's and UB40 at the Greek Theater in Berkeley; X, Madness and the English Beat at the Kabuki; Oingo Boingo at the Warfield; General Public at the Henry J. Kaiser Center; and Billy Idol at the Oakland Coliseum. The Uptones have also played numerous shows with Los Angeles bands Fishbone and The Untouchables.

=== Influence ===
Despite starting out in their teens and breaking up before they could record a substantial discography, The Uptones were highly influential players in the early 1980s underground music scene. Joe Marchese of The Second Disc calls them a "leading light of the mid-’80s ska eruption." Citing an enormous impact on the West Coast ska scene, Marchese writes, "They bridged the era of the Specials and Madness with the era of Green Day, Sublime, and Rancid." Rancid included their cover of Uptones' song "Get Out of My Way" on their 1993 self-titled album.

Jesse Michaels of Operation Ivy has cited the Uptones as a key influence. His bandmates Tim Armstrong and Matt Freeman were also influenced by the Uptones, having opened for them in their earlier band, Basic Radio. Michaels describes the Uptones' place in the underground Berkeley ska scene in an interview:

"There was a ska scene in Berkeley that most people don't know about, in the mid-80s... There was this great band called the Uptones that would get on stage [and do] the whole 2-Tone thing...and they looked and played like a punk band, really dynamic and exciting. People would be stage diving and going crazy at their shows."

== Reformation ==
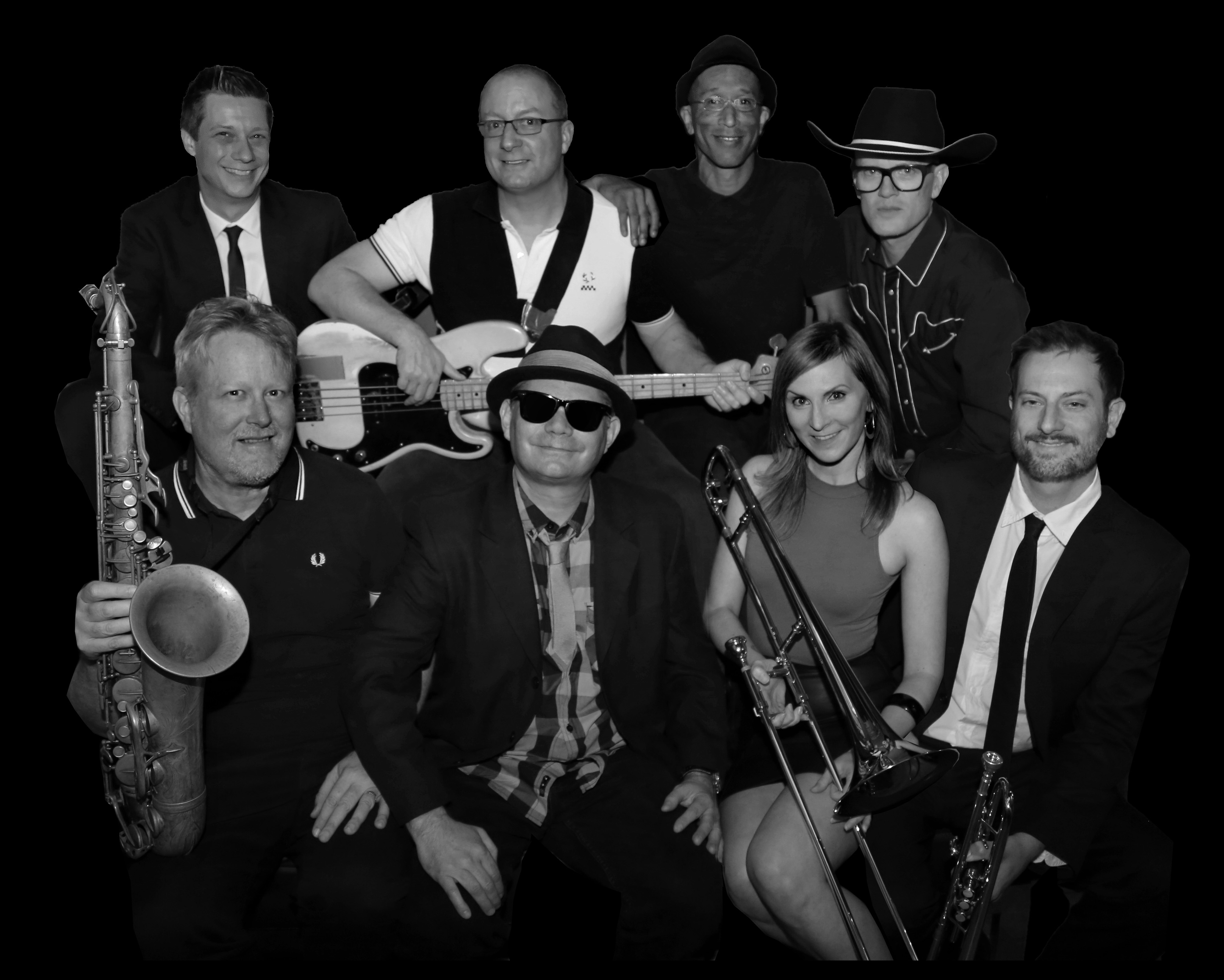
The Uptones in 2017

Despite critical acclaim and a devoted following, after seven years the band went their separate ways. Their recording output had been minimal, and they were mostly known by word-of-mouth from their live shows. Original band members Din, Jackson and Eastwood went on to form new rock bands, first Hobo and then Stiff Richards, playing a combination of alt-rock, ska and reggae, though Din would always consider The Uptones his main band. Subsequently, The Uptones reunited 2002. According to Din, the other bands "were just keeping the heart of the Uptones alive."

The new line-up included original members singer/guitarist Din, singer/keyboardist Jackson, bass-player Eastwood and saxophonist Adam Beach, along with new members Musashi (Moose) Lethridge on guitar, Mike Stevens on drums, and a horn section featuring Jeanne Geiger on trombone and Scott Bertrand on trumpet. The band currently plays live shows throughout the Bay Area and was featured in a cover story in the San Francisco Chronicle Datebook in March, 2008.

In 2008, the Uptones recorded a new CD, Skankin' Foolz Unite! with producers Matthew King Kaufman and Michael Rosen for the Fun Fun Fun Recordings label.

Guitarist Moose Lethridge left The Uptones to join the English Beat in 2010. He was replaced by singer/guitarist Emily Jayne. In 2013, Lethridge rejoined The Uptones, and in 2018 he left again.

In June 2010, the Uptones played four California dates on The Warped Tour.

On November 5, 2017, The Uptones played a benefit concert at the Ashkenaz in Berkeley to raise money for the Northern California fire relief effort. This was their first show since December 2013.

In 2019 Berkeley Cat Records released a digital reissue of the OUTBACK six-song EP, including the original version of Burning Sky which had been a hit on KITS "Live 105" commercial alternative radio in San Francisco in 1987 and remained in rotation through the 1990s.

In 2020, Liberation Hall Records released The Uptones' "Get Out of My Way, the early recordings" CD, along with 415 Records: Still Disturbing The Peace, a compilation of bands originally on the roster of Howie Klein's 415 label. The compilation includes music from Uptones contemporaries of the 1970s/80s Bay Area punk and new-wave music scene, including The Nuns, The Mutants, Pop-O-Pies, and SVT.

In 2024, Berkeley Cat Records released a live UpTones recording from November, 1986 at the Rheem Theater in Moraga, California.

== Critical acclaim ==
Allmusic praises the Uptones for being ahead of the mid-1980s Third wave ska movement:

"Their impact upon the evolving ska scene was enormous ... With a musical maturity far beyond their years and a groundbreaking third wave sound ... the Uptones knocked out high-energy songs quite removed from anything or anyone else ... Light years ahead of their time, the Uptones were a pivotal band and a seminal one."

The review notes the Uptones' rabid hometown following and strong influence on later ska practitioners.

San Francisco Chronicle music critic Joel Selvin wrote of the Uptones in San Francisco Chronicle's list of top 100 Bay Area bands:

"Along with Operation Ivy, the Uptones formed the core of the Berkeley ska-punk scene that paved the way for the likes of Rancid. A hard-edged, upbeat band that would have been huge if it hadn't been years ahead of its time."

The discovery of a DAT tape of a 924 Gilman Street show led to the release of the album The Uptones Live!! 924 Gilman in 1995. Crawdaddy! called it "the best live ska record ever."

== Discography ==
- Live at the Rheem Theater, 1986 Berkeley Cat Records, 2024
- Get Out Of My Way, the early recordings Liberation Hall, 2020
- 415 Records: Still Disturbing The Peace Liberation Hall, 2020 (compilation/415 reissue)
- East Bay Orbits, Fun Fun Fun Recordings, 2010
- Skankin' Foolz Unite!, Fun Fun Fun Recordings, 2008
- The Uptones Live!! 924 Gilman, Son of Beserkley, 1995
- Burning Sky b/w Outback 45 rpm 7-inch single, Beserkley Records UK, 1987
- Outback 6-song EP, 1986 (reissued digitally on Berkeley Cat Records in 2019)
- KUSA, 415 Records, 1985
