= 5 Gallons of Diesel =

Video by Les Claypool
- Released: November 15, 2005
- Recorded: 1994–2005
- Genre: Alternative rock
- Length: 202:02
- Label: Prawn Song Records
- Producers: Jesse Rice and David Lefkowitz

Les Claypool chronology
5 Gallons of Diesel (2005)	Fancy (2007)

5 Gallons of Diesel is a retrospective music DVD featuring Les Claypool and his various side projects. Released on November 15, 2005 by Prawn Song Records, the DVD contains 3.5 hours of music videos, live performances, and other miscellaneous video material pertaining to Claypool and his music.

== Track listing ==
Sausage
No.	Title	Live Performance Information	Length
1.	"Riddles are Abound Tonight" (video)		3:51
2.	"The Making of Riddles"		8:42
3.	"Prelude to Fear" (live)	The Fillmore, San Francisco, California (1994-10-15)	3:59

Holy Mackerel
No.	Title	Live Performance Information	Length
4.	"Hendershot" (live)	CityWalk, Universal City, California (1996-10-06)	3:01

Oysterhead
No.	Title	Live Performance Information	Length
5.	"Shadow of a Man" (live)	Hollywood Palladium, Los Angeles, California (2001-10-21)	7:59

Frog Brigade
No.	Title	Live Performance Information	Length
6.	"Here's to the Man" (live)	Great American Music Hall, San Francisco, California (2000-10-09)	8:11
7.	"Running the Gauntlet" (live)	Great American Music Hall, San Francisco, California (2000-10-09)	8:16
8.	"David Makalaster" (live)	Bonnaroo Festival, Manchester, Tennessee (2002-06-21)	11:05
9.	"Long in the Tooth" (live)	Bonnaroo Festival, Manchester, Tennessee (2002-06-21)	5:05
10.	"Whamola" (live)	Bonnaroo Festival, Manchester, Tennessee (2002-06-21)	5:13
11.	"Granny's Little Yard Gnome" (live)	High Sierra Music Festival, Quincy, California (2003-07-06)	4:14
12.	"Ding Dang" (live)	Jam Cruise 3 (2005-01-08)	15:16
13.	"Buzzards of Green Hill" (live; with Jimmy Herring)	Jam Cruise 3 (2005-01-08)	10:35

Colonel Claypool's Bucket of Bernie Brains
No.	Title	Live Performance Information	Length
14.	"Opening Jam" (live)	Great American Music Hall, San Francisco, California (2002-06-16)	11:56
15.	"Encore Jam" (live)	Great American Music Hall, San Francisco, California (2002-06-16)	9:23
16.	"Tyranny of the Hunt" (live)	Roxy Theater, Boston, Massachusetts (2004-09-29)	8:39
17.	"Scott Taylor" (live)	Roxy Theater, Boston, Massachusetts (2004-09-29)	7:25

Les Claypool
No.	Title	Live Performance Information	Length
18.	"Riddles are Abound Tonight" (live)	The Vic Theatre, Chicago, Illinois (2005-07-22)	8:19
19.	"The Awakening" (live)	The Vic Theatre, Chicago, Illinois (2005-07-22)	2:30
Total length:			144:31

=== Extras ===
No.	Title	Live Performance Information	Length
20.	"3 Guys Named Schmo" (live; performed by Les Claypool, Jay Lane, and Rob Wasserman)	Bill Graham Civic Auditorium, San Francisco, California (1994 Bammies)	5:24
21.	"Buzzards of Green Hill" (video)		4:06
22.	"The Making of Buzzards"		1:45
23.	"The Recording of Buzzards" (with Warren Haynes)		8:17
24.	"Fly Fishing the World" (2004 Idaho)		18:26
25.	"Fly Fishing the World" (2005 Northern Quebec, Canada)		19:29
Total length:			57:31
