= Bing, Bing, Bing! =

Studio album by Charlie Hunter
- Released: June 20, 1995
- Genre: Jazz, acid jazz, jazz rock
- Length: 56:19
- Label: Blue Note
- Producer: Lee Townsend

Charlie Hunter chronology
Charlie Hunter Trio (1993)	Bing, Bing, Bing! (1995)

Professional ratings
Review scores
Source	Rating
AllMusic	4/5 stars
The Penguin Guide to Jazz Recordings	3/4 stars

Bing, Bing, Bing! is a 1995 album by jazz guitarist Charlie Hunter. This was his first album for the Blue Note Records and features his eight-string guitar.

The cover is a homage to Horace Parlan's 1960 album, Speakin' My Piece. The neon sign, 500 Club, is a bar in San Francisco's Mission District, a few blocks from the Elbo Room nightclub where the trio made a name for themselves.

== Track listing ==
1. "Greasy Granny" – 4:34
2. "Wornell's Yorkies" – 3:58
3. "Fistful of Haggis" – 6:44
4. "Come as You Are" (Cobain) – 6:08
5. "Scrabbling for Purchase" – 4:49
6. "Bullethead" – 5:34
7. "Bing, Bing, Bing, Bing!" – 7:56
8. "Squiddlesticks" – 4:03
9. "Lazy Susan (with a client now)" – 6:15
10. "Elbo Room" – 5:58

== Personnel ==
- Charlie Hunter – eight-string guitar
- Dave Ellis – tenor saxophone
- Jay Lane – drums
- Jeff Cressman – trombone on tracks 5 and 9
- Ben Goldberg – clarinet on tracks 5 and 9
- David Phillips – pedal steel guitar on tracks 3 and 7
- Scott Roberts – percussion on tracks 2 and 3

Production

- Lee Townsend – producer
- Judy Clapp – mixing engineer
- Oliver DiCicco – engineer
- Christian Jones – engineer
- Greg Calbi – mastering
