= Live Frogs Set 1 =

Live album by Colonel Les Claypool's Fearless Flying Frog Brigade
- Released: April 10, 2001
- Recorded: October 8–9, 2000
- Genres: Experimental rock, progressive rock
- Length: 66:30
- Label: Prawn Song Records

Colonel Les Claypool's Fearless Flying Frog Brigade chronology
Live Frogs Set 1 (2001)	Live Frogs Set 2 (2001)

Professional ratings
Review scores
Source	Rating
AllMusic	4/5 stars

Live Frogs Set 1 is a live album by Colonel Les Claypool's Fearless Flying Frog Brigade, released by Prawn Song Records on 10 April 2001. It is composed of songs recorded during the 8–9 October 2000 shows the Frog Brigade played at the Great American Music Hall in San Francisco, the second part released as Live Frogs Set 2. It is primarily composed of originals by the various side projects of Claypool and his fellow band members but also includes two cover songs.

The band features Les Claypool, original Primus (and later, Sausage) members Todd Huth and Jay Lane, Jeff Chimenti on keyboards, Eenor on guitar, and saxophonist Skerik. The seven song set features covers of King Crimson's "Thela Hun Ginjeet" and Pink Floyd's "Shine On You Crazy Diamond".

The album won the Best Live Album award at the Second Annual Jammy Awards show in 2001.

== Track listing ==
1. "Thela Hun Ginjeet" (Adrian Belew, Bill Bruford, Robert Fripp, Tony Levin) – 14:25
2. "Riddles Are Abound Tonight" (Les Claypool/Sausage) – 5:58
3. "Hendershot" (Claypool) – 6:45
4. "Shattering Song" (Claypool/Sausage) – 11:54
5. "Running the Gauntlet" (Claypool) – 7:41
6. "Girls for Single Men" (Claypool/Sausage) – 7:41
7. "Shine On You Crazy Diamond (Jack Irons version)" (David Gilmour, Roger Waters, Richard Wright) – 12:08

== Chart performance ==
=== Album ===
Chart	Provider(s)	Peak position	Certification	Sales/ shipments
Billboard Independent Albums (U.S.)	Billboard	34	Not certified	N/A

== Personnel ==
(as they appear in the liner notes)

- Todd Paclebar Huth — guitar, vocals
- Eenor Wildeboar — guitar, cümbüş (Jim Bush), vocals
- Jeff Chimenti — keyboard, vocals
- Jay "Rhino Boy" Lane — drums, vocals
- Skerik (represented by Marvin Pickles who sniffed jury's underpants) — saxophone
- Les Claypool — bass, vocals
