= Charlie Hunter Trio (album) =

Studio album by Charlie Hunter
- Released: December 8, 1993
- Recorded: May 9 – 26, 1993
- Studio: The Corn Studios
- Genre: Jazz fusion, acid jazz, jazz rock
- Length: 48:17
- Label: Mammoth/Prawn Song
- Producer: Les Claypool

Charlie Hunter chronology
| Charlie Hunter Trio (1993) | Bing, Bing, Bing! (1995) |

Professional ratings
Review scores
| Source | Rating |
|---|---|
| AllMusic | 4/5 stars |
| The Encyclopedia of Popular Music | 3/5 stars |

Charlie Hunter Trio is the debut album by jazz guitarist Charlie Hunter. It was released by Prawn Song Records, a label owned by Les Claypool. Claypool produced the album, and his former bandmate, Jay Lane, played drums. Dave Ellis joined in on saxophone. Hunter played a seven-string guitar.

== Production ==
The album was recorded by Claypool for one hundred dollars.

== Critical reception ==
AllMusic wrote that "the trio provides an interesting, yet accessible, groove-driven, funky, improvised jam for a new generation of jazz fans." Trouser Press wrote: "Though deceptively clean, its diffuse, fusiony compositions don’t fully convey the group’s sass and spirit — only 'Dance of the Jazz Fascists' ... comes close."

== Track listing ==
All tracks are written by Charlie Hunter except where noted.

| No. | Title | Length |
|---|---|---|
| 1. | "Fred's Life" | 4:30 |
| 2. | "Live Oak" (Hunter/Calder Spanier) | 4:17 |
| 3. | "20, 30, 40, 50, 60, Dead" | 5:57 |
| 4. | "Funky Niblets" | 6:05 |
| 5. | "Fables of Faubus" (Charles Mingus) | 1:49 |
| 6. | "Dance of the Jazz Fascists" (Dave Ellis/Hunter/Jay Lane) | 6:34 |
| 7. | "The Telephone's a Ringin'" | 6:53 |
| 8. | "Rhythm Comes in 12 Tones" | 2:55 |
| 9. | "Mule" | 3:17 |
| 10. | "Faffer Time" (Hunter/Ellis/Lane) | 6:04 |

== Personnel ==
- Charlie Hunter – seven-string guitar
- Scott Jensen – trumpet
- Dave Ellis – tenor saxophone
- Miles Perkins – double bass
- Jay Lane – drums
- Scott Roberts – congas
- Andre Marshall – bells, cow bell
