= Live in Colorado Vol. 2 =

Live album by Bobby Weir & Wolf Bros
- Released: October 7, 2022
- Recorded: June 8–12, 2021
- Venue: Red Rocks Amphitheatre; Gerald R. Ford Amphitheatre
- Genre: Rock; Americana
- Length: 75:43
- Label: Third Man
- Producer: Bobby Weir; Don Was; Jay Lane

Bob Weir chronology
Live in Colorado (2022)	Live in Colorado Vol. 2 (2022)

Live in Colorado Vol. 2 is an album by Bobby Weir & Wolf Bros. Like its predecessor Live in Colorado, it was recorded at Red Rocks Amphitheatre in Morrison, Colorado on June 8 and 9, 2021, and at the Gerald R. Ford Amphitheatre in Vail, Colorado on June 11 and 12, 2021. It was released as a CD and as a two-disc LP on October 7, 2022.

Wolf Bros formed in 2018 as a trio, with Bob Weir on guitar and vocals, Don Was on double bass, and Jay Lane on drums. In 2021 they added Jeff Chimenti on keyboards. In June of that year they played four shows in Colorado with Greg Leisz on pedal steel guitar and a horn and string section called the Wolfpack. Songs selected from those concerts comprise the albums Live in Colorado and Live in Colorado Vol. 2.

== Critical reception ==
On Pitchfork Marty Sartini Garner said, "For Weir, [Grateful Dead songs] should be played slowly, with purpose and focus, 'an audio playlet that needed to sink into the audience's mind', as writer Joel Selvin puts it.... Weir's arrangements expand these songs outward, their scope and sense of majesty evoked by the horns, strings, and pedal steel of the accompanying Wolfpack ensemble.... Much of the album's grace is owing to the pleasant contrast between Weir's late style as a rhythm guitarist and the slickness of the band."

In American Songwriter Lee Zimmerman wrote, "A five-piece brass and violin section add a sophisticated sound and underpin the jazz-like flourishes, all of which are immaculately rendered even while staying true to the ambitious execution of the originals. In that regard, Weir and the Wolfs manage to stay true to the template while also taking the music beyond any original incarnation by reinventing them in ways that find imagination and intrigue well stirred in a contemporary context."

On AllMusic Fred Thomas said, "Weir's pleasantly laconic vocals set a lazy, drifting mood, but the inclusion of tight horn parts on familiar Dead tunes like "Ripple" or "Eyes of the World" add a new sparkle to the rootsy approach the group originally took with these songs in the 1970s.... There's a mix of technical precision and off-the-cuff live looseness throughout, with the ornamentation of unexpected violin, cello, or washes of brass floating over casually delivered, jazzed-up readings of some of the most beloved entries from the Grateful Dead's deep catalog."

== Track listing ==
1. "Mama Tried" (Merle Haggard) – 4:07
2. "Eyes of the World" / "What's Going On" (Jerry Garcia, Robert Hunter / Renaldo Benson, Al Cleveland, Marvin Gaye) – 15:40
3. "Terrapin Station Suite" (Garcia, Hunter) – 20:39
4. "The Other One" (Garcia, Bill Kreutzmann, Phil Lesh, Ron McKernan, Bob Weir, Tom Constanten) – 13:40
5. "Brokedown Palace" (Garcia, Hunter) – 5:35
6. "Days Between" (Garcia, Hunter) – 10:04
7. "Ripple" (Garcia, Hunter) – 5:58

== Personnel ==
Bobby Weir & Wolf Bros

- Bobby Weir – guitar, vocals
- Don Was – double bass
- Jay Lane – drums
- Jeff Chimenti – piano
- Greg Leisz – pedal steel guitar

The Wolfpack

- Sheldon Brown – tenor saxophone
- Alex Kelly – cello
- Brian Switzer – trumpet
- Adam Theis – trombone
- Mads Tolling – violin

Production

- Produced by Bobby Weir, Don Was, Jay Lane
- Executive producers: Bernie Cahill, Matt Busch
- Recording engineers: Derek Featherstone, Michal Kacunel
- Post-production: Vadim Canby
- Mixing: Elliot Scheiner
- Mastering: Warren DeFever
- Design, layout: Darryl Norsen
