= The Other One: The Long Strange Trip of Bob Weir =

The Other One: The Long, Strange Trip of Bob Weir
- The Other One film poster
- Directed by: Mike Fleiss
- Written by: Sam Kropf
- Produced by: Marc Weingarten; Martin Hilton; Justin Kreutzmann; Sam Kropf
- Starring: Trixie Garcia; Phil Lesh; Mickey Hart; Bill Kreutzmann; Mike Gordon; Jorma Kaukonen
- Edited by: Rich Fox
- Production company: Next Entertainment
- Distributed by: Netflix
- Release date: May 22, 2015
- Running time: 85 minutes
- Country: United States
- Language: English

The Other One: The Long, Strange Trip of Bob Weir is a documentary film about Bob Weir, who rose to fame as a guitarist and singer in the rock band the Grateful Dead. It premiered at the Tribeca Film Festival on April 23, 2014. It was distributed through Netflix starting on May 22, 2015. The film runs for an hour and twenty-five minutes.

The film was directed by Mike Fleiss. The film features newly conducted interviews with living band members and friends including Bob Weir and his wife Natascha, Mickey Hart, Bill Kreutzmann, Phil Lesh, and John Perry Barlow, along with other musicians such as Mike Gordon, Perry Farrell, Lee Ranaldo, Jorma Kaukonen, and Sammy Hagar.

Speaking of the film, Mike stated: "We certainly unearthed a lot of buried treasure from the Grateful Dead archive while making this film," said filmmaker, Mike Fleiss. "With Netflix, we have found the perfect global partner to tell the fascinating life story of Bob Weir set against the backdrop of America's greatest rock band.". Fleiss also stated that: “I wanted to give Bob his moment to shine,” Fleiss says. “I wanted to shine a light on his contributions to culture and rock and roll.”

The film won an Audience Award at the 2014 San Francisco International Film Festival for Best Documentary Feature.

Talking about the film, Lisa Nishimura, Netflix VP of Original Documentary and Comedy, said: "Mike Fleiss was given unprecedented access to create an intimate and compelling film about one of the most prolific, respected and beloved musicians of our time" and also stated that "We are proud to bring Bob's story to his fans around the world on the eve of the Dead's final shows at Soldier Field in Chicago."

== Critical reception ==
Reviews for the film were generally positive. Rosy the Reviewer stated that "if you are a Deadhead, you will definitely want to see this film, but if you like documentaries and can't remember the 60s, you will also enjoy this."
