= Highball with the Devil =

1996 album by Les Claypool

Studio album by Les Claypool and the Holy Mackerel
- Released: August 27, 1996
- Recorded: 1996
- Studio: Rancho Relaxo
- Length: 47:05
- Labels: Interscope, Prawn Song
- Producer: Les Claypool

Professional ratings
Review scores
Source	Rating
Allmusic	2.5/5 stars

Highball with the Devil is a studio album by Les Claypool and the Holy Mackerel, released in 1996. "Les Claypool and the Holy Mackerel" is Claypool's first solo effort. In addition to his usual bass guitar and vocals, he also plays most of the drums and some guitar. He also self produced and engineered the album at his own studio, "Rancho Relaxo". Credited musicians include Charlie Hunter on guitar for "Me and Chuck;" Marc "Mirv" Haggard on guitar on songs such as "El Sobrante Fortnight" and "Hendershot," as well as on the saw for "Cohibas Esplenditos"; Adam "Bob Cock" Gates on vocal; Jay Lane on drums; and Henry Rollins narrating "Delicate Tendrils."

The touring band for the album were Claypool, Marc "Mirv" Haggard, Adam Gates, and Bryan "Brain" Mantia. "Brain" Mantia was then a new member of Primus.

== Track listing ==
All songs by Les Claypool unless otherwise noted.

1. "Running the Gauntlet" - 1:35
2. "Holy Mackerel" - 3:48
3. "Highball with the Devil" - 3:58
4. "Hendershot" - 2:22
5. "Calling Kyle" - 3:54
6. "Rancor" - 1:16 (Les Claypool, Andrew Herod)
7. "Cohibas Esplenditos" - 3:10
8. "Delicate Tendrils" - 4:59
9. "The Awakening" (The Reddings cover) - 3:32
10. "Precipitation" - 3:53
11. "George E. Porge" - 2:29
12. "El Sobrante Fortnight" - 3:35
13. "Granny's Little Yard Gnome" - 3:00
14. "Me and Chuck" - 2:59
15. "Carolina Rig" - 3:00

== Chart performance ==
Chart	Provider(s)	Peak position	Certification	Sales/ shipments
Billboard 200 (U.S.)	Billboard	182	Not certified	N/A

== Credits ==
- Les Claypool - guitar (1, 3, 7, 8, 13), bass (all), drums (1, 3–6, 8, 10–13, 15), vocals (1–7, 10–13), string bass (arco) (5, 10, 15), rhythm guitar (11), producer, engineer, cover art
- Joe Gore - guitar (2, 11)
- Mark "Mirv" Haggard - guitar solo (2), guitars (4, 6, 12), electric-bowed backsaw (7)
- Jay Lane - drums (2, 7, 9, 14)
- Adam Gates - additional vocals (3), vocals (10)
- Henry Rollins - narration (8)
- Charlie Hunter - guitar (14)
- Tim Soya - assistant engineer
- Matt Murman - mastering
- Jill Rose - project coordinator
