= Christión =

American production duo

- Origin: San Francisco Bay Area, California, U.S.
- Genres: R&B
- Occupations: Singers; record producers
- Years active: 1996–2005
- Labels: Infrared Music Group; Roc-A-Fella Records; The Mint Records
- Past members: Kenni Ski; Allen Anthony; T. Ross; Maxx Jewelz; Zeek

Christión was an American male R&B and record production duo from San Francisco Bay Area composed of brothers Kenni Ski and Allen Anthony. Briefly signed with Infrared Music Group, they contributed for Mr. Mike, 3X Krazy and Luniz before they released their debut single "Full of Smoke" in late 1996 for Roc-A-Fella Records, which peaked at No. 53 on the Billboard Hot 100 and No. 15 on the R&B Songs chart.

The single's success got the group a deal with Def Jam Recordings, who released their debut studio album Ghetto Cyrano in late 1997. The album peaked at No. 146 on the Billboard 200, No. 23 on the Top R&B/Hip-Hop Albums and No. 4 on the Heatseekers Albums, and scored two more moderate hits on the charts with "Bring Back Your Love" reaching No. 111 on the Billboard Hot 100 and No. 67 on the R&B chart and "I Wanna Get Next to You" reaching No. 86 on the Billboard Hot 100 and No. 32 on the R&B chart. The duo featured on Roc-A-Fella compilations Streets Is Watching Soundtrack and DJ Clue? Presents: Backstage Mixtape (Music Inspired by the Film).

The group rarely contributed to other artists' projects, being featured on The Jacka's and Lil' Al's solo debuts. In 2003, Anthony went solo, maintaining his Roc-A-Fella ties, and appeared on Freeway's single "Alright".

In 2005, Kenni Ski and T. Ross released the second Christión album Project Plato via The Mint Records. The sophomore project features the works of Bikram Singh, Ezra, Robbie Gennet and Trae James.

== Discography ==
=== Studio albums ===
| Title | Album details | Peak chart positions | | |
| Title | Album details | US | US R&B | US Heat. |
|---|---|---|---|---|
| Ghetto Cyrano | Released: 1997; Label: Roc-A-Fella/Def Jam | 146 | 23 | 4 |
| Project Plato | Released: 2005; Label: The Mint Records | — | — | — |

=== Singles ===
as lead artist

| Year | Title | Peak chart positions | |
| Year | Title | US | US R&B |
|---|---|---|---|
| 1997 | "Full of Smoke" | 53 | 15 |
| 1997 | "Bring Back Your Love" | 111 | 67 |
| 1998 | "I Wanna Get Next to You" | 86 | 32 |
| 2005 | "Let 'Em Know/I've Grown" | — | — |

as featured artist

| Year | Title | Peak chart positions | |
| Year | Title | US | US R&B |
|---|---|---|---|
| 1996 | "Where Ya Love At?" (Mr. Mike featuring Christión) | — | 87 |

=== Guest appearances ===
List of non-single guest appearances, with other performing artists, showing year released and album name
| Title | Year | Artist(s) | Album |
|---|---|---|---|
| "Where Ya Love At" | 1996 | Mr. Mike | Wicked Wayz |
| "Tired of the Pain" | 1997 | 3X Krazy | Stackin Chips |
| "20 Bluntz a Day" | 1997 | Luniz | Lunitik Muzik |
| "Pimp This Love" | 1998 | —N/a | Streets Is Watching Soundtrack |
| "Your Love" | 1998 | Jay-Z | Streets Is Watching Soundtrack |
| "Just Leave Your Love" | 2000 | —N/a | DJ Clue? Presents: Backstage Mixtape (Music Inspired by the Film) |
| "Innocent Youth" | 2001 | The Jacka | The Jacka of the Mob Figaz |
| "Hell on Earth" | 2003 | Lil' Al, Harm, Mr. Spence | God Bless the Child That Can Hold His Own |
