= Mads Tolling =

Danish-American violinist, violist, and composer

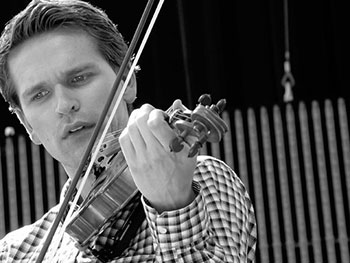
- (2011)

Background information
- Born: July 5, 1980 (age 46); Copenhagen, Denmark
- Genres: Classical, jazz
- Instruments: Violin, viola
- Years active: 2003–present
- Website: madstolling.com/

Mads Tolling (born July 5, 1980) is a Danish-American violinist, violist, composer and two-time Grammy Award-Winner.

As a former member of the Turtle Island Quartet and bassist Stanley Clarke’s band, Tolling is today leading his own projects and bands. He won Grammy Awards for Best Classical Crossover Album as part of Turtle Island Quartet's recordings 4+Four (2006) and A Love Supreme - The Legacy of John Coltrane (2008). He recorded on Stanley Clarke's The Toys of Men (2007). Tolling was nominated for another Grammy in the Classical Compendium Category in 2015 with the album, Mike Marshall & The Turtle Island Quartet. In 2016 he was the winner of the DownBeat Critics Poll Rising Star Violin Award.

Tolling currently focuses on his solo projects, Mads Tolling & The Mads Men and the Mads Tolling Quartet, and he has recorded five albums as a bandleader. He has also received commissions to write and solo with symphony orchestras. He has performed with Chick Corea, Ramsey Lewis, Kenny Barron, Paquito D'Rivera, Leo Kottke and Sergio & Odair Assad.

Born and raised in Copenhagen, Denmark, Tolling relocated to the United States to study at Berklee College of Music where he graduated summa cum laude in 2003. After graduating He received Denmark's Sankt Annae's Award for Musical Excellence as well as grants from Queen Margrethe, the Sonning Foundation and the Berklee Elvin Jones Award. Since graduating from Berklee College of Music, he has toured worldwide with the Stanley Clarke band and Turtle Island Quartet. He has also performed with Al Di Meola, Kenny Barron, Paquito D'Rivera, and Leo Kottke.

== Early life ==
Tolling grew up in Copenhagen, Denmark, and he started playing the violin at age six. He was trained classically, at first using the Suzuki method and later using variety of material. One of his early childhood memories involved busking in the streets of Copenhagen with his sister playing classical pieces and Scandinavian folk songs. Mads attended the musically minded, Sankt Annae High School, and after graduation he received a large scholarship to Berklee College of Music in Boston. At Berklee Tolling studied with JoAnne Brackeen, Hal Crook and Joe Lovano, and he met and jammed with violinist Jean-Luc Ponty, who in turn recommended Mads to join bassist Stanley Clarke's band.

== Career ==
In 2003, Tolling started touring internationally with Stanley Clarke. Performances included The Hollywood Bowl, Ronnie Scott's and The North Sea Jazz Festival. Tolling played in Clarke's band till 2010, and the two musicians have collaborated on three recordings to date.

Tolling joined Turtle Island Quartet in 2003 at first on viola, and in 2008 he switched to play the violin. Tolling's time in the group included much international touring, and the group performed at hundreds of venues around the US, including the Library of Congress and New York's Merkin Hall. As part of the quartet he won two Grammy Awards in the Classical Crossover Category and received an additional nomination in 2015. Tolling ended his time in the group in 2012 to pursue solo projects.

=== Mads Tolling Quartet ===
In 2007, Mads Tolling formed the Mads Tolling Trio and immediately recorded Speed of Light (2008). Six of the 11 tracks are original compositions. The following year, he added a drummer and the group became the Mads Tolling Quartet. He has performed at Yoshi's, Yerba Buena Gardens Festival, San Jose Jazz Festival, Kuumbwa Jazz, Throckmorton Theater and Russian River Jazz Festival. He has performed with The Who in their Moving On Tour in San Francisco on October 9, 2019.

=== The Playmaker ===
Mads Tolling's sophomore CD release The Playmaker features Stanley Clarke, Russell Ferrante, and Stefon Harris. Seven of the 11 tracks are original compositions. Endorsed by both Yamaha Corporation of America and Connolley Music, Inc., Tolling views his instrument as part fiddle, part saxophone, part acoustic and electric violin. The Playmaker is a journey into jazz, fusion, funk, classical, and Danish folk along with rock & roll arrangements of Led Zeppelin's "Black Dog" and Radiohead's "Just." The Playmaker (Madsman Records/City Hall) was released on October 20, 2009.

== Personal life ==
Tolling lives in the San Francisco Bay Area. When he's not performing or practicing, he enjoys golfing, tennis, and hiking.

== Discography ==
- Ann Hampton Callaway – At Last (2009/Telarc)
- Mads Tolling Trio – Speed of Light (2008)
- Sekou Bunch – The Next Level (2008/Trippin N Rhythm)
- Stanley Clarke – Toys of Men (2007/Heads Up)
- Turtle Island Quartet – A Love Supreme – The Legacy of John Coltrane (2007/Telarc)
- Freddy Clarke – Wobbly World (2007/Wobbly World)
- Jessica Fichot – Le Chemin (2007/www.jessicasongs.com)
- Fernando Ortega – The Shadow of your Wings (2006/Curb Records)
- Turtle Island Quartet & Ying Quartet – 4+Four (2005/Telarc)
- Yotam Rosenbaum & Dave Samuels – Balance (2005/YRM)
- Teena Marie – La Dona (2004/Universal)
- Wolf Bros – Live in Colorado (2022/Third Man)
- Wolf Bros – Live in Colorado Vol. 2 (2022/Third Man)

== Awards and recognition ==
=== Grammy Awards ===
- Turtle Island Quartet: 4+Four (2006)
- Turtle Island Quartet: A Love Supreme - The Legacy of John Coltrane (2008)

=== Other Awards ===
- Winner of DownBeat Magazine's Rising Star Violin Award
- Berklee Elvin Jones Award (2002)
- Sonning Award (2001)
- The Augustinus Foundation, Denmark (2000)
- Queen Margaret Award (2000)
