= Live Frogs Set 2 =

Live album by Colonel Les Claypool's Fearless Flying Frog Brigade
- Released: July 24, 2001
- Recorded: October 8–9, 2000
- Length: 43:03
- Label: Prawn Song Records

Colonel Les Claypool's Fearless Flying Frog Brigade chronology
Live Frogs Set 1 (2001)	Live Frogs Set 2 (2001)	Purple Onion (2002)

Professional ratings
Review scores
Source	Rating
AllMusic	4/5 stars
Rolling Stone	(favorable)

Live Frogs Set 2 is the second set of live recordings by Les Claypool's Frog Brigade, released on July 24, 2001. The album is a complete performance of the Pink Floyd studio album Animals. It is introduced at the end of Live Frogs Set 1 as "more Pink Floyd than any human being should ever withstand", as the band's version of "Shine On You Crazy Diamond" comes to an end.

== Track listing ==
All songs were written by Roger Waters, unless otherwise noted.

1. "Pigs on the Wing 1" – 1:59
2. "Dogs" (Waters/Gilmour) – 16:11
3. "Pigs (Three Different Ones)" – 11:14
4. "Sheep" – 11:13
5. "Pigs on the Wing 2" – 1:59

== Personnel ==
(as they appear in the liner notes)

- Todd Paclebar Huth — guitar, vocals
- Eenor — guitar, vocals
- Jeff Chimenti — keyboards, vocals
- Jay "Rhino Boy" Lane — drums, vocals
- Skerik — saxophone
- Les Claypool — bass, vocals

== Chart performance ==
=== Album ===
Chart	Provider(s)	Peak position	Certification	Sales/ shipments
Billboard Independent Albums (U.S.)	Billboard	23	Not certified	N/A
