= Ghetto Cyrano =

Studio album by Christión
- Released: November 4, 1997
- Recorded: 1997
- Genres: R&B; funk; soul
- Length: 64:00
- Labels: Roc-A-Fella; Def Jam
- Producers: Christión; Damon Dash; Jay-Z; Kareem "Biggs" Burke

Christión chronology
Ghetto Cyrano (1997)	Project Plato (2005)

Singles from Ghetto Cyrano
- 1. "Full of Smoke" Released: April 1997; 2. "I Wanna Get Next to You" Released: January 1998

Ghetto Cyrano is the debut studio album by American R&B duo Christión. It was released on November 4, 1997, via Roc-A-Fella Records/Def Jam Recordings. The album was produced by the duo, also serving as executive producers together with Damon Dash, Jay-Z, and Kareem "Biggs" Burke. The album peaked at number 146 on the Billboard 200 and number 23 on the Top R&B/Hip-Hop Albums. It was supported with two singles "Full of Smoke", which peaked at No. 53 on the Billboard Hot 100, and "I Wanna Get Next to You".

== Critical reception ==
Professional ratings
Review scores
Source	Rating
AllMusic	3/5 stars
Los Angeles Times	3/4 stars

The Los Angeles Times wrote: "Its falsettos trembling over pimp-smooth, reclining grooves, this Bay Area duo coos with a cool attitude about affairs on the street corner and in the boudoir."

== Track listing ==
No.	Title	Length
1.	"Intro"	0:29
2.	"The Ghetto (Do What Ya Gotta Do)"	5:38
3.	"Full of Smoke"	4:49
4.	"Pull It"	4:02
5.	"Where I'm From" (Interlude)	1:55
6.	"Where I'm From"	5:23
7.	"Midnight X-Ta-C"	3:45
8.	"Anything Goes"	4:33
9.	"I Wanna Get Next to You"	3:50
10.	"Bring Back Your Love"	5:27
11.	"Face Like Yours"	4:08
12.	"Come to Me"	5:25
13.	"Soon"	4:50
14.	"Tonight"	5:34
15.	"Aftermath"	4:12
Total length:		1:04:00

== Personnel ==
- Allen Anthony – vocals, producer, executive producer
- Kenni Ski – vocals, producer, executive producer
- Herb Powers Jr. – mastering
- Shawn "Jay-Z" Carter – executive producer
- Damon "Dame" Dash – executive producer
- Kareem "Biggs" Burke – executive producer
- Keith Major – photography

== Charts ==
Chart (1997)	Peak position
US Billboard 200	146
US Top R&B/Hip-Hop Albums (Billboard)	23
