= Wolf Bros =

Rock band (2018–2025)

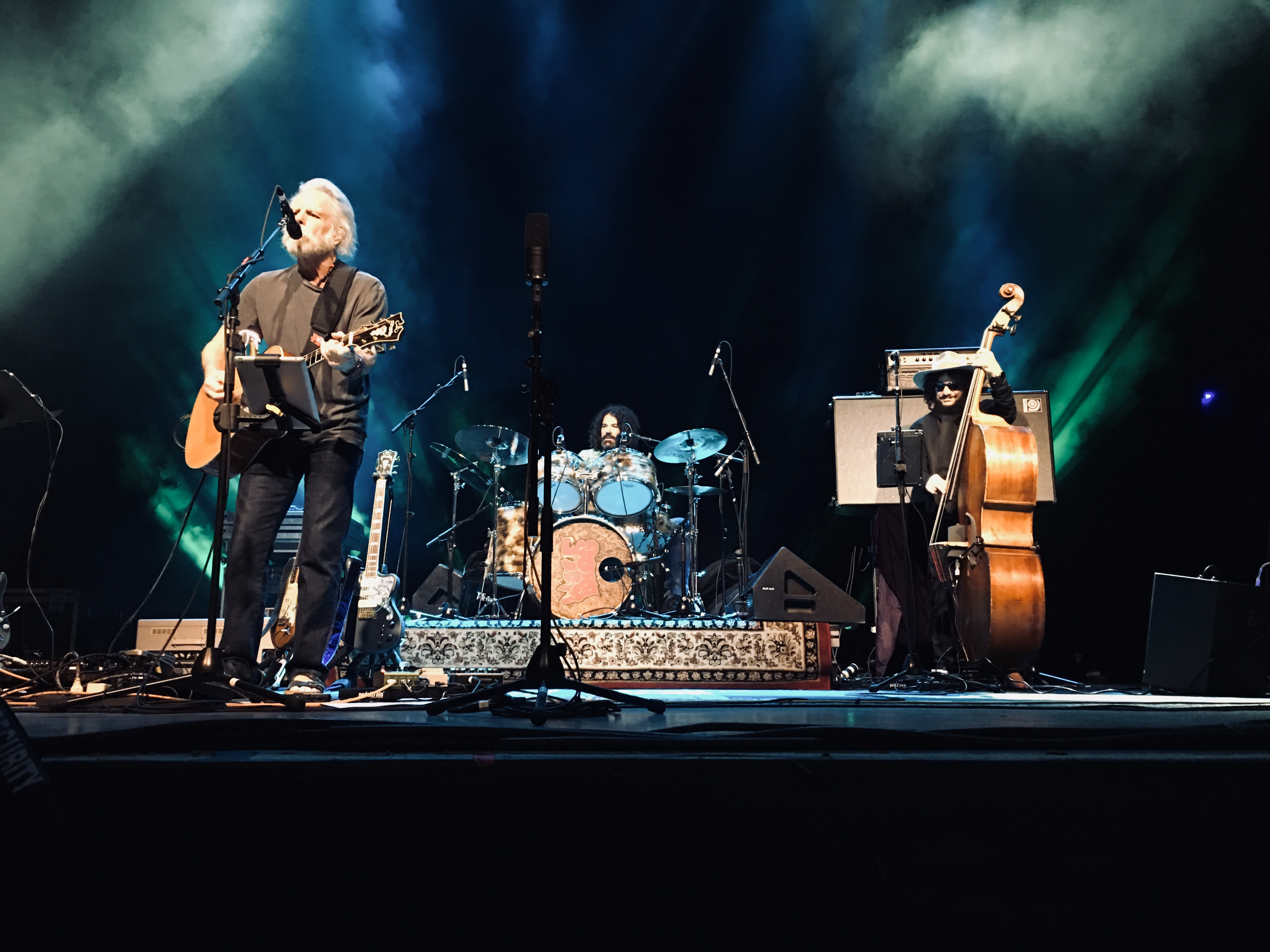
- Wolf Bros at the Pageant in St. Louis on March 21, 2019. Left to right: Bob Weir, Jay Lane, Don Was.

Background information
- Origin: San Francisco Bay Area
- Genres: Rock
- Years active: 2018–2025
- Label: Third Man
- Past members: Bob Weir; Don Was; Jay Lane; Jeff Chimenti
- Website: bobweir.net

Wolf Bros – also known as Bob Weir & Wolf Bros or Bobby Weir & Wolf Bros – was a rock band led by former Grateful Dead guitarist and singer Bob Weir. The band played some Grateful Dead songs along with other roots rock music.

== History ==
Wolf Bros formed in 2018 as a trio, with Bob Weir on guitar and vocals, Don Was on double bass, and Jay Lane on drums. Billed as Bob Weir & Wolf Bros, they toured the U.S. with 19 concerts in the fall of that year. In the spring of 2019, they played another concert tour with 20 more shows. In the spring of 2020, the band began a 22-date tour, which was cancelled partway through due to the COVID-19 pandemic.

On New Year's Eve 2020, Bob Weir & Wolf Bros, with Jeff Chimenti on keyboards and Greg Leisz on pedal steel guitar, livestreamed a concert from TRI Studios. The band played several more shows at TRI Studios in the spring of 2021, with an expanded lineup including Chimenti, Leisz, and a horn and string section called the Wolfpack, with Brian Switzer on trumpet, Adam Theis on tenor trombone, Sheldon Brown on tenor and alto saxophone, clarinet, bass clarinet, flute and bass flute, Mads Tolling on violin, and Alex Kelly on cello.

In June 2021, the band, now billed as Bobby Weir & Wolf Bros, performed four concerts in Colorado, and in July they played one show in California.

On February 18, 2022, the band released an album of recordings from the June 2021 concerts titled Live in Colorado, on CD, vinyl, and digital formats.

Bobby Weir & Wolf Bros, accompanied by the Wolfpack, played a spring 2022 concert tour with a lineup including Barry Sless on pedal steel guitar.

The band played a fall 2022 concert tour of 21 shows in 13 cities, with the quartet again accompanied by Barry Sless and the Wolfpack.

A second album of recordings from the June 2021 concerts, Live in Colorado Vol. 2, was released on October 7, 2022.

Bobby Weir & Wolf Bros, along with Barry Sless and the Wolfpack, toured the U.S. in February and March 2023.

Wolf Bros performed a number of concerts in 2023, 2024, and 2025.

Bob Weir died in January 2026.
