= Freaky Executives =

The Freaky Executives were an American 1980s ska funk musical group, based in the Berkeley, California area. They were a winner of a "Bammie" (Bay Area Music Award, later known as the "California Music Award"). The band was founded by singer Piero Ornelas (stage name "Piero El Malo", and now performing under the name Piero Amadeo Infante) and Michael Maung. Their music was a mix of ska, Latin, funk, and hard rock. Their song lyrics were explicitly critical of U.S. government policies, the Cold War, Apartheid and the Reagan administration.

They were signed briefly to Warner Bros. Records under Benny Medina, writer of The Fresh Prince of Bel-Air. Ornelas left the band shortly after, amid disagreements about how their record company wanted to change and commercialize their sound. Ornelas went on form the musical groups Los Angelitos, and Los Mocosos, both of which won California Music Awards. Ornelas performs with his band PAPAMALO. The Executive's drummer and background vocalist Scotty Roberts, son of actor Thalmus Rasulala, went on to produce and mix over 1,000 hip hop albums, and is now known as "One Drop Scott". Trombonist Dan Reagan has played with vocalist Marc Anthony.
