= JamBase =

Jam band-focused database and news website

JamBase is an online database and news portal of live music and festivals with a focus on live music. It was founded by Andy Gadiel and Ted Kartzman in 1998. The website primarily acts as a service, providing a public API that concert promoters and venues use to publish concert data to the site. The data is also used by third-party developers for other products. In addition to raw data, the website includes a news section publishing information about concerts in a blog format.

As of June 2015, JamBase ranks as the 4,945th most visited sites in the United States according to Alexa, and 27,837th globally.

As of August 2023, JamBase's public API at http://api.jambase.com has been re-enabled, allowing developers to incorporate concert listings into their apps and services.
