= Cazadero Performing Arts Camp =

Performing arts camp in California, US

Coordinates: 38°31′30.1″N 123°5′20.75″W

- Formation: 1957
- Type: Summer camp
- Location: Cazadero
- Affiliations: San Francisco Symphony Berkeley High School Berkeley, CA
- Remarks: cazadero.org

The Cazadero Performing Arts Camp (also known as Cazadero Music Camp, or Cazadero) is a performing arts camp located in the Sonoma redwoods in Northern California, United States. Established in 1957 by then Berkeley High School band director Bob Lutt (who eventually was made executive director of the Berkeley Symphony), the first campers were a mixture of Berkeley High teens and members of the San Francisco Symphony.

== History of the camp ==
Since 1957, the camp has had a significant influence in many facets of San Francisco Bay Area music, including the San Francisco Symphony, the orchestras for the San Francisco Opera and the San Francisco Ballet, and Tower of Power, an Oakland, California 10-member horn-based soul band formed in 1968. The first few years the camp consisted of musicians and their families. By 1963 they took over the entire summer for music education. In the mid- 70s Lutt and the city of Berkeley had a disagreement over the type of musicians who would attend the camp. The city of Berkeley thought the skill range of musicians who attend the camp should be more general so that students with different skill levels would all have the ability to attend. However, Lutt thought only more serious musicians should attend. In 1995 Bob’s son Bill Lutt, called former campers to see if they would be interested in resurrecting the camp. The following year music students returned to Cazadero.

== Founder Bob Lutt ==
Long time music teacher Bob Lutt was the founder of Cazadero Performing Arts Camp. Born in Nebraska, he started his life-long passion for music by asking his parents for a $25 trombone when he was 12. In 1954 Lutt began teaching at Berkeley High School. His years of teaching experience compelled him to ask Berkeley city officials to let him use a plot of land near Russian River. Lutt retired after 35 years of public education but could not stay away from music for very long. Bob was committed to music education until his death in October 26, 2011.

== Visiting conductors ==
Cazadero attracts a wide range of in demand music educators from the San Francisco Bay Area and beyond as music instruction is an essential aspect of everyday camp life. Every week Cazadero has a different conductor for orchestra, concert band, jazz band, and all camp choir. In the 2019 Junior High session, Aaron Smith was a guest conductor for concert band. During the school year, Smith works as a music teacher at Monterey Trail High School in Elk Grove, California. Also in the summer of 2019, Michael Boitz from Saratoga High School, Patrick Langham, Director of Jazz Studies at the University of Pacific and Susanna Peeples, worked as guest conductors for the junior high orchestra.

== Music faculty/staff ==
Cazadero faculty have been innovative with their instructional methods as they were the first to conceive of a professional baroque chamber orchestra composed entirely of period instruments, resulting in the 1981 creation of the Philharmonia Baroque Orchestra by harpsichordist Laurette Goldberg.

== Programs for Musicians ==
Each summer, the camp hosts educational programs for young musicians, as well as the Cazadero Performing Arts Family Camp where children and adults take arts classes side-by-side. Campers also enjoy 'downtime activities' such as swimming, ping pong, basketball, lanyards, friendship bracelets and foosball. The camp, which sits atop the late 19th century location of the then-infamous Bohemian Grove, maintains a signature suspension bridge over which more than 100,000 young musicians have crossed.
