= Bob Weir =

American musician (1947–2026)

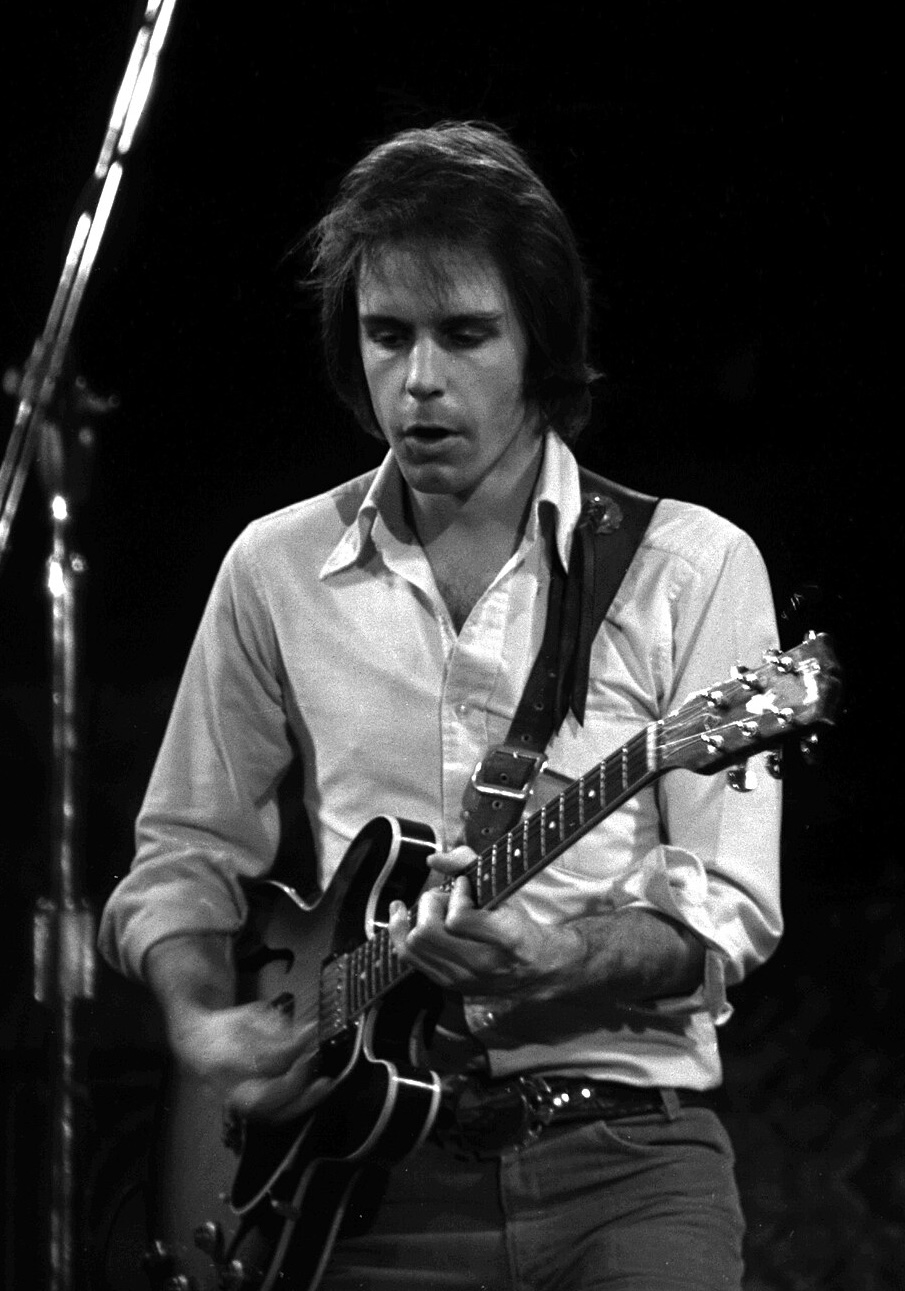
- Weir performing in 1975

Background information
- Born: Robert Hall Parber; October 16, 1947; San Francisco, California, U.S.
- Died: January 10, 2026 (aged 78) Mill Valley, California, U.S.
- Genres: Rock; psychedelia; jam; Americana
- Occupations: Musician; singer; songwriter
- Instruments: Guitar; vocals
- Years active: 1963–2025
- Labels: Warner Bros.; Arista; Grateful Dead; Columbia; Legacy
- Formerly of: Grateful Dead; Kingfish; Bobby and the Midnites; RatDog; The Other Ones; The Dead; Furthur; Dead & Company; Wolf Bros
- Website: bobweir.net

Robert Hall Weir (/wɪər/ WEER; né Parber; October 16, 1947 – January 10, 2026) was an American musician and songwriter best known as a founding member of the Grateful Dead. After the group disbanded in 1995, he performed with the Other Ones, later known as the Dead, together with other former members of the Grateful Dead. Weir also founded and played in several other bands during and after his career with the Grateful Dead, including Kingfish, the Bob Weir Band, Bobby and the Midnites, Scaring the Children, RatDog, and Furthur, which he co-led with former Grateful Dead bassist Phil Lesh. In 2015, Weir, along with former Grateful Dead members Mickey Hart and Bill Kreutzmann, joined with singer/guitarist John Mayer, bassist Oteil Burbridge, and keyboardist Jeff Chimenti to form the band Dead & Company.

During his career with the Grateful Dead, Weir played mostly rhythm guitar and sang many of the band's rock and country styled songs. In 1994, he was inducted into the Rock and Roll Hall of Fame as a member of the Grateful Dead. In 2024, he was awarded Kennedy Center Honors as a member of the Grateful Dead.

== Early life ==
Weir was born in San Francisco on October 16, 1947, to John (Jack) Parber (1925–2015), who was of Italian and German ancestry and fellow college student, Phyllis Inskeep (1924–1997), who was of German, Irish, and English ancestry and who later gave him up for adoption. He grew up with adoptive parents Frederic Utter Weir and Eleanor (née Cramer) Weir in Atherton. Weir began playing guitar at age 13 after less successful efforts with the piano and the trumpet. He experienced difficulties in school because of undiagnosed dyslexia and was expelled from nearly every school he attended, including Menlo School in Atherton and Fountain Valley School in Colorado Springs, Colorado, where he met future Grateful Dead lyricist John Perry Barlow.

== Career ==
On New Year's Eve 1963, an underaged 16-year-old Weir and his friend were wandering the back alleys of Palo Alto, looking for a club that would admit them, when they heard banjo music. They followed the music to its source, Dana Morgan's Music Store. They encountered a 21-year-old Jerry Garcia, oblivious to the date, waiting for his students to arrive. Weir and Garcia spent the night playing music together and then decided to form a band. The Beatles significantly influenced the band's musical direction. "The Beatles were why we turned from a jug band into a rock 'n' roll band", said Weir. "What we saw them doing was impossibly attractive. I couldn't think of anything else more worth doing." Originally called Mother McCree's Uptown Jug Champions, the band was later renamed The Warlocks and eventually the Grateful Dead.

Weir played rhythm guitar and sang a large portion of the lead vocals through all of the Dead's 30-year career. In the fall of 1968, the Dead played some concerts without Weir and Ron "Pigpen" McKernan. These shows, with the band billed as "Mickey and the Hartbeats", were intermixed with full-lineup Grateful Dead concerts. In his biography of Jerry Garcia, Blair Jackson notes, "Garcia and Lesh determined that Weir and Pigpen were not pulling their weight musically in the band... Most of the band fights at this time were about Bobby's guitar playing." Late in the year, the band relented and reinstated Weir and Pigpen back in full-time.

The incident apparently led to a period of significant growth in Weir's guitar playing. Phil Lesh said that when drummer Mickey Hart left the band temporarily in early 1971, he was able to hear Weir's playing more clearly than ever and "I found myself astonished, delighted and excited beyond measure at what Bobby was doing." Lesh described Weir's playing as "quirky, whimsical and goofy" and noted his ability to play chord voicings on the guitar (with only four fingers) that one would normally hear from a keyboard (with up to ten fingers).

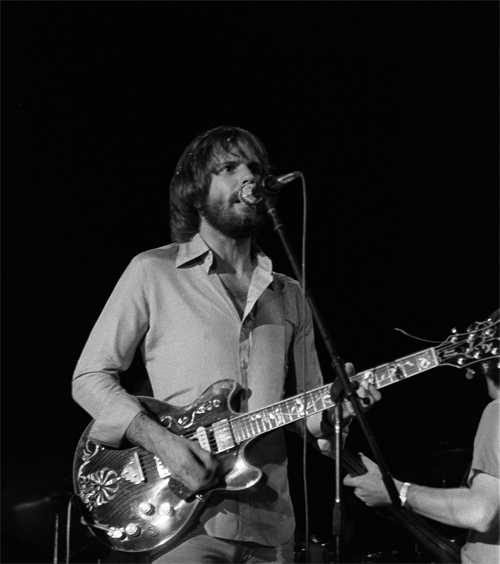
Weir performing in 1976

In the late 1970s, Weir began to experiment with slide guitar techniques and perform certain songs during Dead shows using the slide. His unique guitar style is strongly influenced by the hard bop pianist McCoy Tyner, and he has cited artists as diverse as John Coltrane, the Rev. Gary Davis, and Igor Stravinsky as influences. Weir's first solo album Ace appeared in 1972, with the Grateful Dead performing as the band on the album, though credited individually. This lineup included Keith Godchaux and his wife Donna, both of whom would be in the band by the time of the album's release. A live version of the album's best-known song, "Playing in the Band", had been issued on the Skull & Roses album of the previous year. While continuing to perform as a member of the Grateful Dead, in 1975 and 1976, Weir played in the Bay Area band Kingfish with friends Matt Kelly and Dave Torbert. He later contributed to Kelly's 1987 album A Wing and a Prayer, on Relix Records. In 1978 he fronted the Bob Weir Band with Brent Mydland, who joined the Grateful Dead the following year. In 1980 he formed another side band, Bobby and the Midnites.

Shortly before Garcia's death in 1995, Weir formed another band, RatDog Revue, later shortened to RatDog. In RatDog, Weir performed covers of songs by various artists, including The Beatles, Bob Dylan, Chuck Berry, and Willie Dixon while also performing many Grateful Dead songs. In addition, Ratdog performed many of their own originals, most of which were released on the album Evening Moods. Weir has participated in the various reformations of the Grateful Dead's members, including 1998, 2000, and 2002 stints as the Other Ones and in 2003, 2004 and 2009 as The Dead. In 2008 he performed in the two Deadheads for Obama concerts. In 2009 Bob Weir and Phil Lesh formed a new band called Furthur—so-named in honor of Ken Kesey's famous psychedelically painted bus.

In 2011, Weir founded the Tamalpais Research Institute, also known as TRI Studios. TRI is a high-tech recording studio and virtual music venue, used to stream live concerts over the internet in high-definition.

In 2012, Weir toured with Chris Robinson of the Black Crowes and singer/songwriter Jackie Greene as the Weir, Robinson, & Greene Acoustic Trio.

Weir revived RatDog in March 2013. The RatDog Quartet, featuring Weir, Jay Lane, Robin Sylvester, and Jonathan Wilson debuted on March 3, at the Sweetwater Music Hall. Jason Crosby was their featured guest at the first two shows. On April 25, 2013, Weir fell down onstage during a Furthur performance at the Capitol Theater in Port Chester, New York. The band finished the show without him. He performed with the band two days later in Atlantic City, but on April 29 a representative announced that Weir would be "unable to perform in any capacity for the next several weeks" for unspecified reasons. Weir resumed performing that summer. Six weeks after his fall, he made a surprise appearance at the small Huichica Music Festival on June 15.

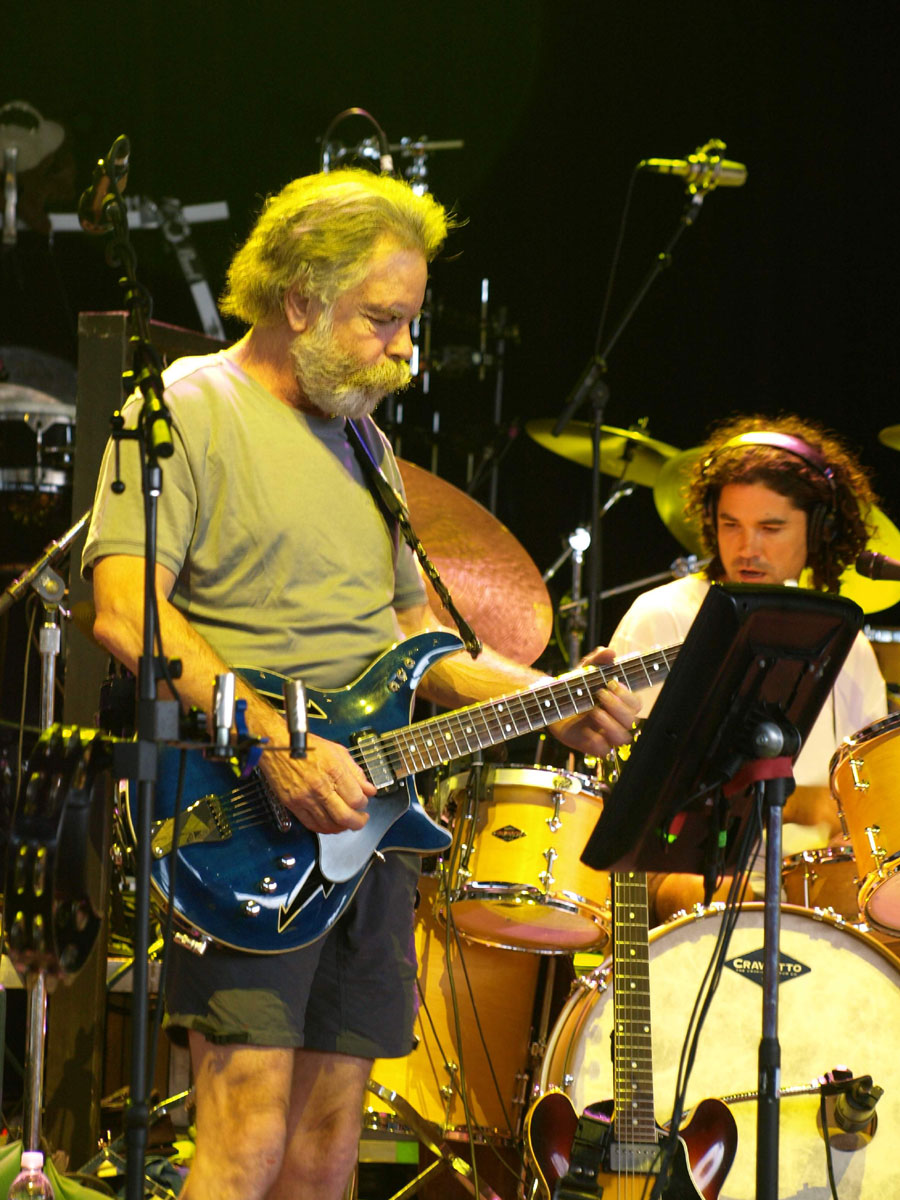
Weir and Jay Lane onstage with RatDog in 2009

On April 23, 2014, The Other One: The Long Strange Trip of Bob Weir premiered at the Tribeca Film Festival directed by Mike Fleiss, husband of Miss America 2012, Laura Kaeppeler. On August 10, 2014, Weir abruptly canceled all of his upcoming appearances, according to The Huffington Post, "The cancellations include all shows for the rest of the year with his band Ratdog, as well as a concert with Furthur". According to Jambase, Ratdog performed without Weir in Las Vegas in July 2014. "A statement from the venue said Weir was 'under the weather'."

In early July 2015, Weir joined the other original living members of the Grateful Dead —Mickey Hart, Bill Kreutzmann, and Phil Lesh — for three shows at Soldier Field in Chicago. These four surviving members (known as the "Core Four") were joined by Jeff Chimenti on keys and Phish's Trey Anastasio on lead guitar and shared vocals, and Bruce Hornsby on piano. The reunion was 20 years nearly to the day since the band's final concert with Jerry Garcia at the same venue in 1995. "Fare Thee Well: Celebrating 50 Years of Grateful Dead" was billed as the original four members' last performance together. Based on demand, two additional Fare Thee Well concerts were added to the series, performed in late June 2015 at Levi Stadium in California. The first show was on June 27, and featured a rainbow that appeared in the sky over the stadium. Billboard noted that one longtime Deadhead in attendance exclaimed, "This is the band that jams with God." The website said, "the sentiment prompted massive cheers which led to an hour-long intermission." Billboard had previously reported that one insider claimed the production paid US$50,000 for the effect, but an update said that further investigation revealed that "this band really does jam with God."

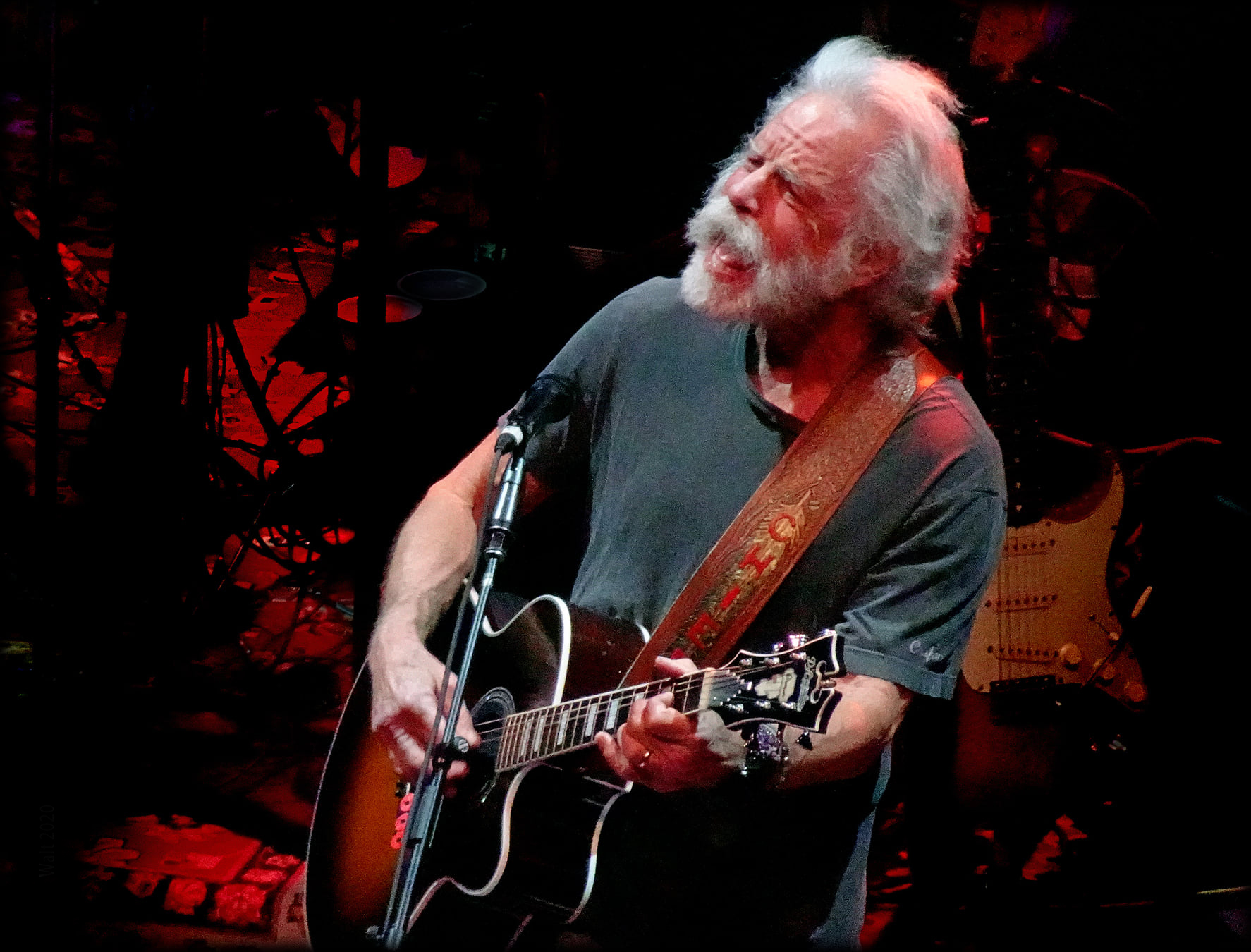
Weir singing "El Paso" at the Chicago Theater on March 11, 2020

On October 5, 2015, Weir performed with Ratdog at a special celebratory 60th Birthday Bash for Steve Kimock. It was the first time Ratdog had performed since the cancellations of his 2014 summer tour. In late 2015, Weir teamed up with former Grateful Dead bandmates Mickey Hart and Billy Kreutzmann as well as guitarist John Mayer, bassist Oteil Burbridge and keyboardist Jeff Chimenti to form Dead & Company. They played 22 shows starting at the end of October, concluding with a four show New Year's run including two shows each in San Francisco and Los Angeles, ending with a three set show on New Year's Eve. The band concluded its final tour on July 16, 2023, at Oracle Park in San Francisco. On January 31, 2024, the band announced a concert residency at Sphere in Las Vegas, Nevada, to begin in May 2024. While eighteen shows were announced initially, the residency was extended to thirty shows, ending in August 2024.

In May 2016, Weir was a guest speaker and performer for the second annual Einstein Gala, in Toronto, Canada, an event honoring the legacy of Albert Einstein and new visionaries in the arts and sciences. Weir spoke about what science and innovation had meant to him. Weir performed a solo acoustic set, and was joined mid-set by guitarist Dan Kanter. In the same month, Weir also confirmed, in an interview with The Guardian, that he was writing a book.

In 2016, a live recording of Weir performing with The National was included in the Day of the Dead release. Weir's 2012 collaboration with members of The National as part of The Bridge Session helped pave the way for the Grateful Dead tribute. In June 2016, at the Bonnaroo Arts And Music Festival, Weir received the first ever Les Paul Spirit Award, from the Les Paul Foundation. Michael Braunstein, the foundation's executive director, said:

I cannot think of anyone more fitting to be honored with the first annual Les Paul Spirit Award than Bob Weir. Not only is he an extraordinary talent who has given us an amazing array of legendary music, but he is an innovator who understands music, technologies and the spirit of Les Paul. If Les were still alive today, I have absolutely no doubt that he and Bob would be experimenting together at TRI Studios or at Les's house and the results would be extraordinary.

Weir received the 2016 Lifetime Achievement Award at the 2016 Americana Honors & Awards in Nashville. In September 2016, Weir released a new album of "cowboy songs" titled Blue Mountain. The release was followed by a tour beginning in October 2016. The album was inspired by his time working as a ranch hand in Wyoming when he was fifteen years old.

During the spring of 2018, Weir performed a series of concerts with former Grateful Dead bassist Phil Lesh. The duo, with guest musicians, was billed as Bobby and Phil. In 2018, Weir formed a band called Wolf Bros. Billed as Bob Weir & Wolf Bros, the group initially was a trio, with Weir on guitar and vocals, Don Was on upright bass, and Jay Lane on drums. They toured the US in the fall of 2018, the spring of 2019, and in early 2020. In late 2020 and early 2021, the band played several concerts at TRI Studios with Jeff Chimenti on keyboards and Greg Leisz on pedal steel guitar. After the first of these shows the band also added a horn and string section called the Wolfpack, comprising Brian Switzer on trumpet, Adam Theis on trombone, Sheldon Brown on saxophone, clarinet, and flute, Mads Tolling on violin, and Alex Kelly on cello. In the summer of 2021 this larger ensemble, now billed as Bobby Weir & Wolf Bros, played several concerts in Colorado and California.

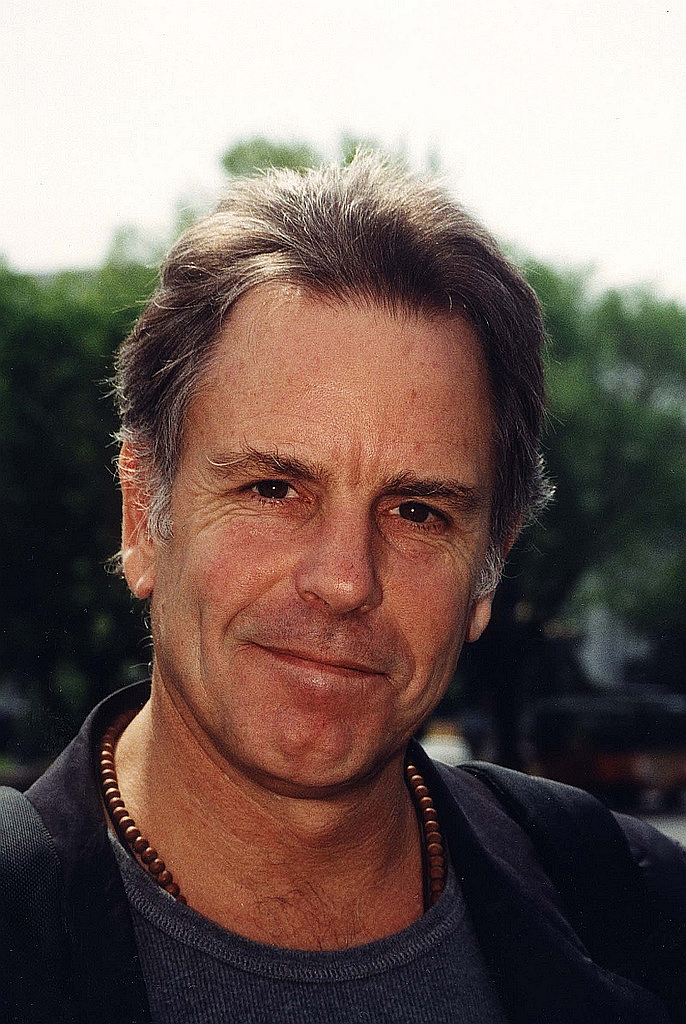
Bob Weir in Washington, D.C., on April 24, 2000

In 2022, after the pandemic put a temporary stop to touring, Weir and Wolf Bros resumed playing shows, touring the US in the spring with The Wolfpack string section. Included was a May 1, 2022, show with Mickey Hart, Zakir Hussain and a revived Planet Drum and a pair of shows at Radio City Music Hall in April marking the 50th anniversary of Weir's album Ace. The fall 2022 "Bobby Weir & Wolf Bros featuring The Wolfpack" tour included four shows at the Kennedy Center in October. The 2023 winter tour included three February concerts with the Atlanta Symphony Orchestra at Atlanta Symphony Hall. In April 2023, Bobby Weir & Wolf Bros Trio played four shows at the Guild Theatre in Menlo Park.

As part of the band's fall 2023 run, Bobby Weir & Wolf Bros featuring The Wolfpack joined Willie Nelson's Outlaw Music Festival for seven shows in September. The band's tour ended with a residency at the Capitol Theatre in New York. Weir performed at the first Dead Ahead Festival in Cancún in January 2024. Weir's other 2024 appearances included a show with the String Cheese Incident, billed as "The Bob Weir Incident", and a New Year's Eve run in Fort Lauderdale. In December he was present as the Grateful Dead were inducted at the Kennedy Center Honors.

In January 2025, Weir returned to curate the second Dead Ahead Festival at Riviera Cancún, Mexico, where he also performed along with a lineup that included Sturgill Simpson, Rick Mitarotonda, Oteil Burbridge, Brandi Carlile and others. A two-month spring 2025 residency was booked for Dead & Company at the Sphere in Las Vegas. In the meantime, on January 31, Weir, Mickey Hart and Grateful Dead family members accepted MusiCares Persons of the Year awards for their philanthropic work.

== Bobby Weir & Wolf Bros symphony project ==
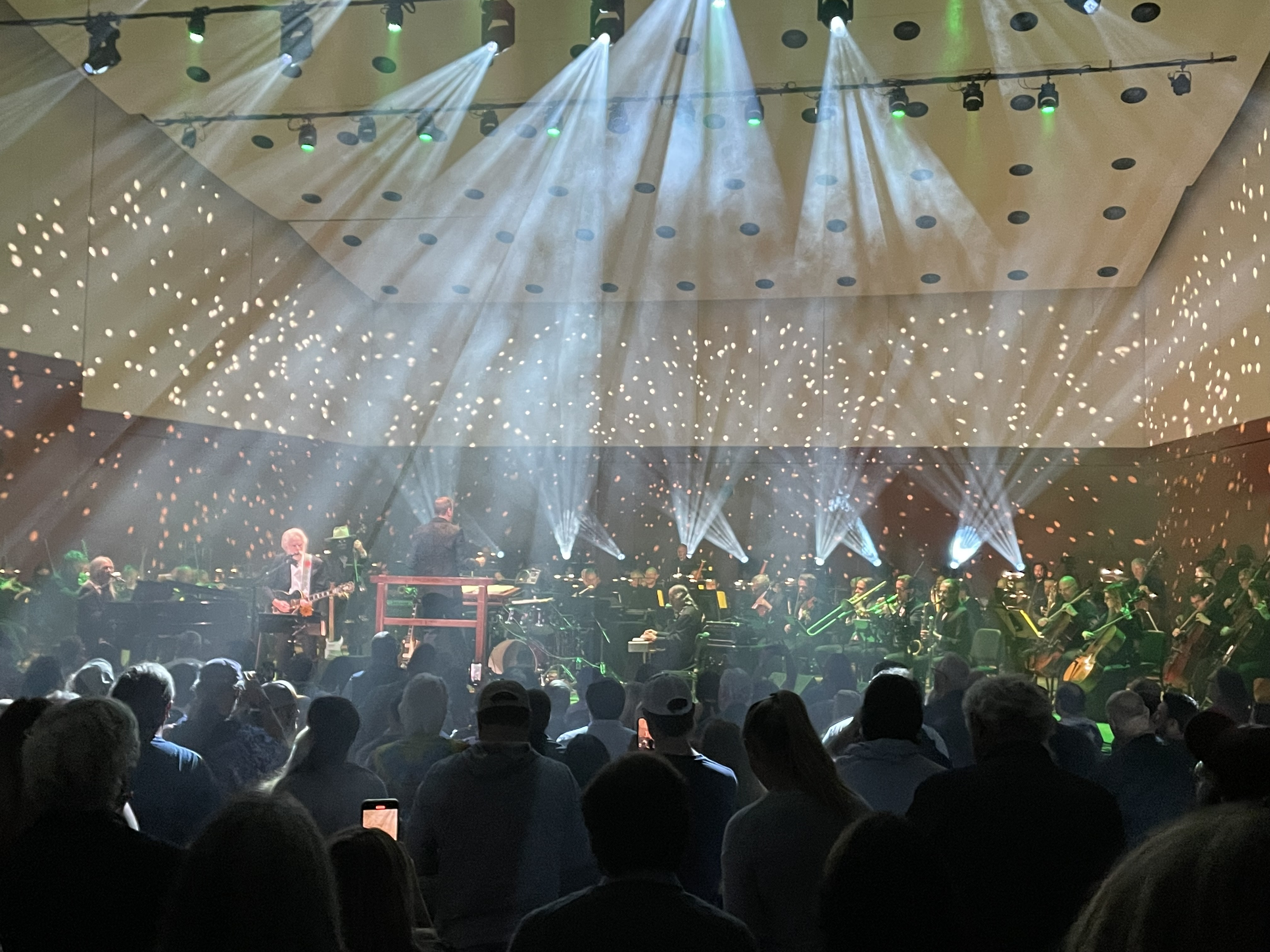
Bob Weir performing with the Atlanta Symphony Orchestra on February 18, 2023

In 2022, Bobby Weir & Wolf Bros launched a series of performances with symphony orchestras, with four sold-out shows with the National Symphony Orchestra at the Kennedy Center. The concerts feature "sonic elaborations" of Grateful Dead classics, Weir solo numbers, and covers.

The series resumed in February 2023, with three concerts in Atlanta with the Atlanta Symphony Orchestra. In October 2023, Bobby Weir & Wolf Bros performed with the Stanford Symphony Orchestra at Frost Amphitheater. The series picked up with a fall 2024 tour, as Bobby Weir & Wolf Bros featuring The Wolfpack were backed by the Cincinnati Pops Orchestra in Cincinnati, the Chicago Philharmonic in Chicago, and the Louisiana Philharmonic Orchestra in New Orleans, for a total of five shows. The concert programs included "A Grateful Overture" by Giancarlo Aquilanti and music from Grateful Dead albums including Aoxomoxoa, Wake of the Flood and Shakedown Street.

The last symphony show took place June 21, 2025, at the Royal Albert Hall in London with the Royal Philharmonic Concert Orchestra.

== Personal life and death ==
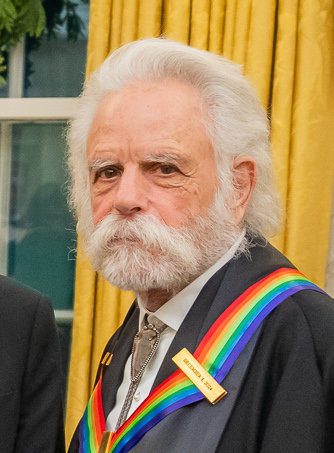
Weir in the White House Oval Office on December 8, 2024

Along with fellow Grateful Dead bandmate Ron "Pigpen" McKernan, Weir was arrested for possession of marijuana in a raid which occurred at the band's communal home on October 2, 1967. He remained unmarried throughout his years with the Grateful Dead. He lived from 1969 to 1975 with Frankie Hart. Hart had been a go-go dancer at the Peppermint Lounge in New York, had worked in Apple Records American marketing department, for Apple Records in London, and had performed on the TV shows Hullabaloo and Shindig!. She was allegedly the inspiration for the Robert Hunter-Bob Weir song "Sugar Magnolia". Weir made her acquaintance through Mickey Hart, who dated her briefly. He met her following her first Grateful Dead show in New York in 1968. Her real name at that time was Frankie Azzara (from a previous marriage), but used the stage name "Frankie Hart" (after apparently "borrowing" Hart's last name). Although she and Weir never married, she adopted his last name after moving in with him and was subsequently known as Frankie Weir.

On July 15, 1999, Weir and Natascha Münter married in Mill Valley, California. Together, they had two daughters. Weir's sister-in law is Leilani Münter, a former race car driver in the ARCA Racing Series circuit. Weir was a long-term vegetarian and advocate for animal rights who was influential in the founding of Farm Sanctuary.

In 1991, Weir co-wrote a children's book called Panther Dream: A Story of the African Rainforest with his sister Wendy Weir, who illustrated the book with her acrylic paintings. It is the story of a boy who ventures into the African rainforest in search of food for his hungry family, and it describes and illustrates many rainforest animal species. The publisher, Hyperion, donated the proceeds from the sale of the book to reforestation programs in Africa.

Weir was an avid mountain biker in the early years of the sport. He lived in a mountainous area with a trail network and frequently rode with MTB pioneer Gary Fisher.

In February 2004, Weir captured the Scripps Howard Super Sage Award as his Super Bowl prediction of New England beating Carolina, 33–24, was closest to the actual 32–29 score. Weir's prediction was the most accurate out of 148 celebrities who participated in Scripps Howard's Celebrity Super Bowl Poll. Weir was on the board of directors of the Rex Foundation, the Furthur Foundation, and HeadCount. He was also a member of the advisory board of the Jerry Garcia Foundation along with Peter Shapiro and Seth Rogin. Weir was an honorary member of the board of directors of the environmental organization Rainforest Action Network, along with Woody Harrelson, Bonnie Raitt, and John Densmore. He was also on the honorary board of directors of Little Kids Rock, a non-profit organization that provides free musical instruments and instruction to children in under-served public schools throughout the U.S.

In July of 2025, Weir was diagnosed with cancer. He then went on to perform a trio of farewell concerts with Dead & Company at Golden Gate Park on August 1, 2, and 3. Despite surviving the cancer, he died from underlying lung issues on January 10, 2026, at the age of 78.

A 'Homecoming' memorial celebration was held in his honor in San Francisco's Civic Center Plaza on January 17, 2026, with thousands attending. Speakers and performers at the event included John Mayer, Joan Baez, and Mickey Hart.

== Guitars ==
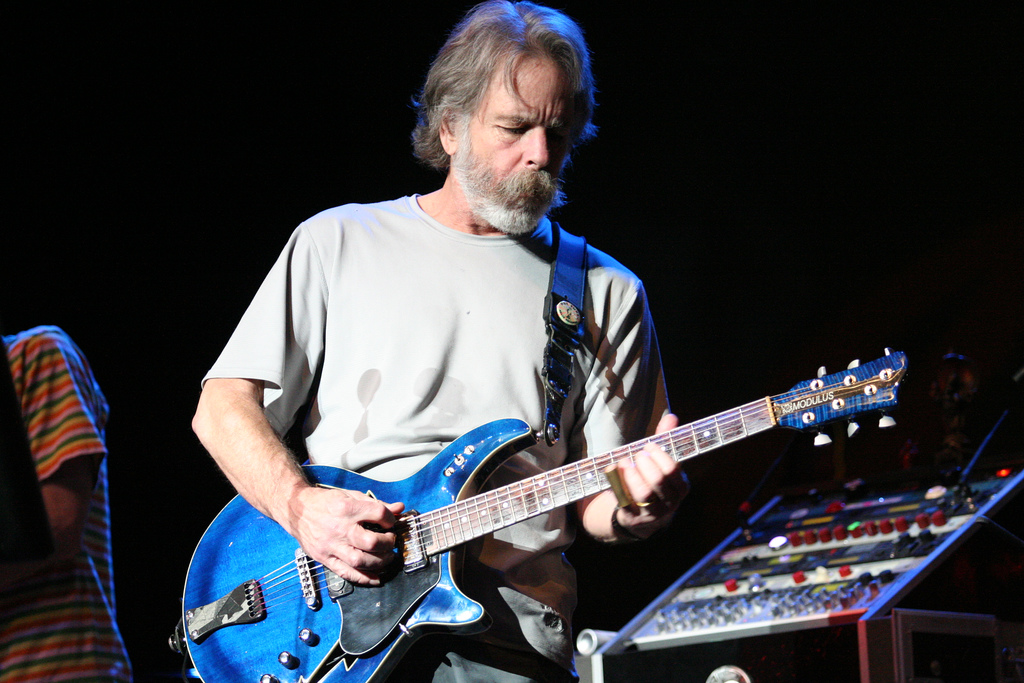
Weir onstage in 2007, playing a Modulus G3FH

Early pictures of The Warlocks in concert show him playing a Gretsch Duo-Jet, and after the Warlocks became the Grateful Dead, Weir briefly played a Rickenbacker 365, a Guild Starfire IV semi-hollowbody (with Garcia playing an identical cherry red Starfire IV, which appears very similar to the Gibson ES-335) as well as a Fender Telecaster before settling on a cherry red 1965 Gibson ES-335 as his primary guitar for the following decade. Weir can also be seen playing a sunburst ES-335 in The Grateful Dead Movie, filmed in October 1974. During the early 1970s, Weir also used a Gibson ES-345 and a 1961 or 1962 Gibson SG.

In 1974, Weir began working with Jeff Hasselberger at Ibanez to develop a custom instrument. Weir began playing the Ibanez 2681 during the recording of Blues for Allah; this was a testbed instrument with sliding pickups that Hasselberger used to develop several additional 2681s for use onstage, as well as Weir's custom "Cowboy Fancy" guitar, which he played from 1976 until the mid-1980s. Weir began using a Modulus Blackknife at that point, and continued to play the Blackknife, along with a hybrid Modulus/Casio guitar for the "Space" segment of Grateful Dead concerts for the rest of that band's history. Weir's acoustic guitars include several Martins, a Guild, an Ovation, and a line of Alvarez-Yairi WY1 Bob Weir signature acoustics.

With his post-Grateful Dead bands, Weir has played a Modulus G3FH custom, a Gibson ES-335, and a 1956 Fender Telecaster previously owned by James Louis Parber, his late half-brother. In August 2016, during a preview of Weir's solo album, Blue Mountain, Weir stated that the only instrument he used during the recording of the album was a Martin acoustic guitar.

From 2017 onwards, Weir collaborated with D'Angelico Guitars based in Manhattan, New York, to produce several signature model instruments. The Premier, a semi-hollow guitar, was released in 2017, and the Deluxe Bedford, a solid body guitar, was released in 2020. In 2024 Weir and D'Angelico introduced the Deluxe Bobby Weir 3, a semi-hollow electric guitar.

== Discography ==
Grateful Dead and related bands

- Mother McCree's Uptown Jug Champions – Mother McCree's Uptown Jug Champions (1999)
- The Strange Remain – The Other Ones (1999)
- Fare Thee Well: Celebrating 50 Years of the Grateful Dead – Fare Thee Well (2015)

Solo albums

- Ace (1972)
- Heaven Help the Fool (1978)
- Weir Here – The Best of Bob Weir (2004) – compilation
- Blue Mountain (2016)

Kingfish

- Kingfish (1976)
- Live 'n' Kickin' (1977)
- Kingfish in Concert: King Biscuit Flower Hour (1996)

Bobby and the Midnites

- Bobby and the Midnites (1981)
- Where the Beat Meets the Street (1984)

Bob Weir and Rob Wasserman

- Live (1998)
- Fall 1989: The Long Island Sound (2013) – also Jerry Garcia Band

RatDog

- Evening Moods (2000)
- Live at Roseland (2001)

Wolf Bros

- Live in Colorado (2022)
- Live in Colorado Vol. 2 (2022)

With other artists

- Gathering – Josh Ritter (2017)
- Bear's Sonic Journals: Dawn of the New Riders of the Purple Sage – New Riders of the Purple Sage (2020)
- Bear's Sonic Journals: Sing Out! – various artists (2024)

Videos

- Move Me Brightly (2013)
- The Other One: The Long, Strange Trip of Bob Weir (2015)
