= Josh Ritter discography =

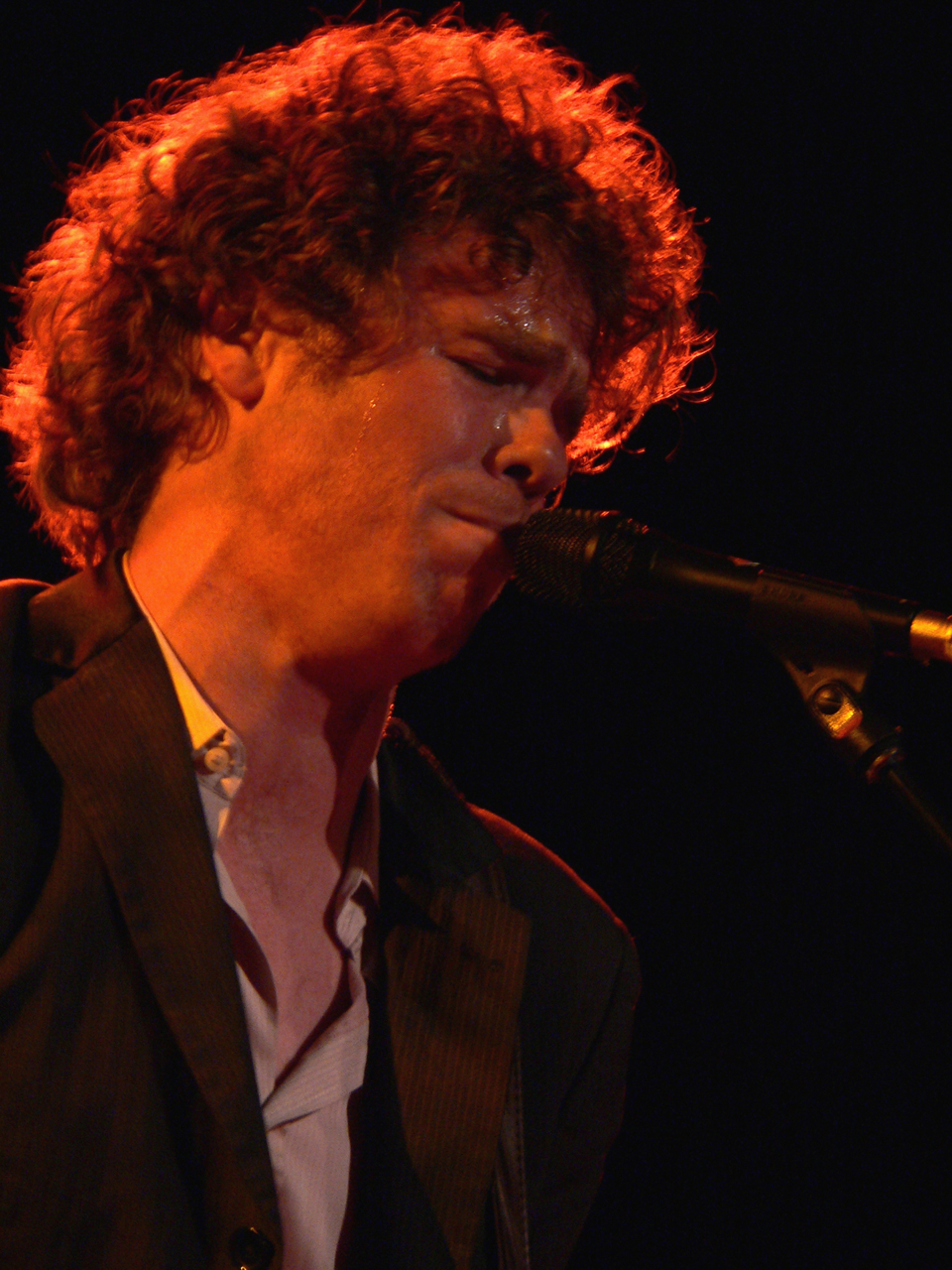
- Josh Ritter at the Music Hall of Williamsburg.
- Studio albums: 9
- EPs: 7
- Live albums: 5
- Singles: 20

The American Americana musician Josh Ritter has released thirteen studio albums, five live albums, seven extended plays, and twenty singles. He debuted with a self-released, self-titled debut album in April 2000.

Ritter's most recent album is I Believe in You, My Honeydew, which was released on September 12, 2025.

== Albums ==
=== Studio albums ===
List of studio albums with selected chart positions
Title	Album details	Peak chart positions				
Title	Album details	US	US Folk	US Rock	BEL	NLD
Josh Ritter	Released: April 1, 2000; Label: The Orchard; Formats: CD	—	—	—	—	—
Golden Age of Radio	Released: January 22, 2002 (US); Released: January 22, 2002 (IR); Label: Signature Sounds (US); Label: Hungry Ear Records (IR); Formats: CD, LP	—	—	—	—	—
Hello Starling	Released: September 9, 2003 (IR); Released: February 22, 2005 (US); Label: Signature Sounds (IR); Label: V2 Records (US); Formats: CD, LP	—	—	—	—	—
The Animal Years	Released: March 20, 2006; Label: V2 Records; Formats: CD, LP	—	—	—	—	—
The Historical Conquests of Josh Ritter	Released: August 21, 2007; Label: Sony BMG; Formats: CD	79	—	—	—	—
So Runs the World Away	Released: May 4, 2010; Label: Pytheas Recordings; Formats: CD, LP, Digital	41	1	12	—	—
The Beast in Its Tracks	Released: March 4, 2013; Label: Pytheas Recordings; Formats: CD, LP, Digital	22	3	8	191	98
Sermon on the Rocks	Released: October 16, 2015; Label: Pytheas Recordings; Formats: CD, LP, Digital	49	1	6	—	—
Gathering	Released: September 22, 2017; Label: Pytheas Recordings; Formats: CD, LP, Digital	88	4	10	—	—
Fever Breaks	Released: April 26, 2019; Label: Pytheas Recordings; Formats: CD, LP, digital	89	4	12	—	—
Spectral Lines	Released: April 28, 2023; Label: Pytheas Recording; Formats: CD, LP, Digital	—	—	—	—	—
Heaven, or Someplace as Nice	Released: October 11, 2024; Label: Pytheas Recording; Formats: CD, LP, Digital	—	—	—	—	—
I Believe in You, My Honeydew	Released: September 12, 2025; Label: Pytheas Recording; Formats: CD, LP, Digital	—	—	—	—	—
"—" denotes a recording that did not chart or was not released in that territory.

=== Live albums ===
List of live albums
Title	Album details
In the Dark – Live at Vicar Street	Released: November 24, 2006(IR); Label: Self-release(IR); Formats: DVD, CD
Live at The Record Exchange	Released: January 23, 2007; Label: Megaphon; Formats: CD
Live at the 9:30 Club	Released: April 19, 2008; Label: Sony BMG; Formats: CD
Josh Ritter & The Royal City Band – Live at The Iveagh Gardens	Released: December 13, 2011; Label: Pytheas Recordings; Formats: DVD, CD
Josh Ritter – Acoustic Live Vol. 1: Somerville Theater/Somerville, Mass	Released: January 20, 2015; Label: Pytheas Recordings; Formats: CD, LP
"—" denotes a recording that did not chart or was not released in that territory.

== Extended plays ==
List of extended plays, with selected chart positions
Title	Album details	Peak chart positions		
Title	Album details	US	US Folk	US Rock
Me & Jiggs EP	Released: 2002; Label: Self-released; Formats: CD	—	—	—
Come & Find Me EP	Released: 2002; Label: Signature Sounds; Formats: CD	—	—	—
4 Songs Live EP	Released: February 22, 2005; Label: V2; Formats: CD	—	—	—
Good Man EP	Released: 2006; Label: Self-release; Formats: Digital	—	—	—
Girl In the War EP	Released: August 29, 2006; Label: V2; Formats: CD, LP	—	—	—
To the Yet Unknowing World	Released: February 8, 2011; Label: Pytheas Recordings; Formats: CD, LP, Digital	—	—	—
Bringing in the Darlings	Released: February 16, 2012; Label: Pytheas Recordings; Formats: CD, LP, Digital	122	5	29
See Here, I Have Built You A Mansion	Released: August 28, 2020; Label: Pytheas Recordings; Formats: CD, LP, Digital	—	—	—
Truth Is a Dimension (Both Invisible and Blinding)	Released: June 28, 2022; Label: Self-release; Formats: Digital	—	—	—
"—" denotes a recording that did not chart or was not released in that territory.

== Singles ==
List of singles, showing year released and album name
Title	Year	Peak chart positions	Album
Title	Year	US AAA	Album
"Hello Starling (Snow Is Gone)"	2004	–	Hello Starling
"Bright Smile"	2004	–	Hello Starling
"Man Burning"	2004	–	Hello Starling
"Thin Blue Flame"	2005	–	The Animal Years
"Girl in the War"	2006	–	The Animal Years
"Lillian, Egypt"	2006	–	The Animal Years
"Wolves"	2006	–	The Animal Years
"Mind's Eye"	2007	–	The Historical Conquests of Josh Ritter
"Right Moves"	2007	–	The Historical Conquests of Josh Ritter
"Empty Hearts"	2008	–	The Historical Conquests of Josh Ritter
"Real Long Distance"	2008	–	The Historical Conquests of Josh Ritter
"Change of Time"	2010	–	So Runs the World Away
"Joy to You Baby"	2012	–	The Beast in Its Tracks
"Hopeful"	2013	–	The Beast in Its Tracks
"Getting Ready To Get Down"	2015	16	Sermon on the Rocks
"Homecoming"	2015	–	Sermon on the Rocks
"The Temptation of Adam [live]"	2016	–	30 Days, 30 Songs
"Showboat"	2017	–	Gathering
"Thunderbolt's Goodnight"	2017	–	Gathering
"When Will I Be Changed"	2017	–	Gathering
"Miles Away"	2018	–	Non-album single
"Old Black Magic"	2019	27	Fever Breaks
"Losing Battles"	2019	40	Fever Breaks
"Time is Wasting"	2020	–	See Here, I Have Built You A Mansion
"For Your Soul"	2023	9	Spectral Lines
