= Parsonsfield =

Parsonsfield may refer to:

- Parsonsfield (band), American folk rock group
- Parsonsfield, Maine, a town in the U.S. state of Maine
