= 4 Songs Live =

4 Songs Live EP

EP by Josh Ritter
- Released: February 22, 2005
- Studio: Heineken Green Energy, Dublin; Vicar Street Theatre, Dublin
- Genre: Folk rock; Americana
- Length: 17:00
- Label: V2 Records
- Producer: Jim Lockhart

Josh Ritter chronology
Hello Starling (2003)	4 Songs Live EP (2005)	The Animal Years (2006)

4 Songs Live EP is an EP by American singer-songwriter Josh Ritter. It was released on February 22, 2005.

The EP features live recordings of three songs from Hello Starling and one song from Golden Age of Radio. It was recorded in October 2003 and June 2004 at Vicar Street and the Green Energy Festival in Dublin.

== Critical reception ==
Professional ratings
Review scores
Source	Rating
AllMusic	3.5/5 stars
Silent Uproar	3/5 stars

Ritter's recordings on 4 Songs Live was described as an intoxicating stage presence.

== Track listing ==
All songs written by Josh Ritter.

1. "Kathleen" – 4:35
2. "Golden Age of Radio" – 4:37
3. "You Don't Make It Easy Babe" – 3:36
4. "Snow Is Gone (Hello Starling)" – 4:12

== Production credits ==
- Produced by Jim Lockhart
- Mastered by Emily Lazar
- Mixed by Kevin Shirley
- Audio engineered by Mark McGrath
