= Live at the 9:30 Club =

Live at the 9:30 Club may refer to:

- Live at the 9:30, a 2010 DVD by Clutch
- Live at the 9:30 Club (Virginia Coalition album) a 2006 album by Virginia Coalition
- Live at the 9:30 Club (EP), a 2008 EP by Josh Ritter
- Live at the 930 Club Washington, D.C., a live album by Psychic TV
