= My Light, My Destroyer =

Studio album by Cassandra Jenkins
- Released: July 12, 2024
- Genres: Chamber pop, indie rock
- Length: 36:52
- Language: English
- Label: Dead Oceans
- Producer: Andrew Lappin

Cassandra Jenkins chronology
An Overview on Phenomenal Nature (2021)	My Light, My Destroyer (2024)

"And the root of Apollo—the god of light, of course—in that root is not only 'my god', but also 'to destroy'. So she is, in one fell swoop, by shifting the inflection very slightly, saying to Apollo both 'you're my god' and 'you're my destroyer'."

— Jenkins on adapting an Ann Carson poem about Apollo and Cassandra into the title of this album.

My Light, My Destroyer is the third studio album by American pop musician Cassandra Jenkins. It is her first release on Dead Oceans and has received positive reviews from critics who have praised her songwriting, evolution as a musician from her previous work, and the cosmic themes on the songs, written with a metaphorical overview effect that discusses personal emotions.

== Reception ==
Editors at AnyDecentMusic? scored this release an 8.3 out of 10, aggregating 19 reviews. According to the review aggregator Metacritic, My Light, My Destroyer received "universal acclaim" based on a weighted average score of 89 out of 100 from 17 critic scores.

Editors at AllMusic rated this album 4.5 out of 5 stars, with critic Timothy Monger writing "although more experimental and stylistically varied, My Light, My Destroyer plays like an emotional sequel to" 2021 release An Overview on Phenomenal Nature by "exploring similar human themes from different angles" along with "plenty of sonic variance throughout the set with intriguing field-recorded interludes and instrumentals". At BrooklynVegan, Andrew Sacher wrote that in spite of the anticipation built up from her last album, "it sounds to me like Cassandra isn't letting any of the hype and fame get to her; My Light, My Destroyer is a worthy followup from an artist who's seemingly keeping her head down and continuing to explore her own musical universe". John Williamson of Clash Music scored this release an 8 out of 10 for combining various musical elements to make a collection that is "both deadly serious and funny, but always habitable". Exclaim!'s Eric Hill gave this work an 7 out of 10, writing that it "opens an interrogation of subtle differences between guise and disguise" as Jenkins is "casting around for meanings hidden in both the far flung cosmos and micro momentary". Sandra Song of The Fader called this "an album that's constantly in flux, with Jenkins dissecting loneliness and connection through cross-genre experimentation and the type of inner thoughts collected from some late-night existential crisis". Alexis Petridis of The Guardian named this the Album of the Week and scored it 4 out of 5 stars, calling it "an album so thick with sadness and seclusion [that] is remarkably easy listening", praising the arrangements in particular.

John Amen of The Line of Best Fit scored the album 9 out of 10, concluding, "[Jenkins] explores themes that have been relevant at least since the advent of the Cognitive Revolution 30,000-plus years ago — creation, destruction, ecstasy, transcendence — yet does so in her own contemporary, refreshing, and utterly commanding way". Sam Walton of Loud and Quiet gave this work a 10 out of 10, calling it "a collection of songs that hasn't been willed into existence by a pressured musician, but rather one that's been encountered in the process of diligent exploration and then nurtured to maturity" with songs that "are confident but never flashy, comforting but never bland, and, throughout, quietly riveting" and remind him of The Blue Nile, Radiohead, and Wilco. In Mojo, Jim Wirth gave this album 4 out of 5 stars, characterizing it as "jewel-sparkly and gently devastating" and compared this work to Skylarking by XTC and Judee Sill. John Murphy of musicOMH scored this release 5 out of 5 stars, stating that it "feels like a huge step forward for Jenkins" to move past her earlier dream pop work and that "there's a quiet power in the unobtrusive nature of these songs that are destined to salve your soul in troubled times".

In a profile for The New York Times, Grayson Haver Currin characterized My Light, My Destroyer as Jenkins' "subtle and sprawling third album, out Friday, on which field-recorded collages abut jangling rockers and diaphanous ballads". Editors at Paste made this a Paste Pick and critic Hayden Merrick scored it an 8.8 out of 10 for having "affecting, comprehensive songs that template a spiritually healthy existence", using space imagery in the lyrics as a "gateway to inspiration and perspective". Editors at Pitchfork scored this release 8.0 out of 10 and critic Phillip Sherburne called this music "smoldering, sophisticated songs [that] get a little more cosmic while retaining their characteristic wit and charm" in an album "peppered with... dazzling images and unexpected counterpoints". Writing for PopMatters, Peter Thomas Webb scored this release an 8 out of 10, noting "cosmic meditations" and "dark Americana [that] frames stark fatalism" in the music.

The Skinny's Noah Barker gave this album 5 out of 5 stars, stating that "the record [displays] that grief and anticipatory awe can exist as a singular emotion, in a blip on the cosmic scale; the overwhelming ego death of human self-importance and the perfect realisation of its own in-spite beauty, that love and death are on the same spectrum. What a world we live in where a stranger can be your light and your shadow, one often because of the other. We meander like the rock beneath our feet, hurtling without trajectory, but enraptured by invented, triumphant purpose, simply because there's nothing more perfect to do than love and die." In Slant Magazine, Jeromy Winograd rated this work 4 out of 5 stars for including music that has a "unique pop alchemy, carefully balancing world-weariness and euphoria" that shows that "beauty can be found anywhere if you're willing to look for it". In Spin, Madelyn Dawson wrote that "one of the more surprising things about My Light, My Destroyer is just how much fun it has" and that "it's not afraid to be unserious, even despite its gravity". Sunnyvale of Sputnikmusic scored My Light, My Destroyer a 4.0 out of 5, calling it "a very, very, very good album" with the minor criticism that it is unfocused, but the "unwieldiness" of the music still results in "an absolutely gorgeous record". Editors at Stereogum chose this for Album of the Week and critic Chris DeVille praised Jenkins' ability to slowly unfold cosmic themes while discussing personal emotions, continuing that "in Jenkins' music, even the darkest moments are accented by the sense that comedy, beauty, and inspiration are always lurking".

Laura Barton of Uncut scored My Light, My Destroyer 4.5 out of 5 stars for balancing feelings of despair with "a fresh sense of hope" that confirms that Jenkins' previous music "no fluke" and this puts Jenkins in the company of songwriters such as Laurie Anderson, Aimee Mann, and Tom Petty. In Under the Radar, Andy Von Pip gave this release 8.5 out of 10 stars, writing that "Jenkins' gentle, mellifluous vocals cast a spell throughout, conveying a sense of beauty and wonder amidst the album's inherent contrasts". Writing in July for Variety, Jem Aswad called the album "such a leap forward that it vaults [Jenkins] into a whole different league" of musician for being "musically multi-dimensional and features intriguing arrangements" and "one of the best albums of the year so far".

=== Year-end lists ===
Select year-end rankings for My Light, My Destroyer
Publication/critic	Accolade	Rank	Ref.
Exclaim!	50 Best Albums of 2024	22	
Mojo	The Best Albums of 2024	14	
Rough Trade UK	Albums of the Year 2024	27	
Uncut	80 Best Albums of 2024	11	

== Track listing ==
All music and lyrics by Cassandra Jenkins, except where noted.

My Light, My Destroyer track listing
No.	Title	Writer(s)	Length
1.	"Devotion"		3:56
2.	"Clams Casino"	Andrew Lappin	3:26
3.	"Delphinium Blue"		3:37
4.	"Shatner's Theme"		0:44
5.	"Aurora, IL"		3:37
6.	"Betelgeuse"		2:54
7.	"Omakase"	Josh Kaufman	4:45
8.	"Music??"		0:10
9.	"Petco"	Ian Davis	3:03
10.	"Attente Téléphonique"	Kaufman; Matice Maino	1:31
11.	"Tape and Tissue"	Lappin	4:22
12.	"Only One"	Stephanie Marziano	3:09
13.	"Hayley"	Reid Jenkins	1:33
Total length:			36:52

Deluxe edition bonus disc

1. "It's Cassandra" (C. Jenkins) – 1:11
2. "Hailey, Hayley (Only One)" (music: C. Jenkins and R. Jenkins, lyrics and vocal melody: C. Jenkins) – 4:02
3. "Shatner's Redux" (C. Jenkins) – 2:51
4. "Stardust" (Hoagy Carmichael) – 6:44
5. "Oh, Enough!" (C. Jenkins) – 0:38

== Personnel ==
"Devotion"

- Cassandra Jenkins – horn arrangement, production
- Adam Ayan – audio mastering
- Jayk Cherry – assistant audio engineering
- Tyler Hicks – assistant audio engineering
- Josh Kaufman – horn arrangement
- Andrew Lappin – audio engineering, mixing, production
- Rob Moose – string arrangement
- Dave Nelson – horn arrangement

"Clams Casino"

- Cassandra Jenkins – production, vocal engineering, vocal production
- Adam Ayan – audio mastering
- Jess Belardi – assistant audio engineering
- Jannick Frampton – assistant mixing
- Tyler Hicks – assistant audio engineering
- Andrew Lappin – audio engineering, mixing, production
- Addie Vogt – assistant audio engineering
- Katie Von Schleicher – vocal engineering, vocal production

"Delphinium Blue"

- Cassandra Jenkins – production
- Adam Ayan – audio mastering
- Andrew Lappin – audio engineering, mixing, production
- Molly Lewis – whistling engineering

"Shatner's Theme"

- Cassandra Jenkins – field recording, production
- Adam Ayan – audio mastering
- Andrew Lappin – audio engineering, mixing, production
- Molly Lewis – whistling engineering

"Aurora, IL"

- Cassandra Jenkins – additional vocal engineering, production
- Adam Ayan – audio mastering
- Michael Coleman – synthesizer engineering
- Isaiah Gage – additional string arrangement, additional string engineering
- Tyler Hicks – assistant audio engineering
- Reid Jenkins – additional string arrangement, additional string engineering
- Andrew Lappin – audio engineering, mixing, production
- Rob Moose – string arrangement, string engineering

"Betelgeuse"

- Cassandra Jenkins – field recording, piano engineering, production
- Adam Ayan – audio mastering
- Jayk Cherry – assistant mixing
- Timothy Cleary – additional engineering
- Michael Coleman – piano engineering
- Andrew Lappin – mixing, production

"Omakase"

- Cassandra Jenkins – additional arrangement, vocal engineering, production
- Adam Ayan – audio mastering
- Jannick Frampton – assistant mixing
- Josh Kaufman – additional engineering, mixing, production
- Andrew Lappin – audio engineering, production
- Lilah Larson – additional guitar engineering
- Rob Moose – string arrangement, string engineering
- Jonny Schenke – additional arrangement, additional editing

"Music??"

- Cassandra Jenkins – field recording
- Adam Ayan – audio mastering
- Andrew Lappin – mixing

"Petco"

- Cassandra Jenkins – vocal engineering, vocal production, production
- Adam Ayan – audio mastering
- Jannick Frampton – assistant mixing
- Tyler Hicks – assistant audio engineering
- Andrew Lappin – audio engineering, mixing, production
- Katie Von Schleicher – vocal engineering, vocal production

"Attente Téléphonique"

- Cassandra Jenkins – field recording, additional arrangement, production
- Adam Ayan – audio mastering
- Reid Jenkins – vocal engineering
- Josh Kaufman – audio engineering, production
- Andrew Lappin – audio engineering, mixing, production
- Jonny Schenke – additional arrangement

"Tape and Tissue"

- Cassandra Jenkins – field recording, additional arrangement, production
- Jayk Cherry – assistant audio engineering
- Michael Coleman – audio engineering
- Andrew Lappin – horn arrangement, audio engineering, mixing, production
- Jesse McGinty – horn arrangement

"Only One"

- Cassandra Jenkins – horn arrangement
- Adam Ayan – audio mastering
- Jess Belardi – assistant audio engineering
- Michael Coleman – assistant audio engineering, additional audio engineering
- Jannick Frampton – assistant mixing
- Tyler Hicks – assistant audio engineering
- Andrew Lappin – horn arrangement, mixing
- Jesse McGinty – horn arrangement
- Addie Vogt – assistant audio engineering

"Hayley"

- Cassandra Jenkins – production
- Adam Ayan – audio mastering
- Reid Jenkins – string arrangement, audio engineering
- Andrew Lappin – mixing, production

"It's Cassandra"

Mixing and mastering at WaxLTD, Los Angeles, California, United States

- Cassandra Jenkins – sound design, field recordings
- Meg Duffy – sound design
- Andrew Lappin – mixing, mastering

"Hailey, Hayley (Only One)"

Recorded at ChanTerrelle Sound, New York City, New York, United States; mixing and mastering at WaxLTD, Los Angeles, California, United States

- Cassandra Jenkins – vocals, vocal engineering, production
- Hailey Benton Gates – spoken word
- Isaiah Gage – cello, string arrangement, string engineering
- Reid Jenkins – violin
- Andrew Lappin – mixing, production, mastering

"Shatner's Redux"

Recorded at Figure 8, Brooklyn, New York City, New York, United States; WaxLTD, Los Angeles, California, United States; and Balcony Pictures Entertainment, Paris, France

- Cassandra Jenkins – sound design, field recordings, field recording engineering, production
- Meg Duffy – sound design
- Andrew Lappin – engineering, production, mixing, mastering
- Molly Lewis – whistling, whistling engineering

"Stardust"

Recorded at Figure 8, Brooklyn, New York City, New York, United States; mixing and mastering at WaxLTD, Los Angeles, California, United States

- Cassandra Jenkins – field recordings, production
- Michael Coleman – piano
- Eli Crews – EWI, engineering
- Shahzad Ismaily – drums
- Andrew Lappin – mixing, mastering
- Ron Shalom – bass guitar

"Oh, Enough!"

Mixing and mastering at WaxLTD, Los Angeles, California, United States

- Cassandra Jenkins – sound design, field recordings
- Meg Duffy – sound design
- Andrew Lappin – mixing, mastering

Additional musicians

- Zoë Brecher
- Meg Duffy
- Isaac Eiger
- Hailey Benton Gates
- El Kempner
- Stephanie Marziano
- Daniel McDowell
- Katie Von Schleicher

Graphics

- Cassandra Jenkins – creative direction
- Tomás Andonie – photography
- Wyndham Garnett – photography
- Nick Scott – art direction, design
- Tonje Thilesen – photography

== Chart performance ==
This was the first album of Jenkins' to chart in the United Kingdom.

2024 chart performance for My Light, My Destroyer
Chart	Peak
Scottish Albums Chart	5
UK Americana Chart Update	3
UK Albums (Official Charts)	67
UK Albums Chart Update	15
UK Albums Downloads Chart Update	15
UK Albums Physical Chart Update	7
UK Albums Sales Update	8
UK Independent Albums Breaker Chart	1
UK Independent Albums Chart	3
UK Record Store Chart Update	4
UK Vinyl Albums Chart Update	6

== See also ==
- 2024 in American music
- List of 2024 albums
