= Live at The Record Exchange EP =

Live at The Record Exchange

EP by Josh Ritter
- Released: January 23, 2007
- Recorded: The Record Exchange, Boise, ID
- Genre: Folk rock; Americana
- Length: 19:57
- Label: Megaphon

Josh Ritter chronology
Good Man EP (2006)	Live at The Record Exchange (2007)	The Historical Conquests of Josh Ritter (2007)

Live at The Record Exchange is an acoustic EP by American singer-songwriter Josh Ritter. It was recorded at the Record Exchange in Boise, Idaho on August 19, 2006. The EP features three songs from Ritter's 2006 album The Animal Years, two previously unreleased songs and a John Prine cover.

== Track listing ==
All songs written by Josh Ritter, except "Daddy's Little Pumpkin" written by Pat McLaughlin and John Prine.

1. "Peter Killed the Dragon" – 2:21
2. "Girl in the War" – 4:15
3. "Good Man" – 4:06
4. "Bandits" – 2:46
5. "Daddy's Little Pumpkin" – 2:19
6. "Wolves" – 4:10

== Personnel ==
=== Musicians ===
- Josh Ritter – vocals and guitar

=== Production ===
- Mixed by Jason Ringelstetter
- Mastered by Glenn Meadows
