= Parsonsfield (band) =

American multi-genre band

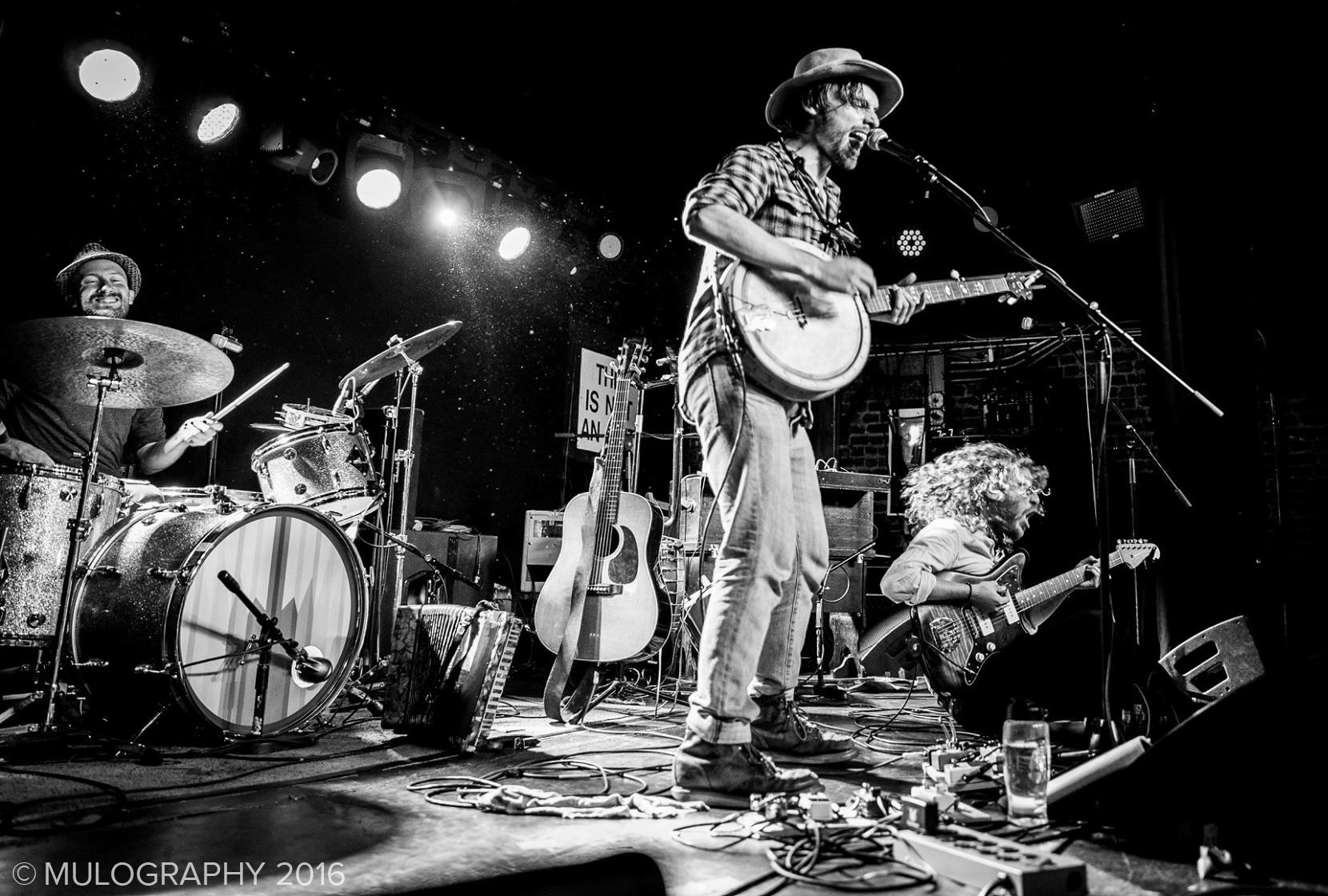
- Parsonsfield in New York City, 2016

Background information
- Origin: Mansfield, Connecticut Somerville, Massachusetts
- Genres: Folk, rock
- Years active: 2011–present
- Labels: Signature Sounds
- Members: Antonio Alcorn; Chris Freeman; Erik Hischmann; Max Shakun
- Website: parsonsfield.com

Parsonsfield is a multi-genre band founded in 2011 in Mansfield, Connecticut. The band consists of Chris Freeman, Antonio Alcorn, Max Shakun, and Erik Hischmann. The original members met while attending the University of Connecticut. The name comes from the town of Parsonsfield, Maine, where they recorded their debut album. The band tours in the USA and Canada from their base in Somerville, Massachusetts.

== History ==
=== Beginnings ===
The band began as an offshoot of the university's folk music club. Chris Freeman, Antonio Alcorn, and others met weekly in the student union to play traditional music. The gatherings were open to anyone, and didn't hold any performances, through a misunderstanding, members of the club were offered an opening set at Toad's Place in New Haven, Connecticut. Freeman and Alcorn put together an impromptu band, and soon recruited music students Harrison Goodale (bass) and Max Shakun (guitar) to continue playing shows. The band was also invited to perform at a band competition at the Podunk Bluegrass Festival in August 2012 where they won fan favorite award. They recorded and sold Cd's in very limited numbers.

=== Career ===
In 2013 the band signed to Signature Sounds Recordings and released their self-titled debut album, Poor Old Shine, produced and recorded by Sam Kassirer (Josh Ritter, Lake Street Dive, Langhorne Slim) in Parsonsfield, Maine. Erik Hischmann, the session drummer hired for the album, joined the band soon after recording was completed.

In July 2014 the band changed its name to Parsonsfield. The following month marked the band's second studio release, Afterparty EP, featuring covers of songs by Mississippi John Hurt, Bert Jansch, and Huey Lewis and the News, as well as traditional songs and one original.

In September 2016 the band released its third studio album, Blooming Through The Black, also produced by Sam Kassirer (Josh Ritter, Lake Street Dive, Langhorne Slim), and recorded in Collinsville, CT in an abandoned axe factory on the banks of the Farmington River.

In March 2018, Parsonsfield released their fourth studio album, WE - produced by Dan Cardinal (Josh Ritter, The Low Anthem, Darlingside) and recorded at Dimension Sound Studios in Boston, MA. This marks their first time recording in a traditional studio. The first single, "Kick Out The Windows" was released in February with a companion video, which premiered by American Songwriter.

In December 2018, Goodale left the band. In early 2021, Max and Erik left the band.

=== Film, television and theater ===
In winter 2013, and winter 2014–spring 2015, Parsonsfield wrote and performed an original soundtrack to The Heart of Robin Hood, a theatrical production playing eight shows per week in Cambridge, Winnipeg, and Toronto. After returning from Canada, the band relocated to Leverett, Massachusetts.

In March 2016 Weeds or Wildflowers, track 1 on Poor Old Shine, was featured on AMC's The Walking Dead (Season 6, Episode 12: "Not Tomorrow Yet").

In September 2016, Parsonsfield wrote and performed an original score for the 1922 silent documentary Nanook of the North.

== Current members ==
In live performances, members of the band all sing, and often switch instruments and trade places on stage. Besides their primary instruments, various members play saw, synthesizer, glockenspiel, melodica, and auxiliary percussion.

- Chris Freeman – banjo, guitar, pump organ, bass, lead vocals
- Antonio Alcorn – mandolin, banjo, bass, vocals

== Previous Members ==
- Max Shakun – guitar, pump organ, synthesizer, bass, vocals
- Erik Hischmann – drums, bass, vocals
- Harrison Goodale – bass

== Other work ==
Hischmann (drums) is credited as assistant engineer for The Beast In Its Tracks (Josh Ritter), Bad Self Portraits (Lake Street Dive), and various other albums including Poor Old Shine.

== Discography ==
=== Studio albums ===
Poor Old Shine (2013)
| No. | Title | Writer(s) | Publisher | Length |
|---|---|---|---|---|
| 1. | "Weeds Or Wildflowers" | Parsonsfield | Parsonsfield, LLC (BMI) | 2:52 |
| 2. | "Footsteps In My Ear" | Parsonsfield | Parsonsfield, LLC (BMI) | 3:09 |
| 3. | "Country Pocket" | Parsonsfield | Parsonsfield, LLC (BMI) | 3:35 |
| 4. | "Ghosts Next Door" | Parsonsfield | Parsonsfield, LLC (BMI) | 3:30 |
| 5. | "Punching The Air" | Parsonsfield | Parsonsfield, LLC (BMI) | 4:22 |
| 6. | "Right Now" | Parsonsfield | Parsonsfield, LLC (BMI) | 3:38 |
| 7. | "Empty Rocking Chair" | Parsonsfield | Parsonsfield, LLC (BMI) | 3:49 |
| 8. | "The Hurry All Around" | Parsonsfield | Parsonsfield, LLC (BMI) | 4:05 |
| 9. | "Love Song" | Parsonsfield | Parsonsfield, LLC (BMI) | 4:07 |
| 10. | "Tear Down The Stage" | Parsonsfield | Parsonsfield, LLC (BMI) | 4:50 |
| Total length: | | | | 36:56 |

Afterparty (2014)
| No. | Title | Writer(s) | Publisher | Length |
|---|---|---|---|---|
| 1. | "Let The Mermaids Flirt With Me" | Mississippi John Hurt | Zap Music Publishing (BMI) | 3:59 |
| 2. | "Strollin' Down The Highway" | Bert Jansch | Universal Music Publishing (BMI) | 3:39 |
| 3. | "Anita, Your Lovin'" | Parsonsfield | Parsonsfield, LLC (BMI) | 3:11 |
| 4. | "The Power of Love" | John Colla, Hugh Cregg, Chris Hayes | Cause & Effect Music, Kinda Blue Music, Huey Lewis Music | 3:19 |
| 5. | "Hang Me" | Traditional / Last Verse written by Jonah Tolchin | | 3:10 |
| 6. | "Lay Some Flowers On My Grave" | Traditional | | 5:49 |
| Total length: | | | | 23:07 |

Blooming Through The Black (2016)
| No. | Title | Writer(s) | Publisher | Length |
|---|---|---|---|---|
| 1. | "Stronger" | Parsonsfield | Parsonsfield, LLC (BMI) | 3:33 |
| 2. | "Blooming Through The Black" | Parsonsfield | Parsonsfield, LLC (BMI) | 3:26 |
| 3. | "Across Your Mind" | Parsonsfield | Parsonsfield, LLC (BMI) | 3:44 |
| 4. | "Water Through A Mill" | Parsonsfield | Parsonsfield, LLC (BMI) | 3:41 |
| 5. | "Barbed Wire" | Parsonsfield | Parsonsfield, LLC (BMI) | 4:22 |
| 6. | "Ties That Bind Us" | Parsonsfield | Parsonsfield, LLC (BMI) | 2:59 |
| 7. | "Don't Get Excited" | Parsonsfield | Parsonsfield, LLC (BMI) | 3:52 |
| 8. | "Everyone Dies" | Parsonsfield | Parsonsfield, LLC (BMI) | 3:50 |
| 9. | "Mental Remedy" | Parsonsfield | Parsonsfield, LLC (BMI) | 3:00 |
| 10. | "Hot Air Balloon" | Parsonsfield | Parsonsfield, LLC (BMI) | 3:18 |
| Total length: | | | | 35:45 |

WE (2018)
| No. | Title | Writer(s) | Publisher | Length |
|---|---|---|---|---|
| 1. | "Light of the City" | Parsonsfield | Parsonsfield, LLC (BMI) | 4:09 |
| 2. | "Go Find Yourself" | Parsonsfield | Parsonsfield, LLC (BMI) | 3:30 |
| 3. | "Santa Monica" | Art Alexakis, Greg Eklund, Craig Montoya | Irving Music Inc | 3:38 |
| 4. | "Take Me Back" | Parsonsfield | Parsonsfield, LLC (BMI) | 3:46 |
| 5. | "Kick Out the Windows" | Parsonsfield | Parsonsfield, LLC (BMI) | 3:48 |
| Total length: | | | | 18:51 |

=== Singles ===
| Year | Single | Writer(s) | Publisher(s) | Album |
|---|---|---|---|---|
| 2016 | "Ktaadn" | Parsonsfield | Parsonsfield, LLC (BMI) | Ktaadn - Single |
| 2016 | "Stronger" | Parsonsfield | Parsonsfield, LLC (BMI) | Blooming Through The Black |
| 2016 | "Barbed Wire" | Parsonsfield | Parsonsfield, LLC (BMI) | Blooming Through The Black |
| 2016 | "Everyone Dies" | Parsonsfield | Parsonsfield, LLC (BMI) | Blooming Through The Black |
| 2018 | "Kick Out the Windows" | Parsonsfield | Parsonsfield, LLC (BMI) | WE |
