= Josh Kaufman (musician) =

American musician (born 1978)

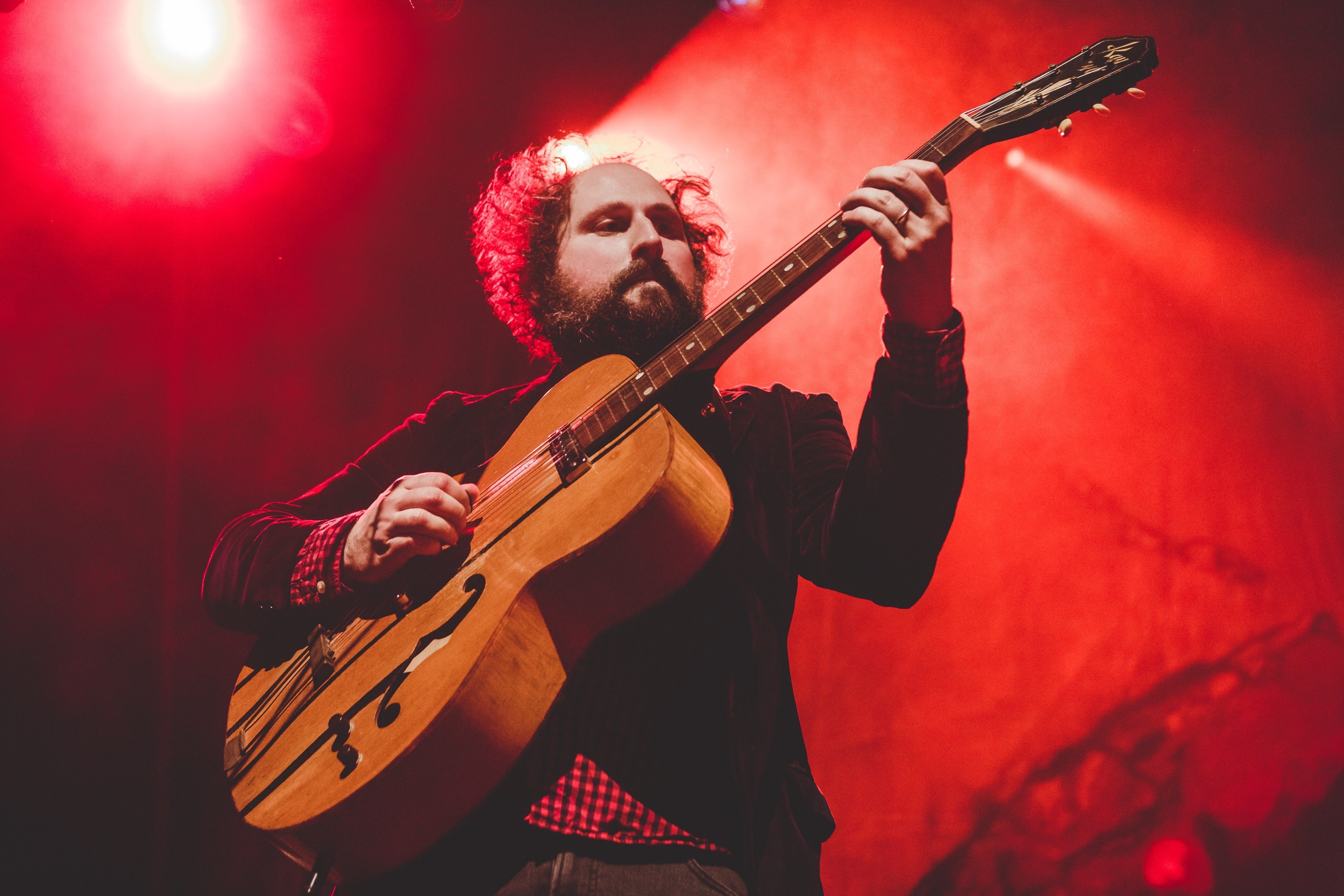

Background information
- Born: Joshua David Kaufman; May 26, 1978 (age 48); Paterson, New Jersey, U.S.
- Occupations: Multi-instrumentalist, songwriter, arranger, producer
- Instruments: Guitar, baritone guitar, pedal steel, electric mandolin, tenor banjo, bass, keyboards, drums

Josh Kaufman (born May 26, 1978) is an American multi-instrumentalist, songwriter, producer, composer, arranger and engineer based in Kingston, New York. He is a member of the collaborative ensembles Muzz and Bonny Light Horseman. He was previously a member of the band Down Home Souls.

== New York ==
Kaufman began playing in high school garage bands in New York. Largely self-taught, he decided to take music theory lessons in his senior year at high school in preparation for studying music at Third Level. After graduating, Kaufman enrolled in the State University of New York (SUNY) in New Paltz, NY. There, he worked at The Main Street Bistro as well as Jack's Rhythms record store, and frequently made visits down to New York City. During this time, Kaufman was playing in bands such as Pooja and Follow The Lieder, as well as making recordings with long-time partner (and now wife) Annie Nero.

Kaufman moved to Brooklyn after university and worked as barista while playing in various musical projects performing originals and covers. He reunited with Paul Banks for an acoustic duo just as Interpol were gaining popularity and the garage rock revival was emerging. Meanwhile, Kaufman's friendship with the songwriter Benji Cossa resulted in a stint working at a SoHo printing press. This brought him a steady income while allowing flexibility for the growing amount of touring, production and arranging work that he was doing for artists such as Dawn Landes, Josh Ritter and The National.

=== Josh Ritter ===
Kaufman became a sideman for Dawn Landes and toured regularly across the US and Europe with the singer-songwriter. Kaufman befriended Landes’ then-husband Josh Ritter and the pair began collaborating, culminating in Kaufman producing and playing most of the instrumentation on Ritter's Bringing In The Darlings EP in 2012. Kaufman would also contribute guitar, electric guitar, bass, percussion and vocals as part of Ritter's core studio team for his 2013 LP The Beast In Its Tracks and become a lynchpin of Ritter's live backing group, the Royal City Band.

=== Bob Weir and Day of the Dead ===
While gigging around New York in venues such as The Living Room and the Knitting Factory, Kaufman met Bryan Devendorf of the National who were fans of Kaufman's band Follow the Lieder. As well as assisting with the recording of Boxer, in March 2012 Kaufman was invited by the band to act as musical director for a one-off ensemble performance with Grateful Dead founder Bob Weir and a host of big names from the US indie scene (including Walt Martin of the Walkmen and Thomas Bartlett under the title "The Bridge Session".

In August of that year, Kaufman was invited to be part of a tribute concert led by Weir entitled "Move Me Brightly: Celebrating Jerry Garcia's 70th Birthday". The performance took place at TRI Studios in San Rafael, California and was filmed for release as a music documentary entitled Move Me Brightly.

We had a new band every day, and Josh Kaufman was the magical factor that would put the glue in the groove. He knew these guys, he knew what to expect, he knew they were gonna work, he knew they were gonna plug in. And each day in the studio was a different deal: 'OK, we’re gonna do this song and this song, and these are the guys we’re plugging in and we’ll just see what happens.' He’s a real good puppet master and, at the same time, he’s dancing on the end of the strings on some songs. It worked out real well for us and, generally speaking, that got the job done.

— Bob Weir on recording with Josh Kaufman

Subsequent to this outing, Kaufman was brought in to co-produce Day of the Dead, an elaborate Grateful Dead charity tribute album with Bryce and Aaron Dessner. Released in May 2016, the 59-track compilation was recorded over four years and featured a host of big names reinterpreting the Grateful Dead songbook, including Wilco, the War on Drugs, the National, Bonnie "Prince" Billy (Will Oldham), Jenny Lewis, Lucinda Williams, Mumford & Sons, Perfume Genius, Lisa Hannigan, the Flaming Lips and Bill Callahan. Proceeds from the sales of the album were donated to the Red Hot Organization.

On the back of the release, Kaufman performed a special live performance of the album at the second annual Eaux Claires Music & Arts Festival as part of a supergroup of various acts who had appeared on the record, including Bon Iver (Justin Vernon), Jenny Lewis, Will Oldham, Matt Berninger and Sam Amidon.

In late 2015, Bob Weir revealed in an interview that he was writing songs with Kaufman and Josh Ritter for a project that had come about after Kaufman encouraged Weir to revisit the fireside songs and cowboy spirit of his teenage ranch years in Wyoming. On August 4, 2016, it was announced that Bob Weir would release his first solo album in almost 40 years on September 30, entitled Blue Mountain. The album would be produced by Kaufman and feature contributions from Josh Ritter, Scott Devendorf, Aaron Dessner, Bryce Dessner, Dawn Landes and many others. An 11-date tour featuring a backing band made up of Kaufman and members of The National was also announced.

=== Craig Finn and the Hold Steady ===
Josh has helped me a great deal in moving forward as an artist. He has an incredible ability to quickly find what part of a song is compelling. He’s able to bring out the best in me, and to improve my songs while maintaining the qualities that make them personal to me.

— Craig Finn on working with Josh Kaufman

While working in a record store in the early 2000s, Kaufman encountered the music of the Twin Cities rock band, Lifter Puller. Many years later, in 2012, Kaufman was backing Hannah Cohen during an appearance at Crossing Border Festival in The Hague, the Netherlands. Craig Finn, frontman of Lifter Puller and more recently the Hold Steady, was on the same bill performing solo material. After watching Cohen's set, Finn approached Kaufman about collaborating and the pair reunited back in the US at Kaufman's studio in Dumbo. There, they worked together on music for a production of Scott Z. Burns' play The Library before Finn lined up Kaufman to produce two solo studio albums, Faith in the Future (2015) and We All Want the Same Things (2017).

In March 2018, the Hold Steady unveiled two new tracks, “Eureka” and “Esther” which had been recorded with Kaufman in Brooklyn. Kaufman is collaborating with the group on further recordings.

An announcement in late January 2019 revealed that Kaufman had produced a third solo record with Finn. I Need a New War was released on April 26 in the US on Partisan Records. In an interview with The 405, Finn revealed that Kaufman had been "very hands-on for these records", saying: "We really talk through the songs... He's helped me a lot." To mark the album's release, Kaufman appeared with Finn on Late Night with Seth Meyers for a rendition of lead single ‘Something To Hope For’. Though his work with Finn, he also bonded with drummer Joe Russo leading to the formation of their free-form group Boyfriends.

=== Bonny Light Horseman ===
As of 2019, Kaufman was part of a three-piece band, Bonny Light Horseman, consisting of himself, Eric D. Johnson of Fruit Bats and singer/songwriter Anaïs Mitchell. Their self-titled 2021 album was nominated for 2 Grammy awards.The band released their third album in June 2024.

=== Muzz ===
On March 6, 2020, it was announced that Kaufman would be joining Paul Banks and Matt Barrick to form a new band, Muzz. The band also released their first single, "Bad Feeling."

=== Taylor Swift ===
Kaufman collaborated with Taylor Swift on her album Folklore, playing harmonica, electric guitar, and lap steel guitar on the song "Betty". He also collaborated on her album Evermore, playing lap steel, harmonica, and mandolin on "Evermore", "Cowboy like Me", "Ivy", and "Willow". In 2021, he collaborated on Red (Taylor's Version), playing electric and acoustic guitars, mandolin, and harmonica on the songs Better Man (Taylor's Version), I Bet You Think About Me, and "Run".

=== I'm with Her ===
The folk supergroup I'm with Her, consisting of musicians Sarah Jarosz, Aoife O'Donovan and Sara Watkins asked Kaufman to produce their 2025 album Wild & Clear & Blue for which they won the 2026 Grammy for best folk album.

== Selected discography ==
=== As producer/co-producer ===
- I'm with Her, Wild & Clear & Blue (2025)
- Mary Chapin Carpenter, Julie Fowlis, Karine Polwart, Looking for the Thread (2025)
- Jenny Owen Youngs, Avalanche (2023)
- Cassandra Jenkins, An Overview on Phenomenal Nature (2021)
- The Hold Steady, Open Door Policy (2021)
- Muzz, "Muzz" (2020)
- Bonny Light Horseman, "Bonny Light Horseman" (2020)
- This Is the Kit, "Off Off On" (2020)
- The Hold Steady, "Thrashing Through The Passion" (2019)
- The Hold Steady, "Eureka" b/w "Esther" single (2017) – also percussion
- The Hold Steady, “Entitlement Crew” b/w “A Snake In The Shower” single (2017) – also organ and orchestra Bells
- Craig Finn, We All Want The Same Things LP (2017, Partisan Records) - also vocals, guitar, mandolin, piano, organ, synthesizer, synthesizer bass, bass, overdub engineer
- Bob Weir, Blue Mountain LP (2016, Sony Legacy) - also composer, engineer, bass, casio, drums, farfisa organ, guitars, mandolin, organ, pedal steel, piano, synthesizer, tenor banjo, vocals, wurlitzer piano
- Various artists, Day of The Dead LP (2016, 4AD) - also bass, vocals, guitars, organ, piano, synthesizer
- Craig Finn, Faith In The Future LP (2015, Partisan Records) - also vocals, guitar, piano, keyboards, bass
- Craig Finn, Newmyer's Roof EP (2015, Partisan Records)
- David Wax Museum, Guesthouse LP (2015, Thirty Tigers) - also engineer, mixing, vocals, guitars, piano, synthesizer, bass, percussion, organ, leona
- David Wax Museum, Knock Knock Get Up LP (2013, Thirty Tigers)
- Josh Ritter, Bringing In The Darlings EP (2012, Pytheas Recordings) – also plays most instrumentation
- Caithlin De Marrais, Red Coats LP (2011, End Up Records)
- Caithlin DeMarrais, My Magic City LP (2008, End Up Records)
- Secret Dakota Ring, Cantarell LP (2008, Serious Business Records) – also composer, bass, glockenspiel, guitar, harmonium, percussion, piano, string arrangements

=== As musician, composer, arranger, songwriter ===
- The War on Drugs, A Deeper Understanding LP (2017, Atlantic) – (as “Josh Kauffman”) electric guitar, vocals on “In Chains”, electric guitar on “You Don't Have To Go”
- The National, Sleep Well Beast LP (2017, 4AD) – guitars
- Josh Ritter, Gathering LP (2017, Pytheas Recordings) – guitar, synthesizer
- Hiss Golden Messenger, Hallelujah Anyhow LP (2017, Merge) -- Electric and acoustic guitars, mandolin
- Lisa Hannigan, At Swim LP (2016, PIAS Records) – electric guitar on “Snow”
- Josh Ritter, Sermon On The Rocks LP (2015, Pytheas Recordings) – acoustic, electric, 12-string Rickenbacker, slide guitar, electric mandolin, bongos, vocals
- Josh Ritter, Acoustic Live Vol. 1: Somerville Theater / Somerville, Mass live LP (2015, Pytheas Recordings) – electric guitar, nylon-string guitar, vocals
- Various artists, This Is The Town (A Tribute To Nilsson Volume 1) compilation LP (2014, The Royal Potato Family) – clavinet, guitar, guitar (acoustic), mixing, organ, standup bass, vocals
- Dawn Landes, Bluebird LP (2014, Western Vinyl) – bass, piano, vocals
- Various artists, Bob Dylan in the 80s: Volume One compilation LP (2014, ATO) – guitar, organ
- Trixie Whitley, Fourth Corner LP (2013, Unday Records) – bass, guitar
- Yellowbirds, Songs From The Vanished Frontier LP (2013, The Royal Potato Family) – guitar, organ, vocals
- Josh Ritter, The Beast in Its Tracks LP (2013, Pytheas Recordings) – guitar, electric guitar, bass, percussion, vocals
- Various artists, If A Lot of Bands Play in the Woods... compilation LP (2011, Tarquin) – accompanying The National, on “Twenty Miles To NH (Part 2)”
- Dawn Landes, Sweet Heart Rodeo LP (2009, Cooking Vinyl) – composer, guitars, organ, piano, vocals
- Taylor Swift, Red (Taylor's Version) LP (2021, Republic Records) – electric and acoustic guitars, mandolin, harmonica
- Taylor Swift, Speak Now (Taylor's Version) LP (2023, Republic Records) – electric guitar, organ, piano, acoustic guitar, banjo, keyboards, synthesizer

== Film work ==
- Paper Man (2009, feature film) – Arranger and Co-producer with Mark McAdam, pump organ, lap steel, autoharp, guitar
- Move Me Brightly (2013, concert film) – musician

== Other collaborations ==
- The Bridge Sessions w/ Bob Weir and members of The National – musical director
- The Complete Last Waltz (2012, 2013, 2014, live show) – core band member
