= Haley Tanner =

American writer and novelist (born 1981)

- Born: 1981 (age 43–44)
- Education: Clark University, The New School
- Occupation: Author
- Website: haleytanner.com

Haley Tanner is an American writer and novelist.

== Literary career ==
Tanner's first novel, Vaclav & Lena, was published by Random House in 2011. The titular characters are growing up in Brooklyn's Russian immigrant community.

She has been interviewed by The Forward and NPR.

== Personal life ==
Tanner was born and raised in Westchester County, New York. She holds an MFA in creative writing from The New School.

Tanner and her partner, musician Josh Ritter, had their first child, Beatrix Wendylove Ritter, on November 11, 2012. They own a home together in Woodstock, New York.

== Awards and honors ==
The National Book Foundation named Tanner as a "5 Under 35 Author" in 2012.

== Publications ==
- Tanner, Haley (17 May 2011). Vaclav and Lena. Knopf Canada. ISBN 9780307399359.
