= Move Me Brightly =

2013 film directed by Justin Kreutzmann

- DVD cover
- Directed by: Justin Kreutzmann
- Produced by: Matt Busch; Laurence Freedman; Chris McCutcheon; Justin Kreutzmann
- Starring: Bob Weir; Neal Casal; Jeff Chimenti; Mike Gordon; Joe Russo; Donna Jean Godchaux; Jon Graboff
- Edited by: Justin Kreutzmann
- Production company: TRI Studios
- Distributed by: Eagle Rock Entertainment
- Release date: October 29, 2013
- Running time: 129 minutes DVD 159 minutes Blu-ray 189 minutes
- Country: United States
- Language: English

Move Me Brightly is a music documentary film. It contains live performances of Grateful Dead songs from a 2012 concert by Bob Weir and a number of other musicians, called "Move Me Brightly: Celebrating Jerry Garcia's 70th Birthday". The film also includes interviews with some of the performers, other musicians, and members of the Grateful Dead extended family. It was released on DVD and Blu-ray in 2013.

Move Me Brightly was directed by Justin Kreutzmann, the son of Grateful Dead drummer Bill Kreutzmann. Many of the interviews were conducted by Luke Wilson. The music was produced and mixed by Rick Vargas, with live mixing by Dennis Leonard and audio mastering by David Glasser. The liner notes for the video were written by Mike Campbell, Benjy Eisen, and David Crosby.

== Concert ==
On August 3, 2012, former Grateful Dead guitarist Bob Weir and a rotating lineup of musicians performed a five-hour concert of Grateful Dead songs at TRI Studios in San Rafael, California. The show was called "Move Me Brightly: Celebrating Jerry Garcia's 70th Birthday", and took place two days after the 70th anniversary of Garcia's birth. Many of the songs featured Weir on guitar, Neal Casal (from Ryan Adams & the Cardinals) on guitar, Jeff Chimenti (RatDog, Furthur) on keyboards, Mike Gordon (Phish) on bass, Joe Russo (Phil Lesh and Friends, Furthur) on drums, Donna Jean Godchaux (Grateful Dead) on vocals, and Jon Graboff (Ryan Adams & the Cardinals) on pedal steel guitar. Also performing at the concert were Phil Lesh, Jim Lauderdale, Harper Simon, Cass McCombs, Sam Cohen, Josh Kaufman, Adam MacDougall, Jason Roberts, Jonathan Wilson, Chris Tomson, Tad Kubler, and Craig Finn.

== Songs ==
The DVD and Blu-ray release of Move Me Brightly includes the following songs.

Film:

- "Cumberland Blues"
- "Goin' Down the Road Feelin' Bad"
- "Mission in the Rain"
- "Shakedown Street"
- "He's Gone"
- "Eyes of the World"
- "Terrapin Station"
- "Days Between"
- "Franklin's Tower"
- "U.S. Blues"

Bonus performances:

- "Dupree's Diamond Blues" *
- "Friend of the Devil"
- "Tennessee Jed" *
- "Ship of Fools" *
- "Bird Song"
- "New Speedway Boogie"

*Blu-ray only

== Featuring ==
The following people are listed in the "featuring" section of the film credits. They and others are interviewed in the film.

- Bob Weir
- Phil Lesh
- Bill Kreutzmann
- Mickey Hart
- Donna Jean Godchaux
- Mike Gordon
- Jeff Chimenti
- Joe Russo
- Neal Casal
- Carlos Santana
- Josh Kaufman
- Sammy Hagar
- Perry Farrell
- Mike Campbell
- David Hidalgo
- John Doe
- Stephen Perkins
- Dave Schools
- Bill Walton
- Jorma Kaukonen
- Jack Casady

== Setlist ==
The full set-list from the show is as follows: ( * indicates it was featured in Move Me Brightly DVD or Blu-Ray.)

1. The Wheel>
2. Cumberland Blues *
3. Loser
4. Mississippi Half Step
5. Dire Wolf
6. Dupree's Diamond Blues *
7. Tennessee Jed *
8. Ship of Fools *
9. They Love Each Other
10. Bird Song *
11. New Speedway Boogie *
12. Loose Lucy
13. Friend Of The Devil *
14. Mission In The Rain *
15. Ramble On Rose
16. Catfish John
17. Shakedown Street *
18. Terrapin Station*
19. He's Gone *
20. Eyes Of The World *
21. Scarlet Begonias
22. Don't Let Go
23. Day's Between *
24. Franklin's Tower *
25. U.S Blues *
26. Goin down The Road Feelin' Bad *
27. Ripple
