= The Beast in Its Tracks =

Studio album by Josh Ritter
- Released: March 5, 2013
- Recorded: The Great North Sound Society, Maine; Saltlands Studios, Brooklyn, New York, United States
- Genre: Folk rock; Americana
- Length: 43:22
- Label: Pytheas Recordings
- Producer: Sam Kassirer

Josh Ritter chronology
Bringing in the Darlings (2012)	The Beast in Its Tracks (2013)	Josh Ritter – Acoustic Live Vol. 1: Somerville Theater/Somerville, Mass (2015)

Singles from The Beast in Its Tracks
- 1. "Joy to You Baby" Released: December 11, 2012; 2. "Hopeful" Released: June 25, 2013

The Beast in Its Tracks is the seventh studio album by American singer-songwriter Josh Ritter. It was released on March 5, 2013.

== Background and production ==
On April 17, 2010, American singer-songwriter Josh Ritter released his sixth full-length studio album, So Runs the World Away. This was followed by a live album, Live at The Iveagh Gardens, in December 2011, as well as two extended plays, To the Yet Unknowing World (2011) and Bringing in the Darlings (2012).

The album was written and recorded over a period of 18 months, with much of the initial material discarded. Ritter says that, "The first couple months after everything came crashing down, I was so filled with rage and manic energy. I wanted to record," but that the songs that came out of that period were "forced".

Ritter recorded the album at The Great North Sound Society in Maine with producer Sam Kassirer, who started working with the artist on 2007's The Historical Conquests of Josh Ritter, and who also played keyboard in Ritter's Royal City Band. Ritter credits Kassirer with helping him achieve catharsis, saying that he was putting too much pressure on himself at the start of the recording process, and that Kassirer said, "We're going to put a microphone in front of you, record it, and get it all out there. Don't worry about what you want to cut."

== Themes and composition ==
The Beast in Its Tracks has been compared to Beck's 2002 album Sea Change, also inspired by the end of a long-term relationship, and Bob Dylan's autobiographical Blood on the Tracks. Ritter, who had previously shied away from writing autobiographical music, told CBS News that, when his marriage fell apart, he felt as if he had no choice but to write about it, saying, "I owed myself to put the songs on the record and I owe myself to sing them." He described his method of composition as "writing things down as they were happening."

Ritter made a conscious decision not to listen to other breakup albums while writing Beast, telling Erin Lyndal Martin of PopMatters that it was too painful to listen to many of the songs he used to love.

Ritter wrote an open letter to his fans, detailing his personal life throughout the time period where Beast was written.

== Release and promotion ==
Ritter announced the album, as well as the details of a 2013 North American tour, on December 11, 2012. As part of the album announcement, Ritter released the first single from The Beast in Its Tracks, "Joy to You Baby".

The Beast in Its Tracks debuted at No. 22 on the Billboard 200 for the week of March 23, 2013. The following week, it dropped down to No. 66. The album also had strong showings on the Americana/Folk Albums Billboard chart, where it spent 11 weeks and peaked at No. 3 on March 23; and the Top Rock Albums chart, where it spent two weeks and peaked at No. 8. Internationally, The Beast in Its Tracks also appeared on the Belgian and Dutch charts, spending one week at No. 191 and No. 98, respectively.

== Reception ==
Professional ratings
Aggregate scores
Source	Rating
Metacritic	78/100
Review scores
Source	Rating
AllMusic	3.5/5 stars
American Songwriter	4/5 stars
The Boston Globe	(favorable)
Exclaim!	7/10
The Guardian	4/5 stars
The Independent	(favorable)
Pitchfork	68/100
PopMatters	8/10

The Beast in Its Tracks was released to a positive reception from music critics. Review aggregator Metacritic, which assigns a normalized rating out of 100 to reviews from mainstream publications, gave the album an average score of 78, indicating "generally favourable reviews".

Stephen Thompson of NPR said that the album "mostly hovers in a fascinating spot" somewhere between the pain of divorce and the joy of a new relationship.

== Track listing ==
All tracks are written by Josh Ritter.

No.	Title	Length
1.	"Third Arm"	0:47
2.	"Evil Eye"	2:37
3.	"A Certain Light"	2:48
4.	"Hopeful"	4:25
5.	"Nightmares"	3:39
6.	"New Lover"	4:25
7.	"Heart's Ease"	3:21
8.	"In Your Arms Again"	3:15
9.	"The Appleblossom Rag"	4:27
10.	"Bonfire"	2:51
11.	"In Your Arms Awhile"	2:03
12.	"Joy to You Baby"	4:40
13.	"Lights"	4:02
Total length:		43:22

== Personnel ==
Josh Ritter and the Royal City Band

- Josh Ritter – vocals, guitar, vacuum cleaner on "In Your Arms Again"
- Liam Hurley – drums, percussion, vocals on "Hopeful" and "In Your Arms Awhile"
- Sam Kassirer – keyboards, percussion
- Josh Kaufman – guitar, bass guitar, percussion on "Evil Eye", vocals on "Hopeful" and "In Your Arms Awhile"

Additional musicians

- Zack Hickman – guitar on "Heart's Ease"
- Austin Nevins – guitar on "Heart's Ease"

Production

- Sam Kassirer – producer, engineer, mixing
- Erik Hischmann – assistant engineer
- Jeff Lipton – mastering
- Maria Rice – assistant mastering engineer

== Charts ==
=== Weekly charts ===
Chart (2013)	Peak position
Belgian Albums (Ultratop Wallonia)	191
Dutch Albums (MegaCharts)	98
US Billboard 200	22
US Americana/Folk Albums (Billboard)	3
US Rock Albums (Billboard)	8

=== Year-end charts ===
Chart (2013)	Position
US Americana/Folk Albums (Billboard)	28
