= Girl in the War =

Girl in the War EP

EP by Josh Ritter
- Released: August 29, 2006 (Digital); November 27, 2006 (CD)
- Genre: Folk rock; Americana
- Length: 27:29
- Label: V2 Records
- Producer: Brian Deck

Josh Ritter chronology
In the Dark – Live at Vicar Street (2006)	Girl in the War EP (2006)	Good Man EP (2006)

Girl in the War EP is an EP by American singer-songwriter Josh Ritter. It was originally released on August 29, 2006, as a download-only EP. Then on November 27, 2006, it was released as a CD. It features one album track, the title track, along with several covers and demos.

== Critical reception ==
Professional ratings
Review scores
Source	Rating
The Skinny	4/5 stars
Uncut	4/5 stars

Jamie Curtis of Contact Music compared Ritter in Girl in the War to other great Americana songwriters such as Woody Guthrie, Bob Dylan, Johnny Cash, Neil Young.

== Track listing ==
All songs written by Josh Ritter, except "Blame it on the Tetons" written by Dan Gallucci, Eric Judy, Isaac Brock, and Tom Peloso of Modest Mouse.

1. "Girl in the War" (album version) – 4:24
2. "Blame it on the Tetons" (Modest Mouse cover) – 4:04
3. "Harbortown" (non-album track) – 3:11
4. "Peter Killed the Dragon" (non-album track) – 2:32
5. "Monster Ballads" (early version) – 4:37
6. "In the Dark" (acoustic demo) – 4:29
7. "Girl in the War" (acoustic demo) – 4:16
