= Sermon on the Rocks =

Studio album by Josh Ritter
- Released: October 16, 2015
- Recorded: January 5–17, 2015
- Studio: The Parlor, New Orleans
- Genre: Folk rock; Americana
- Length: 44:41
- Label: Pytheas Recordings
- Producer: Trina Shoemaker, Josh Ritter

Josh Ritter chronology
Josh Ritter – Acoustic Live Vol. 1: Somerville Theater/Somerville, Mass (2015)	Sermon on the Rocks (2015)	Gathering (2017)

Singles from Sermon on the Rocks
- 1. "Getting Ready To Get Down" Released: September 17, 2015; 2. "Homecoming" Released: December 9, 2015

Sermon on the Rocks is the eighth full-length studio album, by singer/songwriter Josh Ritter. It was released October 16, 2015 on Pytheas Recordings.

Ritter described the record as "messianic oracular honky-tonk."

== Background ==
American singer-songwriter Josh Ritter released his sixth full-length studio album, The Beast in Its Tracks, on March 5, 2013, via Pytheas Recordings. The album, inspired by Ritter's 2011 divorce from fellow musician Dawn Landes, intentionally ended on a hopeful note, as Ritter told Boston, "I do believe that in all my records, I've never ended it on a 'down' note. I just don't believe in it. I want to leave a little fire to carry on into the next record."

== Critical reception ==
Professional ratings
Aggregate scores
Source	Rating
Metacritic	79/100
Review scores
Source	Rating
AllMusic	3.5/5 stars
Irish Times	3/5 stars
Raidió Teilifís Éireann	3/5 stars
Rolling Stone	3.5/5 stars

NPR's Stephen Thomson said the album contains "some of Ritter's slipperiest, nimblest wordplay" and Jonathan Bernstein of Rolling Stone commented that the record used "Eighties textures" and "vivid character sketches" to yield a very different result from its predecessor, The Beast in Its Tracks.

== Track listing ==
All songs written by Josh Ritter.

1. "Birds of the Meadow" – 3:15
2. "Young Moses" – 4:08
3. "Henrietta, Indiana" – 3:43
4. "Getting Ready To Get Down" – 3:16
5. "Seeing Me Round" – 4:58
6. "Where the Night Goes" – 3:49
7. "Cumberland" – 2:17
8. "Homecoming" – 5:31
9. "The Stone" – 3:55
10. "A Big Enough Sky" – 2:47
11. "Lighthouse Fire" – 3:12
12. "My Man on a Horse (is Here)" – 3:50

== Personnel ==
=== Musicians ===
- Josh Ritter — acoustic and electric guitar, lead and harmony vocals
- Zachariah Hickman — upright and electric bass, acoustic and classical guitar, percussion, vocals
- Matt Barrick — drums, percussion, vocals
- Sam Kassirer — piano, electric piano, clavinet, synthesizer, Hammond and Farfisa organs, percussion, vocals
- Josh Kaufman — acoustic, electric, 12-string Rickenbacker and slide guitar, electric mandolin, bongos, vocals
- Trina Shoemaker — percussion

=== Production ===
- Recorded at The Parlor, New Orleans, January 5–17, 2015
- Produced by Trina Shoemaker and Josh Ritter
- Recorded by Trina Shoemaker with Eric Heigel
- Mixed by Trina Shoemaker
- Mastered by Jeff Lipton at Peerless Mastering
- Assistant Mastering Engineer: Maria Rice

== Charts ==
Chart performance for Sermon on the Rocks
Chart (2016)	Peak position
US Billboard 200	49
US Top Rock Albums (Billboard)	6
US Folk Albums (Billboard)	1
US Vinyl Albums (Billboard)	5
US Independent Albums (Billboard)	8
US Top Tastemaker Albums (Billboard)	4
