= Cassandra Jenkins =

American singer and musician

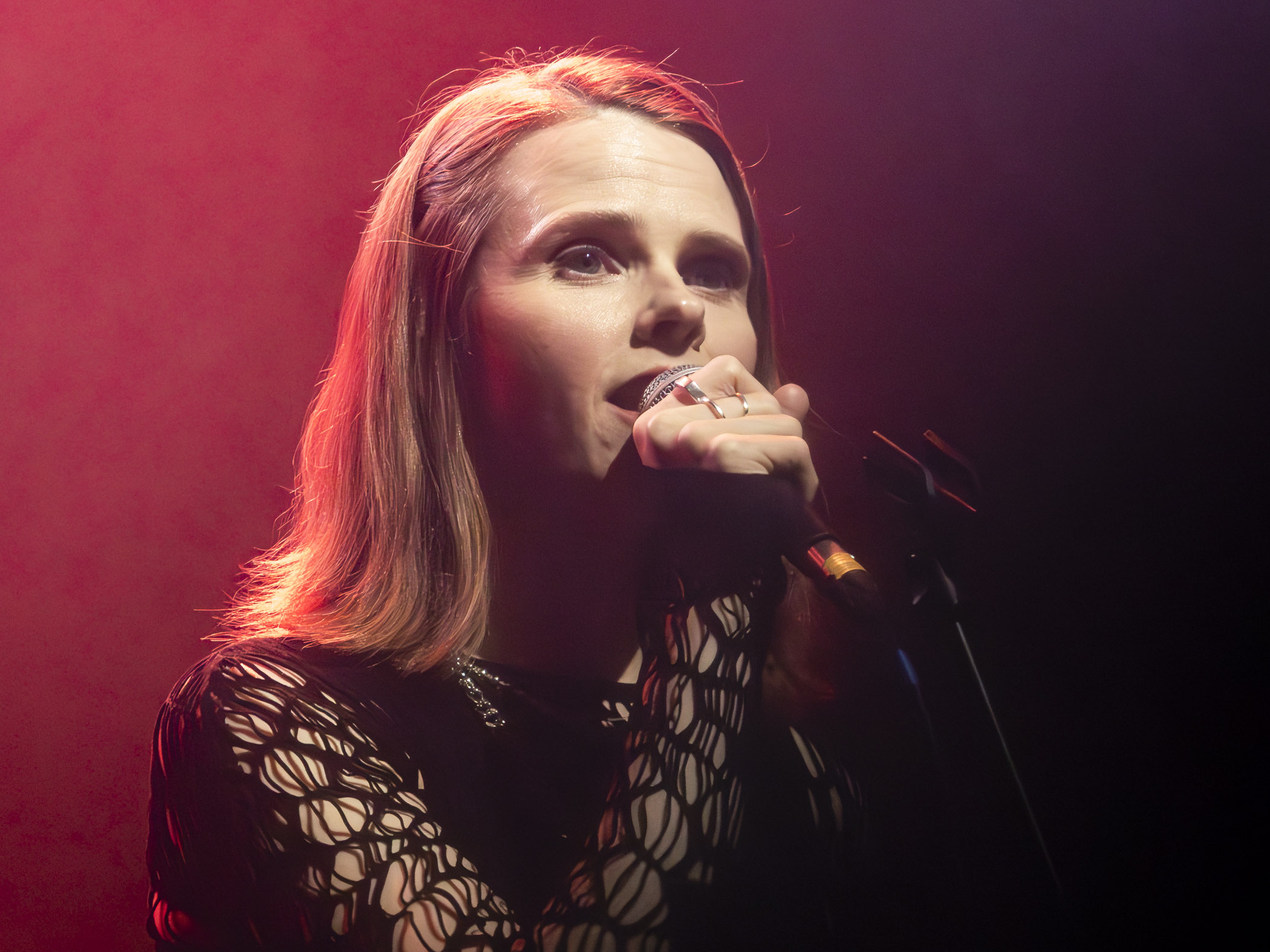
- Cassandra Jenkins performing in London in June 2025

Background information
- Born: 1984 (age 41–42); New York City, U.S.
- Genres: Ambient pop; folk-pop
- Occupations: Singer-songwriter; musician
- Instruments: Vocals; guitar
- Years active: 2013–present
- Labels: Ba Da Bing; Melodic; Dead Oceans
- Website: cassandrajenkins.com

Cassandra Jenkins (born 1984) is an American singer-songwriter from New York City.

== Early life and education ==
Cassandra Jenkins was born into a musical New York family. Her parents played on cruise ships in the 1980s. She learned how to play the guitar and sing at a young age. Before the age of 12, she toured with her family band playing folk music at festivals. She is the older sister of Reid Jenkins of the band Morningsiders.

Jenkins graduated from the Rhode Island School of Design in 2006, where she studied visual arts. For two years, she worked as an editorial assistant at The New Yorker.

== Career ==
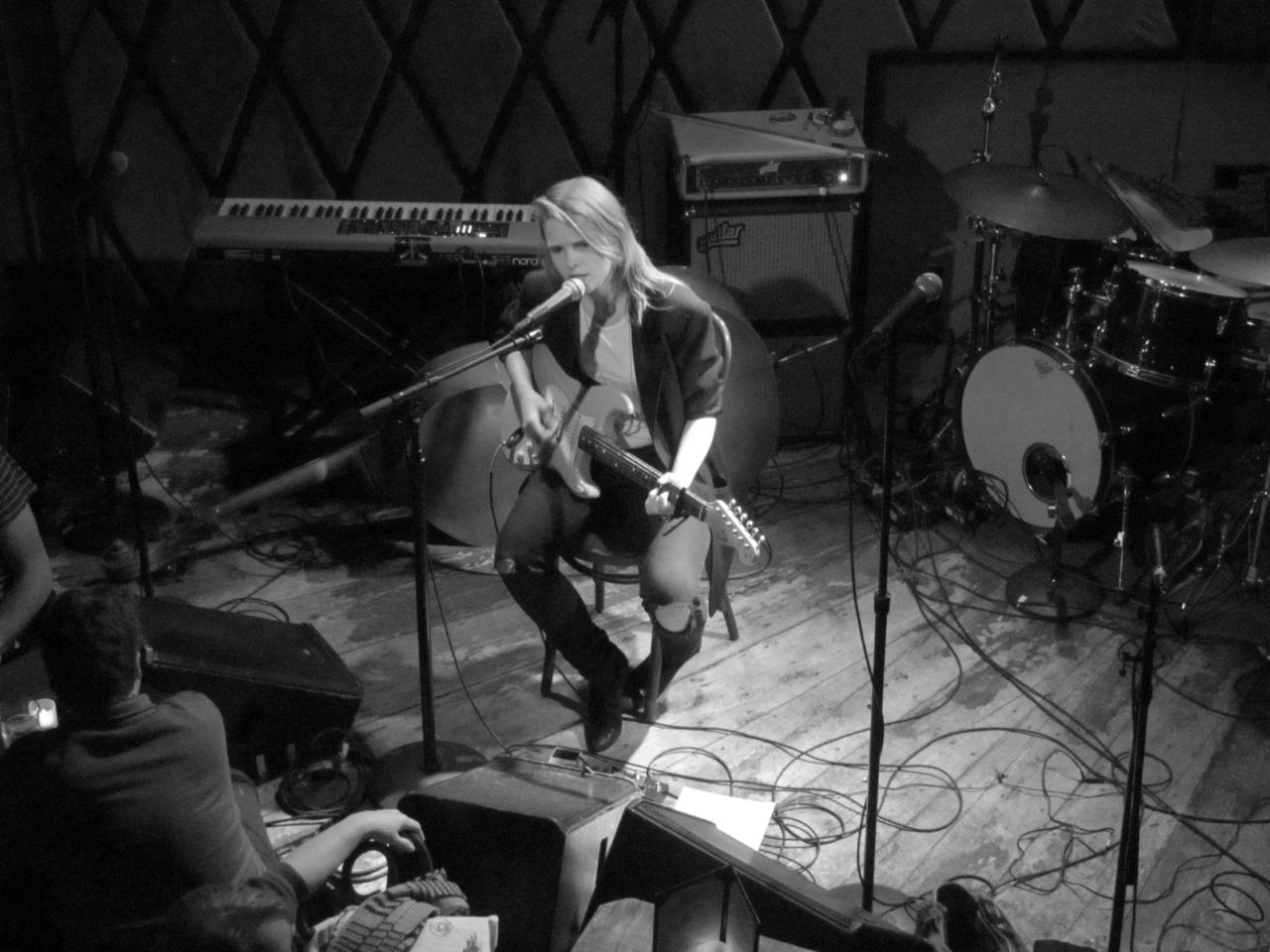
Cassandra Jenkins 2013 (2)

Jenkins released her self-titled debut EP in April 2013, with an album titled Play Till You Win following in 2017 and receiving positive reviews. Her second album, An Overview on Phenomenal Nature, was released to critical acclaim in February 2021, featuring production by multi-instrumentalist Josh Kaufman. Her 2024 album, My Light, My Destroyer, was given a rating of 8.0 by Pitchfork.

Jenkins performed as a back-up member for Eleanor Friedberger and Craig Finn, and was scheduled to tour with Purple Mountains before the death of David Berman in 2019.

In 2022, Jenkins accompanied Courtney Barnett on several of her tour dates across the U.S.

Also in 2022 Jenkins opened for Mitski on portions of her United Kingdom tour, including in Cardiff, and Andy Shauf at Webster Hall.

== Discography ==
=== Studio albums ===
- Play Till You Win (2017)
- An Overview on Phenomenal Nature (2021)
- My Light, My Destroyer (2024)
- My Light, My Massage Parlor (2025)

=== Extended plays ===
- EP (2013)

=== Compilations ===
- (An Overview on) An Overview on Phenomenal Nature (2021)

=== Live albums ===
- Cassandra Jenkins on Audiotree Live (2018)
- Live in Foxen Canyon (2018)

=== Singles ===
- "Rabbit" (2013)
- "Perfect Day" (2014)
- "EP" (2014) (Caterpillar, The Bird, Motorcycle Mary, Up In Flames, Telephone Ghost, Birthday Song)
- "Live in Foxen Canyon" EP (2018)
- "Hotel Lullaby" (Acoustic) (2019)
- "Things To You" (2020)
- "Michelangelo" (2021)
- "Hard Drive" (2021)
- "Crosshairs" (2021)
- "Hailey (Premix)" (2021)
- "American Spirits" (2021)
- "Pygmalion" (2022)
- "Only One" (2024)
- "Delphinium Blue" (2024)
- "Petco" (2024)
- "Clams Casino" (2024)
