= Bright's Passage =

Book by Josh Ritter

- First edition cover
- Author: Josh Ritter
- Language: English
- Publisher: Dial Press
- Publication date: June 28th 2011
- Publication place: United States
- Media type: Print
- Pages: 208
- ISBN: 978-1-4000-6950-7

Bright's Passage is the debut novel by singer/songwriter Josh Ritter. It is published by Dial Press and was released June 28, 2011. The first chapter had been previously released for free download on Ritter's official website.

== Blurb ==
The novel follows a young, widowed veteran of the First World War, Henry Bright, as he and his infant son, along with an unlikely guardian angel flee from a forest fire and Bright's cruel in-laws. Shifting between their strange journey through West Virginia's hickory-canopied foothills, Bright's plausible memories of the trenches of France, and recollections from his childhood, the novel is at times suspenseful and kinetic, quiet and eerie, and at times humorous.
