= Spectral Lines =

Studio album by Josh Ritter
- Released: April 28, 2023
- Studio: Great North Sound Society (Parsonsfield, ME); Dimension Sound Studios; The Bungfalfau; Studio G
- Genre: Americana; folk
- Length: 37:19
- Label: Pytheas
- Producer: Sam Kassierer

Josh Ritter chronology
Fever Breaks (2019)	Spectral Lines (2023)	Heaven, or Someplace as Nice (2024)

Spectral Lines is the eleventh studio album by American singer-songwriter Josh Ritter. It was released on April 28, 2023, through Pytheas Recordings. The main recording sessions took place at the Great North Sound Society in Parsonsfield with additional recording at Dimension Sound Studios, The Bungfalfau, and Studio G. Production was handled by Sam Kassirer.

== Composition ==
Ritter announced the album on January 24, 2023. "I wanted to make a record that looked outward, following close on the heels of time as it traveled forward, looking toward the future, rather than backward at the record of things past. The songs on Spectral Lines float forward through all kinds of sonic environments, from the winds of Mars, through realms caustic and sumptuous. Sam Kassirer and a host of angelic musicians helped me as I traveled. The signal that the lyrics beam out is composed of Light, in the spectrums of Imminence and Resolve and Love".

Ritter also returned to recording with his Royal City Band after recording his last album with Jason Isbell and his band The 400 Unit where Isbell also served as producer.

== Critical reception ==
Professional ratings
Aggregate scores
Source	Rating
Metacritic	75/100
Review scores
Source	Rating
American Songwriter	3.5/5 stars
PopMatters	8/10
Spectrum Culture	3.55/5 stars
Sputnikmusic	4.5/5
The Irish Times	3/5 stars

Spectral Lines was met with universal acclaim from music critics. At Metacritic, which assigns a normalized rating out of 100 to reviews from mainstream publications, the album received an average score of 75 based on five reviews.

Sputnikmusic staff writer praised the album, calling it "a batch of quietly luminous tracks that feel just as interlocked as the secrets of the universe, sharing pianos that blossom to stunning effect, vocal harmonization that whisks your mind off toward the ether, guitars with just enough bite to lend traction, and seamless transitions that give the entire experience an effortless, elegant flow". Steve Horowitz of PopMatters stated: "the poetic lyrics combine with the sensitive instrumentation to create a sum greater than the individual parts. The words have a more profound sensibility than their dreaminess initially coveys. The musical sounds become more complex when taken in sequence and as a whole". Lee Zimmerman of American Songwriter declared: "the end result is an album that demands a concerted listen in order to fully appreciate all the tones and textures it has to offer. With Spectral Lines, Josh Ritter continues to blur the boundary between melody and mystique".

Paste magazine listed the album as one of the 10 best albums of April 2023, writing: "Josh Ritter is like a more open-hearted version of Leonard Cohen. His lyrics draw on the divine but he seems to see a little heaven in all the people around him. The Idaho native's 11th album Spectral Lines is his most contemplative and ethereal, examining human connection with all its beauty and pain".

== Track listing ==
All tracks are written by Joshua B. Ritter.

No.	Title	Length
1.	"Sawgrass"	4:32
2.	"Honey I Do"	3:03
3.	"Horse No Rider"	5:26
4.	"For Your Soul"	3:05
5.	"Black Crown"	3:40
6.	"Strong Swimmer"	3:14
7.	"Whatever Burns Will Burn"	4:11
8.	"Any Way They Come"	2:18
9.	"In Fields"	2:55
10.	"Someday"	4:55
Total length:		37:19

== Personnel ==
- Josh Ritter – lyrics, vocals, acoustic guitar (tracks: 2, 9), electric guitar (track 9)
- Jocie Adams – vocals (tracks: 1, 3, 5, 6, 10), clarinet (tracks: 3, 5), synthesizer (track 3), remote recording
- Joelle Lurie – vocals (track 7)
- Sam Kassirer – piano (tracks: 1–3, 5–7, 9, 10), mellotron (tracks: 1, 3, 5–7, 9, 10), organ (tracks: 2, 4, 9), synthesizer (tracks: 3, 4, 6, 7, 10), clavinet (track 4), Farfisa organ (tracks: 5, 6), Hammond organ (track 8), melodica (track 9), Fender Rhodes electric piano & drums (track 10), producer, recording, photography
- Kevin O'Connell – drums (tracks: 1, 2, 5, 6, 9), electric bass (tracks: 2, 5, 6, 10), electric guitar (tracks: 2, 5, 9), percussion (track 6)
- Matt Douglas – woodwind (track 1), saxophone (track 10), remote recording
- Shane Leonard – drums & percussion (tracks: 3, 4), electric guitar & bass (track 3), acoustic guitar & electric bass (track 4)
- Rich Hinman – pedal steel guitar (tracks: 5, 7, 10), electric guitar (tracks: 5, 10), remote recording
- Zachariah Hickman – double bass (track 7), electric bass (track 9)
- Dietrich Strause – acoustic guitar & electric guitar (track 10)
- D. James Goodwin – mixing, mastering
- Matthew Fleming – design, layout
- Rachel Hanley – cover photo

== Charts ==
Chart (2023)	Peak position
UK Album Downloads (OCC)	97
UK Americana Albums (OCC)	7
UK Independent Albums (OCC)	37
US Top Album Sales (Billboard)	37
US Top Current Album Sales (Billboard)	25
