= An Overview on Phenomenal Nature =

Studio album by Cassandra Jenkins
- Released: February 19, 2021
- Length: 31:44
- Label: Ba Da Bing

Cassandra Jenkins chronology
Play Till You Win (2017)	An Overview on Phenomenal Nature (2021)	My Light, My Destroyer (2024)

Professional ratings
Aggregate scores
Source	Rating
Metacritic	87/100
Review scores
Source	Rating
AllMusic	4.5/5 stars
Beats Per Minute	79%
Exclaim!	8/10
Pitchfork	8.3/10

An Overview on Phenomenal Nature is the second studio album by American musician Cassandra Jenkins. It was released on February 19, 2021, through Ba Da Bing Records.

== Release ==
On January 5, 2021, Cassandra Jenkins announced the release of her second studio album. On November 19, 2021, a series of demos and other recordings from the recording sessions entitled (An Overview on) An Overview on Phenomenal Nature was released.

=== Singles ===
The first single "Michelangelo" was released on January 5, 2021, alongside the announcement of the album.

The second single "Hard Drive" was released on January 20, 2021.

=== Music videos ===
On January 5, 2021, Jenkins released the first official music video for "Michelangelo" on YouTube.

The official music video for "Hard Drive" was released on Jenkins' official YouTube on January 21, 2021. It was edited and directed by Josh Goleman.

Cassandra Jenkins released the third music video "Crosshairs" on February 10, 2021. In a press release of the video, Jenkins explained "I wrote "Crosshairs" in the before times — not thinking about isolation. Listening to the song now, it reads more literally; I’ve never craved human interaction in the way I have over the course of the past year, and my experience of time has completely shifted. I decided to shoot this video over the weekend because I want to capture the snowy cityscape of New York in February 2021 and how my inner landscape feels in this moment — simultaneously miniscule [sic] and expansive."

== Critical reception ==
An Overview on Phenomenal Nature was met with "universal acclaim" reviews from critics. At Metacritic, which assigns a weighted average rating out of 100 to reviews from mainstream publications, this release received an average score of 87 based on 9 reviews. Aggregator website Album of the Year gave the release a 82 out of 100 based on a critical consensus of 10 reviews.

In a review for AllMusic, Timothy Monger gave high praise to the release, explaining "Five years after her debut album, Cassandra Jenkins returns with Overview on Phenomenal Nature, a stunning work of impressionistic connections, contradictions, and observations all stitched together into a web of graceful dream folk. Themes of loss and healing reverberate throughout the album, especially on the hushed "Ambiguous Norway" and the gorgeous standout "New Bikini," a pair of tracks in which David Berman plays a significant role."

=== Accolades ===
An Overview on Phenomenal Nature on year-end lists
Publication	List	Rank	Ref.
The Guardian	The 50 Best Albums of 2021	32	
Paste	The 50 Best Albums of 2021	17	
Pitchfork	The 50 Best Albums of 2021	17	

== Track listing ==
An Overview on Phenomenal Nature track listing
No.	Title	Length
1.	"Michelangelo"	3:30
2.	"New Bikini"	4:22
3.	"Hard Drive"	5:27
4.	"Crosshairs"	4:04
5.	"Ambiguous Norway"	4:20
6.	"Hailey"	2:53
7.	"The Ramble"	7:08
Total length:		31:44
