= Hello Starling =

Studio album by Josh Ritter
- Released: September 9, 2003; January 17, 2010 (Deluxe Edition)
- Recorded: February 17, 2003 – March 3, 2003, at Black Box Studios, La Dionnaie, France
- Genre: Folk rock; Americana
- Length: 43:09
- Label: Signature Sounds (2003); Stetanta (2003); Independent/RMG (2003); V2 (2005)
- Producer: David Odlum

Josh Ritter chronology
Come & Find Me EP (2002)	Hello Starling (2003)	4 Songs Live EP (2005)

Singles from Hello Starling
- 1. "Hello Starling (Snow Is Gone)" Released: May 31, 2004

Hello Starling is the third studio album by American singer-songwriter Josh Ritter. It was Ritter's second album release nationally on the label Signature Sounds. It was originally released on September 9, 2003, a two-disc deluxe edition was re-issued on January 17, 2010

== Critical reception ==
Professional ratings
Review scores
Source	Rating
Allmusic	4.5/5 stars
The Guardian	4/5 stars
Now	4/5 stars
Pitchfork	8.3/10
Uncut	3/5 stars

As Ritter's previous albums have done, Hello Starling was compared to other Americana greats such as Woody Guthrie, Townes Van Zandt, Bob Dylan, and Leonard Cohen. His voice on the album was described as smooth with sleepy, rough edges. George Graham praised the lyrics and vocal delivery.

== Track listing ==
All songs written by Josh Ritter.

1. "Bright Smile" – 3:01
2. "Kathleen" – 4:08
3. "You Don't Make It Easy Babe" – 2:32
4. "Man Burning" – 2:47
5. "Rainslicker" – 4:13
6. "Wings" – 4:07
7. "California" – 3:10
8. "Snow Is Gone" – 4:03
9. "Bone of Song" – 5:30
10. "Baby That's Not All" – 5:59
11. "The Bad Actress" – 3:39

== Credits ==
=== Personnel ===
- Josh Ritter – voice, guitar, violin
- Zack Hickman – bass, guitar, mandolin
- David Hingerty – drums
- Sam Kassirer – Hammond organ, Wurlitzer, piano, accordion
- David Odlum – guitar, mandolin, vocals
- Darius Zelkha – drums on "California", vocals

=== Production ===
- Mixed by David Odlum
- Mastering by Jonathan Wyner
- Artwork by Ed Braverman

== Deluxe Edition ==
Hello Starling was reissued on January 17, 2010, as a two-disc Deluxe Edition. The Deluxe Edition includes the complete original studio album and a second bonus disc. The bonus disc contains solo acoustic versions of all the original tracks (re-recorded by Ritter in Nashville of June 2008) as well as four live bonus tracks, an introduction by Dennis Lehane, and a full color lyric and photo booklet with never-before-seen photos.

=== Track listing of Deluxe Edition (Bonus CD) ===
1. "Bright Smile (Solo Acoustic)" – 3:14
2. "Kathleen (Solo Acoustic)" – 4:10
3. "You Don't Make It Easy Babe (Solo Acoustic)" – 2:51
4. "Man Burning (Solo Acoustic)" – 2:50
5. "Rainslicker (Solo Acoustic)" – 4:09
6. "Wings (Solo Acoustic)" – 4:33
7. "California (Solo Acoustic)" – 3:20
8. "Snow Is Gone (Solo Acoustic)" – 3:40
9. "Bone of Song (Solo Acoustic)" – 5:14
10. "Baby That's Not All (Solo Acoustic)" – 3:21
11. "The Bad Actress (Solo Acoustic)" – 3:19
12. "Kathleen (Live)" – 4:35
13. "Golden Age of Radio (Live)" – 4:40
14. "You Don't Make It Easy Babe (Live)" – 3:38
15. "Snow is Gone (Live)" – 4:17
