= In the Dark – Live at Vicar Street =

In The Dark – Live at Vicar Street

Live album by Josh Ritter
- Released: April 16, 2007
- Recorded: Vicar Street Theatre, Dublin, Ireland
- Genre: Folk rock; Americana
- Length: 1:10:48
- Label: Independent Records
- Producer: Neil Kopp

Josh Ritter chronology
The Animal Years (2006)	In The Dark – Live at Vicar Street (2007)	Girl in the War (2006)

Professional ratings
Review scores
Source	Rating
AllMusic	3.5/5 stars

In The Dark – Live at Vicar Street is a live album/Concert film by American singer-songwriter Josh Ritter. It was released on April 16, 2007. The album is a two disc CD/DVD set. It was recorded on back-to-back nights at the Vicar Street Theatre in Dublin, Ireland.

== Track listing ==
All songs written by Josh Ritter.

=== Disc one (CD) ===
1. "Idaho" – 5:03
2. "Good Man" – 4:18
3. "Me & Jiggs" – 3:48
4. "Harrisburg" – 5:09
5. "Wings" – 6:07
6. "One More Mouth" – 3:54
7. "Lillian, Egypt" – 4:31
8. "Kathleen Intro" – 1:57
9. "Kathleen" – 4:59
10. "Best for the Best" – 4:51
11. "Girl in the War" – 4:32
12. "Thin Blue Flame" – 10:13
13. "Snow Is Gone" – 4:56
14. "Leaving" – 6:30

=== Disc two (DVD) ===
1. "Intro"
2. "Kathleen"
3. "Wolves"
4. "(Interview)"
5. "Girl in the War"
6. "Best for the Best"
7. "Monster Ballads"
8. "Gear Setup"
9. "Here at the Right Time"
10. "(Interview)"
11. "Harrisburg"
12. "(Interview)"
13. "One More Mouth"
14. "(Interview)"
15. "Idaho"
16. "In the Dark"
17. "(Interview)"
18. "Harbor Lights"
19. "Lillian, Egypt"
20. "Thin Blue Flames"
21. "Snow Is Gone"
22. "Parting Glass"
23. "(Interview)"
24. "Bone of Song"

== Credits ==
=== Personnel ===
- Josh Ritter — vocals and guitars
- Zack Hickman – double bass, electric bass, acoustic guitar, electric guitar, background vocals
- Sam Kassirer — electric piano, piano, organs, guitar, percussion

=== Production ===
- Mixed by Dennis E. Powell
- Mastering by Chris Parmenidis
- Editing by Corrine Theodoru
- Directed by Dennis W. Fitzgerald
