= Fever Breaks =

Studio album by Josh Ritter
- Released: April 26, 2019
- Recorded: 2018
- Studios: RCA Studio A (Nashville, Tennessee): Sound Emporium (Nashville, Tennessee)
- Genre: Folk rock
- Length: 45:22
- Label: Pytheas
- Producer: Jason Isbell

Josh Ritter chronology
| Gathering (2017) | Fever Breaks (2019) | Spectral Lines (2023) |

Fever Breaks is the tenth studio album by American singer-songwriter Josh Ritter. The album was released on April 26, 2019, by Pytheas Recordings.

== Composition ==
Ritter tapped American singer-songwriter Jason Isbell to produce Fever Breaks, as well as Isbell's band The 400 Unit on instrumental support. Isbell's wife and collaborator Amanda Shires also provided input on the album process. Ritter, who previously avoided writing songs about the political climate, said, "I thought I could turn my face away and write love songs, but all I could see was the world in flames."

== Release ==
On January 29, 2019, Ritter announced that his tenth album, Fever Breaks would be released on April 26 via Pytheas. Accompanying the album announcement was the first single release, "Old Black Magic".

== Critical reception ==
Fever Breaks
Aggregate scores
| Source | Rating |
|---|---|
| Metacritic | 75/100 |
Review scores
| Source | Rating |
| Rolling Stone | 3.5/5 stars |
| NPR | (favorable) |
| The Irish Times | 3/5 stars |
| Associated Press | (favorable) |
| AllMusic | 3.5/5 stars |
| The Line of Best Fit | 8/10 |
| Exclaim! | 7/10 |
| The Spill Magazine | 4/5 stars |

Fever Breaks was released to a generally positive critical reception. Review aggregator website Metacritic assigned the album an average score of 75, indicating "generally favorable reviews".

Rolling Stone, which rated the album three and a half stars out of five, said that, while the album "blazes no new emotional or musical ground," it "feels like a vital career summation, a survey course sampler in a word-swilling artist's narrative gifts and endearing empathy." NPR, similarly, praised the way in which Ritter "tweaks and further reinvigorates a sound and songwriting approach that's lost none of its vitality or urgency in 20 years." Comparisons were drawn to Bob Dylan and Leonard Cohen on tracks "The Torch Committee", "Old Black Magic", and "Ground Don't Want Me", while "Losing Battles" bore comparisons to Crazy Horse.

Many reviews praised Isbell's production. The Line of Best Fit said that Isbell and his band give "Ritter's material a whole lot of muscle and bite in places," while The Irish Times, giving the album three stars out of five, noted that Isbell contributed to "a tougher framework around this latest batch of Ritter's songs." James Christopher Monger of Allmusic said that the 400 Unit provided "soaring harmonies and some truly emotive violin work," which added "considerable sonic heft to the proceedings."

== Track listing ==
All tracks are written by Josh Ritter.

Feveer Breaks track listing
| No. | Title | Length |
|---|---|---|
| 1. | "Ground Don't Want Me" | 4:18 |
| 2. | "Old Black Magic" | 4:46 |
| 3. | "On the Water" | 3:31 |
| 4. | "I Still Love You (Now and Then)" | 4:53 |
| 5. | "The Torch Committee" | 5:43 |
| 6. | "Silverblade" | 4:04 |
| 7. | "All Some Kind of Dream" | 4:18 |
| 8. | "Losing Battles" | 4:22 |
| 9. | "A New Man" | 4:29 |
| 10. | "Blazing Highway Home" | 4:58 |
| Total length: | | 45:22 |

== Personnel ==
Credits adapted from the album's liner notes.

- Josh Ritter – guitars, vocals
- Jason Isbell – guitars, vocals, production
- Derry deBorja – piano, organ, Hohner accordion
- Chad Gamble – drums, percussion
- Jimbo Hart – Fender Electric, ukulele, upright basses
- Sadler Vaden – electric guitars, acoustic guitars, 12-string acoustic guitar
- Amanda Shires – violin, vocals
- Matt Ross-Spang – recording, mixing
- Anna Marsh – recording assistance, mixing assistance
- Rachel Moore – additional recording assistance, additional mixing assistance
- Pete Lyman – mastering
- Jason Holley – cover painting
- David McClister – photography
- Michael Byzewski – layout, design

== Charts ==
| Chart (2019) | Peak position |
|---|---|
| Scottish Albums (Official Charts) | 48 |
| UK Americana Albums (Official Charts) | 8 |
| UK Independent Albums (Official Charts) | 25 |
| US Billboard 200 | 89 |
| US Top Rock Albums (Billboard) | 12 |
| US Americana/Folk Albums (Billboard) | 4 |
