= Gathering (album) =

Studio album by Josh Ritter
- Released: September 22, 2017
- Recorded: Clubhouse Studio, Rhinebeck, NY; Compass Studio, Nashville, TN; The Shed, Raleigh, NC; TRI Studios, San Rafael, CA
- Genre: Folk rock; Americana
- Length: 50:39
- Label: Pytheas Recordings
- Producer: Royal City Band

Josh Ritter chronology
Sermon on the Rocks (2015)	Gathering (2017)	Fever Breaks (2019)

Singles from Gathering
- 1. "Showboat" Released: July 19, 2017; 2. "Thunderbolt's Goodnight" Released: August 17, 2017; 3. "When Will I Be Changed" Released: September 7, 2017

Gathering is the ninth full-length studio album by American singer-songwriter Josh Ritter. It was released September 22, 2017 on Pytheas Recordings.

== Critical reception ==
Professional ratings
Aggregate scores
Source	Rating
Metacritic	88/100
Review scores
Source	Rating
AllMusic	4/5 stars
Glide Magazine	9/10 stars
PopMatters	9/10 stars
Slant	4.5/5 stars

Rolling Stone described Gathering as a combination of country, gospel, and soul.

Brian D’Ambrosio of Huffington Post said Ritter was uncertain, brisk, and contemplative while remaining intimate to the listener.

== Track listing ==
All songs written by Josh Ritter.

1. "Shaker Love Song (Leah)" – 1:03
2. "Showboat" – 4:22
3. "Friendamine" – 2:53
4. "Feels Like Lightning" – 3:02
5. "When Will I Be Changed" (featuring Bob Weir) – 5:52
6. "Train Go By" – 4:26
7. "Dreams" – 6:19
8. "Myrna Loy" – 7:30
9. "Interlude" – 1:24
10. "Cry Softly" – 2:45
11. "Oh Lord, Pt. 3" – 3:30
12. "Thunderbolt's Goodnight" – 4:05
13. "Strangers" – 3:28

== Personnel ==
=== Musicians ===
- Josh Ritter – acoustic and electric guitar, lead and harmony vocals
- Zackariah Hickman – bass, acoustic guitar, Wurlitzer
- Sam Kassirer – piano, organ, synthesizers, percussion
- Josh Kaufman – guitar, synthesizer
- Ray Rizzo – drums, percussion
- Matt Douglas – saxophones, clarinets, flutes and horn arrangements
- Paul Rogers – trumpet

=== Production ===
- Recorded at Clubhouse Studio, Rhineback, NY; Compass Studio, Nashville, TN; The Shed, Raleigh, NC; and TRI Studios
- Mixed by Chris Shaw and Trina Shoemaker
- Mastering by Jeff Lipton
- Cover Art by Josh Ritter
