= Josh Ritter (album) =

Studio album by Josh Ritter
- Released: April 1, 2000
- Recorded: TIMARA Studios, Oberlin, Ohio
- Genre: Folk rock; Americana
- Length: 45:55
- Label: Self-released
- Producer: Darius Zelkha

Josh Ritter chronology
Josh Ritter (2000)	Golden Age of Radio (2002)

Josh Ritter is the debut album by American singer-songwriter Josh Ritter. It was self-released in 1999.

Humorous folk-inspired songs such as "Hotel Song" and "Stuck to You" evoke comparisons to John Prine, while ballads "Letter from Omaha" and "Leaves and Kings" seem inspired by Leonard Cohen and Bob Dylan, whom Ritter frequently cites as influences.

Three versions of this album have been pressed; a digipak in 1999, followed by a jewel case package in 1999, then a digipak again in 2008. Superficially the 1999 and 2008 digipaks are similar, but the interior artwork and disc art differ among all three versions.

== Track listing ==
All songs written by Josh Ritter.

1. "Leaves and Kings" – 3:26
2. "Beautiful Night" – 2:42
3. "Hotel Song" – 2:08
4. "Paint Your Picture" – 3:41
5. "Angels on Her Shoulders" – 3:21
6. "Morning Is a Long Way Down" – 3:30
7. "Potter's Wheel" – 3:20
8. "Letter From Omaha" – 3:09
9. "Last Ditch Effort (See You Try)" – 3:11
10. "Paths Will Cross" – 3:02
11. "Pretty Polly" – 3:52
12. "Horrible Qualities" – 11:25 (contains bonus track "Stuck to You")

== Personnel ==
- Josh Ritter – voice, guitar, piano
- Zack Hickman – bass, organ, harp
- Tom Graves – cello
- Darius Zelkha – drums, "spooky sounds"
