= Live at the 9:30 Club (EP) =

Live album EP by Josh Ritter
- Released: April 19, 2008
- Recorded: 9:30 Club, Washington DC
- Genre: Folk rock; Americana
- Length: 30:53
- Label: Sony BMG

Josh Ritter chronology
The Historical Conquests of Josh Ritter (2007)	Live at the 9:30 Club (2008)	So Runs the World Away (2010)

Live at The 9:30 Club is an EP album by American singer-songwriter Josh Ritter. It was originally released on a national Record Store Day on April 19, 2008.

== Background ==
It was recorded by National Public Radio. Ritter describes it as a "live mini-album". The EP is eight songs Josh Ritter performed at a sold-out show in Washington DC on October 9, 2007, at the 9:30 Club.

== Track listing ==
All songs written by Josh Ritter.

1. Mind's Eye – 2:51
2. To the Dogs or Whoever – 3:18
3. Rumors – 3:54
4. The Temptation of Adam – 4:43
5. Right Moves – 4:03
6. Real Long Distance – 2:53
7. Lawrence, KS – 4:57
8. Next to the Last True Romantic (featuring Old School Freight Train) – 4:14

== Personnel ==
=== Musicians ===
- Josh Ritter – vocals and guitar
- Austin Nevins – guitar
- Zack Hickman – bass
- Liam Hurley – drums and percussion
- Sam Kassirer – piano

=== Additional musicians ===
- Matt Douglas — baritone saxophone
- Josh Carr — tenor saxophone
- Matt Rippetoe — alto saxophone
- Joe Herrera – trumpet

=== Production ===
- Mixed by Mark Greenhouse
- Engineered by Mark Greenhouse
- Mastered by Jeff Lipton
- Cover Art by Mike Ritter

== Irish special edition ==
A limited special edition was released in Ireland on September 5, 2008. It has two bonus songs, (Wildfires and California) and three bonus videos (Lillian Egypt, Overnight and Real Long Distance) on it.

All bonus material are live recordings from a show in Waterford, Ireland in December 2007.
