= The Historical Conquests of Josh Ritter =

Studio album by Josh Ritter
- Released: August 21, 2007
- Recorded: The Great North Sound Society, Maine
- Genres: Folk rock; Americana
- Length: 42:52
- Labels: Sony BMG; Independent; V2
- Producers: Sam Kassirer & mixed by Jacquire King

Josh Ritter chronology
Live at The Record Exchange EP (2007)	The Historical Conquests of Josh Ritter (2007)	Live at the 9:30 Club (2008)

Singles from The Historical Conquests of Josh Ritter
- 1. "Mind's Eye" Released: October 15, 2007; 2. "Right Moves" Released: December 17, 2007; 3. "Empty Hearts" Released: March 31, 2008; 4. "Real Long Distance" Released: May 5, 2008

The Historical Conquests of Josh Ritter is the fifth full-length album by American singer-songwriter Josh Ritter. It was released in the U.S. on August 21, 2007, in Ireland on September 7, 2007, through Independent Records, and released in the rest of Europe on October 1, 2007, by V2 Records. By July 26, 2007, the album had leaked onto peer-to-peer file-sharing websites.

The record was recorded in a Maine farmhouse dating to the 18th century. According to Ritter: "Lyrically, musically, and in terms of production, it's the most adventurous record I've made yet and I think when you hear it you're going to be surprised. Seriously, repeatedly, and in a good way."

== Thematic elements ==
The lyrics of the album's Dylanesque opening track, "To the Dogs or Whoever," contains a number of historical references, many of them to traditional American cultural and mythological figures:

- Florence Nightingale
- Calamity Jane
- Joan of Arc
- Casey Jones
- Casey at the Bat
- General George Armstrong Custer

The second verse of the song "Empty Hearts":

I'm inside with my friends

We build fires and pretend

That the night could just bend on forever

While outside in the frost

Are the wolves and the lost

And we sing to the dogs or whoever

These lyrics reference the title of the first track on the album, which could be read as the friends' singing that first song or singing for a canine audience. The title of the first track on the CD is never mentioned in that song's lyrics, but Ritter self-referentially uses it in the lyrics of "Empty Hearts," suggesting that the songs on the CD may have an interrelated design.

== Critical reception ==
Professional ratings
Aggregate scores
Source	Rating
Metacritic	79/100
Review scores
Source	Rating
AllMusic	4/5 stars
Entertainment Weekly	(A−)
Pitchfork	5.7/10 stars
Tiny Mix Tapes	4/5 marks
Slant	4/5 stars

In regards to The Historical Conquests of Josh Ritter, Paste Magazine described Ritter as the poster-boy of Americana music. As with previous albums, Ritter was compared to the great American songwriters like Bob Dylan and Bruce Springsteen.

== Track listing ==
All songs written by Josh Ritter. The strings were written and arranged by Sam Kassirer, and the horns by Sam Kassirer and Zack Hickman.

1. "To the Dogs or Whoever" – 3:02
2. "Mind's Eye" – 2:53
3. "Right Moves" – 3:44
4. "The Temptation of Adam" – 4:12
5. "Open Doors" – 2:35
6. "Rumors" – 3:31
7. "Edge of the World" – 1:41
8. "Wait for Love" – 3:46
9. "Real Long Distance" – 2:42
10. "Next to the Last Romantic" – 2:49
11. "Moons" – 0:51
12. "Still Beating" – 3:49
13. "Empty Hearts" – 4:40
14. "Wait for Love (You Know You Will)" – 2:37

== Credits ==
=== Personnel ===
- Josh Ritter — vocals and guitars
- Zack Hickman – double bass, electric bass, acoustic guitar and electric guitar, baritone guitar, trombone, lap steel guitar, background vocals
- Liam Hurley – drums, percussion
- Sam Kassirer — electric piano, piano, organs, guitar, vibraphone, percussion
- Matt Douglas — Clarinet, Sax, Vocals

=== Production ===
- Mixed by Jacquire King
- Mastering by Jeff Lipton and Jessica Thompson

== Bonus EP ==
Initial copies of the album included a limited-edition bonus EP CD containing "four little tracks – interesting 'bits and pieces' – from the recording sessions."

=== Track listing ===
1. "Wildfires" – 4:48
2. "Spot in my Heart" – 0:37
3. "Naked as a Window" – 1:29
4. "Labelship Down" – 0:54
