= So Runs the World Away =

Studio album by Josh Ritter
- Released: April 17, 2010 (Record Store Day); May 4, 2010
- Recorded: The Great North Sound Society, Maine; Saltlands Studios, Brooklyn, New York
- Genres: Folk rock; Americana
- Length: 53:39
- Label: Pytheas Recordings
- Producer: Sam Kassirer

Josh Ritter chronology
Live at the 9:30 Club (2008)	So Runs the World Away (2010)	To the Yet Unknowing World (2011)

Singles from The Historical Conquests of Josh Ritter
- 1. "Change of Time" Released: February 8, 2010

So Runs the World Away is the sixth studio album by American singer-songwriter Josh Ritter. It was released on vinyl record on April 17, 2010, as a part of Record Store Day in the United States. The vinyl record came packaged with a CD version of the album as well. The official album release was April 23, 2010, in Ireland, and May 4, 2010, worldwide. Ritter said of the album that it "marks the beginning of a new period in [his] life," and that overall, "the songs are larger and more detailed, and feel to me as if they were painted in oil on large canvasses." Ritter got the title from a line in the third act of Shakespeare's Hamlet.

== Release and reception ==
Professional ratings
Aggregate scores
Source	Rating
Metacritic	81/100
Review scores
Source	Rating
AllMusic	4/5 stars
Drowned in Sound	8/10
The Guardian	4/5 stars
Mojo	4/5 stars
Paste	8.3/10
PopMatters	8/10
Q	4/5 stars
Spin	4/5 stars
Sputnikmusic	3.5/5
Uncut	4/5 stars

The record's release was met with high anticipation and covered by multiple news and media publications. Stephen King reported looking forward to the album. Irish music magazine Hot Press featured "Josh Ritter week" with free track downloads from the album, front cover picture, and interviews. Upon its release the album was met with very strong reviews. The Irish Independent called it "Ritter's most intriguing and rewarding album to date, it's easily his most diverse." Bob Boilen of NPR's All Songs Considered said of the album, "I've come to expect good records from him...but this one took my breath away."

== Track listing ==
All songs written by Josh Ritter, except "Folk Bloodbath" written by Ritter based on a traditional song by Mississippi John Hurt.

1. "Curtains" – 0:57
2. "Change of Time" – 4:04
3. "The Curse" – 5:03
4. "Southern Pacifica" – 4:24
5. "Rattling Locks" – 4:25
6. "Folk Bloodbath" – 5:16
7. "Lark" – 3:04
8. "Lantern" – 5:15
9. "The Remnant" – 3:56
10. "See How Man Was Made" – 3:26
11. "Another New World" – 7:34
12. "Orbital" – 3:29
13. "Long Shadows" – 2:20

== Charts ==
Chart (2010)	Peak position
Irish Independent Albums Chart	1
US Billboard 200 Albums Chart	41
US Billboard Folk Albums Chart	1

== Personnel ==
=== Musicians ===
- Josh Ritter – vocals and guitars, violin
- Zack Hickman – double bass, electric bass, electric guitar, acoustic guitar, hi-strung guitar, omnichord, vibraphone, organ, bass clarinet, percussion, euphonium
- Austin Nevins – electric guitar, acoustic guitar, baritone guitar, e-bow, lap steel, glockenspiel, banjo, mando guitar, baritone ukulele, percussion
- Liam Hurley – drums, percussion
- Sam Kassirer — electric piano, piano, organs, synthesizer, vibraphone, percussion, samples

=== Additional musicians ===
- Dawn Landes — backing vocals
- Allie Moss — backing vocals
- Jesse Neuman – trumpet, electronics
- Rob Jost — French horn
- Tony Barba — tenor saxophone, flute

=== Production ===
- Produced by Sam Kassirer
- Recorded at the Great North Sound Society, Parsonsfield, Maine, from August 2008 to October 2009
- Mixed by Brandon Eggleston at Secret Society, Portland, Oregon
- Engineered by Sam Kassirer, Brandon Eggleston and Dan Cardinal
- Additional recording by Jim Smith at Saltlands Studio, Brooklyn, New York, and by Austin Nevins at Austin's Studio in Somerville, Massachusetts
- Mastered by Jeff Lipton at Peerless Mastering
