= Golden Age of Radio (album) =

Studio album by Josh Ritter
- Released: January 22, 2002
- Recorded: 2000; Undercover East (the garage at his manager’s friend’s house), Soundgun Philadelphia, The Electric Cave Portsmouth, New Hampshire
- Genre: Folk rock; Americana
- Length: 45:54
- Label: Signature
- Producer: Darius Zelkha

Josh Ritter chronology
| Josh Ritter (1999) | Golden Age of Radio (2002) | Me & Jiggs EP (2002) |

Professional ratings
Review scores
| Source | Rating |
|---|---|
| AllMusic | 4/5 stars |
| The Guardian | 4/5 stars |
| PopMatters | Mixed |
| Tiny Mix Tapes | 3/5 marks |

Golden Age of Radio is the second studio album by American singer-songwriter Josh Ritter. It was Ritter's first album to be released nationally after he was signed to Signature Sounds. According to his official website, Golden Age of Radio was originally self-released in 2001 and passed out at shows. This self-pressed version contained a different, solo version of the title track called "Country Song," different mastering, and a different track order.

== Critical reception ==
The album was received enthusiastically by critics, who frequently compared him to musicians such as Nick Drake, Bob Dylan, and Neil Young, but failed to reach a large audience in the United States. The album was a success in Ireland, where, thanks to good word-of-mouth and an opening spot on The Frames' tour followed by frequent headlining gigs, Ritter is now considered "a minor celebrity."

== Track listing ==
All songs written by Josh Ritter.

1. "Come and Find Me" – 3:52
2. "Me & Jiggs" – 3:07
3. "You've Got the Moon" – 3:12
4. "Lawrence KS" – 4:15
5. "Anne" – 3:42
6. "Roll On" – 4:19
7. "Leaving" – 3:56
8. "Other Side" – 3:27
9. "Harrisburg" – 3:55
10. "Drive Away" – 4:09
11. "Golden Age of Radio" – 3:31
12. "Song for the Fireflies" – 4:29

== Personnel ==
- Josh Ritter – voice, guitar, piano
- Zack Hickman – bass, guitar, mandolin, organ
- Jason Humphrey – electric guitar
- Darius Zelkha – drums

== Deluxe edition ==
Golden Age of Radio was reissued on April 7, 2009, as a two-disc Deluxe Edition. The Deluxe Edition includes the complete original studio album along with a second bonus disc. The bonus disc contains solo acoustic versions of the original tracks (re-recorded by Ritter in Nashville of June 2008) as well as b-side and remix tracks, music videos, and a full color lyric and photo booklet.

=== Track listing of Deluxe Edition (Bonus CD) ===
1. "Come and Find Me (Solo Acoustic)" – 4:01
2. "Me & Jiggs (Solo Acoustic)" – 3:01
3. "You've Got the Moon (Solo Acoustic)" – 3:03
4. "Lawrence KS (Solo Acoustic)" – 4:28
5. "Anne (Solo Acoustic)" – 2:21
6. "Roll On (Solo Acoustic)" – 4:00
7. "Leaving (Solo Acoustic)" – 3:13
8. "Other Side (Solo Acoustic)" – 3:35
9. "Harrisburg (Solo Acoustic)" – 3:43
10. "Drive Away (Solo Acoustic)" – 3:39
11. "Golden Age of Radio (Solo Acoustic)" – 4:31
12. "Song for the Fireflies (Solo Acoustic)" – 3:27
13. "A Country Song (Original Recording)" – 3:04
14. "Don't Wake Juniper (Studio B-Side)" – 3:44
15. "Come & Find Me (Jackdrag Remix)" – 4:08
16. "Other Side (Jackdrag Remix)" – 5:50
17. "Me & Jiggs" – Music Video/Multimedia Track
18. "Other Side" – Music Video/Multimedia Track
