= To the Yet Unknowing World =

EP by Josh Ritter
- Released: February 8, 2011; February 15, 2011 (iTunes Digital EP)
- Recorded: The Great North Sound Society, Parsonsfield, ME
- Genre: Folk rock; Americana
- Length: 24:01
- Label: Pytheas Recordings
- Producer: Sam Kassirer

Josh Ritter chronology
So Runs the World Away (2010)	To the Yet Unknowing World (2011)	Josh Ritter & The Royal City Band – Live at The Iveagh Gardens (2011)

To the Yet Unknowing World is a limited-edition EP album by American singer-songwriter Josh Ritter. It was released on February 8, 2011.

== Background ==
The EP features b-sides, demos, and remixes from the So Runs the World Away recording sessions. To the Yet Unknowing World was first made available on Ritter's official website and at his 2011 tour performances. The EP later went on sale in record stores and iTunes, February 15, 2011. The title is from a line in the fifth act of Shakespeare's Hamlet (the title of So Runs the World Away was also from a line of Hamlet, however, from the third act).

In addition to the six songs on the EP, music videos for "The Curse" and "Rattling Locks" were released as well. They were directed by Liam Hurley and Sam Kassirer respectively.

== Track listing ==
All songs written by Josh Ritter.

1. "Galahad" (studio b-side) – 4:17
2. "Tokyo!" (studio b-side) – 3:19
3. "Wild Goose" (for Rainn Wilson's book SoulPancake) – 2:29
4. "Lantern" (acoustic Josh Ritter and Sam Kassirer demo) – 4:47
5. "The Remnant" (Wallpaper remix) – 4:11
6. "Rattling Locks" (Hesta Prynn remix) – 4:58

== Personnel ==
=== Musicians ===
- Josh Ritter — vocals and guitar
- Zack Hickman – bass
- Austin Nevins – guitar
- Liam Hurley – drums and percussion
- Sam Kassirer – piano and keyboard

=== Production ===
- Produced by Sam Kassirer
- Recorded at the Great North Sound Society in Parsonsfield, Maine
- Mastered by Jeff Lipton, Ian Kennedy, and Marla Rice at Peerless Mastering
- Artwork by Matthew Fleming
