= The Animal Years =

Studio album by Josh Ritter
- Released: March 20, 2006
- Recorded: March–May 2005
- Studio: Bear Creek Studios, Engine Studios, and Catherine North
- Genre: Folk rock; Americana
- Length: 49:22
- Label: V2
- Producer: Brian Deck

Josh Ritter chronology
4 Songs Live EP (2005)	The Animal Years (2006)	In the Dark – Live at Vicar Street (2006)

Singles from The Animal Years
- 1. "Girl in the War" Released: April 11, 2006; 2. "Lillian, Egypt" Released: May 29, 2006; 3. "Wolves" Released: July 25, 2006

The Animal Years is the fourth studio album by American singer-songwriter Josh Ritter. The album was originally released in the UK on March 20, 2006, and in the United States on April 11, 2006. It was Ritter's first album released on V2 Records. A double-disc deluxe edition was released in Ireland on January 17, 2010, and in the US on February 15, 2011.

In 2010, Ritter's band was given the name "The Royal City Band" (a reference to the song "Thin Blue Flame" from The Animal Years).

== Background ==
Before performing "Girl in the War" at the 2006 annual dinner of the Center for American Progress in Washington D.C., Ritter stated that he intended to "write about [the United States of America], but [instead] it all came out sounding like a love song."

Ritter has said that the life and work of Mark Twain were a great influence on The Animal Years, in particular Twain's books Life on the Mississippi and Letters from the Earth. When analyzed alongside Twain's biography, lyrics from multiple songs on The Animal Years seem to make textual reference to the life and times of Mark Twain. The most intriguing example may be the enigmatic song "Monster Ballads", which contains references to both the 19th-century decline of the Mississippi River steamboat at the hands of the railroad and the fictional character Huckleberry Finn. Paying homage to Twain, Josh Ritter performed in a white suit while touring to support The Animal Years.

== Critical reception ==
Professional ratings
Aggregate scores
Source	Rating
Metacritic	80/100
Review scores
Source	Rating
AllMusic	4/5 stars
The A.V. Club	A−
The Guardian	4/5 stars
Prefix Magazine	8/10
Slant	3/5 stars

As with Ritter's previous albums, The Animal Years was praised for its lyricism and storytelling. Additionally, the use of piano throughout the album was recognized.

Stephen King rated The Animal Years the best album of 2006 in an article for Entertainment Weekly.

== Track listing ==
All songs written by Josh Ritter.

1. "Girl in the War" – 4:23
2. "Wolves" – 4:04
3. "Monster Ballads" – 4:05
4. "Lillian, Egypt" – 3:24
5. "Idaho" – 3:51
6. "In the Dark" – 4:41
7. "One More Mouth" – 3:29
8. "Good Man" – 4:09
9. "Best for the Best" – 3:58
10. "Thin Blue Flame" – 9:38
11. "Here at the Right Time" – 3:40

== Credits ==
=== Personnel ===
- Josh Ritter – voice, guitar
- Zack Hickman – bass, electric bass, guitar, mandolin, lap steel guitar, Ukulele
- David Hingerty – drums, percussion
- Sam Kassirer – Hammond organ, Wurlitzer, piano, accordion, synthesizer
- Tim Bradshaw – guitar

=== Production ===
- Mixed by Brian Deck
- Mastering by Greg Calbi

== Deluxe edition ==
The Animal Years was reissued as a two-disc deluxe edition, first in Ireland on January 17, 2010, then in the United States on February 15, 2011. The deluxe edition includes the complete original studio album as well as a bonus CD with Ritter performing a solo acoustic version of the entire album (recorded in Nashville in June 2008). The bonus CD also includes four b-sides, an enhanced video for "Lillian, Egypt", new artwork, and liner notes by Tom Ricks.

A vinyl version of the deluxe edition was released in the United States on January 25, 2011. The LP also includes a copy of the bonus acoustic CD.

=== Track listing of deluxe edition (bonus CD) ===
1. "Girl in the War" (Solo Acoustic)
2. "Wolves" (Solo Acoustic)
3. "Monster Ballads" (Solo Acoustic)
4. "Lillian, Egypt" (Solo Acoustic)
5. "Idaho" (Solo Acoustic)
6. "In the Dark" (Solo Acoustic)
7. "One More Mouth" (Solo Acoustic)
8. "Good Man" (Solo Acoustic)
9. "Best for the Best" (Solo Acoustic)
10. "Thin Blue Flame" (Solo Acoustic)
11. "Here at the Right Time" (Solo Acoustic)
12. "Blame It on the Tetons" (written by Modest Mouse)
13. "Harbortown"
14. "Peter Killed the Dragon"
15. "Monster Ballads" (Early Version)
