= Josh Ritter =

American musician (born 1976)

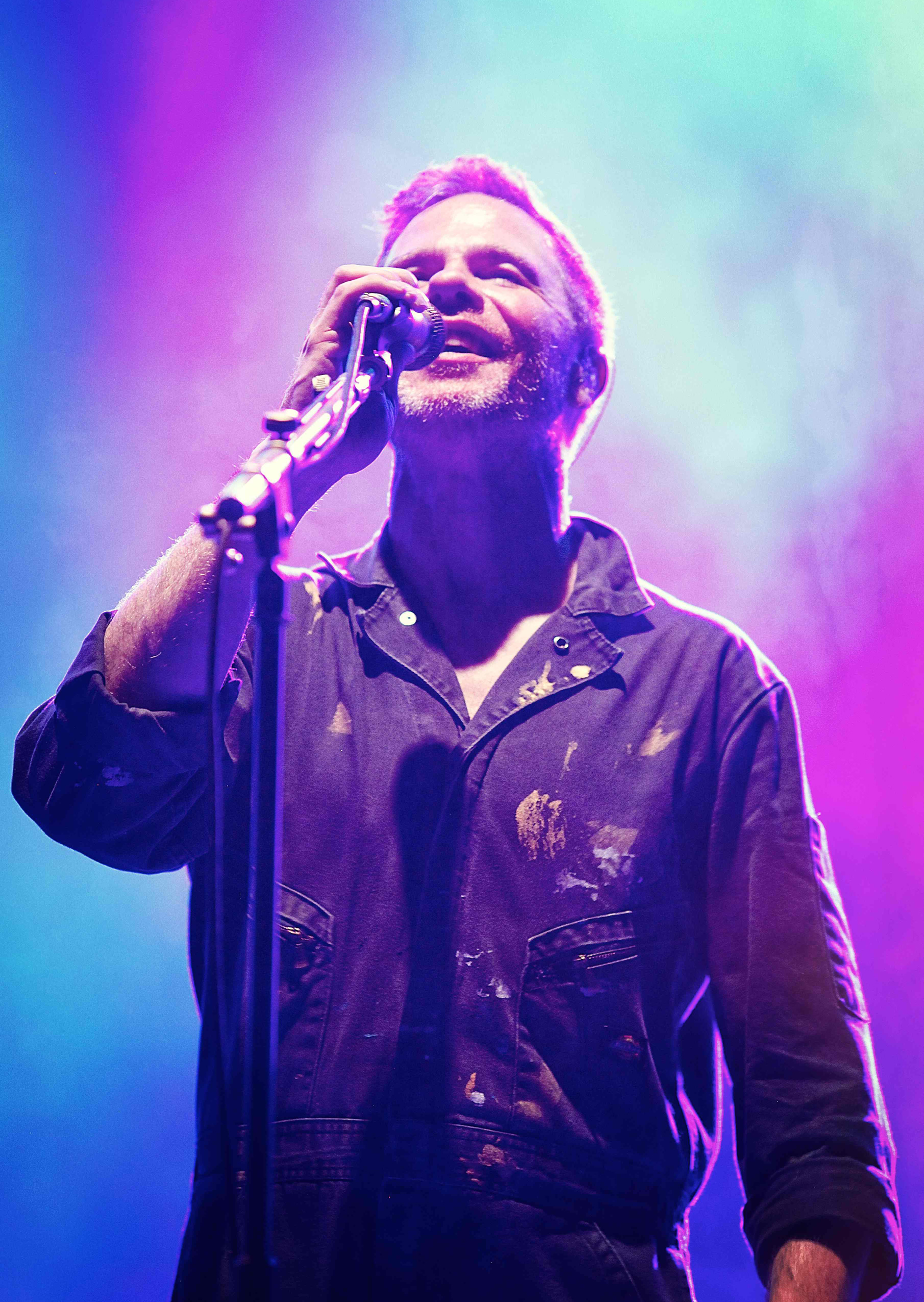
- Ritter performing in February 2016.

Background information
- Born: Joshua B. Ritter; October 21, 1976 (age 50); Moscow, Idaho, U.S.
- Genres: Folk; alternative country; rock; Americana
- Occupations: Singer; songwriter; musician; author
- Instruments: Guitar; piano; lute; violin
- Years active: 1997–present
- Labels: Signature Sounds; V2; Sony BMG; Victor
- Website: Joshritter.com

Joshua B. Ritter (born October 21, 1976) is an American singer, songwriter, musician, and author who performs and records with the Royal City Band. Ritter is known for his distinctive Americana style and narrative lyrics. In 2006, he was named one of the "100 Greatest Living Songwriters" by Paste magazine.

== Early life ==
Ritter was born on October 21, 1976, in Moscow, Idaho, to Robert and Sue Ritter. His fascination with music began when he first heard Johnny Cash and Bob Dylan's "Girl from the North Country" on his parents' copy of Nashville Skyline, and he purchased his first guitar at a local K-Mart. After graduating from Moscow High School in 1995, Ritter attended Oberlin College in Oberlin, Ohio. He initially enrolled in Oberlin's neuroscience program, as his parents were both neuroscientists, but he later created the independent major "American History Through Narrative Folk Music." At the age of 21, Ritter recorded his self-titled debut album at a recording studio on campus.

Following his graduation from Oberlin, Ritter moved to Scotland, where he attended the School of Scottish Studies for six months. From there, he moved to Providence, Rhode Island, working odd jobs and playing open mics in Boston. It was at one such open mic that he met Irish musician Glen Hansard, who invited Ritter to Ireland as an opening act for his band, The Frames.

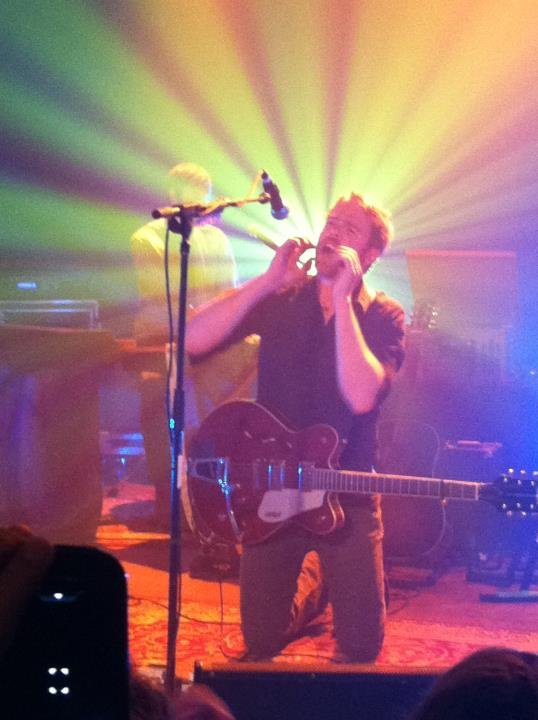
Josh Ritter at the Music Farm in Charleston, SC on 07-26-2011

== Career ==
=== 1999–2002: Self-titled and Golden Age of Radio ===
A year and a half after recording Josh Ritter, Ritter recorded his second album, Golden Age of Radio, for $1000 and self-released it. The album was recorded in three different studios: Soundgun in Philadelphia, Electric Cave in New Hampshire, and a friend's basement studio. While promoting Golden Age of Radio, he met Jim Olsen, head of independent record label Signature Sounds, who offered to remaster and re-release the album after hearing Ritter play. The song "Me & Jiggs" was subsequently released as a single in Ireland, where Ritter was quickly becoming a word-of-mouth success, first opening for the Frames, then headlining his own shows. Ritter's third record, Hello Starling, produced by former Frames guitarist Dave Odlum, debuted at No. 2 on the Irish charts. Ritter claims to have not realized the success of the Irish performances until stopping for a drink between cities and hearing the local band play a set covering his songs, something he was told they did frequently.

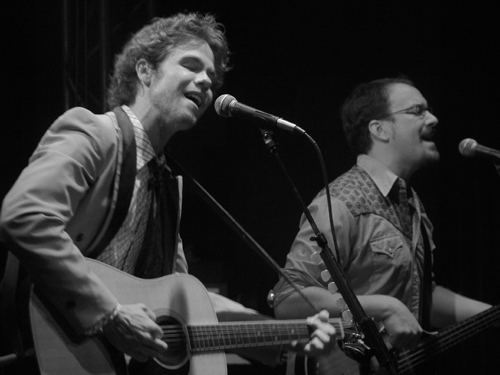
Ritter, left, in concert with longtime bassist Zack Hickman

=== 2003–2009: Hello Starling, The Animal Years, and The Historical Conquests of Josh Ritter ===
In 2003, Ritter shared top billing with the French Kicks at Sepomana, the annual music festival produced by WRMC 91.1 FM. Ritter and Ron Sexsmith headlined the Friday night singer-songwriter event at the Hotel Viking at the 2004 Newport Folk Festival. He also appeared at Oxegen 2005, and has headlined with artists such as Joan Baez, who later released her own version of Ritter's song "Wings" on her album Dark Chords on a Big Guitar. He was signed by a British label, V2 Records, in 2005 and Hello Starling was subsequently re-released. He began performing and touring in a crossover duo with the classical violinist Hilary Hahn in 2005.

In 2006 Ritter released his fourth album The Animal Years. 2006 also saw the release of Ritter's first full-length live album and DVD In the Dark – Live at Vicar Street which was recorded over two nights in May 2006. Ritter released his fifth album, The Historical Conquests of Josh Ritter, in 2007. Both The Animal Years and Historical Conquests received a warm critical reception with Stephen King calling The Animal Years the best album of 2006 in his column for Entertainment Weekly. In support of Historical Conquests, Ritter appeared as a musical guest on such high-profile television shows as Late Show with David Letterman in America and Later... with Jools Holland in Britain.

Ritter re-issued his second and third albums, Golden Age of Radio and Hello Starling, on April 7, 2009 and January 17, 2010, respectively. Each re-issued album was packaged as a two-disc deluxe edition. The deluxe editions contain both the original studio album as well as solo acoustic versions of all the original tracks, live and remixed bonus songs, and never-before-seen photos and artwork. The deluxe editions also feature liner notes written by Ritter fans, including Dennis Lehane and Cameron Crowe.

In Autumn 2009 Ritter toured with Love Canon String Band, where he reinterpreted his songs with a band composed of banjo, double bass, mandolin and guitar. This tour included three nights in Whelans Dublin, where he performed his albums Golden Age of Radio, Hello Starling, and The Animal Years in full. In 2009, Ritter also provided the soundtrack for the documentary film Typeface, by Kartemquin Films.

=== 2011−2013: So Runs the World Away and The Beast in its Tracks ===
Ritter's sixth album, So Runs the World Away, was released April 23, 2010 in Ireland and May 4, 2010 worldwide. The vinyl version of the album had an earlier release on April 17, 2010 as a part of Record Store Day celebrations. The vinyl record came packaged with a CD version of the album as well. To promote the album before its release, Ritter made one of the songs, "Change of Time", freely available online. The song also appeared in the March 23, 2010 episode of the television series Parenthood and the trailer for the 2011 Natalie Portman film The Other Woman. In support of the new album Ritter toured with his newly named Royal City Band – starting with six dates in Ireland – including a sellout performance at the newly opened, 2100-capacity Grand Canal Theatre in Dublin, and continuing with an extensive tour of the United States. So Runs the World Away largely garnered positive reviews.

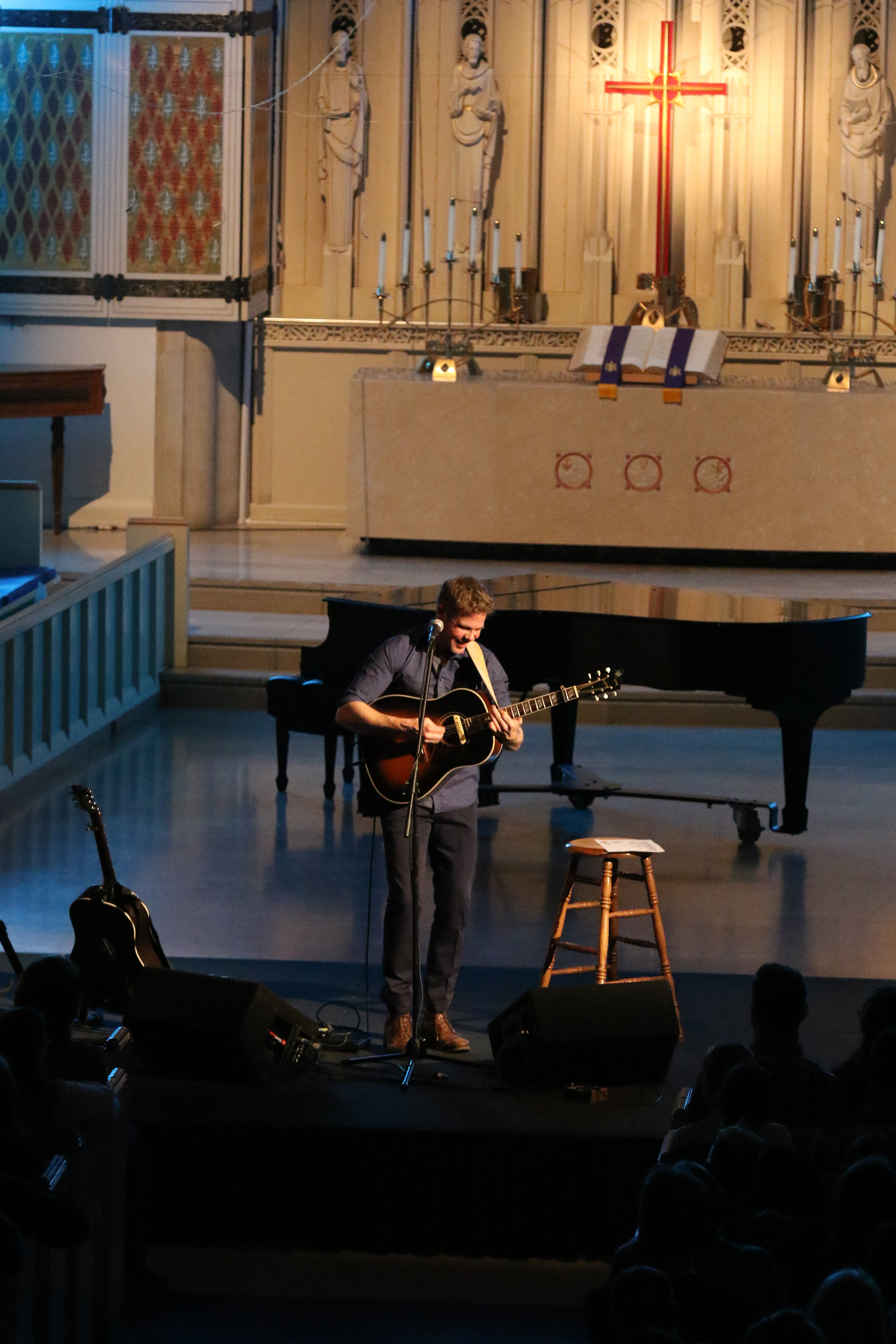
Ritter performing at the Cathedral of the Rockies in 2015.

On February 15, 2011, Ritter reissued The Animal Years on vinyl and as a two-disc deluxe edition on CD. The deluxe edition contains both the original studio album as well as a solo acoustic version of the album. The bonus disc includes four b-side recordings, two videos, new artwork, and liner notes by author Tom Ricks.

During his early 2011 tour, Josh Ritter released an EP album of previously unreleased material from the So Runs the World Away recording sessions, titled To the Yet Unknowing World. Ritter began streaming the EP for free on his website as well as made it available for digital purchase on February 8, 2011. To the Yet Unknowing World hit Apple's iTunes and record stores February 15, 2011. In February 2011, Ritter and his band continued their extensive tour in support of So Runs The World Away, touring America and Europe. During his European tour in April 2011 Ritter released his third live album, Live at The Iveagh Gardens. The limited edition two CD and one DVD set is a live recording of Ritter's performance of 21 songs at the Dublin venue on July 18, 2010.

Ritter’s seventh studio album, The Beast In Its Tracks, was released on March 5, 2013. The album was preceded by singles "Joy To You Baby" and "Hopeful."

=== 2015−2020: Sermon on the Rocks, work with Bob Weir, Gathering, and Fever Breaks ===
On July 27, 2015, Ritter announced his eighth studio album, Sermon on the Rocks. The first single "Getting Ready To Get Down" was premiered the same day. Ritter commented that the inspiration behind the album came from his desire to "play messianic oracular honky-tonk." Sermon on the Rocks was released later that year on October 16, 2015. In 2017, the album’s second single, "Homecoming", received notable attention after being featured in the season 2 finale of Showtime’s Billions.

In 2012, producer Josh Kaufman and members of The National approached Grateful Dead rhythm guitarist & co-frontman Bob Weir to record an album of "cowboy tunes." Songwriting sessions with Kaufman, Weir, & Ritter were soon undertaken, for what would eventually become Weir's third & final solo album, Blue Mountain. Weir's first solo effort in 38 years, after 1978's Heaven Help The Fool, Ritter wrote significant lyrical contributions for all but one song on the 2016 release.

Ritter’s ninth studio album, Gathering, was announced on July 19, 2017. The first single, "Showboat," was released the same day as the album announcement. "[Gathering] is a record of joy and sadness and laughter and lightning," commented Ritter. Along with the announcement of Gathering, Ritter also revealed he was going on an international tour with the Royal City Band. "Thunderbolt’s Goodnight" and "When Will I Be Changed" premiered before Gathering was officially released on September 22, 2017.

On August 28, 2020, Ritter released See Here, I Have Built You a Mansion, an eight-track EP of rare and unreleased songs, some of which were meant to appear on Gathering but "didn't quite fit the shape of that record." The EP also included a live version of "Lawrence, Kansas," as well as a cover of the Dire Straits song "Brothers in Arms." The first single from that album, "Time is Wasting," debuted on August 19, 2020.

=== 2021-Present: Spectral Lines, Heaven, or Someplace as Nice, and I Believe in You, My Honeydew ===
In 2023, Ritter released Spectral Lines. This was followed in 2024 by Heaven, or Someplace as Nice and in 2025 by I Believe in You, My Honeydew. All three of these albums were released on CD, LP, and digital.

== Other ventures ==
Ritter also has an interest in writing, and has claimed many different writers as influences on both his songwriting and fiction work. Some of his favorite authors are Flannery O'Connor, Philip Roth, and Dennis Lehane (who wrote the intro for the Deluxe Edition of Hello Starling). The title of Ritter's sixth album, So Runs the World Away, comes from a line in the third act of Shakespeare's Hamlet.

Ritter's own novel, Bright's Passage, was published by Dial Press on June 28, 2011. He said of the novel, "Besides my songs, Bright's Passage is the first [written] work I've wanted anyone to see ... it's about a kind of sweet normal guy from West Virginia. He goes to the first World War and he comes back and he has an angel. And it's about him and this angel escaping this wildfire for five days. It's sort of this short little comedy." Ritter's second novel, The Great Glorious Goddamn of It All, was published in the U.S. in September 2021.

== Personal life ==
Ritter married fellow musician Dawn Landes in Branson, Missouri, on May 9, 2009. In a February 2011 interview with the Boston Herald, Ritter revealed that they had separated. Ritter and his current partner, author Haley Tanner, own a home together in Woodstock, New York. They had their first child, a daughter named Beatrix Wendylove Ritter, on November 11, 2012.

On November 22, 2009 Ritter played at a benefit concert at Moscow Junior High School, his former junior high school in his hometown of Moscow, Idaho. The concert was for Jim LaFortune, one of Ritter's former teachers, who was diagnosed with a brain tumor.

In May 2018 Ritter revealed that he and his wife had adopted a child in January of that year. Their newest daughter Moxie was matched with them through Wide Horizons For Children, an adoption organization Ritter has advocated for. Part of his Gathering tour was cancelled to accommodate for this new addition to his family, though Ritter has promised to return to those markets for another show.

== The Royal City Band ==
In 2010, Ritter's band members – some of whom had been performing with him from the early 2000s – were given the name "The Royal City Band" (a reference to the song "Thin Blue Flame" from The Animal Years).

Members:

- Josh Ritter – Lead vocals, guitar
- Zack Hickman – Bass, guitar, tuba, strings, vocals
- John Lundahl - Guitar, Vocals
- Sam Kassirer – Piano, keyboards, organ, accordion
- Josh Kaufman– Guitar, lap steel, vocals
- Ray Rizzo – Drums, percussion, vocals

== Discography ==
- Josh Ritter (1999)
- Golden Age of Radio (2002)
- Hello Starling (2003)
- The Animal Years (2006)
- The Historical Conquests of Josh Ritter (2007)
- So Runs the World Away (2010)
- The Beast in Its Tracks (2013)
- Sermon on the Rocks (2015)
- Gathering (2017)
- Fever Breaks (2019)
- Spectral Lines (2023)
- Heaven, or Someplace as Nice (2024)
- I Believe in You, My Honeydew (2025)
