= Primus discography =

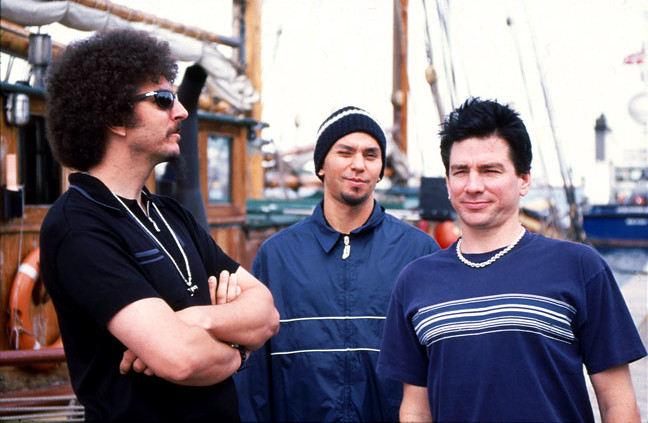
- Studio albums: 9
- Extended plays: 5
- Live albums: 1
- Compilation albums: 2
- Singles: 21
- Video albums: 6
- Music videos: 20

This is a discography for the American rock band Primus. For individual songs, see the category listing.

== Albums ==
=== Studio albums ===
Year	Album details	Peak chart positions											Certifications
Year	Album details	US	AUS	BEL (FL)	BEL (WA)	CAN	FIN	GER	NLD	NZ	SWI	UK	Certifications
1990	Frizzle Fry: Released: February 7, 1990; Label: Caroline/Prawn Song	—	178	—	—	—	—	—	—	—	—	—	
1991	Sailing the Seas of Cheese: Released: May 14, 1991; Label: Interscope	116	111	—	—	—	—	—	—	—	—	—	RIAA: Platinum
1993	Pork Soda: Released: April 20, 1993; Label: Interscope	7	54	—	—	—	—	—	46	45	—	56	RIAA: Platinum
1995	Tales from the Punchbowl: Released: May 23, 1995; Label: Interscope	8	8	—	—	—	33	—	—	—	—	101	RIAA: Gold; MC: Gold
1997	Brown Album: Released: July 8, 1997; Label: Interscope	21	34	—	—	—	14	99	—	—	—	180	
1999	Antipop: Released: October 19, 1999; Label: Interscope/Prawn Song	44	33	—	—	—	39	—	—	—	—	—	
2011	Green Naugahyde: Released: September 12, 2011; Label: ATO/Prawn Song	15	139	84	95	27	21	100	62	—	74	115	
2014	Primus & the Chocolate Factory with the Fungi Ensemble: Released: October 21, 2014; Label: ATO/Prawn Song	17	116	148	—	—	—	—	—	—	—	—	
2017	The Desaturating Seven: Released: September 29, 2017; Label: ATO/Prawn Song	26	97	105	136	59	—	—	—	—	—	—	
"—" denotes a release that did not chart or was not released in that territory.

=== Live albums ===
Year	Album details
1989	Suck on This: Released: November 1989; Label: Prawn Song/Caroline; formats: Vinyl, CS, CD

=== Compilation albums ===
Year	Album details	Peak chart positions
Year	Album details	US
2006	They Can't All Be Zingers: Released: October 17, 2006; Label: Interscope	105
2022	The Revenant Juke: A Collection of Fables and Farce: Released: September 2022; Label: Third Man	–

== Extended plays ==
Year	Album details	Peak chart positions			Certifications
Year	Album details	US	AUS	NLD	Certifications
1992	Miscellaneous Debris: Released: March 12, 1992; Label: Interscope	—	69	—	
1998	Rhinoplasty: Released: August 11, 1998; Label: Interscope/Prawn Song	106	81	97	
2003	Animals Should Not Try to Act Like People: Released: October 7, 2003; Label: Interscope/Prawn Song	44	—	—	RIAA: Platinum
2010	June 2010 Rehearsal: Released: August 5, 2010; Label: Prawn Song	—	—	—	
2022	Conspiranoid: Released: April 22, 2022; Label: ATO	—	—	—	
2026	A Handful of Nuggs: Released: May 15, 2026; Label: ATO	—	—	—	
"—" denotes a release that did not chart or was not released in that territory.

== Singles ==
Year	Title	Peak chart positions				Album
Year	Title	US Airplay	US Alt.	US Main.	AUS	Album
1991	"Jerry Was a Race Car Driver"	—	23	—	—	Sailing the Seas of Cheese
1991	"Tommy the Cat"	—	—	—	—	Sailing the Seas of Cheese
1992	"Making Plans for Nigel"	—	30	—	—	Miscellaneous Debris
1993	"My Name Is Mud"	—	9	—	—	Pork Soda
1993	"DMV"	—	—	—	—	Pork Soda
1993	"Mr. Krinkle"	—	—	—	—	Pork Soda
1995	"Wynona's Big Brown Beaver"	62	12	23	80	Tales from the Punchbowl
1995	"Mrs. Blaileen"	—	—	—	139	Tales from the Punchbowl
1995	"Southbound Pachyderm"	—	—	—	—	Tales from the Punchbowl
1997	"Shake Hands with Beef"	—	—	—	—	Brown Album
1997	"Over the Falls"	—	—	—	—	Brown Album
1999	"Lacquer Head"	—	—	—	—	Antipop
1999	"Electric Uncle Sam"	—	—	—	—	Antipop
2000	"N.I.B." (featuring Ozzy Osbourne)	—	—	2	—	Nativity in Black II: A Tribute to Black Sabbath
2010	"Me Llamo Mud"	—	—	—	—	Non-album single
2011	"Tragedy's a' Comin'"	—	—	—	—	Green Naugahyde
2011	"Lee Van Cleef"	—	—	—	—	Green Naugahyde
2022	"Conspiranoia"	—	—	—	—	Conspiranoid
2025
2025	"Little Lord Fentanyl"	—	—	—	—	A Handful of Nuggs
"—" denotes a release that did not chart or was not released in that territory.

== Videos ==
=== Video albums ===
Year	Album details	Certifications
1992	Cheesy Home Video: Released: May 12, 1992; Label: Atlantic; Format: VHS	
1998	Horrible Swill: A Tawdry Look at Primus on the Road in 1998: Released: March 3, 1998; Label: Fan club exclusive; Format: VHS	
1998	Videoplasty: Released: December 29, 1998; Label: Interscope/Prawn Song; Format: VHS	
2003	Animals Should Not Try to Act Like People: Released: October 7, 2003; Label: Interscope/Prawn Song; Format: DVD	RIAA: Platinum
2004	Hallucino-Genetics: Live 2004: Released: November 16, 2004; Label: Prawn Song; Format: DVD	RIAA: Gold; MC: Gold
2006	Blame It on the Fish: An Abstract Look at the 2003 Primus Tour de Fromage: Released: October 17, 2006; Label: Prawn Song; Format: DVD	

=== Music videos ===
Primus hired many of their friends from the Bay Area to be in the stage crew, and many of them appear in Primus's videos and home videos.

Song	Director	Released	Notes
"John the Fisherman"	Mark Kohr	1990	Kirk Hammett appears in the video.
"Too Many Puppies"	Kevin Kerslake	1990	Never officially released.
"Jerry Was a Race Car Driver"	Mark Kohr	1991	Bob Cock appears in the beginning clip. Live footage shot at the Phoenix Theater in Petaluma, CA.
"Tommy the Cat"	Mark Kohr	1991	Shot entirely in black and white, with clips of black and white animation.
"My Name Is Mud"	Mark Kohr	1993	Bob Cock appears throughout the video.
"DMV"	Mark Kohr	1993	The band was asked to make this video by the record label.
"Mr. Krinkle"	Mark Kohr	1993	The camera does not move during the entire video; shot in one take.
"Wynona's Big Brown Beaver"	Les Claypool	1995	Shot at Rancho Relaxo, Claypool's home. Shot at 3/4 speed to give the band irregular and strange movements when played at normal speed.
"Southbound Pachyderm"	Les Claypool	1995	Entirely claymated, except for the band appearing on a TV.
"The Devil Went Down to Georgia"	Mike Johnson	1996	Entirely claymated.
"Shake Hands With Beef"	Les Claypool	1997	This was also shot at 3/4 speed, giving the band irregular and odd movements at normal speed. LaLonde also goes for a fly during his solo. Trailer scenes shot at Rancho Relaxo.
"Over the Falls"	Les Claypool	1997	Shot entirely in black and white. Outdoor live footage shot at Baker Beach in San Francisco, CA.
"Lacquer Head"	Les Claypool	1999	Blends claymation and real video. Including clips from many previous music videos. Banned by MTV because of drug references, despite being an anti-drug song.
"Tragedy's a' Comin'"	Les Claypool & Mark Kohr	2011	Features Les Claypool dressed as a giant lobster in a tank at a restaurant, watching how the other lobsters are being eaten by socialites. In the meantime, lobster Claypool fantasizes about being on a beach.
"Lee Van Cleef"	Team Coco	2012	An entirely animated video set up in a fictional "The Good, The Band & The Ugly" world, showing a hanged Lee Van Cleef coming back to life to kill Clint Eastwood.
"Jilly's On Smack"	Jordan Copeland	2012	The video, directed by The Police drummer Steward Copeland's son, Jordan, consists of live performance of the band interspersed with old, grainy footage of Christmas-themed family life.
"HOINFODAMAN"	Team Hiho	2015	Winner of a video contest.
"Candyman"	Ivan Landau, Edgar Alvarez & Webster Colcord	2015	Entirely claymated.
"Conspiranoia"	Cage Claypool	2022	
"Follow The Fool"	Cage Claypool	2022	
"The Ol' Grizz"	Cage Claypool	2026	

== Other appearances ==
1988 - Germ's Choice: A KUSF Compilation (promo for KUSF radio, featuring the demo version of "Tommy the Cat")
1991 - A Different Sound (promo for Carlsberg Light lager, featuring "Tommy the Cat")
1992 - Plan B: the questionable video features Here come the bastards, Tommy the cat.
1991 - Bill & Ted's Bogus Journey (soundtrack, featuring "Tommy the Cat")
1991 - Expand-O: CD Tune Up 12 (featuring "Jerry Was a Race Car Driver")
1993 - The Beavis and Butt-head Experience (soundtrack, featuring the original track "Poetry and Prose")
1993 - In Defense of Animals (benefit compilation album, featuring "Too Many Puppies")
1993 - Lollapalooza '93 (sampler, featuring studio version of "Mr. Krinkle")
1994 - Airheads (soundtrack, featuring the original track "Bastardizing Jellikit")
1994 - Brainscan (soundtrack, featuring "Welcome to This World")
1994 - Caroline Records 1994 Sampler (promo for Caroline Records, featuring "John the Fisherman")
1994 - Woodstock 1994 (live album, featuring "Those Damned Blue Collar Tweekers")
1995 - Obdurate (promo for HM magazine, featuring a live version of "Here Come the Bastards")
1995 - Phuq! (featuring "Wynona's Big Brown Beaver")
1996 - Bored Generation (featuring "Hellbound 17½")
1996 - Eyesore: A Stab at The Residents (The Residents tribute album, featuring the Primus cover of "Hello Skinny/Constantinople")
1996 - Music for Our Mother Ocean, Vol. 1 (promo for the Surfrider Foundation, featuring a live version of "Mr. Knowitall")
1996 - X Games Volume 1: Music from the Edge (promo for ESPN's X Games, featuring "Jerry Was a Race Car Driver")
1997 - Crossing All Over!: Volume 6 (featuring "Shake Hands with Beef")
1997 - Rock Sound: Volume 10 (promo for Rock Sound magazine, featuring "Shake Hands with Beef")
1997 - Universal Attaque!: Vol. 1 (featuring "Shake Hands with Beef")
1997 - Zoo Magazine: CD Sampler 10 (promo for Zoo magazine, featuring "My Name is Mud")
1998 - Chef Aid: The South Park Album (soundtrack, featuring the original tracks "South Park Theme" and "Mephisto and Kevin")
1998 - Indie 2000: Volume 3 (featuring "Shake Hands with Beef")
1998 - Interscope Sampler: Volume One (promo for Interscope Records, featuring the Primus cover of Stanley Clarke's "Silly Putty")
1998 - The New, the Classic & the Unexplored: Volume Three (promo for Visions magazine, featuring "To Defy the Laws of Tradition")
1998 - Pinkpop 1998 Sampler (featuring a live version of "Bob's Party Time Lounge")
1998 - Tijdloze Honderd: Vol 4 (featuring "Too Many Puppies")
1999 - Celebrity Deathmatch (soundtrack, featuring the studio version of "The Heckler")
1999 - Family Values Tour 1999 (live album, featuring "Lacquer Head" and "My Name is Mud")
1999 - Jack Kerouac Reads On the Road (Jack Kerouac compilation, featuring a cover of "On the Road" recorded by Tom Waits and Primus)
1999 - The New, the Classic & the Unexplored: Volume Nine (promo for Visions magazine, featuring "South Park Theme")
1999 - Opscene: CD#11 (featuring "Mama Didn't Raise No Fool")
1999 - Take Off 2000: Loud Music for the Next Millenium (featuring "Lacquer Head")
1999 - Visions 75th Anniversary Compilation: Part II (promo for Visions magazine, featuring the Primus cover of Pink Floyd's "Have a Cigar")
2000 - Big Noize (featuring "Electric Uncle Sam")
2000 - Nativity in Black II (Black Sabbath tribute album featuring a cover of "N.I.B." recorded by Primus and Ozzy Osbourne)
2003 - Triple J's Hottest 100 10th Anniversary: Hottest Box (promo for Triple J radio's Hottest 100, featuring "Wynona's Big Brown Beaver")
2004 - Alternative Rock Edition (featuring "Too Many Puppies")
2004 - Bonnaroo Music Festival 2004 (live album, featuring "Frizzle Fry")
2005 - Prince of Darkness (Ozzy Osbourne box set, featuring the cover of "N.I.B." recorded by Primus and Osbourne)
2005 - Triple J's Super Request: Dog's Breakfast (promo for Triple J radio's Super Request, featuring "Electric Uncle Sam")
2006 - Orphans: Brawlers, Bawlers & Bastards (Tom Waits compilation, featuring the cover of "On the Road" recorded by Primus and Waits)
2008 - Zack and Miri Make a Porno (soundtrack, featuring "Wynona's Big Brown Beaver")

Video compilations
2004 - Live from Bonnaroo Music Festival 2004 (DVD)

Television show theme songs
1997-2000 - South Park: seasons 1-4 ("South Park Theme", released on Chef Aid, 1998)
2000-2006 - South Park: seasons 4-10 (various remixes of "South Park Theme", unreleased)
2006-present - South Park: seasons 10-14 (mashup of "South Park Theme" and "Whamola" by Les Claypool's Frog Brigade, unreleased)

Video game soundtracks
1995 - Beavis and Butt-head in Virtual Stupidity (featuring "DMV")
1999 - Hot Wheels Turbo Racing (featuring "Hamster Style")
1999 - Tony Hawk's Pro Skater (featuring "Jerry Was a Race Car Driver")
2000 - Vampire: The Masquerade – Redemption (featuring "Electric Uncle Sam")
2001 - ATV Offroad Fury (featuring "Jerry Was a Race Car Driver")
2006 - Guitar Hero 2 (featuring "John the Fisherman")
2006 - Tony Hawk's Project 8 (featuring "American Life")
2010 - Rock Band 3 (featuring "Jerry Was a Race Car Driver")
2014 - Rocksmith (featuring "Jerry Was a Race Car Driver, "Tommy the Cat", "Wynona's Big Brown Beaver", "South Park Theme")

== See also ==
- Riddles Are Abound Tonight - album by the 1988 Primus lineup under the name Sausage.
- Lance "Link" Montoya - the original cover sculptor for Suck On This, Frizzle Fry, Sailing the Seas of Cheese, Pork Soda, and Animals Should Not Try to Act Like People.
