= One-shot film =

Film genre

A one-shot film (also known as a one-take film, single-take film, or continuous shot feature film) is a full-length movie filmed in one long take by a single camera, or manufactured to give the impression it was.

== History ==
Grode notes that before such films as 1917 and Birdman, the idea of experimenting with long uninterrupted takes had a history of over 80 years, with Alfred Hitchcock being a pioneer. Aside from early experiments like Young and Innocent and Notorious, the most famous early example of a film that extensively uses long takes is the 1948 Rope, which was shot in mainly seven-to-ten–minute continuous takes (the physical limit of film stock at the time) that appear as four long takes of around 15 to 20 minutes each, close to the maximum length allowed by the cinema projectors of the time. Reportedly, James Stewart, star of Rope, did not like the long takes and apparently muttered on set that the cameras were more important than the actors. Hitchcock intended to shoot the film as if it were a play, and timed five of the ten segments to allow for hidden edits behind furniture; elaborate camera and actor choreography was used. He wrote Rope this way because he felt "if time passed between cuts, the suspense of whether the body was still in the trunk would be lost".

Grode also examines the 1958 film Touch of Evil as an example, though only its three-minute opening sequence is shot in real time. However, the use of a real time ticking bomb through the single shot is seen as a standard.

The Wolf House (2018) is a deconstructed example of (stop-motion) animation that presented in a form of single, unbroken shot sequence.

In a 2019 article, discussing the award-winning film 1917 (2019), Eric Grode of The New York Times wrote that very long takes were becoming popular in more mainstream films "as a sobering reminder of temporality, a virtuosic calling card, a self-issued challenge or all of the above", also citing the Academy Award-winner from several years prior, Birdman (2014).

== Notable examples ==
=== Actual "one shot" ===
Year	Title	Length	Director	Nationality	Ref.
1982	Macbeth	57 min. (longest shot) (Note: One five-minute shot and the film's opening credits precede the film's 57 minute main shot.)	Béla Tarr	Hungary	
1990	C'est Vrai (One Hour)	60 min.	Robert Frank	France	
1998	Big Monday	74 min.	Michael Rehfield	United States	
2000	Timecode	97 min.	Mike Figgis	United States	
2002	Russian Ark	96 min.	Alexander Sokurov	Russia	
2003	Sábado	65 min.	Matías Bize	Chile	
2007	Alternation	11 min	Mehdi Fard Ghaderi	Iran	
2007	PVC-1	85 min.	Spiros Stathoulopoulos	Colombia	
2008	Still Orangutans	81 min.	Gustavo Spolidero	Brazil	
2011	Reversing Circles	21 min.	Mehdi Fard Ghaderi	Iran	
2011	short cut	112 min. single shot in one take.	Koki Mitani	Japan	
2013	Rati Chakravyuh	102 min.	Ashish Avikunthak	India	
2013	Fish & Cat	134 min.	Shahram Mokri	Iran	
2013	El triste olor de la carne	87 min.	Cristóbal Arteaga	Spain	
2013	Ana Arabia	85 min.	Amos Gitai	Israel	
2013	Somebody Marry Me	98 min.	John Asher	United States	
2013	Airport 2013	98 min. single shot in one take.	Koki Mitani	Japan	
2014	Agadam	123 min.	Mohamad Issack	India	
2015	Victoria	140 min.	Sebastian Schipper	Germany	
2015	Anino sa Likod ng Buwan	120 min.	Jun Robles Lana	Philippines	
2015	The Story Of A Rainy Night	24 min	Mehdi Fard Ghaderi	Iran	
2015	Daksha	142 min.	S. Narayan	India	
2016	Paint Drying	607 min.	Charlie Shackleton	United Kingdom	
2016	Eight	81 min.	Peter Blackburn	Australia	
2016	Immortality	145 min.	Mehdi Fard Ghaderi	Iran	
2016	King Dave	99 min.	Podz	Canada	
2017	Ice Cream and the Sound of Raindrops	74 min.	Daigo Matsui	Japan	
2017	Fourplay	77 min.	Dean Ronalds	United States	
2017	The Wedding Party	119 min.	Thane Economou	United States	
2017	One Shot-Fear Without Cut	140 min.	Haroon Rashid	India	
2017	Watch The Sunset	83 min.	Tristan Barr & Michael Gosden	Australia	
2017	One Cut of the Dead	37 min. one-take sequence	Shin'ichiro Ueda	Japan	
2017	Lost in London	103 min.	Woody Harrelson	United Kingdom	
2018	Heegondhu Dina	106.11 min	Vikram Yoganand	India	
2018	The Silent Pasture of Sparrows	20 min.	Qmars Mootab	United States	
2018	Utøya: July 22	90 min.	Erik Poppe	Norway	
2018	Blind Spot	98 min.	Tuva Novotny	Norway	
2018	Jaalo	101 min	Araaj Keshav Giri	Nepal	
2018	Tatort: Die Musik stirbt zuletzt	88 min.	Dani Levy	Switzerland	
2018	A Boy. A Girl. A Dream: Love on Election Night	89 min.	Qasim Basir	United States	
2019	Last Call	77 min.	Gavin Michael Booth	Canada	
2019	Shonibar Bikel	83 min	Mostofa Sarwar Farooki	Bangladesh	
2020	Limbo	89 min.	Tim Dünschede	Germany	
2020	City Lights	102 min.	Malte Wirtz	Germany	
2020	Let's Scare Julie	83 min.	Jud Cremata	United States	
2021	Boiling Point	94 min.	Philip Barantini	United Kingdom	
2021	Causalidad	115 min.	Who (Marcelo Politano)	Argentina	
2021	Santhoshathinte Onnam Rahasyam	85 min.	Don Palathara	India	
2021	Rendez-Vous	105 min.	Pablo Olmos Arrayales	Mexico	
2021	Roaring 20's	85 min.	Elisabeth Vogler	France	
2022	Iravin Nizhal	98 min	R. Parthiban	India	
2022	Yuddha Kaandam	90 min	Anantharajan	India	
2022	The Punishment	86 min	Matías Bize	Chile	
2023	Tales from the Neighborhood Café	41 min.	Al Hallak	United States	
2023	The Night Inside	23 min	Antonio Cuesta	Spain	
2023	Failure!	87 min.	Alex Kahuam	Mexico - United States	
2024	MadS	88 min.	David Moreau	France	
2024	Assemblage	92 min.	Sofiene Mamdi	France	
2024	An Order From the Sky	72 min.	Karthi Radhakrishnan	India	
2025	Oi,Dazai	101 min. single shot in one take.	Koki Mitani	Japan	
2025	Gunman	80 min.	Cristian Tapia Marchiori	Argentina	
2025	The Deadline	91 min.	Tong Hui	China	
2025	One Shot with Ed Sheeran	60 min.	Philip Barantini	United Kingdom	

=== Edited to appear as "one shot" ===
Year	Title	Length	Director	Nationality	Notes	Ref.
2010	The Silent House	86 min.	Gustavo Hernández	Uruguay		
2011	Silent House	87 min.	Chris Kentis, Laura Lau	United States	An American remake of the 2010 Uruguayan film The Silent House.	
2014	Birdman	119 min.	Alejandro González Iñárritu	United States		
2019	The Body Remembers When the World Broke Open	105 min.	Elle-Máijá Tailfeathers and Kathleen Hepburn	Canada	Edited to appear as two shots, actually 12 hidden cuts. Shot on 16mm film, used "Real-Time Transitioning" camera techniques to account for film size limits.	
2019	1917	118 min.	Sam Mendes	United Kingdom	Actually edited to appear as two shots, with the camera cutting to black as the protagonist gets knocked out half-way.	
2020	Beyond the Infinite Two Minutes	70 min.	Junta Yamaguchi	Japan		
2021	One Shot	97 min.	James Nunn	United Kingdom		
2022	Soft and Quiet	92 min.	Beth de Araujo	United States		
2022	Medusa Deluxe	100 min.	Thomas Hardiman	United Kingdom		
2023	Shttl	114 min.	Ady Walter	Ukraine		
2024	One More Shot	102 min.	James Nunn	United Kingdom		

== Music videos ==
Artist	Song	Year	Note
Shakatak	Down on the Street	1984	
Split Enz	Message to My Girl	1984	
Steve Perry	Foolish Heart	1984	
Tommy Shaw	Girls With Guns	1984	
Cutting Crew	(I Just) Died in Your Arms	1986	
Janet Jackson	When I Think of You	1986	
Peter Gabriel & Kate Bush	Don't Give Up	1986	
The Psychedelic Furs	Angels Don't Cry	1986	
The Replacements	Bastards of Young	1986	
Bruce Springsteen	Brilliant Disguise	1987	
Icehouse	Crazy (Australian version)	1987	
INXS	Guns in the Sky	1987	
Mental as Anything	He's Just No Good for You	1987	
Godley & Creme	10,000 Angels	1988	
Underworld	Underneath The Radar	1988	
Paco	Amor de mis Amores (Love of My Loves)	1988	Directed by Thibaut Chatel
The Grapes of Wrath	All the Things I Wasn't	1989	
Pixies	Velouria	1990	
Sinéad O'Connor	Nothing Compares 2 U	1990	
Vaya Con Dios	Nah Neh Nah	1990	
Massive Attack	Unfinished Sympathy	1991	Directed by Baillie Walsh
Guns N' Roses	Garden of Eden	1992	Directed by Andy Morahan
Thalía	Love	1992	2 versions
Janet Jackson	That's the Way Love Goes	1993	One-take version
Toni Braxton	Another Sad Love Song	1993	Directed by Antoine Fuqua
Die Krupps	To The Hilt	1994	
Gin Blossoms	Allison Road	1994	Directed by Sean Alquist
Lisa Loeb	Stay (I Missed You)	1994	Directed by Ethan Hawke
Lucas	Lucas with the Lid Off	1994	
Massive Attack	Protection	1994	Directed by Michel Gondry
Nine Inch Nails	March of the Pigs	1994	
Roxette	Crash! Boom! Bang!	1994	
Tom Petty	You Don't Know How It Feels	1994	Directed by Phil Joanou
Weezer	Undone – The Sweater Song	1994	Directed by Spike Jonze
You Am I	Berlin Chair	1994	
Lords of the Underground	Neva Faded	1995	
Paulina Rubio	Te Daría Mi Vida	1995	Directed by Carlos Marcovich
Spirit of the West	Tell Me What I Think	1995	Directed by Morris Panych
Wax	California	1995	Directed by Spike Jonze
2Pac	Made Niggaz	1996	360 Version
Alanis Morissette	Head Over Feet	1996	Directed by Michele Laurita and Alanis Morissette
Cibo Matto	Sugar Water	1996	Two continuous shots playing simultaneously
Daft Punk	Fresh	1996	
Garbage	Milk	1996	
Madonna	Love Don't Live Here Anymore	1996	Directed by Jean-Baptiste Mondino
Tracy Bonham	Mother Mother	1996	Directed by Jake Scott
Spice Girls	Wannabe	1996	Directed by Johan Camitz
Ben Folds Five	Kate	1997	
Björk	Hunter	1997	
Erykah Badu	Otherside of the Game	1997	
Fiona Apple	Never Is a Promise	1997	
Green Day	Redundant	1997	
Mashina Vremeni	Он был старше её (He was older than she)	1997	
Michael Penn	Try	1997	Directed by Paul Thomas Anderson
The Tea Party	Babylon	1997	
Tic Tac Toe	Bitte küss' mich nicht	1997	
A Tribe Called Quest	Find A Way	1998	
Die Ärzte	Rebell	1998	
Radiohead	No Surprises	1998	
Shakira	Tú	1998	
TISM	Thunderbirds are Coming Out	1998	
The Tragically Hip	Poets	1998	
Xzibit	What U See Is What U Get	1998	
Glay	Winter, Again	1999	First version
Los Tres	No Me Falles	1999	
Semisonic	Closing Time	1999	Two continuous shots playing simultaneously
Sky	Some Kinda Wonderful	1999	
Smashing Pumpkins	Ava Adore	1999	
Coldplay	Yellow	2000	
D'Angelo	Untitled (How Does It Feel)	2000	
Mondo Grosso	Now You Know Better	2000	
Destiny's Child	Emotion	2001	Three continuous shots playing simultaneously
Elton John	I Want Love	2001	
Green Day	Macy's Day Parade	2001	
Hawksley Workman	Jealous of Your Cigarette	2001	
Hyde	Evergreen	2001	
Jay-Z	Girls, Girls, Girls	2001	
R.E.M.	Imitation Of Life	2001	
Radiohead	Knives Out	2001	
Tift Merritt	Virginia, No One Can Warn You	2001	
Ayumi Hamasaki	Daybreak	2002	
Hikaru Utada	Hikari	2002	
Koshi Inaba	ファミレス午前3時 (Family Restaurant at 3 AM)	2002	After the title card
Kylie Minogue	Come into My World	2002	
Will Young with Gareth Gates	The Long and Winding Road	2002	
Beginner	Fäule	2003	
Christina Aguilera	The Voice Within	2003	
Nicole	Vida	2003	
Shania Twain	When You Kiss Me	2003	One Take version
Zander featuring Alexis Hart	What’s Up	2003	
Melissa Tkautz	The Glamorous Life	2005	
Busted	Crashed The Wedding	2004	
George Michael	Flawless (Go to the City)	2004	
Jorge Drexler	Milonga del moro judío	2004	
Architecture in Helsinki	It'5	2005	
Ayumi Hamasaki	Heaven	2005	
Jack Johnson	Sitting, Waiting, Wishing	2005	
James Blunt	You're Beautiful	2005	
Missy Higgins	The Special Two	2005	
OK Go	A Million Ways	2005	
The White Stripes	The Denial Twist	2005	
Wir sind Helden	Nur ein Wort (Only One Word)	2005	Forwards and backwards
Dendemann	3½ Minuten	2006	
Dilated Peoples	Back Again	2006	
Gary Jules	Mad World	2006	
Gimma	Superschwiizer	2006	
OK Go	Here It Goes Again	2006	
The Rumble Strips	Motorcycle	2006	
Sandi Thom	I Wish I Was a Punk Rocker (With Flowers in My Hair)	2006	
Sportfreunde Stiller	'54, '74, '90, 2006	2006	
Bedouin Soundclash	Walls Fall Down	2007	
Feist	1234	2007	
Feist	My Moon My Man	2007	
Jack Peñate	Second, Minute or Hour	2007	
Kaiser Chiefs	Love's Not a Competition (But I'm Winning)	2007	
Lil' Chris	We Don't Have to Take Our Clothes Off	2007	
Linkin Park	Bleed It Out	2007	
The Matches	Salty Eyes	2007	
Melanie C	The Moment You Believe	2007	
Panda	Los Malaventurados No Lloran	2007	
Paul Kelly	God Told Me To	2007	Directed by Natasha Pinkus
Snow Patrol	Open Your Eyes	2007	
Spoon	The Underdog	2007	
The Weakerthans	Civil Twilight	2007	
Basia Bulat	In the Night	2008	Directed and produced by Anthony Seck
Dana Nalbaru	Tu	2008	
Faker	Sleepwalking	2008	
Feist	I Feel It All	2008	
Gigi	11 Januari	2008	
Goldfrapp	Happiness	2008	
Janet Jackson	Rock with U	2008	
The Last Shadow Puppets	Standing Next to Me	2008	
Lil Wayne	A Milli	2008	
Robyn	Eclipse	2008	Directed by Blip Boutique
Sara Bareilles	Gravity	2008	
Vampire Weekend	A-Punk	2008	
Vampire Weekend	Oxford Comma	2008	
The Vines	He's a Rocker	2008	
Young Righchus And Max Berry	Ridin'	2008	
Arctic Monkeys	Cornerstone	2009	
Cheryl and Will.i.am	3 Words	2009	
Electric Indian	Kids These Days	2009	
Jovanotti	Mezzogiorno	2009	
Mayer Hawthorne	Your Easy Lovin' Ain't Pleasin' Nothin'	2009	
Metric	Gimme Sympathy	2009	
Myriam Fares	Ayam El Shety	2009	
OK Go	WTF?	2009	
Perfume	I still love U	2009	
Sarah Blasko	We Won't Run	2009	
Super Junior	It's You	2009	
Against Me!	I Was a Teenage Anarchist	2010	
Air	So Light Is Her Footfall	2010	
Antonio Orozco	Llevatelo	2010	
Cosmo Jarvis	Gay Pirates	2010	
Die Roten Punkte	Bananenhaus (Banana House)	2010	
Die Roten Punkte	Burger Store Dinosaur	2010	
Erykah Badu	Window Seat	2010	
Francis and the Lights	Darling, It's Alright	2010	
Grace Potter	Something That I Want	2010	From the movie Tangled
Hikaru Utada	Goodbye Happiness	2010	
J. Cole	Who Dat	2010	
Janelle Monáe	Cold War	2010	
Kelis	Brave	2010	
Liam Frost	Good Things Are Coming Our Way	2010	
Lights	Second Go	2010	
Marina and the Diamonds	I Am Not a Robot	2010	LA Version; from 00:05 and onwards
OK Go	White Knuckles	2010	
Pablo Alborán	Solamente Tú	2010	
Säkert	Dansa fastän	2010	
A Banda Mais Bonita da Cidade	Oração	2011	
AKB48	Dakishimecha Ikenai	2011	
Anneke van Giersbergen	Feel Alive	2011	
The Pigs featuring John Williamson	Single Ladies (Put a Ring On It)	2011	
Birdy	Skinny Love	2011	One Take version
The Black Keys	Lonely Boy	2011	
Bruno Mars	The Lazy Song	2011	Official version
Childish Gambino	Freaks and Geeks	2011	
Enrique Iglesias	Ayer	2011	
Josh Pyke feat. Katy Steele	Punch in the Heart	2011	Two Continuous Shots Playing Simultaneously In E Flat Minor
Knifeworld	In A Foreign Way	2011	
Nerina Pallot	Put Your Hands Up	2011	
Robyn	Call Your Girlfriend	2011	
Air Dubai feat. Patricia Lynn	Warning"	2012	
Dappy	Good Intentions	2012	
Jessie Ware	Wildest Moments	2012	
McFly	Love Is Easy	2012	
The Mowgli's	San Francisco	2012	
Nogizaka46	Gūzen o Iiwake ni Shite	2012	
The Pierces	I Put Your Records On	2012	
Scissor Sisters	Let's Have a Kiki	2012	
Taylor Swift	We Are Never Ever Getting Back Together	2012	
Brendan Maclean	Stupid	2013	
Brendan Maclean	Winner	2013	
Chris Brown	Fine China	2013	One Take version
EXO	Growl	2013	
G-Eazy	Been On	2013	
IU	Friday	2013	
LiLi Roquelin	The Only One	2013	
Lorde	Tennis Court	2013	
Mel B	For Once in My Life	2013	
Miley Cyrus	Wrecking Ball	2013	Director's Cut version
Panic! at the Disco	Girls / Girls / Boys	2013	
Pharrell Williams	Happy	2013	All versions except official edit
Phosphorescent	Song for Zula	2013	
Pusha T	Nosetalgia	2013	
Sam Tsui	Make It Up"	2013	
Skating Polly	Blue Obvious	2013	
Sam Smith	Lay Me Down	2013	Re-released In 2015
Violent Soho	Covered in Chrome	2013	
Bush	The Only Way Out	2014	
clipping.	Work Work	2014	
FKA twigs	Two Weeks	2014	
Jane Zhang	我是我的 (I Am Mine)	2014	
Kaiser Chiefs	Coming Home	2014	
Kiesza	Hideaway	2014	
Klangkarussell	All Eyes On You	2014	
Lights	Up We Go	2014	
Meg Mac	Roll Up Your Sleeves	2014	Australian Version
Metronomy	Love Letters	2014	
OK Go	I Won't Let You Down	2014	
OK Go	The Writing's on the Wall	2014	
Sia	Chandelier	2014	Alternative version
Super Junior	This Is Love	2014	
TVXQ	Spellbound	2014	
Violent Soho	Saramona Said	2014	
Wankelmut feat. John Lamonica	Wasted So Much Time	2014	
"Weird Al" Yankovic	Tacky	2014	
Wiz Khalifa	We Dem Boyz	2014	
5'nizza	I Believe in You	2015	
AURORA	Murder Song (5, 4, 3, 2, 1)	2015	
Avicii	Waiting for Love	2015	360 Version
Between the Buried and Me	The Coma Machine	2015	
Dil Dhadakne Do	Gallan Goodiyaan	2015	
The Dodos	Competition	2015	
Gwen Stefani	Used to Love You	2015	
Highly Suspect	Lydia	2015	
Jess Glynne	Take Me Home	2015	One Take Version
Julien Baker	Sprained Ankle	2015	
Marian Hill	One Time	2015	
MIKA	Last Party	2015	Black And White Version
Olly Murs	Seasons	2015	
Skepta	Nasty	2015	
The Social Experiment	Sunday Candy	2015	
Avatar	The Eagle Has Landed	2016	
BTS	Save Me	2016	
The Chemical Brothers feat. Beck	Wide Open	2016	
Dusky feat. Solomon Grey	Long Wait	2016	Directed by Noel Paul
FEMM	Whiplash	2016	
Mike Posner	I Took a Pill in Ibiza	2016	Original version
Mischief Brew	Squatter Envy	2016	
NAVI	Historyja majho žyccia	2016	
Samra	Miracle	2016	
Tove Lo	True Disaster	2016	
Arcade Fire	Creature Comfort	2017	
Bleachers	I Miss Those Days	2017	
Bruno Mars	That's What I Like	2017	
Cavetown	Lemon Boy	2017	
Danielle Bregoli	These Heaux	2017	
Eamon	I Got Soul	2017	
Fozzy	Judas	2017	Based on Guns N' Roses' "Garden of Eden"
Fozzy	Painless	2017	
Gotch	Taxi Driver	2017	
Haim	Want You Back	2017	
LANY	Super Far	2017	
Lauv	Paris in the Rain	2017	
Liam Payne feat. Quavo	Strip That Down (Dance Video)	2017	
Lorie	La vie est belle	2017	
Mondo Grosso feat. Hikari Mitsushima	Labyrinth	2017	
Orelsan	Basique	2017	
Sabrina Carpenter	Thumbs	2017	
Selena Gomez feat. Gucci Mane	Fetish (Audio Video)	2017	
Snakehips feat. MØ	Don't Leave (Lyric Video)	2017	
SOPHIE	It's Okay to Cry	2017	
Superfruit	How Ya Feeling	2017	
YouthK Saeki	ナウオアネバー (Now or Never)	2017	Shot entirely in reverse, evidently by passing traffic.
Benny Blanco & Calvin Harris	I Found You	2018	
Betty Who	Ignore Me	2018	
Billie Eilish	when the party's over	2018	
Cobi	Church of the Lonely	2018	
Death Valley Girls	Disaster (Is What We're After)	2018	Starring Iggy Pop
Gesu no Kiwami Otome	Onna wa Kawaru	2018	
Halsey	Sorry	2018	
In Flames	I Am Above	2018	
Justin Timberlake feat. Chris Stapleton	Say Something	2018	
Kyary Pamyu Pamyu	Kimino Mikata	2018	
Malú	Ciudad de Papel	2018	
Maroon 5 & Cardi B	Girls Like You	2018	Includes cameo from Ellen DeGeneres
Męskie Granie	Początek	2018	
Mojo Juju	Native Tongue	2018	
Poolside	Feel Alright Nashville	2018	
STU48	Kaze wo Matsu	2018	
Toro y Moi	Ordinary Pleasure	2018	Directed by Mancy Gant
Benny blanco, Tainy, Selena Gomez, J Balvin	I Can't Get Enough	2019	
Birds of Tokyo	Good Lord	2019	
Bleached	Shitty Ballet	2019	
Daisy the Great	I'm Fine	2019	
Example	All Night	2019	
Gesu no Kiwami Otome	Dakedo Boku wa	2019	
Hinatazaka46	"Konna ni Suki ni Natchatte Ii no?"	2019	"Hit prayer" version only
Jackson Wang	Dway!	2019	
Jessica Mauboy	Little Things	2019	
Karen O & Danger Mouse	Woman	2019	Directed by Spike Jonze; live on The Late Show with Stephen Colbert
LANY	Thick and Thin	2019	
Maroon 5	Memories	2019	
Naif & Indra Lesmana	Selama Ada Cinta	2019	Directed by Budi Cuprit, recorded in 2016
Nightly	Twenty Something	2019	
Scarlxrd	GXLD	2019	
Steam Powered Giraffe	Hot on the Trail	2019	
The Weeknd	Heartless	2019	Live on The Late Show with Stephen Colbert
Against the Current	That Won't Save Us	2020	
Cher Lloyd	Lost	2020	
The Chicks	Sleep at Night	2020	
Dance Gavin Dance	Prisoner	2020	
Flor	Yellow	2020	Cover of Coldplay's song "Yellow", featuring MisterWives
Haim	Don't Wanna	2020	
Madysin Hatter	Nobody's Fault	2020	
Scarlxrd	CXLD BLXXDED	2020	
Shawn Mendes & Justin Bieber	Monster	2020	
Sia	Together	2020	
Victoria	Tears Getting Sober	2020	
Yelle	Je t'aime encore	2020	
Ashe & FINNEAS	Till Forever Falls Apart	2021	
Camilo	Pesadilla	2021	
Coldplay	Higher Power	2021	Official Audio // Extraterrestrial Transmission
FLOW	Dice	2021	1発撮りバージョン
Giring Ganesha	Tahan Dulu	2021	
Los Fastidios	Pour La Liberté	2021	Official Videoclip
sumika	Shake & Shake	2021	Directed by Gen Natsume
Abraham Mateo	Ahora Te Puedes Marchar	2022	
Amyl and the Sniffers	Maggot	2022	Live From Williamstown
Ashkan Khatibi & Qaziso ft. Amir Azimi	Migorizi	2022	Directed by Ashkan Khatibi & Amir Pakdel
Kelvin Wood & Autone featuring Amanda Wilson	Crush	2022	
Kendrick Lamar	The Heart Part 5	2022	Directed By Kendrick Lamar and Dave Free
Kendrick Lamar ft. Taylour Paige	We Cry Together	2022	Directed By Jake Schreier, Kendrick Lamar and Dave Free
Muna (band)	Kind of Girl	2022	Directed by Taylor James
Paulo Londra	Chance	2022	
Sea Girls	DNA	2022	
The Smashing Pumpkins	Beguiled	2022	
Tasman Keith	Love Too Soon	2022	
Tegan and Sara	Yellow	2022	
Behm	Sata vuotta	2023	Video reversed and slowed down to 0.5x speed after filming
Jason Mraz	I Feel Like Dancing	2023	

== Videos seemingly shot in one take ==
- John Fogerty – "The Old Man Down the Road", 1985

Contains several edits disguised by dissolves, particularly when the camera is pointing down at the ground and the dissolves are less noticeable due to motion blur.

- U2 – "Numb", 1993

The video was spliced together from two separate takes. The cut between the two happens when the camera turns away from the face of guitarist, and singer on this track, The Edge and the cut was hidden by having smoke blowing in from the side of the frame.

- Primus – "Mr. Krinkle", 1993

One shutter camera cut at 5:26 at the end of the video

- Jamiroquai – "Virtual Insanity", 1996

The video contains several cuts when the camera tilts down, transitioning into another shot when it tilts up again.

- Eagle-Eye Cherry – "Save Tonight", 1997

Several hidden cuts when Eagle-Eye Cherry changes the character he's portraying.

- U2 – "Sweetest Thing", 1998

In a Channel 4, documentary discussing the Greatest Pop Videos of all time, the director Kevin Godley revealed that it was filmed in 3 shots, each shot transition hidden by a lens flare.

- Kylie Minogue – "Love at First Sight", 2002

The video editing process is the same as "Virtual Insanity" by Jamiroquai.

- The Chemical Brothers – "Star Guitar", 2002

The music video, directed by Michel Gondry, features a seemingly continuous shot, but it includes footage taken at different times of the day, and is assembled from repeated sequences.

- Will Young – “Leave Right Now”, 2003

The video is seemingly one continuous shot, chaos ensues in an art gallery.

- The White Stripes – "Seven Nation Army", 2003

The video is one seemingly continuous shot through a kaleidoscopic tunnel of mirrored black, white and red triangles.

- Alanis Morissette – “Everything”, 2004

The video appears to be one shot but features several cuts where the camera pans upwards.

- Miley Cyrus – "Start All Over", 2007

At the end of the video it has four cuts.

- Khalil Fong – "紅豆 (Red Beans)", 2009

Hidden cuts during camera moves.

- MIKA – "Blame it on the Girls", 2009

Hidden cuts from swift camera movement.

- OK Go – "This Too Shall Pass", 2010 – Rube Goldberg Machine video

In interviews, band member Damian Kulash and visual designer Hector Alvarez both admit to a cut at 2:27 when the curtain opens.

- Brian McFadden Featuring Kevin Rudolf – Just Say So, 2010

The video was done in one shot and lip synced backwards to allow for McFadden to still be in sync while the video goes backwards.

- LCD Soundsystem – "Drunk Girls", 2010

The video is a long take until near the end, when a few cuts are introduced.

- Jessie J – "Who You Are", 2011

There are several cuts at the end of this video, starting at 3 minutes.

- Kanye West – "Mercy", 2012

The video is made of multiple long takes superimposed over one another.

- One Direction – "You & I", 2014

The video was actually stitched from multiple takes to create the illusion of a single, continuous shot.

- Sia – "Big Girls Cry", 2014

The video contains a black cut at 1:12.

- Ariana Grande – "One Last Time", 2015

The video contains multiple cuts, while the screen fades to black.

- Maroon 5 – "This Summer's Gonna Hurt like a Motherfucker", 2015

Co-director Travis Schneider stated in an interview that although the video was planned to be one shot, there is one cut in the video.

- Era Istrefi – "Bonbon", 2015

There are several cuts in the video, starting from 2:25 to the end.

- OK Go – "Upside Down & Inside Out", 2016

Though the video, involving the band using parabolic flight from reduced-gravity aircraft to simulate micro-gravity, is from one long 40-45 minute shot, periods when the band is not in micro-gravity were trimmed from the final product.

- OneRepublic – "Kids", 2016

There Are Some Few Cuts In This Video

And The Camara Moves At 0:36

- Jessie Reyez - "Figures", 2016

Couple Of Cuts Starting At 0:08

- OK Go – "The One Moment", 2016

The video drastically slows down playback of about 4.2 seconds of actions that take place in real-time. However, to capture the amount of action, the band had to use multiple high-speed cameras on the same mounted system, their respective footage stitched together to compose the final video.

- Jax Jones – "You Don't Know Me", 2017

The video contains cut at 1:35, also several cuts near the end of the video.

- Dua Lipa – "IDGAF", 2018

The video editing process is the same as "Virtual Insanity" by Jamiroquai and "Love at First Sight" by Kylie Minogue.

- George Ezra – "Shotgun", 2018

The video is one shot of George Ezra going round in circles.

- Tish – "Try to C", 2019

One Cut at 2:28.

- Sam Fischer – "This City", 2019

The video is one shot recorded In 2017, released January 18, 2018 (Re-released December 13, 2019)

- Birds of Tokyo – "Two of Us", 2020

One shutter camera cut at 0:02 in the beginning of the video

- AJR (band) – "Bang!", 2020

The camera moves forwards 3 times and has 9 cuts on this video

- Tame Impala – "Lost in Yesterday", 2020

One cut for each "loop" around the wedding reception.

- Billie Eilish – "Therefore I Am", 2020

The video contains a black cut at 2:01.

- Hinatazaka46 – "Kimi Shika Katan", 2021

Possible cuts when the camera is pointed at the ground.

| | |}

== See also ==
- Digital cinema – Use of digital projectors in cinemas
- Digital cinematography – Digital image capture for film
- List of films shot on digital video prior to 2012
- Still image film – Film technique
