= Weightlessness (film) =

- Directed by: Mehdi Fard Ghaderi
- Written by: Mehdi Fard Ghaderi
- Produced by: Morteza Shayesteh
- Release date: 2019
- Running time: 85 minutes
- Country: Iran

Weightlessness (Persian: بی وزنی - Bi Vazni). is a 2019 Iranian drama thriller film directed by Mehdi Fard Ghaderi and his second feature film after Immortality (2016).

The film is made using long takes and its story is inspired by magical realism literature.

== Plot ==
The morning after a wedding ceremony the groom disappears, not seen since the night before. The bride, the groom's mother, the groom’s sister, and his lover, who came to the wedding uninvited, are looking for the reason for his disappearance. The next day, the women begin blaming each other as their relationships are put to the test.

== Cast ==
- Amirali Danaei
- Bahareh Kian Afshar
- Tina Pakravan
- Nasim Adabi

== Reception ==
Weightlessness was screened at several international festivals and won several awards.

The film was released in Iranian cinemas for only a few days, after which it was stopped due to the outbreak of Corona and the closure of cinemas, and after a while it was released on online platforms.

== Awards & Nomination ==
Year	Festival	Country	Category	Result	Ref(s)
2019	North Carolina Film Awards	USA	Director’s Award	Won	
2020	Insolito International Film Festival	Peru	Best Film	Won	
2020	Love International Film Festival	USA	Best Film	Nominated	
2020	Sofia Menar International Film Festival	Bulgaria	Best Film	Nominated	
2020	Ischia International Film Festival	Italy	Best Film	Nominated	
2020	Salento International Film Festival	Italy	Best Film	Nominated	
2020	Athens Marathon International Film Festival	Greece	Honorable Mention	Won	
