= The Annoyed =

2023 Iranian drama film

- Directed by: Mehdi Fard Ghaderi
- Written by: Mehdi Fard Ghaderi
- Starring: Leila Zare Reza Behboodi Farokh Nemati
- Music by: Behzad Abdi
- Release date: 2023
- Running time: 85 minutes
- Country: Iran
- Language: Persian

The Annoyed (Persian: آزردگان) is a 2023 Iranian drama film written and directed by Mehdi Fard Ghaderi. The film focuses on three Iranian filmmakers who want to make a film about society's problems; women's rights and execution. The Annoyed was Ghaderi's third feature film after Immortality and Weightlessness.

The world premiere of The Annoyed was in the main competition of the 25th Shanghai International Film Festival. Also, the film premiered in North America at the St. Louis International Film Festival.

== Plot ==
Episodic film. It is the story of three directors who try to make a film about social problems such as violence against women and executions.

The director wants to emigrate, but learns that his actor is being executed, so he decides to make a film about the execution. The director wants to make a film about violence against women, but is opposed by her husband. An old director who is told by a doctor that he has cancer and wants to make the last film of his life.

Each of these filmmakers makes a different genre of film and belongs to a different generation.

== Cast ==
- Leila Zare
- Mohammad Amin
- Farokh Nemati
- Reza Behboodi
- Roya Javidnia
- Hedyie Azidhak

== Reception ==
The premiere of The Annoyed was at the Shanghai International Film Festival in China. After that, the film was shown in several international festivals including; St. Louis International Film Festival in the United States and the Kerala International Film Festival in India.

The Annoyed was screened in fifteen international film festivals and received awards in Tajikistan and Mexico.

== Awards and nominations ==
Year	Festival	Country	Category	Result	Ref(s)
2023	Shanghai International Film Festival	China	Golden Goblet Awards	Nominated	
2023	St. Louis International Film Festival	United States	Best Film	Nominated	
2023	Kerala International Film Festival	India	World Cinema	Nominated	
2023	Toji Somon International Film Festival	Tajikistan	Best Director	Won	
2023	Chichester International Film Festival	United Kingdom	Best Film	Nominated	
2023	Winchester International Film Festival	United Kingdom	Best Film	Nominated	
2023	Human Rights International Film Festival	Nepal	Best Film	Nominated	
2024	Sofia Menar International Film Festival	Bulgaria	Best Film	Nominated	
2024	International Labor Film Festival	Turkey	Best Film	Nominated	
2024	MICMXI International Film Festival	Mexico	Best Film	Nominated	
2024	Independent International Film Festival	Mexico	Best visionary ِDirector	Won	
2024	Independent International Film Festival	Cyprus	Best Film	Nominated	
