= Roaring Twenties (disambiguation) =

Roaring Twenties is a common reference to the social change and turmoil associated with the 1920s.

Roaring Twenties may also refer to:

- The Roaring Twenties, a 1939 American gangster drama film starring James Cagney and Humphrey Bogart
- The Roaring 20's (TV series), an American television show that aired 1960–1962
- Roaring 20's (film), a 2021 French film
- Roaring 20s (album), an album by Rizzle Kicks
- "Roaring 20s", a song by American band Panic! at the Disco from their album Pray For The Wicked
- "Roaring 20s", a song by American rapper Flo Milli
