= The Hyperboreans =

- Theatrical release poster
- Directed by: Cristóbal León; Joaquín Cociña
- Written by: Joaquín Cociña; Cristóbal León; Alejandra Moffat
- Produced by: Catalina Vergara
- Starring: Antonia Giesen
- Cinematography: Natalia Medina
- Edited by: Catalina Sandoval; Cristobal León; Joaquín Cociña; Paolo Caro Silva
- Music by: Valo Sonoro
- Production companies: Globo Rojo Producciones; León & Cociña Films; Diluvio
- Distributed by: Storyboard Media
- Release dates: May 16, 2024 (Cannes); November 26, 2024 (Chile)
- Running time: 62 minutes
- Country: Chile
- Language: Spanish

The Hyperboreans (Spanish: Los hiperbóreos) is a 2024 Chilean surrealist film co-written, co-edited and directed by Cristóbal León and Joaquín Cociña, combining stop-motion animation, puppetry and live-action footage. It premiered at the 77th Cannes Film Festival in May 2024.

Told through a woman's narration and visions, the film resurrects the controversial figure of Miguel Serrano—a Chilean writer known for his esoteric neo-Nazi beliefs—prompting reflection on his historical legacy.

Among the characters featured is Jaime Guzmán, a Chilean academic, senator, and politician. Guzmán previously appeared as a central figure in their short film Los huesos, portrayed in a kind of danse macabre. In The Hyperboreans, he returns as a creature from the underworld. Other characters include the aforementioned Miguel Serrano, depicted as a visionary poet, and former Chilean interior minister Andrés Chadwick, portrayed as a melancholic magic elf.

== Production ==
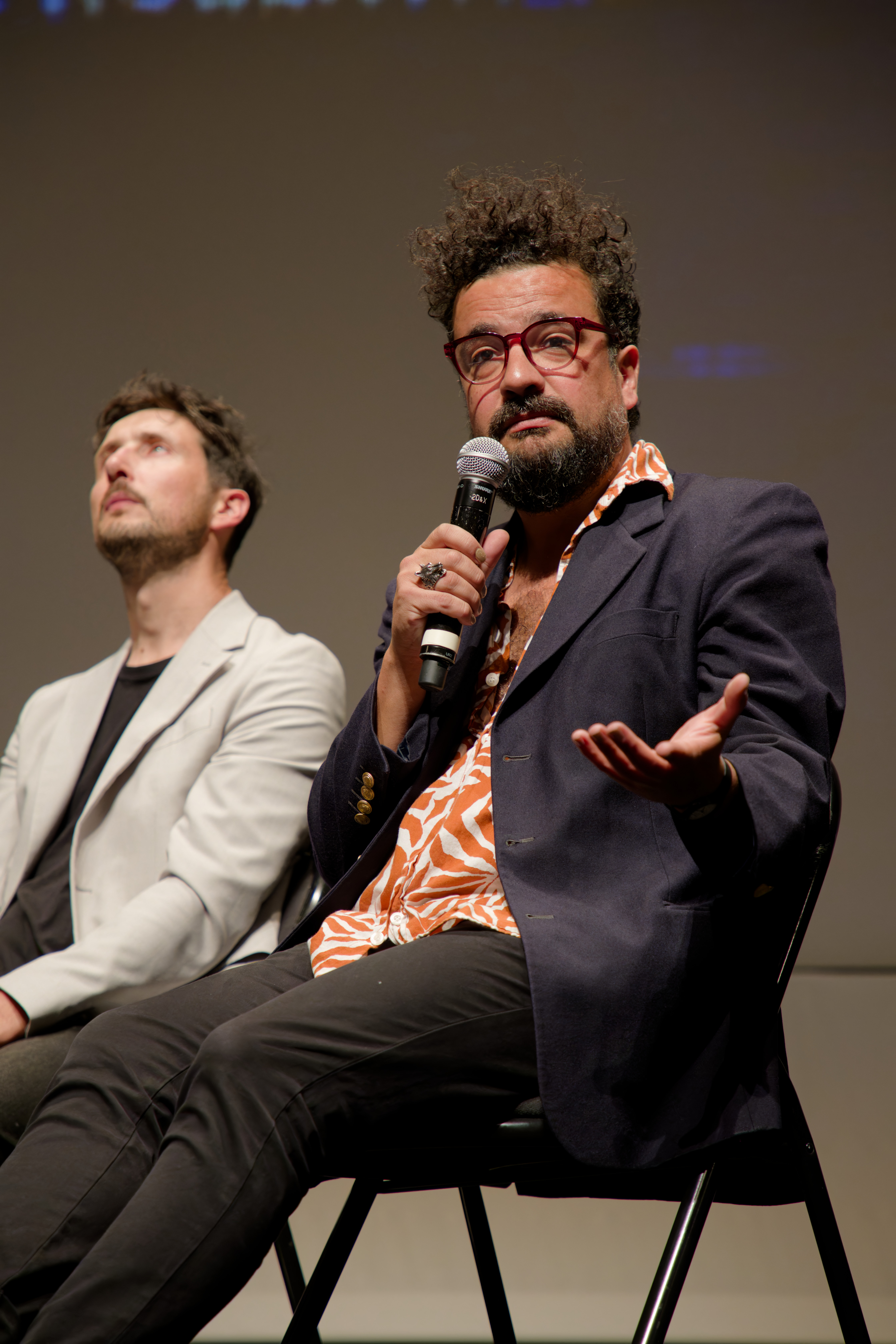
Joaquín Cociña at the Cannes Film Festival, May 2024

The film was directed by Cristóbal León and Joaquín Cociña. As with The Wolf House, their first feature-length collaboration, The Hyperboreans was conceived both as a film and as an art exhibition. In addition to drawings, the exhibition features sets and puppets from the film, offering visitors the chance to interact with the artists. The film combines puppetry, stop-motion animation, and live-action footage.

Principal photography for The Hyperboreans lasted two and a half weeks. The production involved around 30 people, including live-action actors Antonia Giesen and Francisco Visceral Rivera.

The film's score was composed by experimental musician Valo Sonoro.

== Release ==
The Hyperboreans had its world premiere on May 16, 2024, at the Cannes Film Festival, where it was screened in the Directors' Fortnight section. It was later shown at the Munich Film Festival in late June and early July 2024, at the Bucheon International Fantastic Film Festival in July, and at the Melbourne International Film Festival in August. In early October 2024, it was presented at the Sitges Film Festival, and in November at Camerimage. It is scheduled to be screened at the San Francisco International Film Festival in mid-to-late April 2025.

The film was released commercially on November 28, 2024, in Chilean theaters.

== Awards ==
- 77th annual Cannes Film Festival: Nominated in the Quinzaine des cinéastes section (Cristóbal León and Joaquín Cociña)
- Thessaloniki International Film Festival 2024: Nominated in the Film Forward Competition
- Munich Film Festival 2024: Nominated in the CineRebels competition
- Sitges Film Festival 2024: Nominated in the official competition

== See also ==
- Cinema of Chile
- Arthouse animation
