= My Name Is Mud =

1993 promotional single by Primus

Promotional single by Primus

from the album Pork Soda
- Released: 1993
- Studio: Ultrasound (San Rafael, California)
- Genre: Funk metal
- Length: 4:46
- Label: Interscope
- Songwriters: Les Claypool; Larry LaLonde; Tim Alexander
- Producer: Primus

Primus singles chronology
"Making Plans for Nigel" (1992)	"My Name Is Mud" (1993)	"DMV" (1993)

Music video
- "My Name Is Mud" on YouTube

"My Name Is Mud" is a song by the American rock band Primus. It was released as a promotional single from their third studio album, Pork Soda (1993). In 2010, Primus released a new version of the song sung entirely in Spanish under the title "Me Llamo Mud".

== Composition and recording ==
In the book Primus: Over the Electric Grapevine, when discussing "My Name Is Mud", bassist Les Claypool explained that "the whole notion of the ... song is basically about a couple of tweekers"—one of whom is the titular Mud—"who are hanging out, and they get in a fight over something stupid, and one of them kills the other one. Kind of a River's Edge–type vibe."

"My Name Is Mud" (like the rest of Pork Soda) was recorded in the band's rehearsal space, which was a series of UltraSound Audio-owned warehouses located in San Rafael. According to Claypool: "We ended up taking over three [of UltraSound's] spaces—we stuck [guitarist Larry LaLonde] in one, [drummer Tim Alexander] in one, and me in another. And we set up video cameras, so we could see each other. And we tracked Pork Soda through a Gamble console, which is our live console, onto [Alesis Digital Audio Tape (ADAT)]. It was one of the first ADAT records." "My Name Is Mud" was produced by the band themselves.

== Music video ==
The music video for "My Name Is Mud" was directed by Mark Kohr (who also helmed the videos for two other Primus songs: "DMV" and "Mr. Krinkle"). According to Les Claypool, the video is composed of three distinct visual threads: The first is the band performing the song in silhouette. The second is Claypool, in character as Aloysius Devadander Abercrombie or Mud, burying a dead body while spitting chewing tobacco and singing; at one point, he strikes the camera with a baseball bat and cracks the lens. The third is set in a spa "where ... beauty is voluptuous. Where big people are beauty, and skinny people are not." According to Claypool, the video is partly an homage to Sam Raimi's work.

The outdoor scenes were filmed around the Palo Alto area, near Interstate 280. During the first day of shooting, the band was caught in a massive rainstorm. "We ended up having to actually bag it," Claypool later noted, "which was a big deal ... scrapping the day almost killed the entire thing. It was freezing-ass cold, and the generator kept dying because somebody put diesel into a gas generator." Larry LaLonde noted something similar: "I remember it being super cold and raining [when we filmed the outdoor scenes]—just standing on the field, freezing to death. That was a tough one to make. It was pretty uncomfortable." The mud bath scenes were shot in Calistoga, California, and the graphic designer and musician Bob C. Cock (who also appears in the music video for "Jerry Was a Race Car Driver") cameos in this portion of the video, where he drinks soda containing the pig head from the album cover.

== Woodstock '94 performance ==
During Primus's Woodstock '94 performance of "My Name Is Mud", the band was pelted with mud, which band drummer Tim Alexander noted was done "not in a mean way, but kind of a rock 'n' roll way." About a minute into the song, the band stopped playing and Les Claypool told the crowd, "[Boy], I opened a big-ass can of worms with that one, didn't I? The song is called 'My Name Is Mud', but keep the mud to yourselves, you son-of-a-bitch!" He also told them that throwing mud was a "sign of small and insignificant genitalia". At that point "we got them to stop," Claypool explained in a 2014 interview with Greg Prato, "and we were able to continue and do our show." In the same interview, Claypool joked that he "still [has] mud in those speaker cabinets."

== Track listing ==
1. "Pork Chop's Little Ditty" – 0:21
2. "My Name Is Mud" – 4:46

== Personnel ==
- Les Claypool – vocals, bass guitar
- Larry LaLonde – guitar
- Tim Alexander – drums

== "Me Llamo Mud" ==
"Me Llamo Mud"

Single by Primus
- Released: November 30, 2010
- Genre: Alternative rock
- Label: Prawn Song

Primus singles chronology
"N.I.B." (2000)	"Me Llamo Mud" (2010)	"Tragedy's a' Comin'" (2011)

=== Personnel ===
- Les Claypool – vocals, bass
- Larry LaLonde – guitar
- Jay Lane – drums

== Charts ==
Chart (1993)	Peak position
US Alternative Airplay (Billboard)	9
