= DMV (song) =

Single by Primus

from the album Pork Soda
- Released: 1993
- Recorded: Winter 1992
- Length: 4:58
- Label: Interscope
- Songwriters: Les Claypool; Larry LaLonde; Tim Alexander
- Producer: Primus

Primus singles chronology
"My Name Is Mud" (1993)	"DMV" (1993)	"Mr. Krinkle" (1993)

"DMV" is a song by the American rock band Primus. It was released as the second single from their third studio album, Pork Soda (1993).

This song is also featured in Animals Should Not Try to Act Like People and in the compilation album They Can't All Be Zingers.

== Description ==
This song features bassist Les Claypool soulfully slapping and tapping his bass. In the video about 40 seconds of the outro were removed. It appears to be about the pointlessness of mundane activities such as waiting in line at Department of Motor Vehicles, going to the dentist and sitting on cold toilet seats etc., and seeking relief through marijuana. The lyrics reference the previous album Sailing the Seas of Cheese. The song has elements of art rock, funk, noise rock, and progressive metal.

== Music video ==
The video for "DMV" features live and backstage footage from the 10/1/1993 show at the Greek Theater in Berkeley, CA and clips from a toilet, animation and artwork used for the "Tommy the Cat" video. Due to the length of the song the video was cut to 4:29.

== Personnel ==
- Les Claypool – vocals, bass
- Larry LaLonde – guitar
- Tim Alexander – drums, percussion

== See also ==
- Primus discography
