= Cristobal León & Joaquín Cociña =

Chilean animators and filmmakers

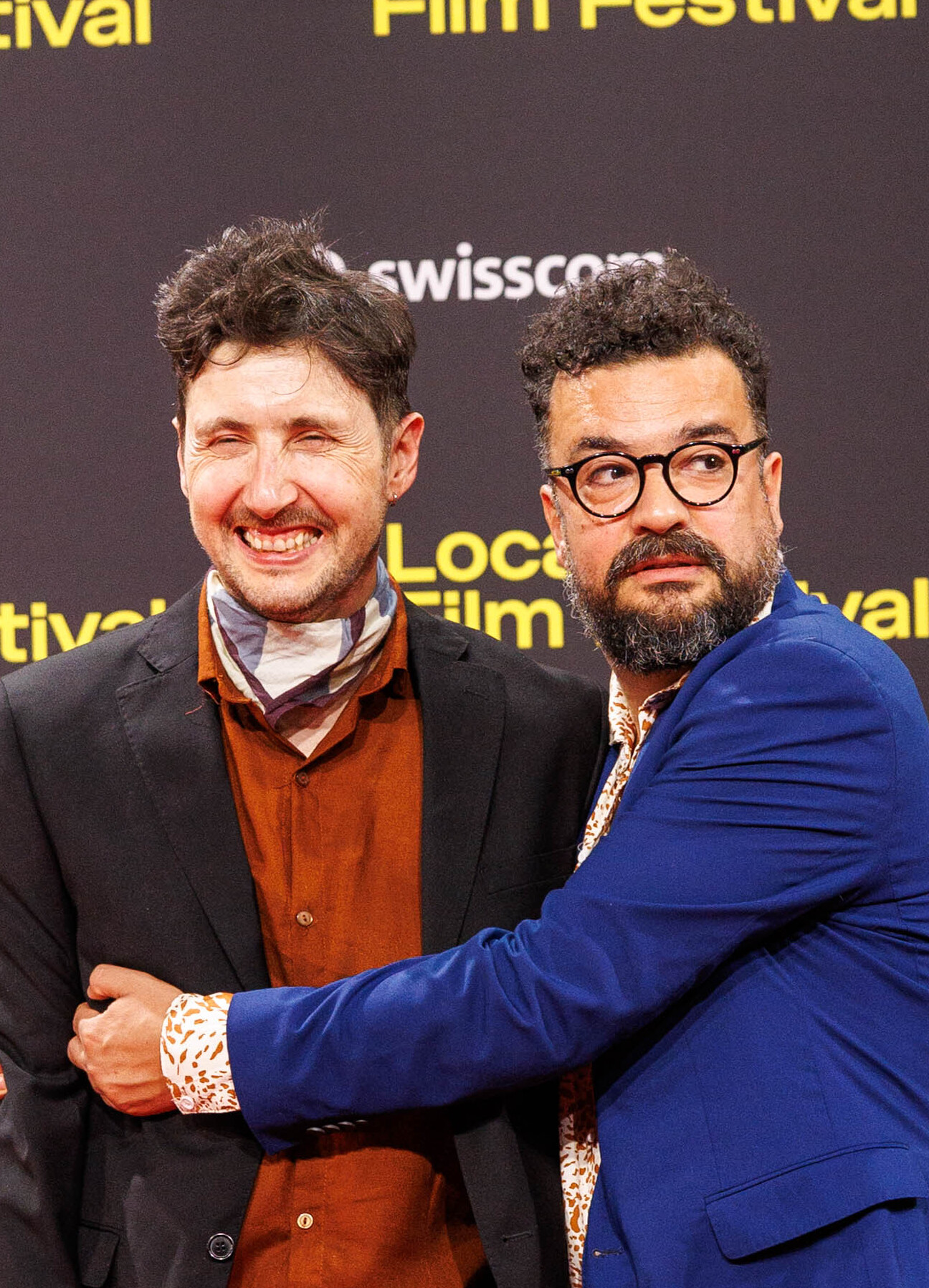
León and Cociña in 2026

Cristóbal León (Chile, 1980) and Joaquín Cociña (Chile, 1980) are Chilean stop-motion animators and filmmaker duo. They live and work in Santiago de Chile, and have been working together since 2007. Independent of each other, they make drawings, animations, installations as well as backdrops and they also write texts. Their work often finds direct or indirect inspiration in children's literature, using and resituating their narratives and visual aesthetics. In 2018, they premiered their first feature fiction film, The Wolf House (La casa lobo).

== Biography ==
Cristobal León was born to Víctor León and Eileen Dooner on November 22, 1980. He finished his bachelor's degree in design at the Universidad Católica de Chile, obtained a grant from the DAAD in 2007 and left for Berlin for a one-year programme at the UdK in 2009. In 2011 Leon became a participant artist at ‘The Ateliers’ in Amsterdam. He is also the brother of Alejandro León, architect and occasional artist.

Joaquín Cociña was born to Loreto Varas and Carlos Cociña on March 18, 1980. He obtained his bachelor's degree in fine arts at the Universidad Católica de Chile. He participated in various exhibitions in Chile and abroad, and also worked as a writer, illustrator and a backdrop designer for the theatre.

In many projects León and Cociña work together with the filmmaker Nilles Atallah (California, 1978), sharing roles in the production and post-production of their film-animations. They all three act as the directors, screenwriters, cartoonists, photographers and editors. By combining drawing, sculpture and stop-motion techniques they have created a corpus of art pieces that contribute with their own language to cinematic expression and thinking.

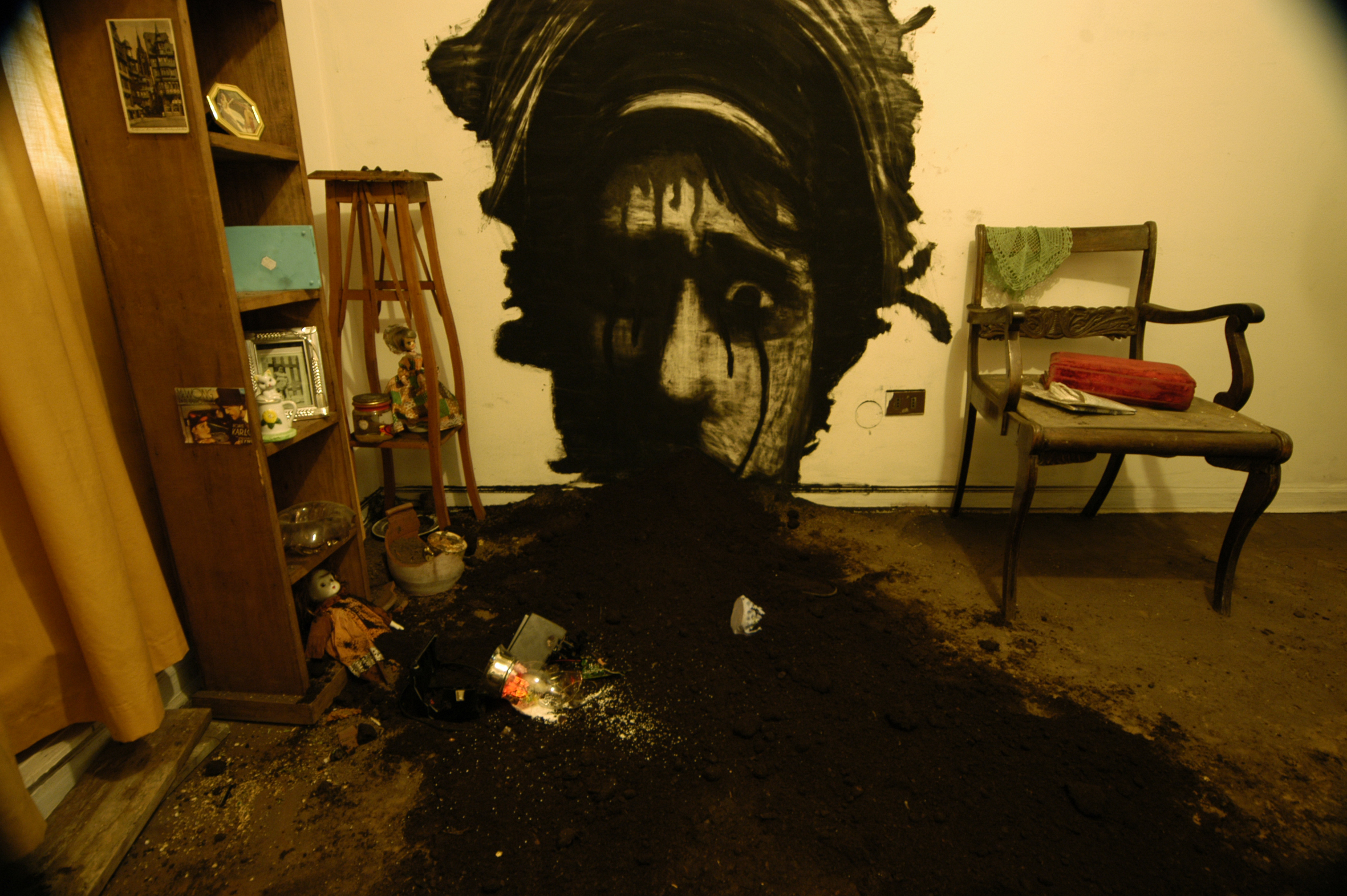
Lucia 2007

== Career ==
Lucía (2007) and Luis (2008) are two experimental video-animations, which operate as a diptych in motion. They were produced taking photographs of a sequence of drawings made on the walls of a room and the transformations of the things in this place. The two videos are the two sides of a love story expressed in passing, inconclusive thoughts. The title of the 2-part series is “Lucía, Luis y el lobo” (”Lucía, Luis and the Wolf”).

Der Kleinere Raum is a Stop-Motion video in which a young boy is trapped in a cardboard box. “In a room there is a box. In the box there is a forest. In the forest there is a lost child.” The film is clearly inspired on fairy tale aesthetics but has a claustrophobic and foreboding atmosphere. The film registers the apparition, deapparition and transformation of figures made out of newspaper and masking tape. It is made in collaboration with Nina Wehrle (illustrator).

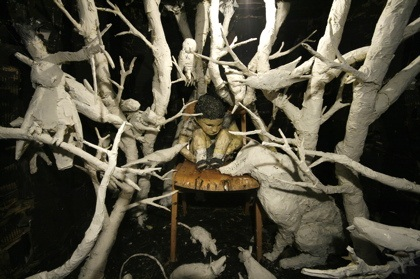
Der Kleinere Raum, 2009

In 2010 Cociña and León made El Arca, El Templo and Padre. Madre. The three films combine the naivety and playfulness of papier-mâché, manufactured costumes and stop-motion with the reality of the human body with its low malleability. Heavy themes such as the ritual, sex and death effortlessly shade off into innocence, intimacy or banality. The videos pull the viewer along into a current of strong associative images, successive scenes from a mythic narrative that never really takes on its definitive shape. These recent works are considerably rawer, more intuitive and disquieting than previous work such as the fairy-tale like Lucía and Luis.

In 2010 their work Luis was selected in the final top 25 shortlist of the YouTube Play Biennial of the Guggenheim Museum (New York). Also they have been awarded with the Asifa Austria Award for the films Luis and Lucía at the 7th edition of the Vienna Independent Shorts, the international short film festival. And their work was on show at the Kunst-Werke Institute for Contemporary Art in Berlin in the show ‘Highlights from the Cologne Kunstfilm Biennale.

The short film El Arca is selected for the Tiger Awards Competition for Short Films 2012. Nine short films in this competition will see their world premieres at the International Film Festival Rotterdam which will take place from 25 January to 5 February 2012. The winning filmmakers will be announced on 30 January.

Their first feature fiction film, La Casa Lobo (The Wolf House), is a stop-motion film that premiered at the 68th Berlinale Film Festival in Berlin, in February 2018. It participated in the section Forum, obtaining the Calgari Film Prize. Since its release, the film has received a number of awards and has been screened in several festivals, including the Annecy International Animated Film Festival, Cartagena Film Festival, San Sebastián International Film Festival and the Festival Internacional de Cine de Valdivia, among others. The film was shot during more than five years in a dozen of locations, including museums and galleries in various countries in Latin America and Europe.

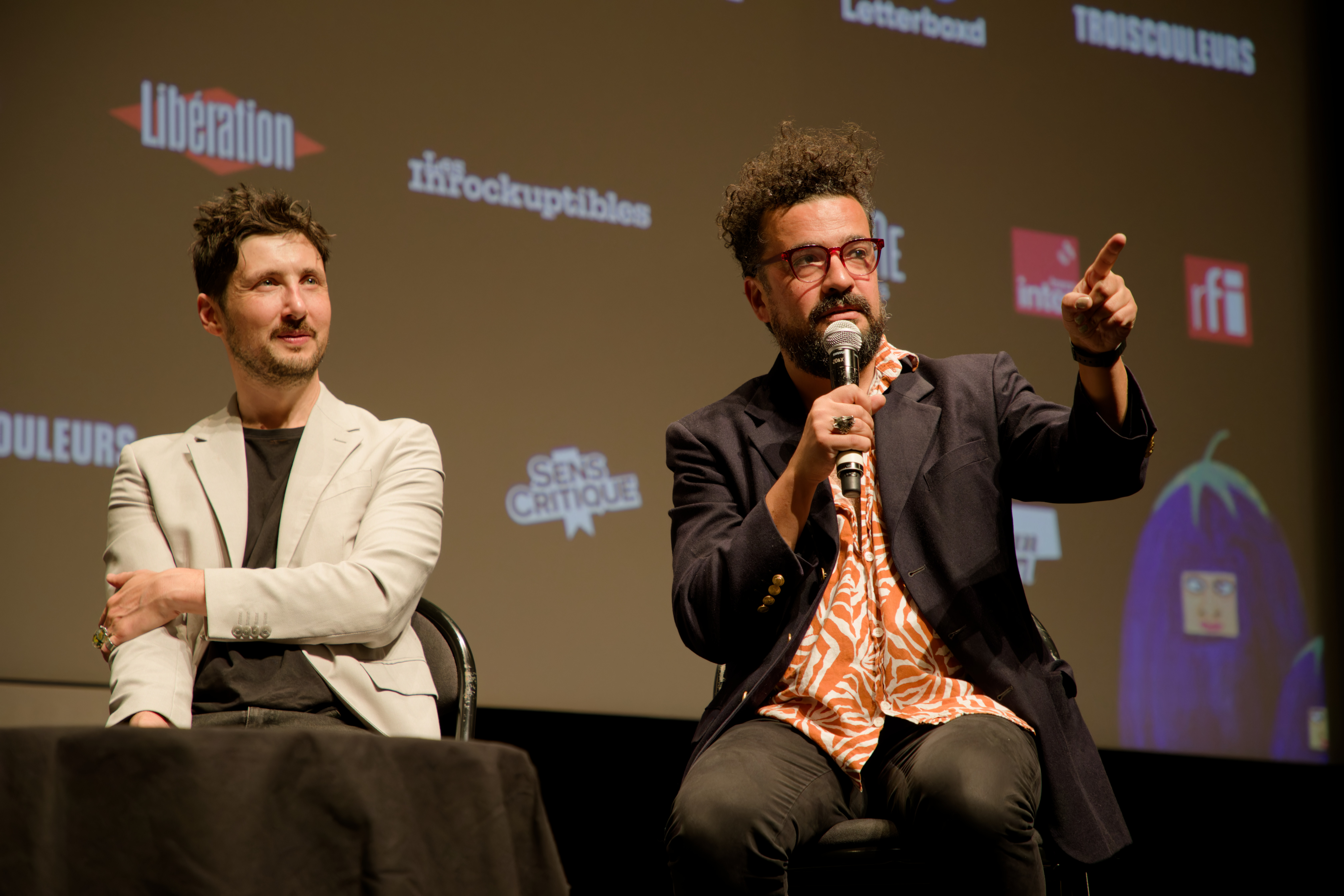
León and Cociña at the 2024 Cannes Film Festival

They directed the music video for the song "Thin Thing" by Radiohead side-project The Smile off of their debut album "A Light for Attracting Attention" (2022).

== Filmography ==
=== Short films ===
- Lucia (2007)
- Night of Chile (2008)
- Luis (2008)
- Der Kleinere Raum (2009) - only León, with Nina Wehrle
- Weathervane (2010) - Cociña only
- Father. Mother. (2011)
- The Ark (2011)
- The Bruja and the Lover (2012)
- Los Andes (2013)
- Extrañas criaturas (2019) - only León, with Cristina Sitja Rubio
- Los Huesos (2021)

=== Feature films ===
- The Wolf House (La casa lobo) - 2018
- Beau Is Afraid - 2023 (animators only)
- The Hyperboreans (Los hiperbóreos) - 2024
- Donkey Princess (Princesa Burro) - 2026

=== Music videos ===
- "Black Cat" - Your New Friends (2013)
- "Te quise" – Camila Moreno (2013)
- "Peak" - Diego Lorenizi (2014)
- "Por el Bien de Todos" - Los VariosArtistas (2014)
- "Reggaeton Nº 2 en La menor" - Acólitos Encubiertos (ft. Diego Lorenzini) (2014)
- "Libres y estupidos" – Camila Moreno (2015)
- "Sin mí" – Camila Moreno (2015)
- "Thin Thing" – The Smile (2022)
- "I Inside the Old Year Dying" – PJ Harvey (2023)

== Awards ==
The film Lucia has won the following awards:

2010

- Asifa Austria Award, International Competition Animation Avantgarde, Vienna Independent Shorts International Film Festival, Vienna, Austria.
- Grand Jury Prize, Disposable Film Festival, San Francisco, California, USA.

2009

- Grand Prix Woodenwolf Prize, Animated Dreams, Animation Film Festival, Tallinn, Estonia.
- 1st Prize, Best International Film, Fantoche International Animation Film Festival, Baden, Switzerland.
- Grand Jury Prize For Best Short Film, Ibero-American Festival of Short films ABC (FIBABC), Madrid, Spain.
- Special Mention Jury Prize, 16º Valdivia International Film Festival, Valdivia, Chile.

2008

- Literaturwerkstatt Berlin Prize, Zebra Poetry Film Festival, Berlin, Germany.
- 2nd Place Award, Fair Play Film and Video Award Festival, Lugano, Switzerland.

The film Luis has won the following awards and grants:

2010

- Asifa Austria Award, International Competition Animation Avantgarde, Vienna Independent Shorts International Film Festival, Vienna, Austria.
- Special Award, Animafest Zagreb 2010 World Festival of Animated Film, Zagreb, Croatia.

2007

- FONDART (National Grant for Arts and Culture) from the Chilean government for the development of the video.
