= Mehdi Fard Ghaderi =

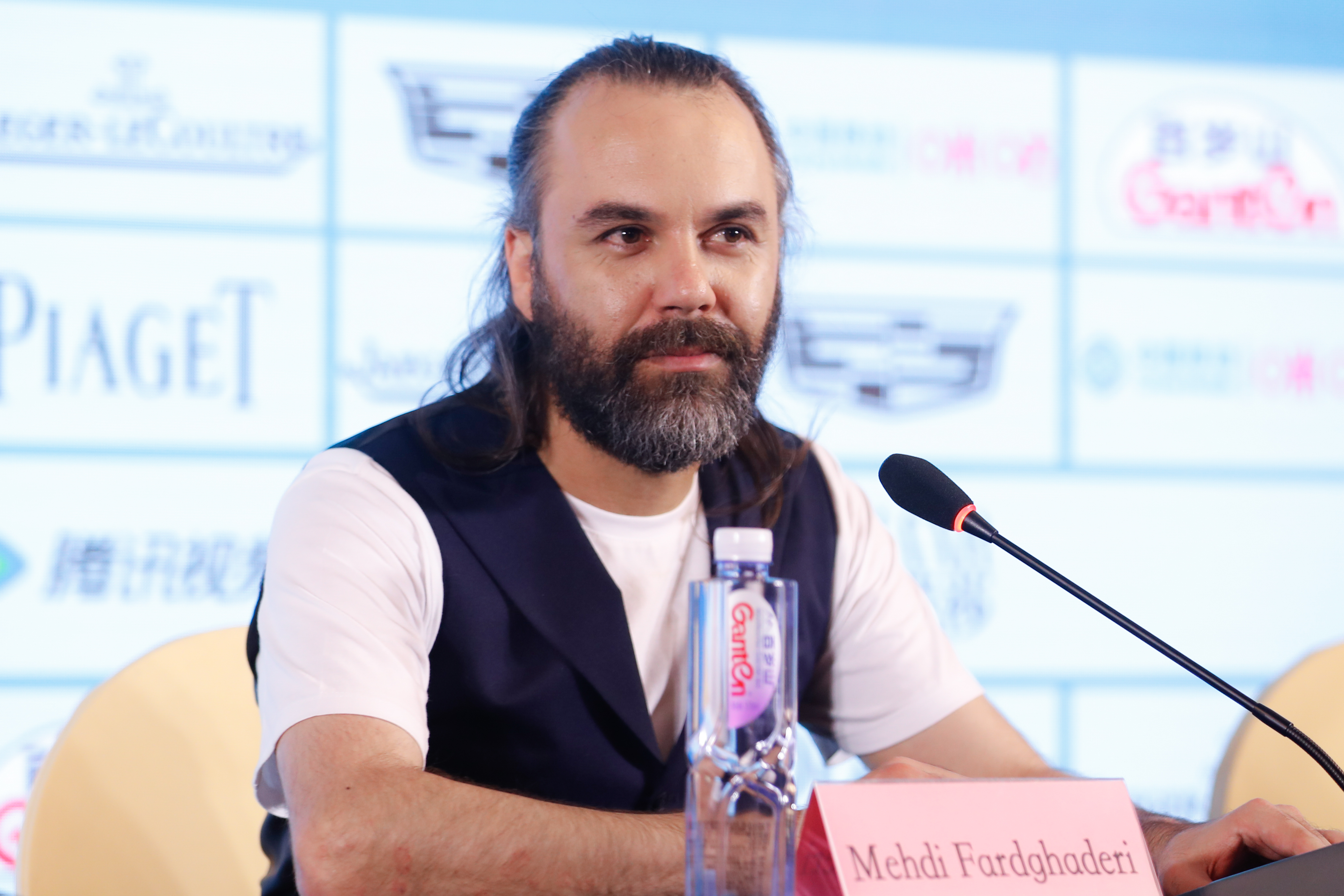
- Fard Ghaderi at the Shanghai Festival
- Born: 1986 (age 39–40); Iran
- Occupations: Director; Screenwriter; Producer
- Years active: 2007–present
- Notable work: The Annoyed (2023); Weightlessness (2019); Immortality (2016)

Mehdi Fard Ghaderi (Persian: مهدی فرد قادری; born 1986) is an Iranian film director, screenwriter, and film producer. He is known for his use of single-shot cinematography and non-linear storytelling.

Immortality (2016) was his first feature film, filmed in One single-shot 145-minute. It premiered in the main competition section of the Rome Film Festival in Italy and was subsequently screened at the Munich Film Festival and the Transilvania Film Festival.

Weightlessness (2019) continued his exploration of long takes and unconventional narrative structures.

The Annoyed (2023) premiered in the competition section of the Shanghai International Film Festival in China. It was also screened at the St. Louis International Film Festival in the United States and International Film Festival of Kerala in India.

Phase Space (2027), is his fourth feature film, it was shot in Lanzarote Spain. A science fiction thriller film, it consists of four simultaneous continuous shots without cuts. The film produced by the Swiss company COMIGO, the film completed post-production in Paris, France.

Fard Ghaderi began his film making career at the age of eighteen at the Iranian Youth Cinema Society. Over the course of ten years, he directed ten narrative and experimental short films, including Alternation, Reverse Circles, and The Story of A Rainy Night. Three of these films were filmed in a single shot.

== Career ==
=== Feature films ===
Immortality (2016), his first feature film, was filmed in a single shot over 145 minutes aboard a train. The film receive nominated for Best Film at the Rome Film Festival, Munich Film Festival, and the Transilvania International Film Festival. It was screened at twenty international film festivals. The film won several international awards, including Best Film at the 16th Ischia Film Festival.

Weightlessness (2019), his second feature film, also employed extended long takes. The film was screened at fifteen international film festivals and received awards in Europe and North America.

The Annoyed (2023), premiered at the 25th Shanghai International Film Festival. The film was screened at 25 international film festivals, including the St. Louis Film Festival and the Kerala Film Festival.

Phase Space is a science fiction film composed of four simultaneous long takes, featuring no cuts whatsoever. Produced by the Swiss company Comigo Sa, it marks Mehdi Fard Ghaderi’s first feature film made outside of Iran. The film was shot on the island of Lanzarote, Spain, and its post-production was completed in Paris, France.

==== Short films ====
Fard Ghaderi began his career in cinema in 2007. Over the following decade, he wrote and directed eight experimental and narrative short films, including the following:

- Alternation (one shot, 11 minutes, 2007)
- The Life of Khorshid (18 minutes, 2009)
- Gramophone (18 minutes, 2010)
- Reversing Circles (one shot, 21 minutes, 2011)
- Mirror Narration of Simple Stories (27 minutes, 2013)
- The Story of a Rainy Night (one shot, 24 minutes, 2015)
- Autumn Leaves (15 minutes, 2017)
- Sinful Pleasures (15 minutes, 2019)

===== Producing =====
He served as a producer on the film The Son (2021). The film received awards at the Moscow Film Festival and was screened at the International Film Festival Rotterdam and the Valladolid International Film Festival.

== Other roles ==
Mehdi Fard Ghaderi served as a jury member at several international film festivals in the United States, Italy, Czech Republic, Russia, Kazakhstan, Tajikistan, and Iran.

== Filmography ==
=== Feature films ===
Year	Title	Director	Writer	Producer
2016	Immortality	Yes	Yes	No
2019	Weightlessness	Yes	Yes	No
2023	The Annoyed	Yes	Yes	Yes
2027	Phase Space	Yes	Yes	No

=== Short films ===
Year	Title	Director	Writer	Producer
2007	Alternation	Yes	Yes	No
2009	The Life of Khorshid	Yes	Yes	Yes
2010	Gramophone	Yes	Yes	Yes
2011	Reversing circles	Yes	Yes	No
2013	Mirror Narration of Simple Stories	Yes	Yes	Yes
2015	The Story of a Rainy Night	Yes	Yes	No
2017	Autumn leaves	Yes	Yes	No
2019	Sinful Pleasures	Yes	Yes	No

== Jury ==
Position	Festival	Country	Year	Ref
Chairman of the Jury	Eurasia International Festival	Russia	2022	
Jury member	Utah Art International Film Festival	United States	2024	
Jury member	Ischia International Film Festival	Italy	2018	
Jury member	Brno Sixteen International Film Festival	Czech Republic	2016	
Jury member	VGIK Student International Film Festival	Russia	2024	
Jury member	Bausa International Film Festival	Kazakhstan	2022	
Jury member	Bogura International Film Festival	Bangladesh	2021	
Jury member	Toji Somon International Film Festival	Tajikistan	2023	

== Books ==
Title	Type	Genre	Year	Language
Man Whom No Woman Loved	Novel	Crime-Romance	2021	Persian

== Awards and nominations (Feature Movies) ==
Year	Festival	Country	Category	Nominated work	Result	Ref.
2016	Rome Film Festival	Italy	BNL People's Choice Award	Immortality	Nominated	
2017	Munich Film Festival	Germany	Best Film	Immortality	Nominated	
2017	Transilvania International Film Festival	Romania	Best Film	Immortality	Nominated	
2016	Hanoi International Film Festival	Vietnam	Best Director	Immortality	Nominated	
2017	Jogja-Netpac Asian Film Festival	Indonesia	World Cinema	Immortality	Nominated	
2017	One Take Film Festival	Croatia	Best One Single-Shot	Immortality	Nominated	
2017	Ischia International Film Festival	Italy	Best Film	Immortality	Won	
2017	Love International Film Festival	USA	Best Director	Immortality	Nominated	
2017	Love International Film Festival	USA	Best Film	Immortality	Nominated	
2017	Lucania Film Festival	Italy	Best Film	Immortality	Nominated	
2017	Buffalo Dreams Fantastic Festival	USA	Best International Drama	Immortality	Won	
2017	Middlebury New Filmmakers Festival	USA	Best Film	Immortality	Nominated	
2017	Sofia Menar Film Festival	Bulgaria	Main competition	Immortality	Nominated	
2020	Insolito International Film Festival	Peru	Best Film	Weightlessness	Won	
2020	Buffalo Dreams Fantastic Film Festival	USA	Best Film	Weightlessness	Won	
2020	North Carolina Film Awards	USA	Directors Award	Weightlessness	Won	
2020	Athens Marathon International Film Festival	Greece	Honorable Mention	Weightlessness	Won	
2020	Ischia Film Festival	Italy	Best Film	Weightlessness	Nominated	
2020	Salento International Film Festival	Italy	Best Film	Weightlessness	Nominated	
2022	Moscow International Film Festival	Russia	Golden George	The Son	Nominated	
2022	Rotterdam International Film Festival	Netherlands	Light Award	The Son	Nominated	
2022	Minsk Film Festival Listapad	Belarus	Youth Competition	The Son	Nominated	
2022	Valladolid International Film Festival	Spain	Main Competition	The Son	Nominated	
2023	Shanghai International film festival	China	Golden Goblet Awards	The Annoyed	Nominated	
2023	St. Loui International film festival	USA	Main Competition	The Annoyed	Nominated	
2023	Kerala International Film Festival	India	World Cinema	The Annoyed	Nominated	
2023	Winchester film festival	UK	Main competition	The Annoyed	Nominated	
2023	Chichester film festival	UK	Main competition	The Annoyed	Nominated	
2023	Toji Somon International Film Festival	Tajikistan	Main competition	The Annoyed	Won	
2024	Ischia International Film Festival	Italy	Location competition	The Annoyed	Nominated	
2024	Lucania Film Festival	Italy	Main competition	The Annoyed	Nominated	
2024	Labor Film Festival	Turky	Main competition	The Annoyed	Nominated	
2024	Mexico Independent Festival	Mexico	Best Director	The Annoyed	Won	
2024	Green Point Film Festival	USA	Main competition	The Annoyed	Nominated	

== Awards and nominations (Short Films) ==
Year	Festival		Category	Nominated work	Result	Ref
2020	Mammoth Lakes Film Festival	USA	Main competition	Sinful Pleasure	Nominated	
2017	Detmold Film Festival	Germany	Main competition	Autumn Leaves	Nominated	
2016	Livermore Valley Film Festival	USA	Best Film	The Story Of A Rainy Night	Nominated	
2015	Anchorage Alaska Festival	USA	Honorable Mention	The Story Of A Rainy Night	Won	
2015	No Fear Film Festival	USA	Best of Show	The Story Of A Rainy Night	Won	
2015	North Carolina Film Awards	USA	Founder's Award	The Story Of A Rainy Night	Won	
2015	Riverside International Film Festival	USA	Best Film	The Story Of A Rainy Night	Nominated	
2015	Hell's Half Mile Festival	USA	Best Film	The Story Of A Rainy Night	Nominated	
2015	Harlem Film Festival	USA	Best Film	The Story Of A Rainy Night	Nominated	
2015	Con Festival Philadelphia	USA	Best Film	The Story Of A Rainy Night	Nominated	
2014	Colony Film Festival	USA	Best Film	The Story Of A Rainy Night	Won	
2014	San Pedro Film Festival	USA	Best Film	The Story Of A Rainy Night	Won	
2013	Hanover film festival	Germany	Main competition	Mirror Narration of Simple Stories	Nominated	
2010	One Take Film Festival	Croatia	Main competition	Reversing Circles	Nominated	
2010	Nations Film Festival	Austria	Main competition	Gramophone	Nominated	
2009	Tous Courts Film Festival	France	Main competition	The Life Of Khorshid	Nominated	
2009	Brno Sixteen Festival	Czech Republic	Special Mention	Alternation	Won	
2008	Hamburg Film Festival	Germany	Main competition	Alternation	Nominated	
2008	Metro Train Film Festival	France	Special Jury	Alternation	Won	
2007	Lausanne Underground Film Festival	Switzerland	Main competition	Alternation	Nominated	
2007	Fajr Film Festival	Iran	Short Film competition	Alternation	Nominated	
2007	Tehran Short Film Festival	Iran	Best Experimental Film	Alternation	Won	
