= Aragonese Castle =

Castle in the Gulf of Naples, Italy

- Castello Aragonese
- Italy
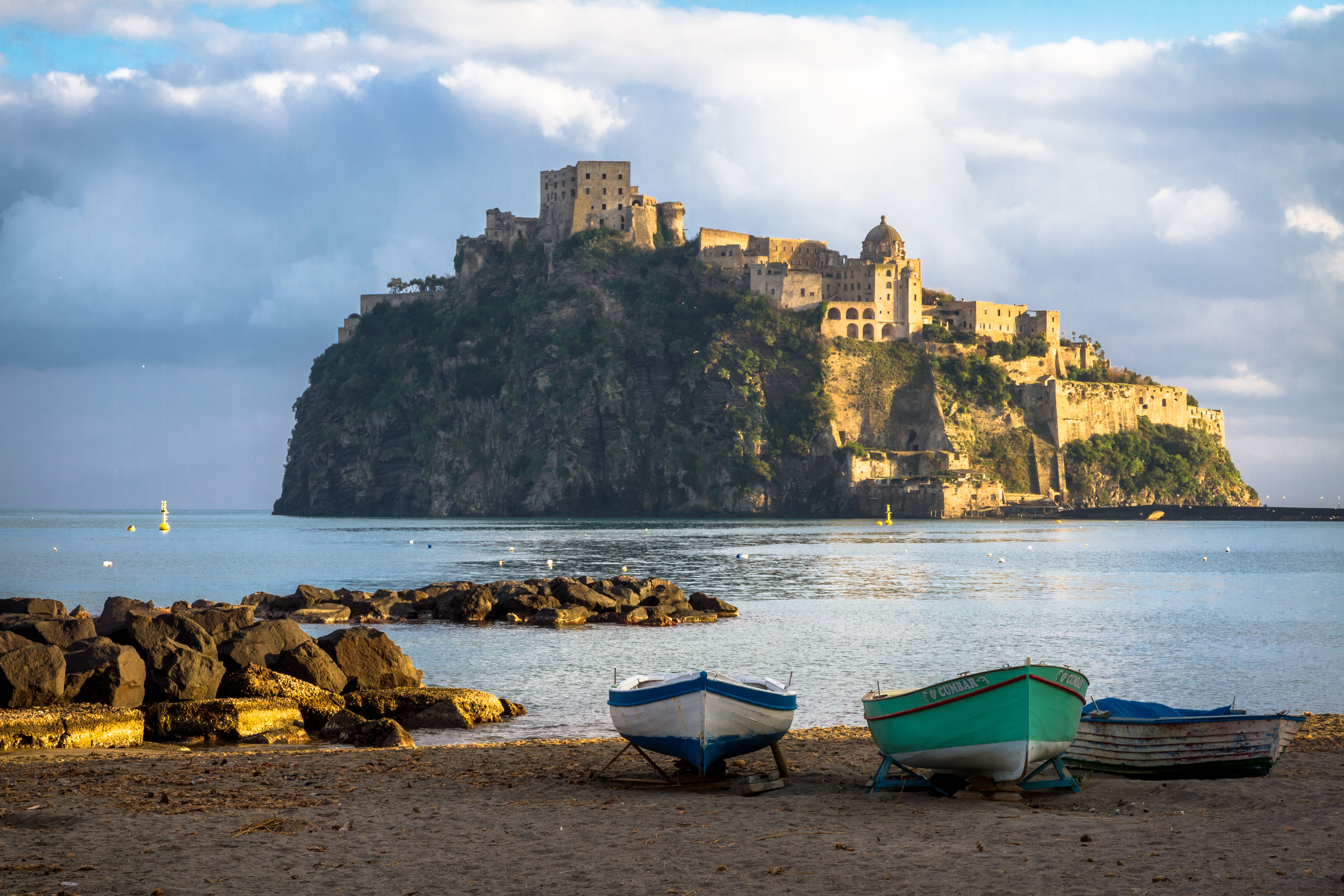
- Aragonese Castle

Location
- Coordinates: 40.7318°N 13.9647°E

Site history
- Materials: Limestone

Aragonese Castle (Italian: Castello Aragonese) is a castle built on a small tidal island east of Ischia (one of the Phlegraean Islands), at the northern end of the Gulf of Naples, Italy. The castle stands on a volcanic rocky islet that connects to the larger island of Ischia by a causeway (Ponte Aragonese).

== History ==
A first castle was built by Hiero I of Syracuse in 474 BC. At the same time, two towers were built to control enemy fleets' movements. The rock was then occupied by Parthenopeans, the ancient inhabitants of Naples. In 326 BC the fortress was captured by Romans, and then again by the Parthenopeans.

In 1441 Alfonso V of Aragon connected the rock to the island with a stone bridge in place of the prior wood bridge, and fortified the walls in order to defend the inhabitants against the raids of pirates.

Around 1700, about 2000 families lived on the islet, including a Poor Clares convent, an abbey of Basilian monks (of the Greek Orthodox Church), the bishop and the seminar, the prince with a military garrison. There were also 13 churches. In 1809, the British troops laid siege to the island, then under French command, and shelled it to almost complete destruction. In 1912, the castle was sold to a private owner. Today the castle is the most visited monument of the island.

== Location and description ==
The castle is built on a small tidal island east of Ischia (one of the Phlegraean Islands), at the northern end of the Gulf of Naples, Italy. The castle stands on a volcanic rocky islet that connects to the larger island of Ischia by a causeway (Ponte Aragonese).

It is accessed through a tunnel with large openings which let the light enter. Along the tunnel there is a small chapel consecrated to John Joseph of the Cross (Italian: San Giovan Giuseppe della Croce), the patron saint of the island. Outside the castle are the Church of the Immacolata and the Cathedral of Assunta. The first was built in 1737 on the location of a smaller chapel dedicated to Saint Francis, and closed after the suppression of Convents in 1806 as well as the nunnery of the Clarisses.

== Uses ==
Ischia Film Festival, an international film festival, is held in the castle each year from late June into early July.

== See also ==
- List of castles in Italy
