= Welcome to This World =

Song by Primus

from the album Pork Soda
- Released: 1993
- Length: 3:40
- Label: Interscope; Prawn Song
- Songwriter(s): Les Claypool, Larry LaLonde and Tim Alexander
- Producer(s): Primus

"Welcome to This World" is a song by the American rock band Primus, from their third studio album Pork Soda (1993).

== Live performances ==
It was once a longstanding rumor among fans of the band that they had never played the song live, due to it, at the time, not being listed on the site Toasterland, a website that covers setlists of the band as well as Claypool's side projects throughout the years. The song had been played as a tease in 1987 (before the song was recorded) and in 2003, however, a live version of the song played in its entirety hadn't made its way onto the internet until December 31, 2006, when a live recording of the song showed up on the internet from the band's performance at Lollapalooza 1993.

On New Year's Eve 2015, the band played the song for the first time in over twenty years as part of a Pork Soda full-album set in Oakland, CA. The song was later played as part of an encore during their Winter 2016 tour with Tool.

== Personnel ==
- Les Claypool – vocals, bass
- Larry LaLonde – guitar
- Tim "Herb" Alexander – drums

== In popular culture ==
The song appears on the soundtrack to the 1994 movie Brainscan. The song was also featured in the South Park episode "The Tooth Fairy's Tats 2000", along with the song "Pork Soda" from the same album.
