= LiLi Roquelin =

American singer-songwriter

- Roquelin in 2019

Background information
- Born: Toulon, French Riviera, France
- Origin: New York City, New York, US
- Genres: Indie pop, Adult contemporary, trip hop, alternative rock
- Occupation(s): Singer-songwriter, composer
- Instrument(s): Vocals, piano, ukulele
- Years active: 2006–present
- Website: www.liliroquelin.com

LiLi Roquelin is a French-American singer, songwriter, composer, record producer from Astoria, Queens, New York City. Roquelin is most notable for her songs which won Best Music Video at several film festivals and received TV and Film placements and for being featured in a New York Times article.

== Early life ==
Roquelin was born in Toulon, France, and grew up on The French Riviera (known in French as La Côte d'Azur), learning music at a very young age. She played several gigs as a teenager, both solo and in various bands. She then left France to pursue a career in the United States. She moved to the Cleveland-Akron area of Northeast Ohio, and fronted Phizzy Lager and then the alternative hard-rock Kent, Ohio band Hate Dies Hard, and released with them in 2006 an album entitled Neverending Sundown and engineered by Bill Korecky (Mushroomhead's Producer).

== Career ==
Roquelin was introduced to producer Sean Bilovecky (Disengage), who collaborated with her on "I Saw You". Later that year, Roquelin moved to New York City. The music video for "I Saw You" was included in her self-titled EP and won Best Music Video at the Queens (NY) International Film Festival in November 2008 and Best Music Video at the 2009 Indie Gathering Film Festival.

Roquelin recruited Marc Urselli to mix and master the recordings from her EP and launched an online crowdfunding campaign to help cover the expenses of the EP, a recording of down-tempo, trip hop songs composed by Roquelin with lyrics in English and French accompanied by her piano arrangements. "Blues Alone" received an Honorable Mention at the 2009 John Lennon Songwriting Contest.

Roquelin released a full-length album Will you hate the rest of the world or will you renew your life? and a music video for "Should You Get Mad" in February 2010. The video was directed by Arnaud Muller (U2) at RNO Pictures and was in the official selection of ZFF Film Festival (London, Miami, LA). It was runner-up in the Best Music Video in pop category at the 2010 Indie Gathering Film Festival and Convention. The album also includes a cover of Danny Elfman's "Sally's Song" (from Tim Burton's The Nightmare Before Christmas) in French.

Her music was listed as credit on the soundtrack of Attack of La Nina by Matchstick Productions.

LiLi Roquelin released an album, Beautiful Sun, in December 2012. On 31 January 2013 she premiered the music video for her song "Thank You". There is a mini-documentary on the making of "Beautiful Sun". Some of the musicians on the album are cellist Christopher Marion, guitarist and bassist Askold Buk (Hayley Westenra, Hugh Masekela). She composed and arranged all of the music on the album and recruited Grammy winning mixing engineer Marc Urselli and Roman Vail, mastering engineer at JLM Mastering Studios (Moby, Sinéad O'Connor, The Black Crowes).

On 21 November 2013 she premiered her new music video for "The Only One" at a Music & Film event that she presented. It is a one-shot music video where Roquelin walks down a path while various men appear around her. At the end of the video, the guy she runs into turns out to be 'The One'. It was directed by Kyle Lavore, who has worked on films The Amazing Spider-Man and Men in Black III. "The Only One" is track number 5 on album "Beautiful Sun", a Rock song with alternative guitars, inspired in part by her past Rock music experience.

On 2 May 2014 she performed as the opening act for Bruce Sudano (producer for Michael Jackson, Dolly Parton and his wife Donna Summer) at The Bitter End.

In December 2014 Roquelin released a new Music Video "Like a Feather" animated by Indie Venture. The video was shown at a private Music, Film and Animation event that she presented in New York City with support from Asifa-East (International Animated Film Association, East Coast Chapter). In March 2015, she released an indie-pop single entitled "Smile".

Four of Lili Roquelin’s songs were on Dance Moms (LifeTime TV); one of them was chosen for a Solo Number by dancer/actress Maddie Ziegler, who has performed in several videos by singer Sia Furler.

Her "Like a Feather" Music Video was in the official selection of several Film Festivals, it received a Nomination for Best Short Film at the Golden Door International Film Festival and won "Rising Star Award" at the 11th Canada International Film Festival in April 2016.

Roquelin released a new album "Be Inspired" on 6 December 2018, with a red-carpet event and live performance at The Bitter End in New York City with a band. She also released a Documentary offering a behind the scenes look into the work she put into producing the record. The album has a more upbeat mood and features piano, ukulele and four songs in French.

She selected and directed a total of 12 people while creating and managing the album. Brian Scheuble (Elton John, Sheryl Crow, Liz Phair) mixed the album and Grammy-nominated Joe Lambert (Moby, Sinéad O'Connor) was the mastering engineer. She emphasized in interviews the fact there are less than 10% of record producers who are women and her goal is to encourage other women to follow their vision.

In June 2019, she performed the American National Anthem at Citi Field, New York Mets. A few weeks later she also performed Live on Ukulele/piano accompanied by guitar and drums at the 13th annual Rockstock & Barrels surf, skate and music festival on Rockaway Beach, New York City.

She participated alongside Julian Lennon on a spoken-word track called "Voices of the People," which is part of the soundtrack album featuring Quincy Jones for the movie "One Little Finger", directed by Rupam Sarmah and released in fall 2019.

On 28 February 2020, before New York City's public health crisis and COVID-19 pandemic confinement, she shot with her team the music video "Feel Good" which was then officially released on 5 May 2020 with the deluxe edition of “Be Inspired”.

In August 2020, in an interview on "How Did I Get Here?", the podcast of Johnny Goudie, she talked about her latest album, "Be Inspired", and the need for a positive message during these uncertain times.

In November 2021, she was featured in the conclusion of The New York Times article “To Breed or Not to Breed” with her song “Childree” and discussed what women go through because of their choice to not have children. The song has become the “anthem” for childfree women and her goal is to support their freedom. The song uses a cover art where it shows as many as 50 faces of women who are happy without having children.

On Bastille Day 2023, she performed at New York’s Gantry Plaza State Park under the Gantry Towers at a free event that she co-organized with New York State Parks.

== Discography ==
=== Albums ===
- Neverending Sundown (with Hate Dies Hard) (2006)
- Will you hate the rest of the world or will you renew your life? (2010) - Includes "Renew", "Keep This For You", "Sally's Song", "Should you Get Mad"
- Beautiful Sun (2012) - Includes "Thank You", "Like a Feather", "The Only One"
- Be Inspired (December 2018)
- Be Inspired (Deluxe Edition) (May 2020)

=== EPs ===
- LiLi Roquelin (2008) - Includes "Blues Alone", Music Video of "I Saw You"
- 2008 EP (Deluxe Edition) (2020) - Includes Exclusive Bonus Track dreamy acoustic version of "Blues Alone"

=== Singles and Side Projects ===
- "I Saw You" (2008)
- "Bliss of My Soul" Feat. R.e.a.P (Hip-Hop Remix) (2014)
- "Smile" (LiLi Roquelin & Peter Lobo) (2015)
- "Abolitionistas", "Liberty" (2015)
- "Don't You Know It's Christmas" (2017)
- "Childfree" (2021)
