= Sleep at Night =

Sleep at Night may refer to:

- "Sleep at Night", a 2020 song by the Chicks from Gaslighter
- "Sleep at Night", a 2022 song by Chris Brown from Breezy
