= Roaring 20's (film) =

Upcoming drama film

- Directed by: Laurent Slama
- Screenplay by: Laurent Slama; Joris Avodo; Noémie Schmidt; Francois Mark
- Produced by: Olivier Capelli; Laurent Rochette
- Production companies: Les Idiots; 21 Juin Cinéma
- Distributed by: Films Boutique
- Release date: June 12, 2021 (Tribeca)
- Running time: 85 min.
- Country: France
- Language: English

Roaring 20's (French: Années 20) is a 2021 French drama film directed by Laurent Slama from a screenplay that he co-wrote with Joris Avodo, Noémie Schmidt and Francois Mark.

It had its world premiere at the Tribeca Film Festival on June 12, 2021.

== Production ==
In April 2021, it was announced that Films Boutique acquired the distribution rights to the film.

The film was shot in one uninterrupted single sequence in Paris, France in mid 2020.
