= Gunman =

Gunman or Gunmen may refer to:

- A word sometimes used to describe a criminal armed with a gun
- A word used to call a gunfighter before the 20th century
- Gunman (film), a 1983 Thai crime film directed by Chatrichalerm Yukol
- Gunmen (1988 film), a 1988 Hong Kong action crime drama film
- Gunmen (1994 film), a 1994 action-comedy film directed by Deran Sarafian
- "Gunman" (187 Lockdown song), a 1997 song by speed garage duo 187 Lockdown
- Gunman Chronicles, a 2000 computer game by Rewolf Software
- The Gunman (2015 film), an American thriller film directed by Pierre Morel
- The Gunman (1952 film), an American western film directed by Lewis D. Collins
- "The Gunman", a song by Cher from It's a Man's World, 1995

== See also ==
- Gun (disambiguation)
- Gunner (disambiguation)
