= The Wolf House =

2018 Chilean film

- Film poster
- Spanish: La casa lobo
- Directed by: Cristobal León; Joaquín Cociña
- Written by: Cristóbal León; Joaquín Cociña; Alejandra Moffat
- Produced by: Catalina Vergara; Niles Atallah
- Starring: Amalia Kassai; Rainer Krause
- Cinematography: Cristobal León; Joaquín Cociña
- Production companies: Diluvio; Globo Rojo Films
- Distributed by: Interior13 Cine
- Release date: February 22, 2018 (Berlin)
- Running time: 75 minutes
- Country: Chile
- Languages: Spanish; German
- Budget: $245,000

The Wolf House (Spanish: La casa lobo) is a 2018 Chilean adult animated horror film directed by Cristobal León & Joaquín Cociña (in their directorial debuts) and written by León, Cociña and Alejandra Moffat. Inspired by the actual case of Colonia Dignidad, The Wolf House is presented as a fairy-tale themed animated propaganda film produced by the leader of the sect in order to indoctrinate its followers.

The film uses elements of avant-garde cinema, dark fantasy, psychological drama, surrealism, and supernatural horror. It had its world premiere at the 68th Berlin International Film Festival in the Forum section on February 22, 2018.

== Plot ==
María Wehrle is an idle and irresponsible girl living in the isolated Colony. When punished for her lack of contribution, she flees into the woods. She narrowly escapes a Wolf by taking refuge in an abandoned house.

She is welcomed by two pigs, the only inhabitants of the place. Like in a dream, the universe of the house reacts to Maria's feelings and shapes itself into her ideal home. The pigs transform into humans whom she names Ana and Pedro. Although the Wolf's presence outside prevents them from leaving, the group lives happily for a short time. María ignores the Wolf's repeated attempts to tempt her back to the Colony and denies its description of the house as a new kind of cage.

As time passes, the secluded house begins to run out of food. Ana and Pedro become increasingly hostile and secretive toward María, even hiding food from her. María, afraid to confront them, instead tries to leave the house and pick apples in the woods. Ana and Pedro stop her, claiming that there is enough food in the house and that leaving would only put her at risk of being caught by the Wolf. For the first time, María thinks longingly of the Colony and voices a more positive view of the Wolf, whom she believes knows the way home and would take care of her.

Ana and Pedro tie María to a bed to prevent her from leaving. As they stand over her discussing their hunger, María realizes they intend to eat her. Despairing, María prays to the Wolf, begging it to save her. The Wolf enters the house and kills Ana and Pedro. María then transforms into a bird and flies home to the Colony.

In a brief closing narration, the Wolf says María regained her helpful and hardworking spirit once she returned home. He offers to take the "little pigs" in the audience home to the Colony, where he promises he will care for them.

== Cast ==
- Amalia Kassai as María
- Rainer Krause as the Wolf

== Production ==
The film received production support from several projects, including the Chile Fund for Film Project Development and the FONDART from the National Council of Culture and the Arts.

It took five years to develop the film in the workshop with animators independently. It incorporates both drawn and stop motion animation; the former is used in the for opening and closing scenes, while the rest of the film transforms various objects into different forms entirely such as clay, paint, papier-mâché, and puppets, similar to previous short films created by León and Cociña. It also utilizes a single-shot sequence in order to appear like a one-shot film (except for the live-action metafictional opening scene).

=== Filming ===
The film was shot in several studios and exhibitions at museums of different cities from Latin America and Europe including the Upstream Gallery in Amsterdam, Netherlands, the Kampnagel in Hamburg, Germany and the Chilean National Museum of Fine Arts in Santiago, Chile.

== Release ==
The film had its world premiere at the 68th Berlin International Film Festival on February 22, 2018. It was also screened at the Annecy International Animation Film Festival where it won the Jury Distinction, the Monterrey International Film Festival and other Chilean festivals including the Valdivia Film Festival and the Viña del Mar International Film Festival.

== Reception ==
=== Critical response ===
On review aggregation website Rotten Tomatoes, the film has an approval rating of 96% based on 51 reviews, with an average rating of 7.9/10. The critical consensus reads "Surreal, unsettling, and finally haunting, The Wolf House is a stunning outpouring of creativity whose striking visuals queasily complement its disturbing story." On Metacritic the film has a weighted average score of 86 out of 100, based on 9 critics, indicating "universal acclaim".

Glenn Kenny of The New York Times gave the film a positive review writing: "The film surprises, with incredible force, in every one of its 75 minutes.". Jonathan Holland of The Hollywood Reporter praised the film for its visuals, writing: "the deeply uncanny pic makes for an unsettling viewing experience, a creative tour de force whose endlessly fascinating visuals are deliberately seductive and repellent in equal measure.". David Ehrlich of IndieWire rated the film a B+, calling it "one of the darkest animated movies ever made."

=== Awards and nominations ===
Award	Date of ceremony	Category	Recipient(s)	Result	Ref.
Annecy International Animation Film Festival	June 16, 2018	Cristal Award for Feature Film	The Wolf House	Nominated	
Annecy International Animation Film Festival	June 16, 2018	Jury Distinction	The Wolf House	Won	
Boston Society of Film Critics Awards	December 13, 2020	Best Animated Film	The Wolf House	Won	
Chicago Film Critics Association Awards	December 21, 2020	Best Animated Film	The Wolf House	Nominated	
Florida Film Critics Circle Awards	December 21, 2020	Best Animated Film	The Wolf House	Nominated	
Mar del Plata International Film Festival	November 17, 2018	Best Latin-American Film	The Wolf House	Nominated	
Online Film Critics Society Awards	January 25, 2021	Best Animated Film	The Wolf House	Nominated	
Pedro Sienna Awards	June 20, 2022	Best Animated Film	The Wolf House	Won	
Pedro Sienna Awards	June 20, 2022	Best Art Direction	Natalia Geisse, Cristóbal León, Joaquín Cociña	Won	
Pedro Sienna Awards	June 20, 2022	Best Sound Design	Claudio Vargas	Won	
Platino Awards	May 12, 2019	Best Animated Film	The Wolf House	Nominated	
Quirino Awards	April 6, 2019	Best Visual Development	Natalia Geisse, Cristóbal León, Joaquín Cociña	Won	
San Sebastian International Film Festival	September 29, 2018	Zabaltegi-Tabakalera Award	Cristóbal León, Joaquín Cociña	Nominated	
St. Louis Gateway Film Critics Association Awards	January 17, 2021	Best Animated Film	The Wolf House	Nominated	
Valdivia International Film Festival	October 14, 2018	Audience Award	Cristóbal León, Joaquín Cociña	Won	
Valdivia International Film Festival	October 14, 2018	Héctor Rios Award for Best Cinematography	Cristóbal León, Joaquín Cociña	Won	

== See also ==
- Cinema of Chile
- Arthouse animation
