= Sailing the Seas of Cheese =

Studio album by Primus
- Released: May 14, 1991
- Recorded: January 1991
- Studio: Fantasy (Berkeley, California)
- Genres: Funk metal; alternative metal
- Length: 45:40
- Label: Interscope
- Producer: Primus

Primus chronology
Frizzle Fry (1990)	Sailing the Seas of Cheese (1991)	Miscellaneous Debris (1992)

Sailing the Seas of Cheese is the second studio album and major label debut by the American rock band Primus. It was released on May 14, 1991, through Interscope Records. It spawned two promotional singles: "Jerry Was a Race Car Driver" and "Tommy the Cat".

== Album information ==
The album's first promotional single "Jerry Was a Race Car Driver" is known for its intricate bassline that Les Claypool played on a fretless six-string bass using the tapping technique. It also contains a sample from the movie The Texas Chainsaw Massacre 2 in which the character Chop Top exclaims "Dog will hunt!" The track "Los Bastardos" contains samples from the BBC television series The Young Ones including Vyvyan shouting, "Shut up, you bastards!", Vyvyan's mother saying, "He is a bastard isn't he?", as well as Rick saying, "You just called me a bastard, didn't you?" and "Mike, you bastard!"

"Tommy the Cat" is also characterized by its highly complex bassline that mixes strumming and slapping. There is not a clear consensus on exactly what notes are being played; as a result, numerous different interpretations exist on the Internet. The song features spoken word by Tom Waits providing the voice of the titular character; in live performances Claypool does these parts himself. Another example of the album's musical complexity is the song "Eleven", which is named after its unusual time signature of 11/8.

The song and album title "Seas of Cheese" would later be referenced in the song "DMV" on their next album Pork Soda, as well as the song "Dirty Drowning Man" on 1999's Antipop.

== Composition ==
Musically, Sailing the Seas of Cheese has been described as a funk metal and alternative metal album. Similar to its predecessor, Frizzle Fry, founding guitarist Todd Huth received writing credits on the songs "Tommy the Cat" and "Sgt. Baker".

== Release ==
Sailing the Seas of Cheese reached gold status in March 1993. It was certified platinum in December 2001.

=== 2013 reissue ===
A deluxe edition of the album was released on May 21, 2013. It is available in two six-panel Digipak configurations, each featuring the album’s new stereo mix on CD and the new 5.1 surround mix on Blu-ray or DVD, plus three exclusive, previously unreleased bonus tracks, and liner notes by music journalist Greg Prato. Claypool stated, “Musically, it holds up incredibly well. Sonically, it holds up fairly well. There’s some old-style reverbs that are a little bit syrupy. With modern technology, we can fix some of that stuff. But we don’t want to mess with it too much, because it is what it is. We want to fatten it up a little bit.”

== Critical reception ==
Professional ratings
Review scores
Source	Rating
AllMusic	4.5/5 stars
Chicago Tribune	3.5/4 stars
Entertainment Weekly	B+
Kerrang!	4/5
NME	7/10
Q	4/5 stars
Record Collector	4/5 stars
The Rolling Stone Album Guide	3.5/5 stars
Spectrum Culture	4/5
Spin Alternative Record Guide	7/10

Reviewing Sailing the Seas of Cheese for the Chicago Tribune, Greg Kot wrote that Primus "explore funk 'n' rock with bemused brilliance" and that "its musicianship, blending velocity with virtuosity, continues to set it apart from the crowded pool of punk-funk bands." Mike Gitter of Kerrang! called the album "as viciously strange an offering as any to come from a major label all year" and commented that Primus were "working without the shackles of genre" and "immersing the listener in the mire of their own hyper-reality." NME critic Stephen Dalton credited Primus for avoiding self-indulgence and "avant-wank fusion", while in Entertainment Weekly, Simon Reynolds said that the band are "too self-consciously goofy for their own good, but their rubber-boned thrash-funk can be cartoonish fun."

In a retrospective review for AllMusic, Steve Huey contends that "Sailing the Seas of Cheese completely redefined the possibilities of the electric bass in rock music for those who'd never heard the group before." He describes the album as "mostly riff-driven, fleshing out their heavy metal roots with prog rock tricks from Rush and Frank Zappa, as well as the novelty side of Zappa's sense of humor." He notes that "the willful goofiness may alienate some listeners, but ... it never detracts from the band's frequently stunning musicianship" and concludes that the album is "the tightest, most song-oriented representation of their jaw-dropping, one-of-a-kind style."

In a 2015 Noisey interview, Les Claypool ranked Sailing the Seas of Cheese as his second favorite Primus album behind Frizzle Fry, believing the work to be "probably [Primus'] most respected album". In addition, Claypool also outlined the experience of releasing the record on a major label, and the consequent inspiration for the album's title, when he remarked:

But [Sailing the Seas of Cheese] was also that record like 'Here we are, about to release something on a major label,' and we're right alongside the other bands that were popular at the time, which were these hairball bands—the Poisons, and the Guns N' Roses, and these different things that we just did not fit in with. That was the impetus of the title, because we just knew all of a sudden we were going to be thrust into this world where we weren't sure anyone thought we belonged.

== Live performance ==
The album was performed live in its entirety in 2003 and 2004 on their Tour De Fromage, on December 30, 2010 and once more during a two night show at Royal Albert Hall in April 2012.

== Track listing ==
All lyrics are written by Les Claypool; all music is composed by Primus (Claypool, Larry LaLonde and Tim Alexander), except where noted; guitar melodies on “Sgt. Baker” and “Tommy the Cat” by Todd Huth.

No.	Title	Music	Length
1.	"Seas of Cheese"	Claypool	0:42
2.	"Here Come the Bastards"		2:55
3.	"Sgt. Baker"	Claypool, Huth, LaLonde, Alexander	4:16
4.	"American Life"		4:32
5.	"Jerry Was a Race Car Driver"		3:11
6.	"Eleven"		4:19
7.	"Is It Luck?"		3:27
8.	"Grandad's Little Ditty"	Claypool	0:37
9.	"Tommy the Cat" (featuring Tom Waits)	Claypool, Huth, LaLonde, Alexander	4:15
10.	"Sathington Waltz"		1:42
11.	"Those Damned Blue-Collar Tweekers"		5:20
12.	"Fish On (Fisherman Chronicles, Chapter II)"		7:45
13.	"Los Bastardos"		2:39
Total length:			45:40

Japanese edition bonus tracks
No.	Title	Lyrics	Music	Length
14.	"Intruder" (Peter Gabriel cover)	Gabriel	Gabriel	4:18
15.	"Making Plans for Nigel" (XTC cover)	Colin Moulding	Moulding	3:33
Total length:				53:31

2013 Deluxe bonus tracks
No.	Title	Length
14.	"Those Damned Blue-Collar Tweekers" (Live at Bass Hall, Austin, TX, 11/07/2012)	7:54
15.	"American Life" (Live at Bass Hall, Austin, TX, 11/07/2012)	11:37
16.	"Here Come the Bastards" (Bassnectar remix)	5:18
Total length:		70:29

== Personnel ==
Primus

- Les Claypool – vocals, bass, string bass, six-string fretless bass, clarinet, production
- Larry LaLonde – guitar, six-string banjo, production
- Tim "Herb" Alexander – drums, percussion, water jug, production

Additional performers

- Mike Bordin – two-skinned foreskin drum
- Matt Winegar – accordion, guitar
- Tom Waits – voice of Tommy the Cat
- Trouz – whistle
- Jay Lane – drums (2013 Deluxe bonus tracks)

Production

- Ron Rigler – engineering
- Chris Bellman – mastering
- Tom Whalley – A&R director
- Adam Gates – additional fisherman
- Lance Montoya – additional fisherman

Artwork

- Paul Haggard – jacket design, photography
- Mark Kohr – cheese coordinator, scenery
- Michael Lavine – band photo
- Lance Montoya – sculptures
- Mitch Romanowski – ship (sculpture)
- Snap – airbrushing

Bastardos

- Brain Mantia, Mike Bordin, Herb – drums
- MIRV Haggard, Todd Huth, Derek Greenberg, Matt Winegar, Ler – guitars
- Butthouse, Adam Gates, Les – bass
- Adam Gates, Puffster, Herb, Ler, Les – vocals

== Charts ==
Year	Chart	Peak position
1991	US Billboard 200	116
1992	US Heatseekers Albums (Billboard)	2
1994	Australian Albums (ARIA)	111

== Certifications ==
Region	Certification	Certified units/sales
United States (RIAA)	Platinum	1,000,000^{^}
^{^} Shipments figures based on certification alone.
