= Ibero-American Festival of Short films ABC =

Festival Iberoamericano de Cortometrajes ABC (FIBABC)
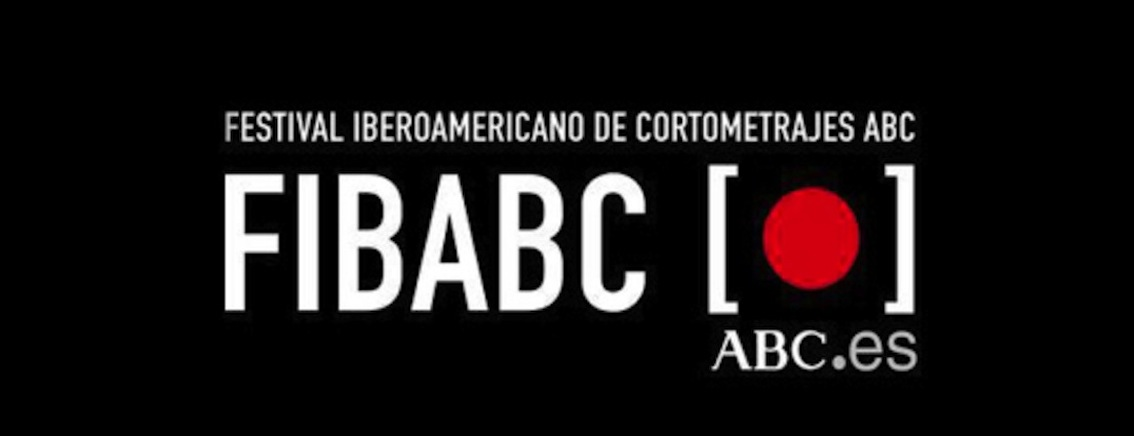
- Location: Madrid, Spain
- Founded: 2009
- Festival date: 5 September – 25 November
- Language: International
- Website: fibabc.abc.es

The Ibero-American Festival of Short films ABC (FIBABC) (Spanish: Festival Iberoamericano de Cortometrajes ABC (FIBABC)) has its origins in the 2009 when the journalists and film makers, helmed by Pedro Touceda Fernandez and supported by the Spanish ABC with the Community of Madrid and Spanish Academy of Arts and Cinematographic Sciences (AACCE) set up an international cinematographic festival of short films. The FIBABC takes place every year between 5 September – 25 November.

== Editions ==
• 2010 • 2011 • 2012 • 2013 • 2014 • 2015 • 2016 • 2017 • 2018 •

== Impact ==
The festival has become an important showcase for International Short films from all over the world.

== Programmes ==
The FIBABC Film Festival is organised in various sections:

- Festival de cortometrajes – The main yearly event of the Short films festival.
  - In Competition – About 350 films competing for the Awards. They are projected in the fibabc.abc.es.

== Juries ==
The Festival's board of filmmakers appoints the juries responsible for choosing which films will receive a FIBABC award.

== Awards ==
- Competition
  - Premio del Jurado al Mejor Cortometraje de FIBABC – Jury Prize to Best Short Film
  - Premio al Mejor Cortometraje Español de Ficción - Best Spanish Fiction Film
  - Premio al Mejor Cortometraje de América Latina - Best Latino American Film
  - Premio a la Mejor Actor – Best Actor
  - Premio a la Mejor Actriz – Best Actress
  - Premio de la Crítica de ABC al Mejor Corto no estrenado en España – Critics Prize to Best Short Film
  - Premio del Público al Mejor Cortometraje – Viewers Prize
  - Premio al Mejor Corto de Escuela de Cine/Centro Universitario – Best Student film
  - 1ª Mención Especial del Jurado – First Special Mention of Jury
  - 2ª Mención Especial del Jurado – Second Special Mention of Jury
  - 3ª Mención Especial del Jurado – Third Special Mention of Jury
- I-Shorts Contest
  - Premio del Jurado al Mejor i-Corto - Jury Prize to Best I-Short
  - 1ª Mención Especial del Jurado - First Special Mention of Jury
  - 2ª Mención Especial del Jurado - Second Special Mention of Jury
  - Premio del Público al Mejor i-Corto - Viewers Prize to Best I-Short
