= Pork Soda =

Studio album by Primus
- Released: April 20, 1993
- Recorded: Winter 1992 in San Rafael, California
- Genres: Funk metal; alternative metal; alternative rock
- Length: 57:40
- Labels: Interscope; Prawn Song
- Producer: Primus

Primus chronology
Miscellaneous Debris (1992)	Pork Soda (1993)	Tales from the Punchbowl (1995)

Singles from Pork Soda
- 1. "My Name Is Mud" Released: 1993; 2. "DMV" Released: 1993; 3. "Mr. Krinkle" Released: 1993

Pork Soda is the third studio album by the American rock band Primus. It was released on April 20, 1993, by Interscope Records and Prawn Song Records. The album was certified gold in September 1993 and platinum in May 1997. The 2005 reissue comes in a digipak and contains a booklet with lyrics printed to nine songs, omitting "Pork Soda", which consists of a series of unintelligible rants. Claypool explained the term "pork soda" was meant to refer to how Primus – a band that, in his eyes, wasn't suitable for radio play – was "an acquired taste, like a meat-flavored soda would be", and that "Pork Soda is the exact opposite of what people want from a soda these days. It’s got all the cholesterol, all the calories".

The album debuted at number seven on the Billboard 200 chart, which some music critics considered surprising considering the group's uncommercial sound. It became the group's first top-10 album and sold half a million copies. Singles from it include "My Name Is Mud" and "Mr. Krinkle". The album was performed in its entirety for the first time at the Fox Oakland Theatre on December 31, 2015.

== Music and lyrics ==
The album contains darker content than previous Primus efforts, featuring lyrics dealing with murder ("My Name Is Mud"), suicide ("Bob"), and alienation ("Nature Boy"). The band has commented that prior to recording, they had been touring for nearly two solid years, thus were in a somber mood, but in a 2015 interview, frontman Les Claypool described the era surrounding the album as "Good times, happy times. It's not like we were reflecting any personal drama or anything." Claypool also noted he was "getting more into the six-string", giving the album a heavier edge.

Regarding the song "Wounded Knee", drummer Tim Alexander said, "I needed a name. I was reading this book called Bury My Heart at Wounded Knee. It was something I never really thought about before... I mean how this country came to be. We are taught to be so proud. But a lot of what we have is based on lies and deceit. They only teach you what they want you to know. I hope people will see the title and check it out. Next time you listen to 'Wounded Knee', try and put the story and the music together. The rhythm and the pulse, there is an element of it that is angry then peaceful."

Production-wise, Pork Soda was the first album the band recorded entirely on their own, opting to record in their rehearsal space and spending the advance on recording equipment to be able to do so.

== Reception ==
Professional ratings
Review scores
Source	Rating
AllMusic	4.5/5 stars
Chicago Tribune	2/4 stars
Christgau's Consumer Guide	(2-star Honorable Mention)
Encyclopedia of Popular Music	4/5 stars
Entertainment Weekly	B
Kerrang!	3/5 stars
Pitchfork	7.8/10
Q	3/5 stars
Rolling Stone	3/5 stars
Spin Alternative Record Guide	6/10

In his review of Pork Soda, Neil Perry of Kerrang! called it "a focused mess" that is driven by the "extraordinary percussive attack" from Alexander and Claypool, with guitarist Larry LaLonde "[hovering] on the edge of the action, throwing out sporadic mutant chords and droning feedback when the fancy takes him." Reviewing the album for Entertainment Weekly, Deborah Frost notes that "the band is starting to gel". She describes Pork Soda as "goofy" and "Zappa-esque", predicting that the "alternative-metal-fusion will appeal mostly to folks who like a little fizz with their lard." Tom Sinclair, for Rolling Stone, describes the album as "an amalgam of elements that have no reason to be joined together in a sane universe", noting that "the band invokes the circa '69 Mothers of Invention and Trout Mask Replica-era Captain Beefheart as often as it does George Clinton or Bootsy Collins." He concludes that "hard-core funk-metal freaks may find it all a bit diffuse, but if you think its high time surrealism entered the mosh pits of America, Pork Soda just may be your cup of meat."

In his retrospective review for AllMusic, Steve Huey contends that Pork Soda is "one of the strangest records ever to debut in the Top Ten." He notes that the album "showcases the band's ever-increasing level of musicianship" and that "[their] ensemble interplay continues to grow in complexity and musicality", although "[the] material isn't quite as consistent as Seas of Cheese". He concludes that "the band keeps finding novel variations on their signature sound, even if they never step out of it." David Fricke of Trouser Press similarly said that Pork Soda debuting in the top ten of the Billboard chart was "a remarkable achievement for such an idiosyncratic combo." Despite praising some songs, he felt a "slight predictability" had crept into the band's "winning, weirdo ways", with Claypool's melodramatic singing "blurring the shades of black humor in his lyrics," and that despite Primus' inventive complexity, "the herky-jerky time and tempo changes don't always provide enough variety."

Chris Norris of Spin Alternative Record Guide (1995) writes that much of the record resembles "a pissed-off octopus flailing around a gymnasium", with half of the songs "bashed out in the studio", but because it sold over half a million copies, "the band's perversion of astounding chops starts to feel like a genuinely subversive act. Maybe this is what Van Halen looks like post Ren, Stimpy, and Nirvana." In The Rough Guide to Rock (1999), Alex Ogg called it Primus' breakthrough album and wrote that while they were not original, "you can forgive a band a great deal if they take themselves so (un)seriously and deliver songs and catchy and immediate at these." Reviewing Pork Soda in Christgau's Consumer Guide (2000), Robert Christgau highlighted "Bob" and "DMV" and called Primus "quite possibly the strangest top-10 band ever, and good for them." Chris Ott of Pitchfork included Pork Soda in a list of albums common in second-hand stores and believed that Primus had largely become "a one-liner" ever since the album's release. He stated that while it benefitted from the Lollapalooza tour that Primus played on, the record was less inspired than its predecessors, adding that "apart from the clicking tempo gimmickry of 'My Name is Mud' and a brief percussion solo from drummer Herb ('Wounded Knee'), there isn't a single new idea on Pork Soda."

== Track listing ==
All lyrics are written by Les Claypool; all music is composed by Primus (Claypool, Larry LaLonde and Tim Alexander), except where noted.

No.	Title	Music	Length
1.	"Pork Chop's Little Ditty" (instrumental)	Claypool	0:21
2.	"My Name Is Mud"		4:48
3.	"Welcome to This World"		3:40
4.	"Bob"		4:40
5.	"DMV"		4:58
6.	"The Ol' Diamondback Sturgeon (Fisherman's Chronicles, Part 3)"		4:39
7.	"Nature Boy"		5:35
8.	"Wounded Knee" (instrumental)		2:25
9.	"Pork Soda"		2:20
10.	"The Pressman"		5:11
11.	"Mr. Krinkle"		5:27
12.	"The Air Is Getting Slippery"		2:31
13.	"Hamburger Train" (instrumental; beginning sample is audio of Paul Reubens from the film Nice Dreams)		8:11
14.	"Pork Chop's Little Ditty" (instrumental)	Claypool	1:03
15.	"Hail Santa" (instrumental)	Claypool	1:51
Total length:			57:40

== Personnel ==
=== Primus ===
- Les Claypool – vocals, bass guitar, mandolin (tracks 1 & 14), double bass
- Larry LaLonde – electric guitar, banjo (tracks 12 & 15)
- Tim "Herb" Alexander – drums, percussion, marimba, bicycle bell (track 15)

=== Production ===
- Derek Featherstone – engineer
- Leslie Gerard-Smith – project coordinator
- John Golden, K-Disk – mastering
- Manny LaCarrubba, Neil King, Kent Matchke – second engineers
- Ron Rigler – engineer
- Tom Whalley – A&R direction

=== Visual art ===
- Jay Blakesburg – front cover and background photography
- Paul "Bosco" Haggard – cover layout
- Lance "Link" Montoya – sculpture
- Snap – airbrushing

== Charts ==
Album

Chart (1993–1994)	Peak position
Australian Albums (ARIA)	54
New Zealand Albums (RMNZ)	45
UK Albums (Official Charts)	56
US Billboard 200	7

Singles

Year	Single	Chart	Position
1993	"My Name Is Mud"	US Modern Rock Tracks	9

== Certifications ==
Region	Certification	Certified units/sales
United States (RIAA)	Platinum	1,000,000^{^}
^{^} Shipments figures based on certification alone.
