= Tragedy's a' Comin' =

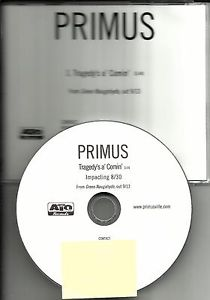
- CD single release

Single by Primus

from the album Green Naugahyde
- Released: 2011
- Genre: Funk rock, experimental rock
- Length: 4:52
- Label: Interscope
- Songwriter: Claypool/LaLonde/Lane
- Producer: Primus

Primus singles chronology
"Electric Uncle Sam" (1999)	"Tragedy's a' Comin'" (2011)	"Lee van Cleef" (2011)

"Tragedy's a' Comin'" is the first single from Green Naugahyde, the seventh studio album by rock band Primus. It marked the band's first new material since 2003's Animals Should Not Try to Act Like People EP. It is their first single in 12 years.

Green Naugahyde is the first Primus album to feature the trio of bassist/vocalist Les Claypool, guitarist Larry LaLonde and drummer Jay Lane who originally left Primus in 1988 before their Suck On This debut set.

== Music video ==
A music video debuted on the internet soon after the single was released.

Three music videos have been released to promote the album. The first was made for "Tragedy's a' Comin'", co-directed by Claypool and Mark Kohr, who had previously directed a number of the band's videos in the early 1990s. It was filmed on location at the Anchor & Hope restaurant in downtown San Francisco, and depicts kitchen staff preparing lobsters which are then served to diners by the maître d', played by Kohr. The scene is keenly observed by one of the lobsters waiting to be cooked, and intercut with a fantasy sequence of that lobster imagining itself alone on a remote beach, played by Claypool. Throughout the video, an anonymous figure is shown riding a horse while wearing a space suit, who eventually arrives at the restaurant and orders the lobster, which is then cooked and served to them. Other scenes include some of the restaurant's diners spontaneously breaking out into dance, joined by the maître d', and footage of the band members playing their instruments individually, each superimposed with stylised outlines of the other members animated over a panning photograph of more lobsters.

Claypool said of the video,

Musically, it's upbeat, but lyrically, the song is all about impending doom ... But to depict that would have been the cliché thing to do, so we've got lobsters.

The video premiered on November 17, 2011 via the Independent Film Channel website, before being uploaded to Primus' official YouTube channel on December 14.

== Meaning ==
Claypool told Spin magazine the song's subject matter describes the end of the world: "Lyrically, this is me focusing on eventual demise or at least the notion that big rain is coming and at some point I'm going to get pretty fucking wet."

Claypool told MusicRadar why he discussed such a dark subject matter with humor on this song:

There's a lot of crazy shit in my life right now: My mom is fading away from us; she's not going to be around much longer. My little nephew was diagnosed with leukemia at only two months old. I have friends battling cancer. When I wrote that song, I was just like, "Holy fucking hell ..." Whatever metaphor you want to use: Into everyone's life a little rain must fall. Well, there you go – Tragedy's A-Comin'. The funny thing is, the music to that song is very uplifting. I love the contrast of it. From Tommy The Cat to Wynona's Big Brown Beaver, there's a lot of tragic figures in my music and Primus' music. It's just the way I exorcise my demons, through these kinds of people.

== Review ==
Paste magazine had the following to say about the new single:

This will be our last (and most direct) stop in Antipop land for a while. This bit of ska-metal could be the sequel to "Ballad of Bodacious". Claypool sometimes works against himself with such a heavy flange effect on his bass, but I understand how sometimes you need your bass to sound like a guitar when you're playing riffs. Here, he goes back and forth from the clean funky pops during the main theme and bridge, to a flange-drench for the verse and chorus. This song doesn't seem to be about tragedy in the big picture sense, so much as some low-life named Tragedy who is indeed on his way over.

== Charts ==
Chart (2010)	Peak position
US Alternative Songs (Billboard)	39

== See also ==
- Green Naugahyde
- Les Claypool
- Larry Lalonde
- Jay Lane
