= Mr. Krinkle =

Promotional single by Primus

from the album Pork Soda
- Released: 1993
- Studio: Ultrasound (San Rafael, California)
- Length: 5:27
- Label: Interscope; Atlantic
- Songwriters: Les Claypool; Larry LaLonde; Tim Alexander
- Producer: Primus

Primus singles chronology
| "DMV" (1993) | "Mr. Krinkle" (1993) | "Wynona's Big Brown Beaver" (1995) |

Music video
- "Mr. Krinkle" on YouTube

"Mr. Krinkle" is a song by American rock band Primus. It was released as a promotional single from their third studio album, Pork Soda (1993).

== Music video ==
A music video was made for the song, which features the band performing in an abandoned warehouse as a carnival of oddities parades behind them. Les Claypool is dressed as a fat, tuxedo-wearing pig playing an upright bass, Larry LaLonde as a 1980s glam rocker, and Tim Alexander in a kabuki attire. Claypool's wife and her twin sister are also featured.

Due to logistical issues, the video had to be shot in one single continuous take. Claypool said he put his "heart and soul" into the video, but it received next to no airtime on MTV. In an interview with Guitar World magazine, Claypool disparaged the channel's unwillingness to air the video, saying "it got played like six times." It did, however, receive some airplay on Headbangers Ball. "The Making of Mr. Krinkle" was released on Animals Should Not Try to Act Like People.
