= Immortality (2016 film) =

- International Poster
- Directed by: Mehdi Fard Ghaderi
- Written by: Mehdi Fard Ghaderi
- Produced by: Javad Norouzbeigi
- Cinematography: Amin Jafari
- Release date: 2016
- Running time: 145 minutes
- Country: Iran

Immortality (Persian: جاودانگی - Javdanegi) is a 2016 Iranian experimental drama film directed by Mehdi Fard Ghaderi. and his first feature film.

This movie was recorded entirely on the train. All of the footage takes place on a rainy night using a 145-minute Steadicam one-shot sequence. Immortality was filmed in fourteen nights, and the film was shot twelve times until the end. The final film is one of those twelve takes.

World premiere Immortality was in Rome Film Fest 2016.

== Plot ==
All the events of this movie take place on a rainy night on a train and it tells the story of the lives of six families in different train carriages, which is narrated with time shifts.

An old man is informed that he has only three more days to live, he is on a train to go to his cottage and be there when he dies. Slowly his dreams begin.

== Cast ==
- Manocher Alipour
- Anna Nemati
- Maral Farjad
- Faghiheh Soltani
- Soudabe Beizzaii
- Atabak Naderi
- Alireza Ostadi

== Reception ==
First premiere Immortality was at the main competition 11th Rome Film Festival 2016 in Italy. Italian critics wrote positive reviews about the film.

Then this film was then screened at the Munich Film Fest, 2017 in Germany and Transylvania Film Festival 2017 in Romania.

Immortality was screened in twenty international film festivals around the world. This film won prizes from several international festivals from United States and Italy.

== Awards & Nomination ==
Year	Festival		Category	Result	Ref(s)
2016	Rome International Film Festival	Italy	Gala	Nominated	
2016	One Take International Film Festival	Croatia	Best Film	Nominated	[17]
2016	Hanoi International Film	Vietnam	Best Film	Nominated	
2016	Jogja-NETPAC International Film Festival	Indonesia	Iranian Independent	Nominated	
2017	Munich International Film Fest	Germany	International Independents	Nominated	
2017	Transylvania International Film Festival	Romania	World Cinema	Nominated	
2017	Ischia International Film Festival	Italy	Best Film	Won	
2017	Middlebury International film festival	United States	Best Film	Nominated	
2017	Lucania International film festival	Italy	Best Film	Nominated	
