= International Labor Film Festival =

Coordinates: 39°55′N 32°51′E

- Location: Istanbul, Ankara, İzmir, Turkey
- Founded: 2006
- Language: International
- Website: iff.org.tr

International Labor Film Festival or Labor Film Festival is a film festival in Turkey, starting from May 1 (May Day) and continuing until May 8, every year since 2006.

The festival starts every year in Istanbul, Ankara and İzmir between May 1 and 8, and after these dates it travels to many cities in Turkey.

Workers' Film Festival is a non-competitive, ticketless and free film festival. In addition, various exhibitions are held at the festival. Worker Film Festival uses Karagöz and Charlie Chaplin figures, which it has introduced as the "festival mascot" since 2006, in all its posters and visuals. These festival mascots have also inspired banners in some actions.
