= Ischia Film Festival =

Annual film festival held in Ischia, Italy

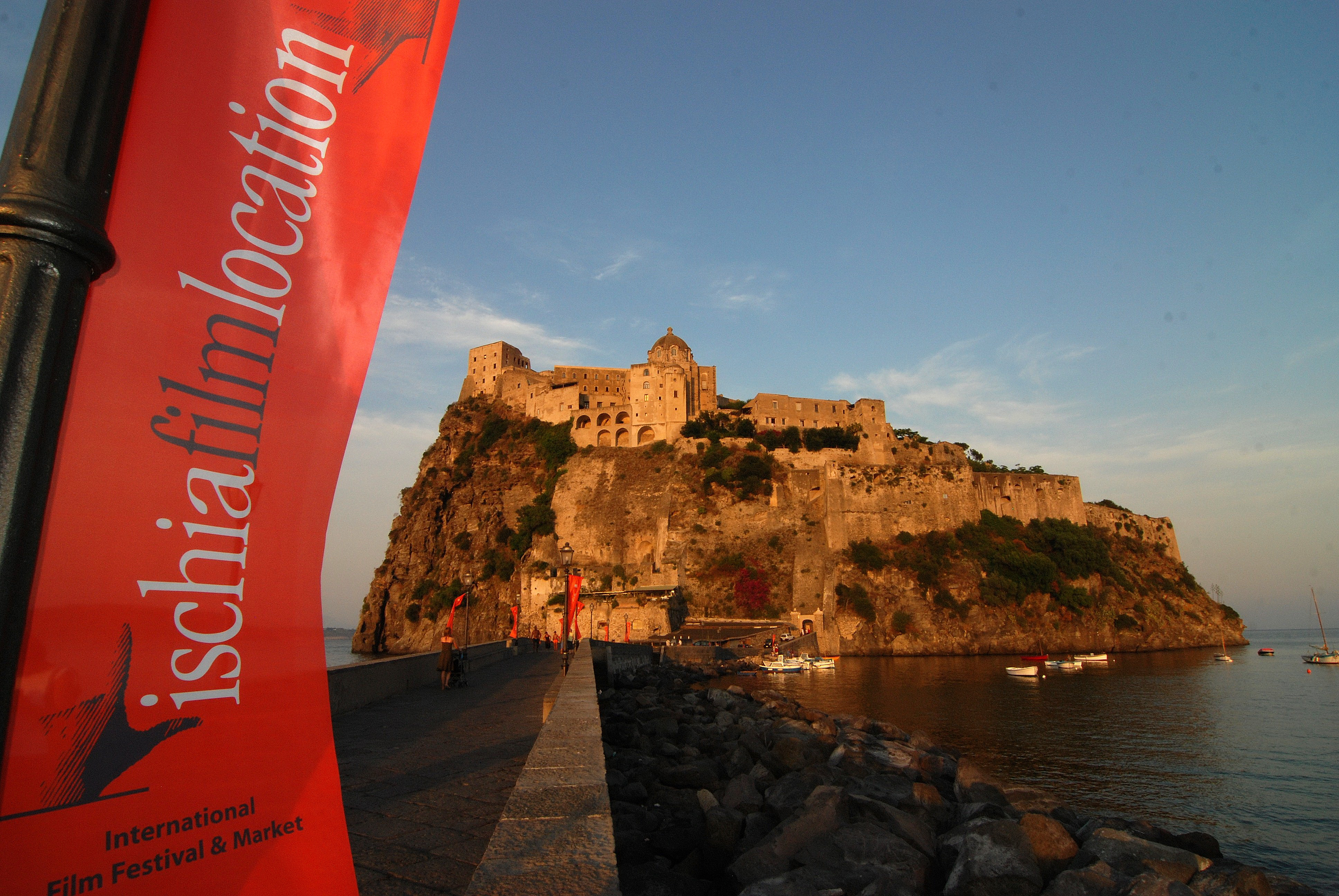
- Aragonese Castle, Ischia
- Location: Ischia, Italy
- Established: 2003; 22 years ago
- Founded by: Michelangelo Messina
- Most recent: 2025
- Language: International
- Website: www.ischiafilmfestival.it

The Ischia Film Festival (IFF) is an annual international film festival held in the Aragonese Castle on the island of Ischia, Italy in late June to early July. Founded in 2003 and as of 2023 still directed by Michelangelo Messina, the festival focuses on film locations. Feature films in competition are eligible for four awards, and there are separate awards for short films and other categories.

== History ==
The first edition of the festival was held in 2003 under the direction of Michelangelo Messina, when it was called the Foreigner Film Festival. By the second edition it had changed its name to Foreign Film Festival (subtitled European Location Film Festival), and by the third edition in 2005 it had changed its name to Ischia Film Festival.

The 21st edition ran from 25 June to 1 July 2023.

The 23rd edition was held from 28 June to 5 July 2025.

== Description ==
The festival is dedicated to film locations, hosting films which have a particular emphasis on their locations. It runs an international competition for feature films, short films, and documentaries.

It is organised by the Art Movie & Music Association, and held each year from late June into early July in the Castello Aragonese.

== Awards and honour committee ==
Each year, the IFF presents a Lifetime Achievement Award to international filmmakers and actors, after which the winners become part of a permanent honour committee of the festival. The committee includes Margarethe von Trotta, Peter Greenaway, John Turturro, Krzysztof Zanussi, Vittorio Storaro, and Tony Servillo.

Feature films are eligible for the following awards:

- Ischia Film Award, for best international film
- Castello Aragonese Award, for best director
- Epomeo Award, for best cinematography
- Aenaria Award, for the film that has best incorporated the location in its narrative

Awards are given in the following categories for best film in each, along with special mentions for each:

- International Short Films
- Location Denied
- Campanian Scenarios

== Organisers ==
As of 2023, the organisers of the festival include:

- Artistic director: Michelangelo Messina
- Artistic consultant: Gianni Canova
- Coordinator: Enny Mazzella
- Guest coordinator: Sara Messina
