= OK Go discography =

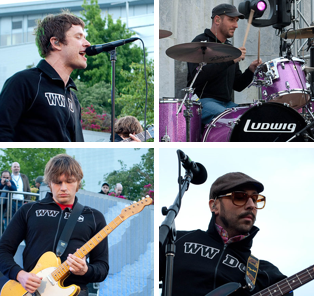
- Clockwise, from top left: Damian Kulash, Dan Konopka, Tim Nordwind, Andy Ross
- Studio albums: 5
- Extended plays: 7
- Live albums: 2
- Singles: 29
- Compilation appearances: 12

This is the full discography of American band OK Go.

== Studio albums ==
List of studio albums with selected chart positions
Title	Album details	Peak chart positions							Certifications
Title	Album details	US	US Rock	US Indie	AUS Hit.	JPN	UK	UK Indie	Certifications
OK Go	Release date: September 17, 2002; Label: Capitol; Format: CD, digital download	107	—	—	—	—	94	—	
Oh No	Release date: August 30, 2005; Label: Capitol; Format: CD, digital download	69	25	—	20	—	200	—	RIAA: Gold
Of the Blue Colour of the Sky	Release date: January 12, 2010; Label: Capitol; Format: CD, LP, digital download	40	7	—	15	265	—	—	
Hungry Ghosts	Release date: October 14, 2014; Label: Paracadute; Format: CD, LP, digital download	74	19	13	—	124	183	47	
And the Adjacent Possible	Release date: April 11, 2025; Label: Paracadute; Format: CD, LP, digital download	—	—	—	—	—	— (Note: And the Adjacent Possible did not enter the UK Albums Chart, but peaked at number 76 on the UK Album Downloads Chart.)	—	
"—" denotes a recording that did not chart or was not released in that territory.

== Live albums ==
List of live albums
Title	Album details
Live from the Fillmore New York at Irving Plaza	Released: November 23, 2009; Label: Capitol; Format: Digital download
180/365	Released: June 21, 2011; Label: Paracadute; Format: CD, digital download

== EPs ==
Title	EP details
OK Go (Brown EP)	Released: 2000
OK Go (Pink EP)	Released: 2001
Do What You Want	Released: June 14, 2005; Label: Capitol Records
iTunes Live from SoHo – EP	Released: June 5, 2007; Label: Capitol
Master the Treadmill with OK Go	Released: October 23, 2007; Label: Capitol
You're Not Alone (with Bonerama)	Released: February 5, 2008; Label: Capitol
Upside Out	Released: June 17, 2014; Label: Paracadute
On Bells	Released: October 2, 2026; Label: Paracadute

== Singles ==
List of singles, with selected chart positions and certifications, showing year released and album name
Title	Year	Peak chart positions										Certifications	Album
Title	Year	US	US Rock	AUS	CAN Rock	JPN	NZ	POR	SCO	UK	UKR	Certifications	Album
"Get Over It"	2002	—	— (Note: "Get Over It" did not enter the Hot Rock & Alternative Songs, but peaked at number 20 on the Alternative Airplay chart.)	— (Note: "Get Over It" did not enter the Australian ARIA Singles Chart but peaked at number 49 on the Australian Music Report Singles Chart.)	—	—	—	—	24	21	—		OK Go
"Don't Ask Me"	2003	—	—	—	—	—	—	—	—	—	—		OK Go
"A Million Ways"	2005	—	—	—	—	—	—	—	41	43	175		Oh No
"Do What You Want"	2006	— (Note: "Do What You Want" did not enter the Billboard Hot 100, but peaked at number 34 on the Hot Singles Sales chart.)	—	—	—	—	—	—	75	133	—		Oh No
"Oh Lately It's So Quiet"	2006	—	—	—	—	—	—	—	—	—	—		Oh No
"Invincible"	2006	—	—	—	—	—	—	—	—	—	—		Oh No
"Here It Goes Again"	2006	38	— (Note: "Here It Goes Again" did not enter the Hot Rock & Alternative Songs, but peaked at number 17 on the Alternative Airplay chart.)	63	44	—	28	42	41	36	195	RIAA: 2× Platinum; BPI: Silver; RMNZ: Gold	Oh No
"WTF?"	2009	—	—	—	—	—	—	—	—	—	—		Of the Blue Colour of the Sky
"This Too Shall Pass"	2010	—	— (Note: "This Too Shall Pass" did not enter the Hot Rock & Alternative Songs, but peaked at number 36 on the Alternative Airplay chart.)	97	—	—	—	—	—	—	—		Of the Blue Colour of the Sky
"End Love"	2010	—	—	—	—	—	—	—	—	—	—		Of the Blue Colour of the Sky
"White Knuckles"	2010	—	— (Note: "White Knuckles" did not enter the Hot Rock & Alternative Songs, but peaked at number 36 on the Alternative Airplay chart.)	—	—	66	—	—	—	—	—		Of the Blue Colour of the Sky
"The Greatest Song I Ever Heard"	2011	—	—	—	—	—	—	—	—	—	—		The Greatest Soundtrack Ever Sold
"All Is Not Lost"	2011	—	—	—	—	—	—	—	—	—	—		Of the Blue Colour of the Sky
"Needing/Getting"	2012	—	—	—	—	—	—	—	—	—	—		Of the Blue Colour of the Sky
"Skyscrapers"	2012	—	—	—	—	—	—	—	—	—	—		Of the Blue Colour of the Sky
"The Writing's on the Wall"	2014	— (Note: "The Writing's on the Wall" did not chart on the Billboard Hot 100 but did peak at number one on the Bubbling Under Hot 100 Singles chart, which is an extension of the Billboard Hot 100.)	10	—	—	—	—	—	—	—	—		Hungry Ghosts
"I Won't Let You Down"	2014	71	7	—	—	22	—	—	—	—	—		Hungry Ghosts
"You're a Fucking Nerd and No One Likes You"	2015	—	—	—	—	—	—	—	—	—	—		Non-album single
"Upside Down & Inside Out"	2016	—	—	—	—	—	—	—	—	—	—		Hungry Ghosts
"I Don't Understand You" (with Perfume)	2016	—	—	—	—	— (Note: "I Don't Understand You" did not enter the Billboard Japan Hot 100 chart, but peaked at number 10 on the Billboard Japan Hot Overseas Songs chart.)	—	—	—	—	—		Non-album single
"The One Moment"	2016	—	9	—	—	—	—	—	—	— (Note: The One Moment did not enter the UK Singles Chart, but peaked at number 66 on the UK Video Streaming Chart.)	—		Hungry Ghosts
"Obsession"	2017	—	—	—	—	—	—	—	—	—	—		Hungry Ghosts
"All Together Now"	2020	—	—	—	—	—	—	—	—	—	—		Non-album singles
"This"	2023	—	—	—	—	—	—	—	—	—	—		Non-album singles
"A Stone Only Rolls Downhill"	2025	—	—	—	—	—	—	—	—	—	—		And the Adjacent Possible
"A Good, Good Day at Last" / "Going Home"	2025	—	—	—	—	—	—	—	—	—	—		And the Adjacent Possible
"A Good, Good Day at Last" / "Going Home"	2025	—	—	—	—	—	—	—	—	—	—		And the Adjacent Possible
"Take Me with You" / "This is How it Ends"	2025	—	—	—	—	—	—	—	—	—	—		And the Adjacent Possible
"Take Me with You" / "This is How it Ends"	2025	—	—	—	—	—	—	—	—	—	—		And the Adjacent Possible
"Love"	2025	—	— (Note: "Love" did not enter the Hot Rock & Alternative Songs, but peaked at number 39 on the Adult Alternative Airplay chart.)	—	—	—	—	—	—	—	—		And the Adjacent Possible
"—" denotes releases that did not chart
