= Of the Blue Colour of the Sky =

Studio album by OK Go
- Released: January 12, 2010
- Recorded: October 2008 – June 2009
- Studio: Tarbox Road (Cassadaga, New York)
- Genres: Alternative rock; power pop; neo-psychedelia; synth-pop; indie pop; funk rock
- Length: 51:14
- Labels: Capitol; EMI
- Producer: Dave Fridmann

OK Go chronology
You're Not Alone (2008)	Of the Blue Colour of the Sky (2010)	Twelve Days of OK Go (2012)

Singles from Of the Blue Colour of the Sky
- 1. "WTF?" Released: November 10, 2009; 2. "This Too Shall Pass" Released: January 17, 2010; 3. "End Love" Released: June 14, 2010; 4. "White Knuckles" Released: October 12, 2010; 5. "All Is Not Lost" Released: August 9, 2011; 6. "Last Leaf" Released: November 10, 2011; 7. "Needing/Getting" Released: February 5, 2012; 8. "Skyscrapers" Released: March 29, 2012

Of the Blue Colour of the Sky is the third studio album by American rock band OK Go. It was released on January 12, 2010, on Capitol Records in the US and EMI in the UK, and re-released on the band's independent label Paracadute Records on April 1. The album was produced by Dave Fridmann and was recorded in a span of seven months at Fridmann's Tarbox Road Studios in Cassadaga, New York. The album's name, lyrics, and concept are based on The Influence of the Blue Ray of the Sunlight and of the Blue Colour of the Sky, a pseudoscientific book published in 1876. Its style was noted as a significant departure from the power pop of their earlier albums. After the band's split with EMI and Capitol, Paracadute took over the promotional campaign and all distribution responsibilities. The album received generally positive reviews from music critics upon release and debuted at number 40 on Billboard 200 chart, making it their highest-charting album in the United States.

== Background ==
After the band's previous album Oh No was finished being recorded in 2005, guitarist Andy Duncan left the band, citing creative differences and major label pressures. He was replaced by Andy Ross, who was involved in the album's promotion, including music video appearances. The music videos for "A Million Ways" and "Here It Goes Again" attracted much attention as viral videos on YouTube, and were significantly influential in Oh No's success and rise in OK Go's popularity. Along with releasing the EP You're Not Alone with New Orleans brass funk rock band Bonerama in 2008, the band toured continually for almost three years in support of Oh No.

== Recording and production ==
OK Go finished writing new material and started working in the studio in October 2008. They worked for two-week intervals (opposite The Flaming Lips) in producer Dave Fridmann's Tarbox Road Studios, a converted Amish barn in Cassadaga, New York, through May the following year. Bassist Tim Nordwind described the process of the studio sessions as a midpoint between the slick production work done on OK Go and the emphasis on live takes with the recording of Oh No.

"WTF?" sample
Segment of "WTF?", the opening track of the album. The falsetto vocals and prominent bass guitar is a marked departure from the guitar-driven power pop style of earlier OK Go albums.

== Concept and art ==
Of the Blue Colour of the Sky's accompanying booklet presents the album as a concept based on an unnamed passage from The Influence of the Blue Ray of the Sunlight and of the Blue Colour of the Sky by General A.J. Pleasonton. The title of this book, proposing that blue is the essential life force, was adapted for the album because of the parallels between Pleasonton's faith in the color blue and Kulash's faith in the music that arises from him organically without rational thought. Elements of the booklet compare the lyrics with the passage, with data gathered from the characteristics of the texts presented by different graphical means. The image on the album cover was constructed with a list of twenty-five themes (for example "Unfounded or Wildly Broad Claims", "Wonderment", and "Light/Optics/Color"), each representing a specific color, assigned to each sentence in both the passage and the lyrics. If more than one theme is assigned to the same sentence, the colors are combined with additive mixing. With each sentence being represented by a colored line, the lines are arranged radially giving the impression of beams of multicolored light emanating from the center. Other data collected for presentation inside the booklet includes sentence length, parts of speech occurrences, syllable stress, and words common to both texts. Kulash, as the primary songwriter for the album, developed the concept and collected the data with Stefanie Posavec and Greg McInerny, who were credited with visualization and layout of the booklet.

== Re-releases ==
Since OK Go split from EMI, their label, Paracadute, re-released the album with two bonus tracks April 1, 2010. On September 19, they announced that an Extra Nice Edition was to be released in the USA on November 2. It features the standard thirteen-track album along with a bonus disk that includes demos, alternate versions, two covers, and an in-depth interview with the band by Ira Glass. Also, access to a digital database is included with its purchase. Music will continually be added to the database even though the album is out. So far, a digital-only album entitled Twelve Remixes of Four Songs is available for instant download along with the two physical disks in Apple Lossless files or medium-sized MP3s.

== Reception ==
Professional ratings
Aggregate scores
Source	Rating
Metacritic	(67/100)
Review scores
Source	Rating
AllMusic	3/5 stars
The A.V. Club	(A−)
BLARE Magazine	4/5 stars
The Boston Globe	(mixed)
Entertainment Weekly	(B−)
Los Angeles Times	(favorable)
Rock Sound	8/10 stars
Rolling Stone	3/5 stars
Slant Magazine	3/5 stars
Spin	3.5/5 stars

Of the Blue Colour of the Sky received mainly positive reviews from critics, earning a 67 out of 100 score on Metacritic, based on 22 critics, indicating "generally favorable reviews".

Barry Walters of Spin said compared the album to the creativity of their music videos from Oh No, writing that it was "similarly ambitious" how the foursome applied the two contrasting genres of "Prince's sexy synth-funk and the Flaming Lips' elaborate dream-rock." Writing for The A.V. Club, Chris Mincher contrasted the album favorably with OK Go's earlier output, describing a "darker atmosphere in which the band can release emotions other than goofy exuberance". Stephen Thomas Erlewine of Allmusic writes that the album "ultimately seems diffuse" and that the "spaciousness expands as the album rolls on, eventually obscuring the hooks of the first half". Adam Conner-Simons of The Boston Globe writes that although "OK Go occasionally seems to be trying too hard...the album delivers some of the band's most fully realized compositions to date." The video for the song "All Is Not Lost" was nominated for a 2012 Grammy Award for "Best Short-Form Music Video."

== Track listing ==
All songs credited to OK Go; actual writers listed below.

No.	Title	Writer(s)	Length
1.	"WTF?"	Damian Kulash, Jr.	3:25
2.	"This Too Shall Pass"	Kulash, Timothy Nordwind	3:08
3.	"All Is Not Lost"	Kulash, Nordwind	2:44
4.	"Needing/Getting"	Kulash, Nordwind	5:14
5.	"Skyscrapers"	Kulash	4:38
6.	"White Knuckles"	Kulash	3:19
7.	"I Want You So Bad I Can't Breathe"	Nordwind, Kulash	3:23
8.	"End Love"	Nordwind, Kulash	4:05
9.	"Before the Earth Was Round"	Kulash	4:09
10.	"Last Leaf"	Kulash	2:34
11.	"Back from Kathmandu"	Kulash	4:13
12.	"While You Were Asleep"	Andy Ross, Kulash	4:25
13.	"In the Glass"	Kulash	6:04
Total length:			51:14

iTunes US bonus track
No.	Title	Writer(s)	Length
14.	"Louisiana Land"	Kulash, Nordwind	3:38
Total length:			54:52

iTunes UK bonus track
No.	Title	Writer(s)	Length
13.	Untitled	Kulash
14.	"White Knuckles" (Static Revenger club mix)		4:20
Total length:			55:54

Paracadute re-release
No.	Title	Writer(s)	Length
14.	"Louisiana Land"	Kulash, Nordwind	3:38
15.	"This Too Shall Pass" (Sunday Hangover Passion Pit Remix)	Kulash, Nordwind	3:53
Total length:			58:45

Extra Nice Edition bonus disc
No.	Title	Writer(s)	Length
1.	"Skyscrapers" (Bristol version)	Kulash	4:29
2.	"Shooting the Moon"	Kulash, Nordwind	3:20
3.	"Louisiana Land"	Kulash, Nordwind	3:38
4.	"This Too Shall Pass" (Marching Band version)	Kulash, Nordwind	3:34
5.	"Gigantic" (Pixies cover)	Kim Deal, Black Francis	4:16
6.	"This Will Be Our Year" (The Zombies cover)	Chris White	2:08
7.	"This Too Shall Pass" (Passion Pit Sunday Hangover Remix)	Kulash, Nordwind	4:28
8.	"Skyscrapers" (demo)	Kulash	2:44
9.	"If You're Down" ("I Want You So Bad I Can't Breathe" demo)	Nordwind, Kulash	2:28
10.	"More Than You Could Know" ("Needing/Getting" demo)	Kulash, Nordwind	2:12
11.	"Back from Kathmandu" (demo)	Kulash	2:51
12.	"Over the Moon" ("Shooting the Moon" demo)	Kulash, Nordwind	3:07
13.	"Before the Earth Was Round" (demo)	Kulash	3:03
14.	"You Will Lose" ("All Is Not Lost" demo)	Kulash, Nordwind	0:42
15.	"Break the Sand" ("While You Were Asleep" demo)	Ross, Kulash	3:07
16.	"Last Leaf" (demo)	Kulash	1:03
17.	"The Sound of the New Record" (Ira Glass Interview Part 1)		3:37
18.	"Chatting with Dave" (Interview Part 2)		5:39
19.	"Dave Defends Distortion" (Interview Part 3)		1:03
20.	"Recording Last Leaf" (Interview Part 4)		2:02
21.	"Playing Live" (Interview Part 5)		4:18
22.	"Lyrics" (Interview Part 6)		4:54
Total length:			1:08:46

== Personnel ==
All credits for Of the Blue Colour of the Sky are adapted from the album's liner notes.

OK Go

- Damian Kulash, Jr. — lead vocals, guitars, programming, percussion; art concept
- Tim Nordwind — bass, vocals, glockenspiel (track 9)
- Andy Ross — guitars, keyboards, vocals
- Dan Konopka — drums

Additional musicians

- Mark Mullins — trombone (track 12)
- Brian L. Perkins — clapping (track 12)

Production

- Dave Fridmann — production, recording, mixing
- Greg Calbi — audio mastering
- Stefanie Pasavec — art concept, computation, visualization, layout
- Greg McInerny — art concept, computation, visualization, layout

== Twelve Remixes of Four Songs ==
On 25 July 2013, OK Go released the remix compilation Twelve Remixes of Four Songs, which includes (as the title suggests) twelve remixes of four songs from Of the Blue Colour of the Sky. It features five remixes of "White Knuckles", one of "All Is Not Lost", four of "This Too Shall Pass", two of "End Love", as well as the final album version of each track. Contributors to the album include Passion Pit, Neil Voss, Sam Sparro, and Static Revenger, among others. It was released onto streaming services and given a physical CD release.

No.	Title	Length
1.	"White Knuckles" (Neil Voss Remix)	3:18
2.	"White Knuckles" (Boys Like Us remix)	2:58
3.	"White Knuckles" (Sam Sparro remix)	5:57
4.	"White Knuckles" (Static Revenger remix)	4:46
5.	"White Knuckles" (Static Revenger instrumental remix)	4:02
6.	"White Knuckles" (album version)	3:20
7.	"All Is Not Lost" (Serious Business remix)	4:52
8.	"All Is Not Lost" (album version)	2:42
9.	"This Too Shall Pass" (Passion Pit remix)	3:54
10.	"This Too Shall Pass" (Shoes remix)	6:03
11.	"This Too Shall Pass" (Ra Ra Riot remix)	3:36
12.	"This Too Shall Pass" (J. Arthur Keenes Band remix)	3:45
13.	"This Too Shall Pass" (album version)	3:07
14.	"End Love" (Neil Voss remix)	3:20
15.	"End Love" (Subtractive remix)	4:18
16.	"End Love" (album version)	4:05
Total length:		1:04:03
