= Do What You Want =

Do What You Want may refer to:

- Do What You Want (album), an album by Garageland
- Do What You Want (EP), an EP by OK Go
  - "Do What You Want" (OK Go song)
- "Do What You Want" (The Presets song), a 2017 single
- Do What You Want (film), 1973 Argentine film
- "Do What You Want", a song by the Black Eyed Peas from Monkey Business
- "Do What You Want", a song by Bad Religion from Suffer
- "Do What You Want", a song by Drake Bell from It's Only Time
- "Do What You Want", a song by Fitz and the Tantrums from their self-titled album

== See also ==
- "Do What U Want", a song by Lady Gaga from Artpop
- "Do What You Wanna Do", debut single by T-Connection
- Do What You Like (disambiguation)
