= Amy Sterling Casil =

American science fiction writer (born 1962)

- Born: 1962 (age 63–64); Los Angeles, California, U.S.
- Education: Scripps College
- Occupation: Novelist
- Writing career
- Period: 1996–present
- Genre: Science Fiction
- Website: amysterlingcasil.com

Amy Sterling Casil (born 1962) is a science fiction writer from Los Angeles, California, now living in Florida. Her writing has often included Southern California themes. Her mother, Sterling Sturtevant, was an art director for animated films who worked for Walt Disney, Playhouse Pictures, UPA and Charles Schulz.

== Background, education and employment ==
A four-year National Merit Scholar, she graduated from Scripps College in 1983 with bachelor's degrees in British and American Literature and Studio Art. She was the first female editor and publisher of the Claremont Colleges' newsmagazine. She twice received the Crombie Allen Award for fiction writing at the Claremont Colleges. During her time at Scripps, she was raped and tortured. She has written at length about why she did not pursue prosecution of her rapist (a professor at Pomona College, whom she has named repeatedly).

Casil was the director of Family Service Association in Redlands, California from 1987 to 1997. In 1999, she received her MFA in creative writing from Chapman University with full honors, under committee chair James P. Blaylock. From 1998 to 2005, she taught English and creative writing at several Southern California colleges, including Chapman University and Saddleback College. From 2005, she was Director of Development for the Los Angeles-based nonprofit organization Beyond Shelter.

In April 2020, she moved to southwestern Florida's Gulf Coast.

Debbie Sterling of GoldieBlox is her niece.

== Science fiction writing ==
Casil attended the Clarion Science Fiction Writer's Workshop at Michigan State University in 1984. "Jonny Punkinhead," which appeared in the July 1996 New Writers issue of The Magazine of Fantasy & Science Fiction, was her first published genre story.

"To Kiss the Star" was a 2002 nominee for science fiction's Nebula Award. "Chromosome Circus" was a nominee for a HOMer Award on the CompuServe SF and Fantasy Forum. She has served three terms as treasurer of the Science Fiction Writers of America.

== Bibliography ==
=== Novels ===
- Imago. 2001.

=== Short fiction ===
Collections

- Without Absolution. 2001.
- To Kiss the Star and Other Stories

Stories

Title	Year	First published	Reprinted/collected	Notes
Mad for the mints	2000	Casil, Amy Sterling (Jul 2000). "Mad for the mints". F&SF. 99 (1): 4–26.		
To kiss the star	2001	Casil, Amy Sterling (Feb 2001). "To kiss the star". F&SF. 100 (2): 138–160.		
Shakespeare in Hell	2002			

- "Jonny Punkinhead" (1996)
- "Jenny, With the Stars in Her Hair" (Writers of the Future Volume XIV) (1998)
- "My Son, My Self" (Writers of the Future Volume XV) (1999)
- "The Color of Time" (Zoetrope All-Story) (1999)
- "Chromosome Circus" (Fantasy & Science Fiction–January) (2000)
- "Mad for the Mints" (Fantasy & Science Fiction–July)
- "To Kiss the Star" (Fantasy & Science Fiction–February)
- Perfect Stranger (Fantasy & Science Fiction) (2006)

=== As editor ===
- switch.blade "School's Out" Fictionwise original anthology (2002)

=== Nonfiction ===
- Buzz Aldrin: Pilot of the First Moon Landing (2004)
- Coping With Terrorism (2005)
- John Dewey: Founder of American Liberalism (2006)
- "Behind Every Good Man—and Woman". Guest Editorial. Analog Science Fiction and Fact. 135 (9): 4–7. September 2015.
- "Can Ghosts Teach Us Anything?". The Alternate View. Analog Science Fiction and Fact. 135 (11): 56–58. November 2015.

== Art ==
Covers of Alan Rodgers' Bone Music and Pandora; and Stephen Mark Rainey's Balak.
