= 7th Shorty Awards =

Awards show for short-form social web media content

The 7th Annual Shorty Awards
- Date: April 20, 2015
- Location: The Times Center, New York City
- Hosted by: Rachel Dratch

The 7th Annual Shorty Awards was hosted by comedian Rachel Dratch and took place on April 20, 2015 at The Times Center in NYC. The Real-Time Academy, the judging body of the Shortys, tripled in size for the 7th annual Awards and included Alton Brown, Mamrie Hart, Nikki Glaser, OK Go, The Fine Bros, Debbie Sterling, Dan Savage, Deena Varshavskaya and Palmer Luckey. Panic! at the Disco was the musical guest at the ceremony. On-stage presenters included Kevin Jonas, Bill Nye, Bella Thorne, Wyclef Jean, Emily Kinney and Tyler Oakley.

== Awards ==
=== Winners by category ===
==== Arts and Entertainment ====
Best Actor
- Chris Pratt
  - James Franco
  - Neil Patrick Harris
  - Misha Collins
  - Jensen Ackles
  - Osric Chau
  - Eric West

Category	Winner
Best Actor	Chris Pratt @prattprattpratt
Best Actress	Bella Thorne @bellathorne
Best Band	HAIM @HAIMtheband
Best Celebrity	Conan O'Brien @ConanOBrien
Best Comedian	Hannibal Buress @hannibalburess
Best Musician	Questlove @questlove & Lorde @lordemusic
Best Singer	Taylor Swift @taylorswift13
Best TV Show	The Tonight Show Starring Jimmy Fallon @FallonTonight
Best Vine Artist	Ian Padgham @origiful & Alicia Herber @leeshespieces
Best Vine Comedian	Brandon Bowen @BrandonRayBowen
Best Vine Musician	Shawn Mendes @ShawnMendes
Vine Star of the Year presented by Univision	Thomas Sanders @foster_dawg
Best Web Show	SourceFed @sourcefed
Best YouTube Comedian	Jenna Marbles @Jenna_Marbles
Best YouTube Guru presented by FYI	Michelle Phan @MichellePhan
Best YouTube Musician	Pentatonix @PTXofficial
YouTube Star of the Year presented by A&E	Smosh @smosh

==== Creative and design ====
Category	Winner
Best Artist	Katie Rodgers @paperfashion
Best Director	Alfredo Flores @alfredoflores
Best in DIY	Bethany Mota @bethanymota
Best in Fashion	Nicole Warne @garypeppergirl
GIF of the Year	Tiger Cub & Boy
Best Instagrammer	C+C Mini Factory @CCMiniFactory
Best in Photography	Nat Geo Photography @NatGeoPhotos
Best Pinner	HonestlyWTF @HonestlyWTF
Snapchatter of the Year	Jerome Jarre @jeromejarre
Vine of the Year	The 9 Month Vine by Ian Padgham @origiful & The Evolution of Sharing by Maris Jones @themarisjones

==== News and Media ====
Category	Winner
Best Athlete	Lauren Fleshman @laurenfleshman
Best Author	Susan Orlean @susanorlean
Best Blogger	Maria Popova @brainpicker
Best in Food	Alton Brown @altonbrown
Best in Healthy Living	Kris Carr @Kris_Carr
Best Journalist	Wesley Lowery @WesleyLowery
Newsworthy Photo of the Year	Ebola in Liberia by Daniel Berehulak @berehulak
Best in Science	Bill Nye @billnye
Tumblr Blog of The Year	If They Gunned Me Down
Best in Weird	Saved You A Click @SavedYouAClick

==== Tech and Innovation ====
Category	Winner
BN Student presented by Barnes & Noble College	Alexia Raye @AlexiaRaye
Business Blogger presented by Cox Business	Jeff Barrett @BarrettAll
Emoji of the Year	Poop Emoji
Best Fake Account	Bored Elon Musk @BoredElonMusk
Best Fansite	Taylor Swift Web @TaySwiftdotcom
Best in Gaming	Felix Kjellberg @pewdiepie
Best Non-Human	Congress Edits @congressedits
Best Parent	Marala Scott @MaralaScott
Best Podcast	Serial @serial
Top Breakout reddit Community	Serious Eats

==== Global Issues ====
Category	Winner
Best Activist	Katie Meyler @katiemeyler
Best in Brazil	Marina Silva @silva_marina
Best Charity	The Gates Foundation @gatesfoundation
Best in Green	Climate Desk @ClimateDesk
Best Teen Hero	Malala Yousafzai @malala

=== Special Award ===
Category	Winner
Distinguished Achievement in Internet Culture	The Vlogbrothers @hankgreen @johngreen

=== Seventh Annual Brand & Organization Winners by category ===
==== By Industry ====
Category	Winner
Best in Auto	Sold! Nissan Purchases 1996 Maxima from Brilliant Craigslist Ad produced by Nissan and Zocalo Group
Best in B2B	This Is a Generic Brand Video produced by Dissolve
Best in Consumer Electronics	Samsung Takes a Bite Out of the Competition produced by Big Spaceship
Best in Education	Mute the Mouth: An Above the Influence Game produced by Atmosphere Proximity
Best in Events	2014 MTV Video Music Awards produced by MTV
Best in Fashion, Beauty and Luxury	All Things Hair - Big Hair Meets Big Data produced by Weber Shandwick for Unilever
Best in Film	Devil Baby Attack produced by Thinkmodo
Best in Financial Services	#TDThanksYou produced by Diamond Integrated Marketing
Best in Food & Beverage	Arby's Pop Culture Hat Trick produced by Agency: Edelman; Client: Arby's Restaurant Group, Inc. (ARG)
Best in Games	EA Sports Madden GIFERATOR: A Google Art, Copy & Code Project produced by EA Sports / Grow / Heat / Google Creative Partnerships
Best in Government & Politics	NASA Social Media produced by NASA & The Story of Jokowi's Impromptu Walkabout Campaign produced by BERAKAR KOMUNIKASI
Best in Health & Fitness	Google Glass Helped Kids in Hospital Visit Zoo produced by Memorial Hermann Health System & The Houston Zoo
Best in Home & Decor	Ikea hej produced by Agency: Razorfish Germany, Client: IKEA Deutschland, Partners: Bright Solutions GmbH, Floorplanner
Best in Hospitality	Meet Me at Starbucks produced by 72andSunny, m ss ng p eces, Co.MISSION, Ideas United
Best in Music	Kings of Leon & NachoVision produced by Phear Creative
Best in News	#Tiananmen89 produced by BBC World Service and BBC Chinese
Best in Retail & E-Commerce	Best Buy Hinting Season produced by Best Buy, CP+B, PLUS Productions, Starcom USA
Best in Sports	adidas Brazuca produced by We Are Social
Best in Technology	Live From Space produced by Mullen, National Geographic
Best in Television	BoJack Horseman produced by Netflix and Ignition
Best in Tourism	Travel Wisconsin's #BragBadge Social Listening Campaign produced by The Wisconsin Department of Tourism and Laughlin Constable
Best in Travel	Happiest Travel Day produced by Mullen
Best in Wine, Beer & Spirits	Friends Are Waiting produced by Momentum Worldwide, Anheuser Busch

==== By Platform ====
Category	Winner
Best on Twitter	@NBAOfficial Instant Replay on Twitter produced by NBA Social Media
Best on Vine	Lowe's Vine TapThru produced by BBDO New York
Best on Instagram	GoPro produced by GoPro & Thrown Back Thursdays produced by Expedia, 180LA
Best on Snapchat	The Maze Runner: #SurviveTheNight produced by VaynerMedia, FOX Home Entertainment
Best on Tumblr	HBO's "Beautiful Death" Countdown for 'Game of Thrones' produced by HBO & 360i
Best on YouTube	GoPro: Best on YouTube produced by GoPro Media
Best on LinkedIn	Wells Fargo produced by Enterprise Social Media

==== By Campaign ====
Category	Winner
Best Twitter Campaign	The Bench produced by Renegade & Leo Burnett Detroit
Best Facebook Campaign	Lidl Fan Cup / Play online. Shoot offline. produced by MRM//McCANN
Best Multi-Platform Campaign	Project Architeuthis produced by Agency of Record: Lowe Campbell Ewald, Client: Navy, Vendor: Puzzability
Best Tumblr Campaign	Starbucks Pumpkin Spice Latte Fall 2014 produced by Swift + Starbucks
Best Social Good Campaign	Humane Society Silicon Valley presents Eddie the Terrible produced by Humane Society Silicon Valley
Best Ambassador & Celebrity Campaign	Sphero & Zach Braff / Wish I Was Here Holiday Engagement produced by Sphero, Zach Braff, Wish I Was Here, Topspin Media

==== Innovative Technology ====
Category	Winner
Best Integration with Live Television	NFL Total Access Social Experiencen produced by NFL Network/NFL Media Group
Best Mobile App	Ken Burns, the Definitive American History App produced by Big Spaceship & WE THE ECONOMY 20 Short Films You Can't Afford to Miss produced by Vulcan Productions and Cinelan
Most Creative Use of Technology	Wake Up & Smell The Bacon produced by Kraft Foods/ Oscar Mayer, 360i, Olson Engage, Starcom MediaVest Group, Dirty Robber
Best Use of Gamification	Project Architeuthis produced by Agency of Record: Lowe Campbell Ewald, Client: Navy, Vendor: Puzzability
Best Social Media Tool	American Red Cross & Bitly - Hope.ly produced by BBDO New York

==== Content and Media ====
Category	Winner
Best Contest or Promotion	Foot Locker Horse With Harden produced by BBDO New York & #iamheretotakeyourjob Intern Draft produced by Havas Worldwide Chicago
Best Data Visualization	Trulia's 25 Most Appetizing Cities for Zombies produced by Trulia, Olson Engage, and The Vyater Group
Best Use of a Hashtag	#PutACanOnIt produced by Red Bull Media House
Best Use of Video	Proud to Play produced by 72andSunny, Google, YouTube
Best Use of Humor	Devil Baby Attack produced by Thinkmodo
Best Use of a Meme	EA Sports Madden GIFERATOR: A Google Art, Copy & Code Project produced by EA Sports / Grow / Heat / Google Creative Partnerships
Best Use of an Animated GIFs	EA Sports Madden GIFERATOR: A Google Art, Copy & Code Project produced by EA Sports / Grow / Heat / Google Creative Partnerships
Best Photography and Graphics	First Ever Selfie with Jesus produced by The Flash Pack
Best Real-Time Responso	Sold! Nissan Purchases 1996 Maxima from Brilliant Craigslist Ad produced by Nissan and Zocalo Group
Best IRL Activation	#TDThanksYou produced by Diamond Integrated Marketing

==== Prestige Awards ====
Category	Winner
Best Small Business	Casper: Bedtime is Back produced by Casper
Best Large Business	FedEx Delivers More Than Packages produced by FedEx Services
Best Small Agency	breensmith
Best Mid-Size Agency	Big Spaceship
Best Large Agency	VaynerMedia
