= Mario (goose) =

Toulouse goose in Echo Park, Los Angeles (2010–2018)

Mario was a male Toulouse goose (Anser anser), formerly living in Echo Park, Los Angeles who became the subject of news reports in 2011 after forming an unusual association with a local resident, Dominic Ehrler.

Mario, who was originally named Maria by locals and assumed to be female, was familiar to users of the park for several years as a goose which preferred the company of humans to that of its own species, often pecking at homeless people or following walkers and runners around.

Ehrler, a retired salesman, first encountered Mario at Echo Park Lake in the summer of 2010 when the bird began to follow him on his daily walks around the lake, readily accepting food from him and soon becoming so attached that he would wait beside the road every morning for Ehrler to arrive at the park. Mario would walk alongside and possessively 'protect' Ehrler from other park users and their dogs and would also attempt to follow him from the park, flying closely behind him as he rode away on his scooter, necessitating attempts to distract the goose, or lock him behind a fence when leaving, to avoid being followed all the way home.

Mario, along with the other geese present at Echo Park were temporarily relocated to Los Angeles Zoo in April 2011 and placed into quarantine, as the park underwent restoration and the lake was drained. It was at this time that veterinarians at the zoo discovered that the goose was male (a gander), leading to him being given the name Mario. Zoo officials stated their plans to house Mario at a children's zoo, though it was also suggested that the Echo Park geese would be relocated to another lake. Ehrler continued to visit Mario at the zoo and stated his intention to maintain the friendship and follow the gander to his new home, also raising the possibility of moving to Oregon with him. Later, plans were put forward to have Mario live at the zoo after the Echo Park lake refurbishing was completed, as it was a safer place for him to live.

Mario also appeared in the 2010 music video for the song "End Love" by the rock band OK Go, which has received over 15 million views on YouTube. Dubbed "Orange Bill" by the band and production crew, they allowed the goose to appear prominently in the video after he bit guitarist Andy Ross during filming at the park.

Mario died of old age in his sleep on 29 June 2018 at his home, the Los Angeles Zoo. The zoo released a statement saying, "The Los Angeles Zoo is sad to announce the passing of the celebrity, domestic Toulouse goose, Mario. The nine-year-old goose resided at the Winnick Family Children's Zoo for the last seven years until his passing on Friday, June 29 due to old age. Mario was an animal that brought joy to many Angelenos, and he will be missed."

== See also ==
- List of individual birds
- List of wild animals from Los Angeles
