= You're Not Alone (OK Go and Bonerama EP) =

EP by OK Go and Bonerama
- Released: February 5, 2008
- Recorded: August 2007
- Genre: Rock; funk
- Length: 18:43
- Label: Capitol
- Producer: Damian Kulash; Mark Nevers

OK Go chronology
Oh No (2005)	You're Not Alone (2008)	Of the Blue Colour of the Sky (2010)

Bonerama chronology
Bringing It Home (2007)	You're Not Alone (2008)	Shake It Baby (2013)

You're Not Alone is an EP by American rock band OK Go and brass funk rock band Bonerama, released on February 5, 2008. It was recorded to raise money for New Orleans musicians displaced in 2005 by Hurricane Katrina, with the proceeds being split between Sweet Home New Orleans and a fund for a new house for New Orleans musician Al "Carnival Time" Johnson, who sings on the last track of the EP. It was only released as a download on Amazon MP3 and the iTunes Store, who have agreed to donate the full sale price to the cause.

The EP was recorded in August 2007 in New Orleans, Bonerama's home city. The first track is a cover of "Rock 'n' Roll Suicide" by David Bowie and the last track a cover of Bob Dylan's "I Shall Be Released", in which Johnson performs the lead vocals. The remaining three are arrangements of songs from OK Go's album Oh No, performed together by OK Go and Bonerama.

== Track listing ==
1. "Rock 'n' Roll Suicide" – 3:19
2. "A Million Ways" – 3:52
3. "Oh Lately It's So Quiet" – 3:21
4. "It's a Disaster" – 3:35
5. "I Shall Be Released" – 4:36
