= Brett Doar =

American artist

Brett Doar is an American contraptionist known for building Rube Goldberg machines and other interactive and kinetic devices. Doar is best known for his roles as a primary engineer for the Rube Goldberg machine in OK Go's "This Too Shall Pass" music video, lead engineer and creative director for "Red Bull Kluge," and creator of GoldieBlox's "Princess Machine". He lives and works in Los Angeles, CA.

== Early life and education ==
Doar was born in Cambridge, Massachusetts and was raised in Charlotte, NC. As an undergraduate he studied architecture, linguistics, literature and screenwriting at 4 universities before earning his B.A. from New School University in New York City. He earned an M.F.A. from the Arts, Computation and Engineering program at UC Irvine in 2009. He has worked as a commercial fisherman in the Bering Sea, a bus driver, a film and video editor, and a teacher at the preschool, middle school and university level.

== Work ==
Doar was a primary engineer of the Rube Goldberg machine for OK Go's "This Too Shall Pass" music video, which premiered on YouTube on March 2, 2010 and achieved over 6 million views within six days. Following the viral success of this music video, Doar built a Rube Goldberg machine for The Colbert Report which was set off by Stephen Colbert in front of a live audience to coincide with OK Go's performance on the show on April 29, 2010.

In 2013, Doar created the "Princess Machine" that was featured in an ad for GoldieBlox. The ad launched on YouTube in November 2013 and garnered over 8 million views in 4 days.

In 2014, Doar created the machine used in the promotional trailer for the Android release of the mobile video game, Leo's Fortune.
