= Do What You Want (OK Go song) =

Single by OK Go

from the album Oh No
- B-side: "Oh Lately It's So Quiet" (Acoustic version); "Get Over It" (Live version); "Invincible" (Live version)
- Released: April 3, 2006
- Recorded: 2004–2005
- Length: 3:05
- Label: Capitol
- Songwriters: Damian Kulash; Tim Nordwind
- Producer: Tore Johansson

OK Go singles chronology
"A Million Ways" (2006)	"Do What You Want" (2006)	"Oh Lately It's So Quiet" (2006)

"Do What You Want" is a song by American rock band OK Go from their second album, Oh No. It is the second single off the album released in the UK (in the US, the song was released as an EP prior to the album's release).

The b-sides include live versions of "Get Over It" and "Invincible" as well as an acoustic version of "Oh Lately It's So Quiet".

== Music video ==
=== "Party version" ===
A first video was made in June 2005 in Los Angeles, California. Directed by Olivier Gondry (brother of director Michel Gondry), this video depicts the band performing the song, "at a fancy dandy party where people are drunk and dancing and having a great time", while the camera is going around the band and the crowd and stopping in different places in rapid motion. A total of thirty-five DV cameras, set up by Gondry and his crew, were used to achieve the desired panning effects.

=== "Tour version" ===
Another video was released through the band's website only available to their "Juggling Club" members. This features live performances interspliced with the band lip-syncing the song in various parts. This was directed by Scott Keiner and was probably made in late 2005 or early 2006 during the band's tour.

=== "Wallpaper version" ===
A third video was made to promote the single release. This version is known as the "Wallpaper version", as it has the band and a large group of extras (described as "a large contingent of Los Angeles' most talented weirdos") in zentai-styled bodysuits that match the wallpaper on the wall of the set in which the video is filmed. Co-directed by frontman Damian Kulash, Mary Fagot, and James Frost, it is perhaps the most well-known music video for the song. The video was premiered on MTV's Total Request Live on February 15, 2007 with all day premieres on MTVu and MTV Hits.

== In other media ==
- The song was played in a commercial for the Fox show Back to You, starring Kelsey Grammer and Patricia Heaton.
- The song was featured in a JCPenney commercial.
- The song is on the soundtrack for the game NHL 2006.
- The song is on the soundtrack for the game Thrillville: Off the Rails.
- The song has been featured in several video games, including Burnout Revenge, Burnout Legends, Guitar Hero: On Tour, and was released as downloadable content for the Guitar Hero series.
- The song is featured as a special feature on the DVD for the film Juno where the cast and crew dance and pantomime playing instruments.
- The song was featured in commercials for the movie Space Chimps.
- The song is played on the AT&T website on a display for quick messaging cell phones.
- The song was featured in a commercial for Comcast Xfinity.
- The song was covered by Nataly Dawn on her channel on YouTube.
