= This Is a Generic Brand Video =

- Still from beginning of video
- Release date: March 21, 2014
- Running time: 2 minutes 49 seconds

This Is a Generic Brand Video was an advertising video created by Dissolve, written by Kendra Eash on McSweeney's, and narrated by Dallas McClain.

Described as a hilarious ad poem that is "every cliché that ever was."

"Using a specific ratio of Asian people to black people to women to white men, we want to make sure we represent your needs and interests – or at least a version of your skin colour – in our ads."

This comedic video parodied the advertising industry and its commercial clichés while advertising its own company as a new entrant in the stock footage market.

== Reaction ==
This video won the 2015 Shorty Award for Best in B2B and was nominated for the 2016 Webby Awards.

Dissolve website visitors increased by 9x the week the video launched while user signups and revenue also increased by 6x.

As of February 27, 2026, it has over 2.9 million views on YouTube and 660,000 views on Vimeo.

The video also received wide online media coverage from magazines and news article websites.

AdAge reported this brand video as "tragically funny" while Fast Company labeled it "The Greatest Thing About The Absolute Worst In Advertising".

Time commented that the video covered all the advertising trends in under three minutes.

Other media sites such as Adweek, Vanity Fair, Forbes, and The Globe and Mail all shared this video.

== Other videos ==
This Is a Generic Presidential Campaign Ad - A fake presidential campaign ad that poked fun at the election that made the 2016 Shorty Award Finalist.

This is a Generic Millennial Ad - A millennial version of This Is a Generic Brand Video created in collaboration with And/Or studio that shows how easy it is to appeal to anyone born between 1980 and 2000.
