= Andy Ross =

American musician

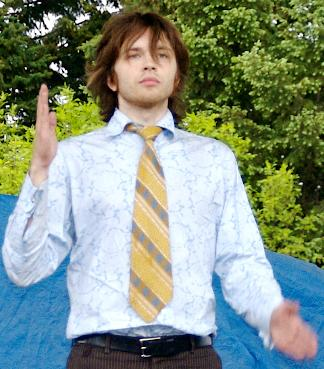
- Ross in concert at the Albany Tulip Festival (May 2006)

Background information
- Born: Andrew Bryant Ross
- Origin: Worcester, Massachusetts, U.S.
- Genres: Alternative rock; pop rock; indie rock; indie pop; electronica
- Occupations: Musician; singer; songwriter; record producer
- Instruments: Vocals; guitar; keyboards; bass guitar
- Years active: 1998–present
- Member of: OK Go; Secret Dakota Ring
- Formerly of: Unsacred Hearts; DraculaZombieUSA; Cold Memory; Phter; Conjugal Visit

Andrew Bryant Ross is an American musician who has been the guitarist and keyboardist for the rock band OK Go since 2005. He is also behind a solo project, Secret Dakota Ring, which released albums in 2004 and 2008. Ross is also co-founder of Serious Business Records, a label under which Secret Dakota Ring publish their records.

== Biography ==
Ross attended Mass Academy, then Columbia University, where he studied computer science in the engineering school, and became the bassist for the band Unsacred Hearts and guitarist for DraculaZombieUSA. Ross was also the bassist for a brief stint in early 2000s indie band Cold Memory, and was also the headliner for The A-Ross Experience. Other early bands include Phter and Conjugal Visit.

In 2004, he released an album, Do Not Leave The Baggage All the Way, under his solo project Secret Dakota Ring. Ross described his freshman album as a "breakup album" at a Google artists performance.

In early 2005, Ross became a member of OK Go after auditioning to replace the band's then-guitarist and keyboardist Andy Duncan, who left after production on their second album, Oh No, was finished.

A second Secret Dakota Ring album, entitled Cantarell, was released on November 11, 2008.

== Discography ==
=== Studio albums ===
==== with Secret Dakota Ring ====
- Do Not Leave Baggage All the Way (2004)
- Cantarell (2008)

==== with OK Go ====
- Of the Blue Colour of the Sky (2010)
- Hungry Ghosts (2014)
- And the Adjacent Possible (2025)
