= End Love =

Single by OK Go

from the album Of the Blue Colour of the Sky
- Released: June 14, 2010
- Recorded: 2009
- Genre: Synth-pop; indie pop; electropop; pop rock; funk
- Length: 4:05
- Label: Paracadute Recordings
- Songwriters: Damian Kulash; Tim Nordwind
- Producer: Dave Fridmann

OK Go singles chronology
| "This Too Shall Pass" (2010) | "End Love" (2010) | "White Knuckles" (2010) |

"End Love" is a song by alternative rock band OK Go from the album Of the Blue Colour of the Sky. The song's lyrics deal with the sorrowful period of time after the end of a relationship. The video for the song features the band performing over a continuous 18-hour shot along with nearly 200 hours of additional footage, with both time-lapse compression and expansion used to condense the footage to a four-minute video.

== Music video ==
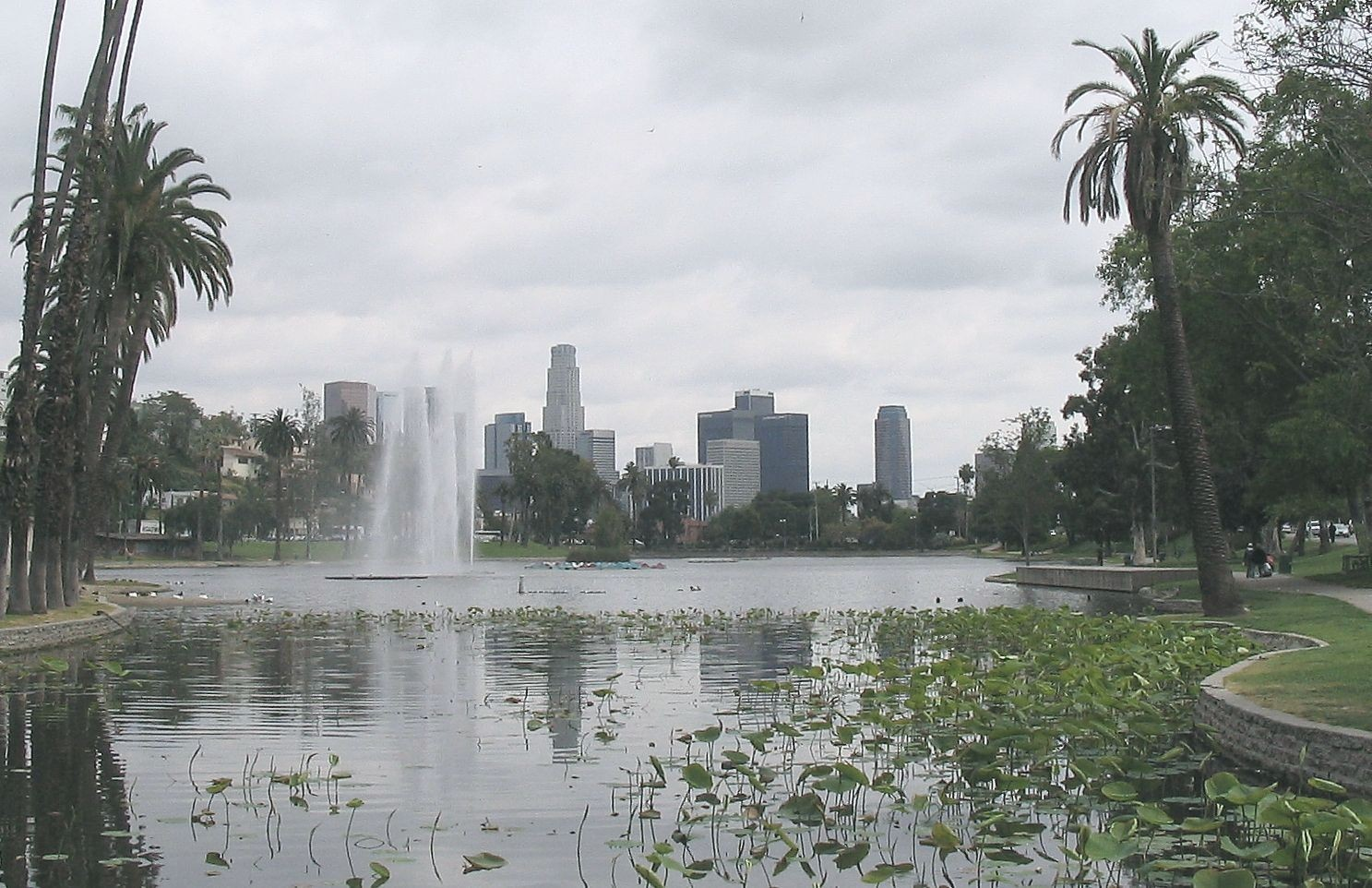
"End Love" was filmed around Echo Park Lake in Los Angeles.

The video for "End Love" was co-directed by Damian Kulash, Jeff Lieberman, and Eric Gunther, and was filmed at Echo Park, around Echo Park Lake, in Los Angeles on March 28, 2010. The video shows the four members of OK Go, each dressed in solid neon-tracksuit of different colors, performing moves to the song. The band performed these moves using time-lapse photography to create certain special effects, such as appearing to move without walking, to move between two different points rapidly, or to play on the colors of their tracksuits in combination with these effects. In addition, some parts of the video have been significantly slowed down as the members of the band perform a move in unison. The band performed their parts over an 18-hour period including overnight; in one segment, the band members use sleeping bags to sleep, with each member taking a turn "singing" parts of the lyrics over the night. Near the end of the video, the band begins interacting with other people in the same manner. The video concludes with time-lapse photography of the fountain at Echo Park and the Los Angeles skyline that covers nearly eight additional days.

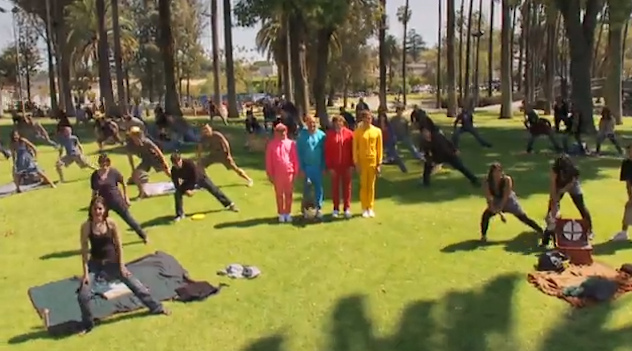
The members of OK Go (in the bright color sweatsuits) among several extras in the "End Love" music video.

According to Lieberman, the video—including both the band's main performance and the skyline shots—was filmed in a continuous shot consisting of over one million frames of film. The average time compression on the video for most of OK Go's parts is about 270x from real-time, while the slowed down segments were 32 times slower than real-time. The skyline footage was compressed by 172,800 times, condensing each 24 hours into a 0.5 second shot.

During the video, a singular goose is frequently seen wandering near the band, unperturbed by their performance. The goose is known to park regulars as Mario, though the band and production crew dubbed it "Orange Bill". The goose was initially territorial towards the band during the initial practice a few days before the full shoot, but eventually came to "adopt" the band, and stayed with the four during much of the video.

The video premiered at the Bonnaroo Music & Arts Festival on June 12, 2010, and was then released on YouTube on June 15, 2010. OK Go, now on their own label, Paracadute Recordings, after previous difficulties with EMI and Capitol Records for the "This Too Shall Pass" video, also released the video for free download through their website, along with a contest for viewers to win a free iPad that included OK Go's full video and discography to date.
