= Do What You Like =

Do What You Like may refer to:

- "Do What U Like", a 1991 song by Take That
- "Doowutchyalike", a 1989 song by Digital Underground
- "Do What You Like", a song by Foreigner from their 1979 album Head Games
- "Do What You Like", a song by Blind Faith, from their 1969 album Blind Faith
- "Do What You Like", a 2000 song by French Affair
- "Do What You Like" (Taio Cruz song), 2015

== See also ==
- Do What You Want (disambiguation)
