= Debbie Sterling =

American engineer, businesswoman

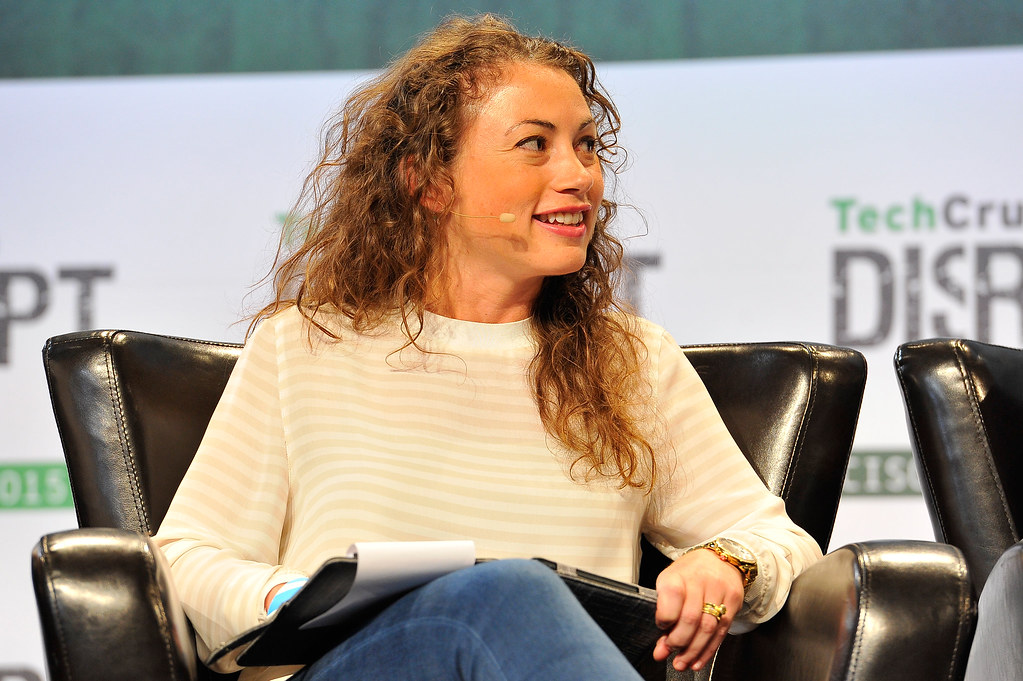
- Debbie Sterling on September 21, 2015 judging Startup Battlefield at Day 1 of TechCrunch in San Francisco, California.
- Born: February 26, 1983 (age 43); Los Angeles, California, U.S.
- Education: Stanford University
- Occupations: Engineer, businesswoman
- Known for: Founder of GoldieBlox
- Relatives: Amy Sterling Casil (aunt); Sterling Sturtevant (grandmother)

Debbie Sterling (born February 26, 1983) is an American engineer, businesswoman and the founder and CEO of GoldieBlox. Sterling is an engineer, spokesperson, and advocate for women in engineering and technology. Sterling was named Time's Person of the Moment and Business Insider's 30 Women Who Are Changing the World. GoldieBlox was named one of the World's Most Innovative Companies by Fast Company in 2014. The Toy Industry Association awarded GoldieBlox the 2014 Educational Toy of the Year.

== Early life and education ==
Sterling was born in Los Angeles, California on February 26, 1983. Her grandmother, Sterling Sturtevant, was an Academy Award-winning art director for animated films who worked for Walt Disney, Playhouse Pictures, UPA and Charles Schulz; science fiction author Amy Sterling Casil is her aunt. As a child, Sterling spent her time playing with princesses, ponies and dressing up, but also developed an interest in engineering. She allegedly found appeal in combining skills in art, design, mechanics and physics in order to tackle and solve complex problems. Sterling subsequently pursued a bachelor's degree in mechanical engineering from Stanford University, graduating in 2005.

== Career ==
After graduating from Stanford University, Sterling moved to Seattle and took a job as an intern at design agency Hornall Anderson. She was offered full-time employment by the company a few months after. Within 3 years, Sterling had moved up to be the lead brand strategist on the New York Knicks re-brand. While Sterling has stated that she enjoyed the work, she wanted to contribute to the world in a more meaningful way, spending time volunteering at various organizations such as the Peace Corps. Sterling spent six months volunteering in India, and cites this time as one of the most influential in her life. Following her time in India, she pursued a job in jewelry making in 2009.

== GoldieBlox ==
While hosting a once monthly "Idea Brunch", the idea for GoldieBlox emerged from a discussion about the lack of women in engineering. Having spent time working in branding, marketing and jewelry making, Sterling was well prepared to found GoldieBlox – a company that focuses STEM education, specifically engineering, to young girls with a new construction toy destined with girls in mind. Initial criticisms of the company targeted at her product were that construction toys would never catch on, and that "fighting nature" was no good – construction toys were meant to be for boys, and dolls for girls, as Sterling discussed in a 2017 Forbes interview. Years of research concluded this was incorrect, and she pursued the concept. After initially trying to gain support for GoldieBlox at a New York toy fair, Sterling launched a Kickstarter campaign that raised nearly $300,000.

Since then, GoldieBlox found success, selling over a million toys and racking up a million downloads on the app store, as of late 2017. GoldieBlox has been featured in traditional brick and mortar retail stores such as Walmart, Target, and Toys R Us, online at Amazon, along with featuring a Super Bowl commercial that aired during the 2014 game. GoldieBlox expanded into puzzle books in 2017, after feedback from users suggested interest in the product. Sterling successfully worked with the Girl Scouts of the USA to include new badges in STEM fields, with the stated goal of getting girls to think about inventing and engineering.
