= This Too Shall Pass (OK Go song) =

Single by OK Go

from the album Of the Blue Colour of the Sky
- Released: January 17, 2010
- Recorded: October 2008 – June 2009
- Studio: Tarbox Road (Cassadaga, New York)
- Genre: Power pop; indie pop; alternative rock
- Length: 3:08
- Label: Capitol; EMI
- Songwriters: Damian Kulash; Tim Nordwind
- Producer: Dave Fridmann

OK Go singles chronology
"WTF?" (2009)	"This Too Shall Pass" (2010)	"End Love" (2010)

"This Too Shall Pass" is a song by American rock band OK Go. It was released as the second single from their third studio album, Of the Blue Colour of the Sky, in January 2010. The band took the unorthodox route of creating two official music videos for the song, both of which premiered on YouTube. The first features a live performance of the song in collaboration with the University of Notre Dame Marching Band. The second features a giant Rube Goldberg machine, constructed to operate in time with the song. The popularity of the second music video of the song has been compared to that of the band's video for "Here It Goes Again", helping to boost live performances and single song sales for the group but not significantly improving sales of the Colour album. Difficulties with EMI, their corporate label, in marketing and distribution of the videos led the band to form their own independent label shortly after the videos' releases.

== Song ==
The lyrics to "This Too Shall Pass" are written to encourage its audience, burdened with some figurative weight, to "let it go, this too shall pass" in the near future instead of continuing to let the weight keep them from enjoying life, akin to the meaning of the original phrase, This too shall pass. The song continues much of the theme of Of the Blue Colour of the Sky, which, according to Damian Kulash, was about "searching for hope in hopeless times"; "This Too Shall Pass" and other songs from the album were written at the onset of the late-2000s recession. Billboard considered the song to be a "psych-pop anthem", similar to MGMT's "Kids"; this is in part due to the album's producer Dave Fridmann who had also worked with MGMT and The Flaming Lips and brought some of the same musical stylings along.

== First music video: marching band ==
The first video for the song was released on YouTube, on January 12, 2010, to coincide with the release of the album and the single. Co-directed by Damian Kulash and Brian L. Perkins, it was filmed in October, 2009, in South Bend, Indiana. The video is somewhat unusual in that it does not feature the album version of the song. Rather, it features an original recording that was actually performed live during filming of the video. OK Go's Tim Nordwind noted that the song lent itself well to large orchestration.

In the video, the members of OK Go are seen in a field wearing marching band garb. The uniforms were originally from Rochelle Township High School of Rochelle, Illinois. They begin to march and, as the song progresses, the band is joined by members of the University of Notre Dame's Marching Band many of whom rise up camouflaged in ghillie suits. They are also joined in the final chorus by a children's choir cobbled together from two local South Bend preschools. Like many of their other videos, the marching band video was shot in one take.

The marching band video was created to bridge the time between the release of the album and the expected completion of the Rube Goldberg video. The band had originally planned to release the marching band version after the debut of the Rube Goldberg video. However, they found time during October 2009 to work with the Notre Dame band, and realizing the length of time to complete the Rube Goldberg machine, went ahead and completed the marching band version.

== Second music video: Rube Goldberg machine ==
The second music video for "This Too Shall Pass" was co-directed by Damian Kulash and James Frost. Similar to the band's video for "Here It Goes Again", the "This Too Shall Pass" video features a four-minute, apparent one shot sequence of the song being played in time to the actions of a giant Rube Goldberg machine built in a two-story warehouse from over 700 household objects, traversing an estimated half-mile course. As the song and machine operate, the members of the band are seen singing alongside the machine, with the members being shot at by paint guns at the song's finale. Parts of the machine are synchronized in time with the music; in one instance, glasses of water are used to repeat part of the song's melody in the fashion of a glass harp. One part of the machine shows the "Here It Goes Again" video on a television before it is smashed by the machine. The MAKE magazine 1993 Ford Escort racecar, used for the 24 Hours of LeMons, appears in the video along with a miniature LEGO version of the car. Alongside the LEGO car, several LEGO mini-figurines are displayed as a reference to the marching band video.

=== Creation ===
The floor plan for the Rube Goldberg machine used in the video covered two floors of a warehouse and had several distinct stations that worked in time with the music.

The video's inspiration was from the band, who wanted "a giant machine that we dance with", a long-term aspiration of the band and inspired by other Rube Goldberg machines shown in videos on YouTube, including the interstitials used on the Japanese children's show PythagoraSwitch. While they considered the idea of the machine for each song on Of the Colour, they opted to use "This Too Shall Pass" to make the end result "majestic and epic", even though it already duplicated the previous marching band video. They sought help through online science message boards, eventually coming in contact with Syyn Labs. From a pool of talent at a Syyn Labs-hosted "Mindshare LA" gathering, about 55 to 60 people from Syyn Labs, the California Institute of Technology (including some who work at the National Aeronautics and Space Administration's Jet Propulsion Laboratory and participated in the Mars Exploration Rover program, hence the model rover seen in the video) and MIT Media Lab helped to design and construct the machine. Damian Kulash's father (Damian Kulash Sr.) also participated in the machine's construction.

The team had to work on a limited budget, using recycled trash for many of the props in the device; after filming, the total estimated cost was approximately $90,000. The team avoided the use of "magic"—automated devices like computers or motors—and instead focused on purely physical devices. The total time to create the video from conceptualization was about six months, with two months of planning and four months for design and filming. The warehouse where filming took place was in the Echo Park section of Los Angeles, and was secured by Syyn Labs in November 2009. The final construction within the warehouse took over a month and a half during January and February 2010. The band members helped in the last two weeks of construction, having spent the previous four months on tour.

Once the machine was completed, the filming, using a single Steadicam, took two days to complete on February 11 and 12, with an estimated 60 takes for the machine to properly function. The first day of filming included 47 takes, none of which successfully completed the entire machine and necessitated a second day of filming. Many of the takes ended only 30 seconds into the process, at the start of the song's chorus, where a tire would fail to roll properly into the next section of the machine. Syyn Labs had a group of 30 people to help reset the machine after each failed take, a process that took upwards of an hour depending on how far the machine ran. There were no significant injuries during filming; Tim Nordwind once was hit hard with paint at the end, while the Steadicam operator nearly got hit with one of the barrels at the end of the mechanism in the shot used for the final video. His reaction may be seen in the released version of the video.

Several elements of the machine had to be properly adjusted to match the timing for the song. The group broke the song into sections, triggered when the machine passed certain gates, to account for small changes in timing that could occur (up to 0.5 sec, according to Brett Doar, one of the machine's chief designers), allowing the band to continue to lip synch while the machine operated. Smaller objects like dominoes were found to be the trickiest to set, as their patterns would be less predictable than larger and bulkier objects, which are more predominant in the later parts of the machine. Once the machine transitioned to the downstairs portion, it would generally run the rest of the course untouched. Furthermore, the time of day and temperature would play a big factor in how some small components would behave, forcing the team to readjust the timing. Ball tracks and other features had to be wiped clear of dust and debris to prevent slowing down rolling objects. A carved wooden ball track shown early in the video was created to have motions timed to the music, but required a low inclined angle that would often cause the balls to skip out of the tracks.

Kulash noted that their largest "nightmare" for the machine was a set of mousetraps, triggered to release a display of colored flags; they were found to be overly sensitive to earlier actions of the machine, such as the dropping of a piano, and redesign and padding were needed to prevent the traps from being set off prematurely. The timing had to take into account the movements of both the band members and the cameraman; Kulash estimated that though the machine was able to complete its opening at least three times, these shots were botched, because either the band members or the cameraman had fallen behind the action of the machine.

While the video was filmed as a single shot on at least three different occasions, they planned on using post-editing to slow down or speed up certain parts of the take to keep it in time with the final soundtrack. There is a noted cut in the video, in which the camera passes through a set of curtains on the transition to the downstairs portion of the machine; according to one of the machine designers, Hector Alvarez, this cut was introduced by the band, speculating it was introduced to avoid a shot of one of the band members or cameraman in frame or otherwise to keep the machine video synchronized to the machine. Both Tim Nordwind, bassist for the band, and Adam Sadowsky, president of Syyn Labs, said that while the machine worked in its entirety 3 times, and no cut was needed, the decision was made so a better result on the downstairs portion could be included in the final version. There was also a second cut which can be noticed by watching a piano against a wall as the camera passed behind some rods; the piano can be seen apparently warping in shape and position.

== Responses ==
The Rube Goldberg machine video premiered on YouTube on March 2, 2010. Within a day of the video's premiere, it was viewed more than 900,000 times. The video achieved 6 million views within six days, which was comparable to the popularity of the "Here It Goes Again" video, and was considered "instantly viral" by CNN. The video had more than 10 million views in its first month of release. As part of the success of both videos, the band has begun auctioning props from the videos, including uniforms worn by the band for the marching band video and the individual ping-pong balls from the second video. The Rube Goldberg video was included in a shortlist of 125 entries out of 23,000 for inclusion in "YouTube Play: A Biennial of Creative Video", a showcase of the best user-created videos from YouTube in conjunction with the Guggenheim Museums, but ultimately was not selected as one of the 25 winning videos.

Despite the success of the videos on the Internet, this has not translated into sales for the album Of the Blue Colour of the Sky which the song is a part of, selling only 40,000 copies in the two months after its January release. Part of this is attributed to the "unremarkable" music on the album and for the video; musician Max Tundra suggested that the band should "record an innovative, exciting piece of music – and make a plodding, nondescript video to go with it." However, ticket sales for OK Go concerts have seen a surge since the video's release, as well as sales of digital downloads of the song through services like iTunes. According to Nordwind, the band is not concerned with album sales, as their successes have come from "untraditional ways" through the band's career. Kulash has stated that with the continued success of their music videos as viral videos as was the case for "This Too Shall Pass", the band has seen more touring opportunities and an expanded audience they don't believe they would have gotten with more traditional videos under corporate label control. This has led OK Go to "look at making videos like [they] look at making records — it's part of the art of what [they] do", according to Nordwind. In part of the success of "This Too Shall Pass" and their previous videos, OK Go won the 14th Annual Webby Special Achievement Award for Film and Video Artist of the Year. The video was named both "Video of the Year" and "Best Rock Video" at the 3rd annual UK Music Video Awards.

In May 2010, after the band split with EMI, the single debuted at number 39 on the Billboard Alternative Songs chart, their first appearance on the chart since "Here It Goes Again" in 2006. The song eventually peaked at number 36.

At the time of the creation of the video, Syyn Labs had just been formed; the viral success of "This Too Shall Pass" brought the company to light for several similar creative projects involving the innovative combination of technology. When OK Go appeared on The Colbert Report on April 29, 2010 in which they performed "This Too Shall Pass", Stephen Colbert opened the show with another, shorter Rube Goldberg machine created by Syyn Lab's Brett Doar, one of the chief creators of the "This Too Shall Pass" music video, using assorted props from the show. Syyn Labs have since created advertisements for Disney and Sears, and have been contacted for future work in music videos and movie opening sequences, and are considering a reality television show based on their creative process.

In February 2011, music video blog Yes, We've Got a Video! ranked both the marching band video and the Rube Goldberg machine video at number 3 in their top 30 videos of 2010. The latter in particular was praised for "the cleverness of it and the fact that you could always pick up something new upon each and every view." The Song was also used as the theme for the American remake of British sitcom, The Inbetweeners.

== Difficulties with EMI ==
The marching band video sparked much controversy online immediately after its release. Because of deals between the band's label, EMI (through Capitol Records), and YouTube, the video was not embeddable, nor was it viewable across the globe, frustrating many fans and music industry professionals who wanted to post the video on their blogs. The band, led by singer Damian Kulash, explained the label's rationale via the band's blog and through an op-ed piece in The New York Times. According to Kulash, EMI disallowed the embeddable play of the video because they only receive royalties for views on the YouTube site itself. He further pleaded to allow embedding of their next video, citing a 90% drop in viewership when EMI disabled embedding on existing videos, affecting the band's own royalties from viewership.

The band was able to secure the rights to allow the "This Too Shall Pass" Rube Goldberg video to be distributed via embedding prior to its premiere, in part due to funding support from State Farm Insurance, which helped to settle issues with EMI; in exchange, State Farm had some say in the creative process, and the video includes elements with the State Farm logo, including a toy truck that is used to start the machine. The video was completed a week later than expected; according to sources close to the band, Capitol Records considered the window of opportunity for promoting the single to radio to be closed due to the delay, and would not be available again until June 2010. The band has since decided to break away from the EMI label on amiable terms, due to a combination of the issues of video embedding and radio promotions, and has become its own independent recording label, Paracadute Recordings.

== Track listings ==
=== CD single ===
1. This Too Shall Pass
2. This Too Shall Pass (Instrumental)
3. This Too Shall Pass (Sunday Hangover Passion Pit Remix)

=== CD Remix EP ===
1. This Too Shall Pass (Passion Pit Remix)
2. This Too Shall Pass (Shoes Remix)
3. This Too Shall Pass (Ra Ra Riot Remix)
4. This Too Shall Pass (J. Arthur Keenes Band Remix)
5. This Too Shall Pass (Album Version)
6. End Love (Neil Voss Remix)
7. End Love (Subtractive Remix)
8. End Love (Album Version)

== Charts ==
Chart performance for "This Too Shall Pass"
Chart (2010)	Peak position
Australia (ARIA)	97
US Alternative Airplay (Billboard)	39
