= Don't Ask Me (OK Go song) =

Single by OK Go

from the album OK Go
- B-side: "It's Tough to Have a Crush", "Get over It" (BBC Radio 1 Session)
- Released: June 16, 2003
- Genre: Alternative rock
- Length: 2:46
- Label: Capitol
- Songwriter: Damian Kulash

OK Go singles chronology
"Get Over It" (2003)	"Don't Ask Me" (2003)	"A Million Ways" (2006)

Music video
- ”Don't Ask Me” on YouTube

"Don't Ask Me" is the second single released by American rock band OK Go from their self-titled debut album (2002). It was released as a promotional single in the UK on June 16, 2003, under Capitol Records.

"It's Tough to Have a Crush" was originally released on the band's Brown EP. "Get over It (BBC Radio 1 Session)" is a live recording from BBC Radio 1 of the band's previous single, which became a hit in the UK earlier that year.

The song was featured in the 2004 film Catch That Kid and in the TV series Smallville and The Inbetweeners. It was also featured in the EA Sports video game, MVP Baseball 2003

== Track listings ==
=== UK CD single ===
1. "Don't Ask Me"
2. "Get Over It" (BBC Radio 1 Session)
3. "It's Tough To Have A Crush"

=== UK 7" single ===
1. "Don't Ask Me"
2. "It's Tough to Have a Crush"

== Music video ==
=== "Dance Booth" version ===
The first music video for the song is known as the "Dance Booth" version or "The Orange" version. It was directed by Brian L. Perkins and depicts the band and many fans in front of an orange backdrop. It was shot during their 2002 summer tour with The Vines.

=== "Black and White" version ===
A second video was made to promote the single in 2003 in the UK. This video was directed by Barnaby Roper in 2003 and features the band performing the song in an empty white room with a line of female dancers who feature prominently. The video is in monochrome save for random stripes in the background which are in either pink or orange.
