= Invincible (OK Go song) =

Single by OK Go

from the album Oh No
- Released: June 2006
- Recorded: 2004–2005
- Genre: Alternative rock; hard rock
- Length: 3:30
- Label: Capitol
- Songwriter: Damian Kulash
- Producer: Tore Johansson

OK Go singles chronology
"Oh Lately It's So Quiet" (2006)	"Invincible" (2006)	"Here It Goes Again" (2006)

"Invincible" is a single by OK Go from their Do What You Want EP and their 2005 album Oh No. It was released as a single in 2006 for US radio stations only. It was featured in the films The Fog and She's the Man and in the TV series One Tree Hill and CSI: NY.

== Track listing ==
=== U.S. promo CD single ===
1. "Invincible" (edit)
2. "Invincible" (album version)

== Music video ==
A music video was made in 2006 to promote the song. Co-directed by OK Go and Mike Barnett, it features the band performing the song in front of various wallpapers, accompanied by explosions of furniture and objects. The music video was first shown on June 14, 2006, on MySpace.
