= WTF? (song) =

Single by OK Go

from the album Of the Blue Colour of the Sky
- Released: November 10, 2009
- Genre: Funk rock; neo-psychedelia; psychedelic rock; noise pop; electronic rock
- Length: 3:24
- Label: Capitol
- Songwriter(s): Damian Kulash
- Producer(s): Dave Fridmann

OK Go singles chronology
"Here It Goes Again" (2006)	"WTF?" (2009)	"This Too Shall Pass" (2010)

"WTF?" is an alternative rock song by OK Go from their third studio album Of the Blue Colour of the Sky (2010). It was written by Damian Kulash, produced by Dave Fridmann and released as the album's first single. The song is in 5/4 time, and the band has revealed that the song was inspired by Prince.

== Track listing ==
Digital download

1. "WTF?" – 3:24
2. "WTF?" (video) – 3:31

== Music video ==
An accompanying music video was released at the same time as the single, co-directed by OK Go and Tim Nackashi. The entire video was made using a delayed image effect, and contains many psychedelic themes. All of the props in the video, such as Wiffle ball bats, gaffer tape, and beach balls, were bought from a 99 cent store. As is typical for OK Go videos, it was shot in one continuous take.
