= Oh Lately It's So Quiet =

Single by OK Go

from the album Oh No
- Released: May 2006
- Recorded: 2004–2005
- Genre: Alternative rock
- Length: 3:00
- Label: Capitol
- Songwriter: Damian Kulash
- Producer: Tore Johansson

OK Go singles chronology
"Do What You Want" (2006)	"Oh Lately It's So Quiet" (2006)	"Invincible" (2006)

"Oh Lately It's So Quiet" is the third single released by the band OK Go, from their second album Oh No. It was released for US radio stations only. An acoustic version of the song was released on the previous single in the UK, "Do What You Want". No video was produced to promote the song. It was later released as a live version on their album Live from the Fillmore – New York at Irving Plaza. The song was featured in an episode of One Tree Hill.

== Track listing ==
=== U.S. promo CD single ===
1. "Oh Lately It's So Quiet" (edit)
2. "Oh Lately It's So Quiet" (album version)
