= Burrito Project =

Charitable organization

Burrito Project is a group of friends that feeds the hungry and homeless in cities around the world, encouraging people "to get together with friends and build burritos to take to the streets". Anyone can start a Burrito Project and the organization encourages everyone to help feed the hungry in their local communities.

The first Burrito Project was The Mission Burrito Project in San Francisco, which delivered "free, organic, vegan burritos to the homeless one night a week." It was started in 1996 by Noah D and was a group effort of the local graffiti and hip hop community, primarily the ATEAM and ESL crews.

The Los Angeles Burrito Project was started by Todd Regalado. The LABP was a group of friends and volunteers who met every Wednesday to make burritos and distribute them on bicycle in Downtown Los Angeles. In December 2006, The Burrito Project won the Myspace Impact Award for poverty relief.

== See also ==
- Food Not Bombs
