= GoldieBlox =

American toy company

- Founder: Debbie Sterling

Goldie Blox toy press image

GoldieBlox is an American toy company that markets interactive toys designed for girls. GoldieBlox, which pairs a construction kit with a storybook, launched in 2012 as a prototype on Kickstarter. Its Kickstarter campaign led to more than $1 million in pre-orders placed in the first month. It went on to sell in retailers including Toys "R" Us and Amazon. None of the original construction kits or storybooks are still sold, with the company shifting its focus to crafting kits for girls.

The company was founded by Debbie Sterling, a Stanford engineering graduate and entrepreneur. The company is based in Los Angeles, California.

== History ==
While a student at Stanford, Sterling noticed that the percentage of women in engineering in the United States was only 11%. After research, Sterling found that girls begin to lose interest in math and science as young as age 8. After two years studying early child development, including girls and the gender marketing of toys, Sterling learned that girls excel in verbal skills, reading and writing. She created GoldieBlox to combine the story of Goldie, a girl inventor who loves to build, with a construction kit.

To fund her first round of production, Sterling created a Kickstarter campaign in 2012. The project reached its funding goal of $150,000 in 4 days, and went on to raise a total of $285,881 with 5,519 backers by the end of the campaign.

== Products ==
Geared toward ages 4–9, toys in the GoldieBlox series introduce engineering concepts to girls through storytelling and building. Each toy introduces new characters and concepts. There are six sets in the series.

In 2014, GoldieBlox began introducing digital content. The company's first mobile app, GoldieBlox and the Movie Machine, was introduced in October. The app features the company's first-ever animated cartoon, and was named by Apple as one of the Best Apps of 2014. Bloxtown, GoldieBlox's digital playground, also has original videos of new design ideas for kids to watch and build at home.

== Videos ==
=== GoldieBlox & Rube Goldberg "Princess Machine" ===
GoldieBlox's "Princess Machine" video launched on YouTube in November 2013. The video features three young girls building a Rube Goldberg machine built by Brett Doar, and was set to a parody tune of the Beastie Boys song "Girls". Shortly after the release, the Beastie Boys reached out to GoldieBlox, inquiring about the use of their song without their permission. Goldieblox responded by suing for declaratory judgment in the U.S. District Court of San Francisco seeking declaration of fair use due to parody. GoldieBlox claimed fair use on the grounds that they had "created its parody video specifically to comment on the Beastie Boys song, and to further the company's goal to break down gender stereotypes and to encourage young girls to engage in their intellect." The Beastie Boys responded with an open letter, in which they lauded "the creativity and message behind the ad," voiced their support for GoldieBlox's mission, but ultimately declared that the band did not permit their "music and/or name to be used in product ads," a claim which was further bolstered by a stipulation in deceased band member Adam Yauch's will. The band concluded their letter by stating, "when we tried to simply ask how and why our song 'Girls' had been used in your ad without our permission, YOU sued US." GoldieBlox responded by taking down the video and writing their own open letter, stating that, "although we believe our parody video falls under fair use, we would like to respect [Yauch's] wishes and yours." Regardless, the Beastie Boys went ahead with the counter lawsuit and a settlement was ultimately reached. The settlement granted GoldieBlox a retroactive license for the song. In exchange, GoldieBlox "agreed to make annual payments of 1% of its gross revenue, until the total payments reached $1 million, to a charitable organization chosen by the Beastie Boys and approved by GoldieBlox which supports "science, technology, engineering and/or mathematics education for 'girls'".

=== "This is Your Brain on Engineering (GoldieBlox Easter PSA)" ===
The company's "This is Your Brain on Engineering (GoldieBlox Easter PSA)" video launched on YouTube in April 2014. The video focuses on the difference between a young girl's brain "on princess" vs. her brain "on engineering."

=== "GoldieBlox vs. the Big Sister Machine" ===
"GoldieBlox vs. the Big Sister Machine" launched on YouTube in November 2014. The video focused on the need for female role models inspired by ingenuity and creativity. In the video, Big Sister prescribes her ideals of beauty and perfection to young girls. Little Sister, a girl inspired by Goldie, rebels against the mantra, breaking the girls free and leading them to a world of possibilities. The video is set to "Help I'm Alive" by Metric.

=== "Lightning Strikes" ===
GoldieBlox released their first single and animated music video, "Lightning Strikes," in December 2014. The track is an original song written and performed by Emily Haines, the lead singer of Canadian rock band Metric. The video and song feature Goldie, a strong female character who comes up with a great idea and strives to accomplish it, despite whatever set-backs occur along the way.

== Advertisements ==
=== Intuit's Small Business Big Game Super Bowl commercial ===
In February 2014, GoldieBlox won Intuit's Small Business, Big Game contest, earning a 30-second commercial spot during the broadcast of Super Bowl XLVIII. The commercial airtime was valued at $4 million. With the advertisement, GoldieBlox became the first small business to air an ad in the Super Bowl. The ad was set to a parody of the Slade/Quiet Riot song "Cum On Feel the Noize", changing the words to "Come On Bring the Toys." The ad depicted hundreds of little girls ditching their pink toys, while singing "More than pink, pink, pink, we want to think," and that "girls build like all the boys."
