= OK Go (album) =

Studio album by OK Go
- Released: September 17, 2002
- Recorded: June 2001 – January 2002
- Genres: Alternative rock; pop rock; pop punk; power pop
- Length: 40:39
- Label: Capitol
- Producers: Howard Willing; David Trumfio

OK Go chronology
OK Go (Pink EP) (2001)	OK Go (2002)	Do What You Want (2005)

Singles from OK Go
- 1. "Get Over It" Released: August 1, 2002 (US), March 10, 2003 (UK); 2. "Don't Ask Me" Released: June 16, 2003

Professional ratings
Review scores
Source	Rating
Allmusic	4/5 stars
The Music Box	3.5/5 stars
Pitchfork Media	2.6/10
Rolling Stone	2/5 stars

OK Go is the debut studio album by American rock band OK Go. It was released on September 17, 2002, under the record label Capitol Records. The album was produced by Howard Willing and David Trumfio and was recorded throughout June 2001 and early 2002. OK Go features a more rebellious, aggressive yet melodic, punchy style in their songs.

OK Go debuted at number 107 on Billboard 200, and number one on Billboard Top Heatseekers Chart.

The album's cover art was created by designer Stefan Sagmeister.

== Track listing ==
All lyrics are written by Damian Kulash, except track 9 by Tim Nordwind; all music is composed by Damian Kulash, except where noted.

No.	Title	Writer(s)	Length
1.	"Get Over It"		3:16
2.	"Don't Ask Me"		2:46
3.	"You're So Damn Hot"		2:38
4.	"What to Do"		3:59
5.	"1000 Miles per Hour"		3:33
6.	"Shortly Before the End"	Kulash; Timothy Nordwind; Neal Hefti	4:19
7.	"Return"	Kulash; Nordwind	3:51
8.	"There's a Fire"	Kulash; Andrew Duncan	3:50
9.	"C-C-C-Cinnamon Lips"	Nordwind; Kulash	3:26
10.	"The Fix Is In"	Kulash; Duncan	3:53
11.	"Hello, My Treacherous Friends"		2:59
12.	"Bye Bye Baby"	Kulash; Nordwind	2:14
Total length:			40:39

Notes

- "Shortly Before the End" interpolates "Jervis" by Neal Hefti.

== Appearances in other media ==
"Get Over It" was featured on the soundtrack of the video games Triple Play Baseball 2002 and Madden NFL 2003. "Don't Ask Me" was featured on the soundtrack of the video game MVP Baseball 2003, trailers for Just Friends and Good Luck Chuck (and also "You're So Damn Hot"), and the movie Catch That Kid. "You're So Damn Hot" was used on an episode of The O.C.. It also appeared in a television commercial advertising campaign for Payless Shoes in 2006, and in ads for ABC's television show Castle.

== Personnel ==
All credits for OK GO are adapted from the album's liner notes.

OK Go

- Damian Kulash – lead vocals, guitar, keyboards, programming, percussion; production
- Tim Nordwind – bass, vocals; lead vocals (track 9)
- Andy Duncan – guitar, keyboard, vocals
- Dan Konopka – drums

Additional musicians

- Jon Brion
- Lenny Castro
- Matt Chamberlain
- Josh Freese
- Amanda Gibson
- Mark Greenberg
- Bon Harris
- Vic Indrizzo
- Roger Joseph Manning, Jr.
- Wendy Melvoin
- Brian Perkins
- Patrick Warren

Production

- Howard Willing – production and engineering
- Dave Trumfio – additional production
- Ken Sluiter – additional engineering
- Mike Haglar – additional engineering
- Andrew Slater – executive production
- Tom Lord-Alge – mixing
- Ted Jensen – mastering engineer

== Charts ==
Chart (2003)	Peak position
US Heatseekers Albums (Billboard)	1
UK Albums (Official Charts)	94
US Billboard 200	107
