= Get Over It (OK Go song) =

Single by OK Go

from the album OK Go
- Released: August 1, 2002
- Recorded: 2002
- Genre: Alternative rock; power pop; pop punk
- Length: 3:16
- Label: Capitol
- Songwriter: Damian Kulash

OK Go singles chronology
"Get Over It" (2002)	"Don't Ask Me" (2003)

Music video
- ”Get Over It” on YouTube

UK releases cover artwork

"Get Over It" is the debut single by American rock band OK Go, from their self-titled debut album (2002). It was released as a promotional single in the US (the band's first Capitol Records release) in August 2002 and was released in the UK in March 2003. It precedes the band's first Top of the Pops performance on April 4, 2003.

"You're So Damn Hot" was included as a B-side on the CD single of "Get Over It". Both tracks later appeared on the band's first album. The UK B-side "Ant Music" (originally performed by Adam and the Ants from the 1980 album Kings of the Wild Frontier) was previously released on the band's Pink EP in 2000. "Bruise Grey" is a remake of one of the band's earlier songs which had appeared on their demo disc.

This song was also part of the Madden NFL 2003 and Triple Play 2002 soundtracks. It was also a DLC song for the 2009 video game Guitar Hero 5.

== Music video ==
A music video for "Get Over It" was made in 2002. It features OK Go performing the song in a large recreation hall. Various objects are also shown from time to time in par with the lyrics, such as garbage bags, a wedge of cheese, deer heads, furniture, a Cadillac and different murals. The song is stopped in the middle to show a shot of the band playing ping-pong. The video was directed by Francis Lawrence and was released through the band's website on August 1, 2002. It first aired on MTV on September 2, 2002. The video was created by the same team that did the video for Maroon 5's "Harder to Breathe".

== Track listing ==
=== US promo CD single ===
1. "Get Over It" – 3:18
2. "You're So Damn Hot"

=== UK CD single ===
1. "Get Over It" – 3:18
2. "Ant Music" – 2:53
3. "Bruise Grey"
4. "Get Over It" NHnced Video"

=== UK 7" single ===
1. "Get Over It" – 3:18
2. "Ant Music" – 2:53

=== Australian CD single ===
1. "Get Over It" – 3:18
2. "Ant Music – 2:53
3. "Aren't We Dozy?" – 2:43
4. "It's Tough to Have a Crush When the Boy Doesn't Feel the Same Way You Do" – 2:07

== Charts ==
Chart (2002–2003)	Peak Position
Scottish Singles	24
UK Singles	21
US Alternative Songs	20
