= A Million Ways =

Single by OK Go

from the album Oh No
- B-side: "This Will Be Our Year", "Down for the Count", "The Lovecats"
- Released: August 2005 (US); February 12, 2006 (UK)
- Recorded: 2004–2005
- Length: 3:13
- Label: Capitol
- Songwriters: Damian Kulash; Tim Nordwind
- Producer: Tore Johansson

OK Go singles chronology
"Don't Ask Me" (2002)	"A Million Ways" (2005)	"Do What You Want" (2006)

"A Million Ways" is a song by American rock band OK Go from their second studio album, Oh No (2005). It was the first song from the album to be released as a single and became the band's breakthrough song from the album because the accompanying music video went viral on the Internet.

The B-side "This Will Be Our Year" is a cover version of the song by The Zombies from their album Odessey and Oracle (1968), and had been previously released on the compilation album Future Soundtrack for America (2004). "The Lovecats", a cover of The Cure's hit single, had been released on the band's previous EP Do What You Want (2005), and was released later for a third time on the single "Here It Goes Again" (2006). "Down for the Count" had not been released, but was released as a digital single on iTunes in 2007.

The song featured as a playable track in the game Band Hero. The song also appeared in the 2007 film I Could Never Be Your Woman.

== Track listings ==
=== U.S. promo one-sided 7" single ===
1. "A Million Ways"

=== UK CD single 1 ===
1. "A Million Ways"
2. "This Will Be Our Year"

=== UK CD single 2 ===
1. "A Million Ways"
2. "Down for the Count"
3. "The Lovecats"
4. "A Million Ways" (enhanced video)

=== UK 7" single ===
1. "A Million Ways"
2. "This Will Be Our Year"

== Music video ==
A low-budget, homemade music video for the song was made in April or May 2005 showing the band in frontman Damian Kulash's backyard, performing a complex, quirky dance routine choreographed by his sister, Trish Sie. The song's vocals are lip-synced in the video by bassist Tim Nordwind instead of Kulash, following the format from the dance choreographed for the song "C-C-C-Cinnamon Lips", which Nordwind provided vocals for. The footage was not intended to be released as the single's music video, but it was sent via e-mail to friends of the band and spread around the Internet, becoming a viral sensation. It premiered on Fuse on August 18, 2005. The band was inspired by music videos such as Janet Jackson's "Rhythm Nation" and the 1999 film The Matrix for the video's choreography.

On July 18, 2006, OK Go unveiled "The OK Go Dances With You(Tube) Contest" in which contestants submitted their pastiches of the video on YouTube. The winners would dance live with the band at one of their concerts. The contest ended on August 31. A compilation of these submissions was added on the DVD for the Deluxe Edition of Oh No.

The routine has been performed by the band live on many occasions. They performed it on Mad TV and Soccer AM. They also performed the number in Paris, France to promote their French website.
