= Here It Goes Again =

2006 single by OK Go

Single by OK Go

from the album Oh No
- B-side: "The Lovecats"
- Released: September 4, 2006
- Studio: Gula Studion (Malmö, Sweden)
- Genre: Power pop
- Length: 3:00
- Label: Capitol; EMI
- Songwriter: Damian Kulash
- Producer: Tore Johansson

OK Go singles chronology
"Invincible" (2006)	"Here It Goes Again" (2006)	"WTF?" (2009)

"Here It Goes Again" is a song by American rock band OK Go, the fifth single released from their second studio album, Oh No (2005). It was the band's only single to chart on the US Billboard Hot 100 until "I Won't Let You Down" in November 2014 and peaked at number 36 on the UK Singles Chart, giving the band their second UK top-40 hit. The music video, featuring the band dancing on treadmills, became a staple on YouTube, at one time being one of their most-watched videos, with over 72 million views.

The single's B-side, "The Lovecats", is a cover of the song by the Cure and was previously included on the band's Do What You Want EP and the single "A Million Ways". An alternate version was nicknamed "UK Surf".

== Composition and recording ==
Written by frontman Damian Kulash, the three-minute "Here It Goes Again" is set in common time at a "Moderately fast rock" tempo of 144 beats per minute. It is composed in the key of C major, with the vocal range spanning from C_{4} to A_{4}. Kulash also sang and played the guitar in the original mix, which was produced by Tore Johansson with co-production done by Eric Drew Feldman, Howard Willing and Ken Sluiter. Andy Duncan was another guitarist on the track, and he remained for the composition of the song before his departure from the band. Other instruments on the recording include drums performed by Dan Konopka and bass by Tim Nordwind. David Carlsson and Petter Lindgård were the song's engineers, with Jens Lindgård being the engineering assistant. Recorded at Gula Studion in Malmö, Sweden, it was mixed at The Village Recorder in Los Angeles by Dave Sardy, and finally mastered by Robert Vosgien at Capitol Mastering, also in Los Angeles.

== Commercial performance ==
On the American Billboard Hot 100 chart, issue dated September 16, 2006, "Here It Goes Again" debuted at number 87, and by the next week it rose to its peak of number 38. The track lasted a total of 20 weeks. Additionally, it reached into the top 40 onto the Pop 100 at number 34, as well as number 17 on the Adult Top 40 and Modern Rock Tracks charts. "Here It Goes Again" was also a top-40 hit in other countries. On the UK Singles Chart, it debuted at number 36, while on New Zealand's RIANZ Singles Chart, its peak position was number 28. In Australia, the song entered at number 67 on the ARIA Singles Chart and rose to number 63 the next week. It also topped the Hitseekers chart, which surveys tracks by bands that have not entered the top 50 of the main chart.

== Music video ==
The music video of this song is a performance of the band dancing on eight treadmills, arranged in two rows of four and in alternating opposite directions, in a single continuous take. The video was choreographed and co-directed by the band and lead singer Damian Kulash's sister Trish Sie and filmed at her home in Orlando, Florida, between tour stops for the band's Oh No album. It took two to three days of practice and then 17 attempts to complete the video. As in the band's video for "A Million Ways", bassist Tim Nordwind lip-syncs the lead vocals instead of Kulash, following the format from the dance choreographed for the song "C-C-C-Cinnamon Lips", which Tim sings.

The band did not inform its managers or Capitol Records of creating the video, fearing they would be refused if they said they were pausing the tour for several days and were spending $4000 to make the video. The finished video sat for at least a year on Kulash's laptop, as they were worried about being stereotyped as a "goofy dancing band" following the viral success of their previous video for "A Million Ways"; After about a year, the band's webmaster suggested they upload the video to YouTube, which at the time was just beginning to take off as a video sharing site. The video debuted on YouTube on July 31, 2006, and has been viewed over 72 million times as of October 2026. It premiered on VH1's Top 20 Countdown that same day. OK Go performed the dance routine live at the 2006 MTV Video Music Awards.

The music video won the 2007 Grammy Award for Best Short Form Music Video and the 2006 YouTube awards for Most Creative Video.

The video was ranked No. 9 on "The Must List" in the August 18, 2006, issue of Entertainment Weekly: "The votes have been tallied, and this year's award for Best Use of Treadmills in an Alt-Pop Music Video goes to ... http://okgo.net/news.aspx". In July 2011, the music video was named one of "The 30 All-Time Best Music Videos" by Time magazine.

== UK Surf Mix ==
During mid-2006, the band recorded a slower version of "Here It Goes Again" "in their attic". This version, dubbed "UK Surf" or the "UK Surf Mix", was released on iTunes in the UK the same day as the single. After being featured in the January 2007 Grey's Anatomy episode "Six Days (Part 2)", it was released in the US through iTunes on February 1, 2007, as a digital download.

== Track listings ==
European single-side 7-inch single

1. "Here It Goes Again" – 2:59

European and Australian CD single

1. "Here It Goes Again" – 2:59
2. "The Lovecats" – 3:31

New Zealand CD single

1. "Here It Goes Again"
2. "Here It Goes Again" (UK Surf)
3. "Here It Goes Again" (video)

== Credits and personnel ==
Credits are adapted from liner notes of the single release.

Locations

- Recorded at Gula Studion in Malmö, Sweden
- Mixed at The Village Recorder in Los Angeles, California
- Mastered at Capitol Mastering in Los Angeles, California

Personnel

- Songwriting, vocals, guitar – Damian Kulash Jr.
- Production – Tore Johansson
- Co-production – Eric Drew Feldman, Howard Willing, Ken Sluiter
- Engineering – David Carlsson, Petter Lindgård
- Assistant engineering – Jens Lindgård
- Guitar – Andy Duncan
- Bass – Tim Nordwind
- Drums – Dan Konopka
- Mixing – Dave Sardy
- Mastering – Robert Vosgien

== Charts ==
Chart (2006–2007)	Peak position
Australia (ARIA)	63
Australia Hitseekers (ARIA)	1
Canada Rock (Billboard)	44
Czech Republic Modern Rock (IFPI)	12
New Zealand (Recorded Music NZ)	28
Scottish Singles Sales (Official Charts)	41
UK Singles (Official Charts)	36
US Billboard Hot 100	38
US Adult Pop Airplay (Billboard)	17
US Alternative Airplay (Billboard)	17
US Pop 100 (Billboard)	34

== Certifications ==
Region	Certification	Certified units/sales
New Zealand (RMNZ)	Gold	15,000^{‡}
United Kingdom (BPI)	Silver	200,000^{‡}
United States (RIAA)	2× Platinum	2,000,000^{‡}
^{‡} Sales+streaming figures based on certification alone.

== Release history ==
Region	Date	Format	Label	Ref.
United States	September 4, 2006	Modern rock radio	Capitol	
United States	September 12, 2006	Contemporary hit radio	Capitol	
United Kingdom	September 25, 2006	CD	Capitol	
Australia	October 23, 2006	CD	Capitol	

== In popular culture ==
According to MTV Games's Paul McGooyer, the video game Rock Band helped to spur further interest in the band. The E3 2016 trailer for Lego Dimensions features the song, as well as the 2007 theme park simulation game Thrillville: Off the Rails. This song featured in the NBC sitcom Scrubs in the sixth-season episode "My Mirror Image," as well as in the 2011 film Bucky Larson: Born to Be a Star. Parodies of the video have appeared on The Simpsons, The Fairly OddParents, Foster's Home for Imaginary Friends, Kuu Kuu Harajuku (created by Gwen Stefani), and Hey Duggee. It was also featured in the 2007 movie Mr. Woodcock.
