= Oh No (OK Go album) =

- First edition album cover; later issues feature a fully damask design without the band’s name.

Studio album by OK Go
- Released: August 30, 2005
- Recorded: Late 2004
- Studios: Gula Studion (Malmö, Sweden)
- Genres: Alternative rock, Power pop, Garage rock
- Length: 41:40
- Label: Capitol
- Producer: Tore Johansson

OK Go chronology
Do What You Want (2005)	Oh No (2005)	You're Not Alone (2008)

Singles from Oh No
- 1. "A Million Ways" Released: August 2005; 2. "Do What You Want" Released: April 3, 2006; 3. "Oh Lately It's So Quiet" Released: May 2006; 4. "Invincible" Released: June 2006; 5. "Here It Goes Again" Released: September 4, 2006

Oh No is the second studio album by American rock band OK Go. It was released on August 30, 2005. The album was recorded in late 2004 with producer Tore Johansson in Malmö, Sweden, and mixed by Dave Sardy in Los Angeles. It is OK Go's final studio album to feature guitarist Andy Duncan, who left the band shortly after recording finished.

After the band's performance at the 2006 MTV Video Music Awards, the album rose from number 87 to 69 on the Billboard 200 albums chart, the highest position achieved by the group at the time.

On 7 November 2006, OK Go released a deluxe limited edition CD/DVD of the album. The DVD contains their official music videos, a video from 180 fans doing the "A Million Ways" dance for a YouTube contest, previously unseen footage, and a behind-the-scenes look of their treadmill rehearsals for the video and for the VMAs.

On 28 August 2026, OK Go released an expanded edition of the album dubbed the Extra Nice Edition, featuring bonus tracks of previously released material including covers, b-sides and alternate versions, but omitting the hidden track "9027KM", a 34-minute track of ambient noise.

== Track listing ==
All tracks are written by Damian Kulash Jr., except where noted.

No.	Title	Writer(s)	Length
1.	"Invincible"		3:30
2.	"Do What You Want"	Timothy Nordwind; Kulash	3:05
3.	"Here It Goes Again"		3:00
4.	"A Good Idea at the Time"	Nordwind; Kulash	3:05
5.	"Oh Lately It's So Quiet"		3:00
6.	"It's a Disaster"		3:20
7.	"A Million Ways"	Nordwind; Kulash	3:12
8.	"No Sign of Life"		3:48
9.	"Let It Rain"	Nordwind; Kulash	2:56
10.	"Crash the Party"		2:24
11.	"Television, Television"		2:40
12.	"Maybe, This Time"	Andrew Duncan; Kulash	3:15
13.	"The House Wins"		4:14
Total length:			41:40

Hidden track
No.	Title	Writer(s)	Length
14.	"9027 KM"	Kulash; Nordwind; Daniel Konopka	34:46
Total length:			76:26

Extra Nice Edition
No.	Title	Writer(s)	Length
14.	"Here It Goes Again (UK Mix)"		3:15
15.	"Down for the Count"		3:00
16.	"The Lovecats"	Robert Smith	3:31
17.	"Any Time at All"	Lennon–McCartney	2:11
18.	"Do You Love Me Now"	Kim Deal; Kelley Deal	2:23
19.	"Oh Lately It's So Quiet (Acoustic)"		2:46
20.	"A Million Ways (Live from SoHo)"	Nordwind; Kulash	3:23
21.	"Do What You Want (Live from SoHo)"	Nordwind; Kulash	2:57
22.	"Here It Goes Again (Live from SoHo)"		3:19
Total length:			68:25

== Reception ==
Professional ratings
Aggregate scores
Source	Rating
Metacritic	(64/100)
Review scores
Source	Rating
AllMusic	4/5 stars
Entertainment.ie	4/5 stars
Kludge	6/10
Pitchfork Media	2.2/10
PopMatters	7/10
Slant Magazine	4/5 stars

Oh No received generally positive reviews, and holds an aggregated 64 out of 100, based on 14 critic reviews, indicating "generally favourable reviews".

== Personnel ==
All credits for Oh No are adapted from the album's liner notes.

OK Go

- Damian Kulash – vocals, guitar, piano, keyboards, percussion
- Tim Nordwind – bass, vocals
- Dan Konopka – drums
- Andy Duncan – guitar, keyboards, vibraphone, vocals

Additional musicians

- Jens Lingård – trombone (tracks 4 and 8)
- Peter Lingård – trumpet (tracks 4 and 8)
- Sven Andersson – trombone (tracks 4 and 8)
- Filip Runesson – viola (track 13)
- Rasmus Kihlberg – additional drums (tracks 6, 10, and 13)
- The Mopeds – actors ("The Space Odyssey Counting Gang") (track 1)
- Hannah Montoya – additional drums (track 4)
- Flor Serna – keyboards (track 6)

Production credits

- Tore Johansson – producer, engineer, mixing (4–9, 12, 13)
- Jens Lingård – assistant producer, engineer
- David Carlsson – engineer
- Peter Lingård – engineer
- Dave Sardy – mixing (1–3, 10, 11)
- Ken Slutier – second unit producer
- Eric Drew Feldman – second unit 1st assistant producer
- Howard Willing – second unit 2nd assistant producer/A&R liaison for Capitol Records
- Robert Vosgien – mastering engineer
- Mary Fagot – art direction
- Damian Kulash, Jr. – design
- Sunja Park – layout
- Dusan Reljin – photography
- Tom Fowlks – additional photography

== Certifications ==
Region	Certification	Certified units/sales
United States (RIAA)	Gold	500,000^{‡}
^{‡} Sales+streaming figures based on certification alone.
