= Bonerama =

American funk rock brass band

- Origin: New Orleans, Louisiana, U.S.
- Genres: New Orleans Jazz, R&B, funk rock
- Years active: 1998–present
- Labels: Basin Street, Buffalo
- Members: Mark Mullins; Craig Klein; Greg Hicks; Bert Cotton; Matt Perrine; Walt Lundy; Michael Mullins
- Past members: Russell Batiste; Eric Bolivar; Alvin Ford Jr.; Alex Joseph Hall; Nori Naraoka; Brian O'Neill; Steve Suter; Rick Trolsen; Charlie Wooton; Chad Gilmore; Joe Ashlar
- Website: boneramabrass.com

Bonerama is a funk rock brass band from New Orleans.

Bonerama was formed in 1998 by trombone players Mark Mullins and Craig Klein, who, from 1990 up until late 2006, were also members of Harry Connick Jr.'s big band. Shortly thereafter, they added trombone players Steve Suter, Brian O'Neill, and Rick Trolsen, sousaphone player Matt Perrine, guitarist Bert Cotton, and drummer Eric Bolivar. New Orleans drummers Russell Batiste, Stanton Moore, Doug Belote, Chad Gilmore, Terence Higgins, and Kevin O'Day have also been playing with Bonerama for periods of time. Later, Charlie Wooton and Nori Naraoka electric bass replaced Matt Perrine before his return to the band in 2013. Brian O'Neill had a heart attack and died while on a solo piano gig in New Orleans in December 2005.

Bonerama released their debut album in 2001. On January 2, 2008, Bonerama performed the national anthem at the 2008 Sugar Bowl. On February 5, they released a joint EP with OK Go, entitled You're Not Alone, to raise money for New Orleans musicians displaced by the 2005 Hurricane Katrina. After the departure of Rick Trolsen and Steve Suter in early 2009, trombonist Greg Hicks joined the band.

== Discography ==
- Live at the Old Point (Bonerama, 2001)
- Live from New York (Mule Train, 2004)
- Bringing It Home (MTP, 2007)
- Shake It Baby (Bonerama, 2013)
- Hot Like Fire (Basin Street, 2017)
- Bonerama Plays Zeppelin (Basin Street, 2019)
- So Much Love (Bonerama, 2026)
