= Sterling Sturtevant =

Sterling Sturtevant (1922–1962) was a designer and art director for animated cartoons in an era in which few women were worked in Hollywood animation. Some of her early work was done under her married name Sterling Glasband.

== Biography ==
Sturtevant was born June 20, 1922, in Redlands, California. She attended the University of Redlands from 1940 to 1944, and then attended Chouinard Art Institute, before taking her first job in animation at Walt Disney Pictures. The Los Angeles Evening Citizen News referred to her as "one of Hollywood's top designers of cartoon characters." She died May 23, 1962, in Los Angeles, California, at age 39.

== Career ==
Sturtevant started work in animation at Walt Disney Pictures in 1947, where she drew story sketches for, and co-wrote the 1948 Pluto cartoon "Bone Bandit".

From Disney she moved to the cartoon studio United Productions of America (UPA), where she did some of her best-known work, particularly her redesign of the character Mr. Magoo into his now-classic form. Cartoon Modern said of Mr. Magoo "The series hit a nice stride in 1953, when Sterling Sturtevant took over as regular Magoo designer. Sturtevant redesigned Magoo, removing many of his gruff edges and giving him a baby-doll-head appeal," and refers to her work on Magoo as giving him a "leaner and more streamlined look." In 1953, she was art director for the animated feature "When Magoo Flew", one of the first animated films produced in CinemaScope. The film won the Academy Award for best short animated film in 1955.

Animation Obsessive said of her work for UPA:

"Another highlight of the Sturtevant-era Magoo films is the way that they depict women and girls. Each one has a conspicuously strong and adventurous design, pushed in ways that cartoons tended to reserve for male characters. Even by the standards of UPA, which was more comfortable with cartoony designs for women, Sturtevant’s films feel refreshing."

From UPA she moved to Playhouse Pictures, which Cartoon Modern described as “one of the busiest and most successful commercial animation studios in Los Angeles” during the 1950s. Bill Hurtz at Playhouse said of her "she was shy, but she was an incredible draftsman." At Playhouse she worked on television and advertisements, including the first animation of Charles Schultz's Peanuts characters, in advertisements for Ford. Charles Schultz, commenting on the work, singled out "Sterling's touch" for praise. Her work for Playhouse won the "Art Directors Club Medal" in 1957 and was awarded first place for animated TV commercials at the International Advertising Film Festival in Venice in 1960. She worked at Playhouse until her death from pancreatic cancer in 1962.
