= OK Go =

American rock band

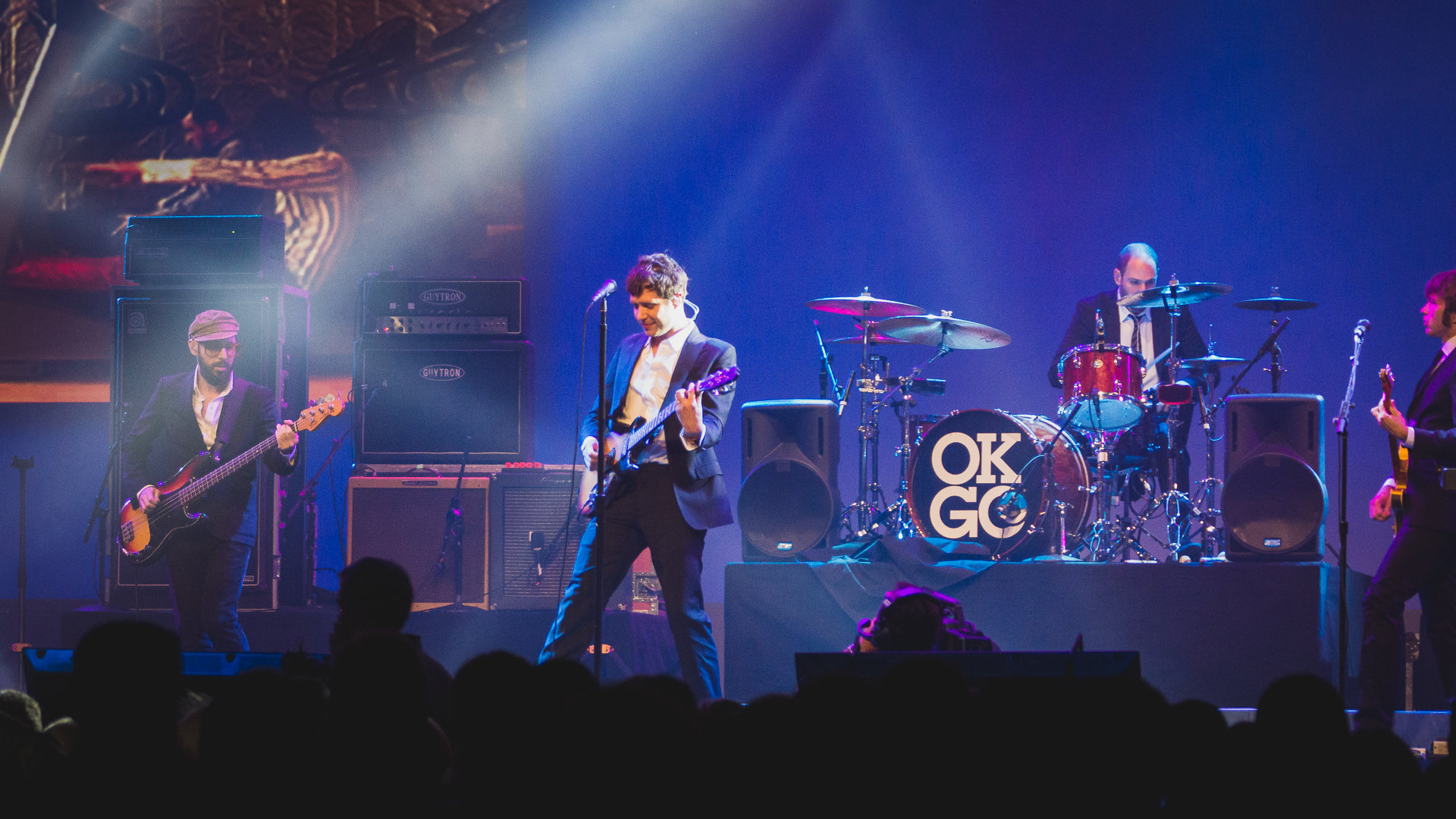
- OK Go performing in 2012. From left to right: Tim Nordwind, Damian Kulash, Dan Konopka, Andy Ross

Background information
- Origin: Chicago, Illinois, U.S.
- Genres: Alternative rock; power pop; pop rock; indie rock; indie pop
- Years active: 1998–present
- Labels: Paracadute; Capitol; EMI; BMG
- Members: Damian Kulash; Tim Nordwind; Dan Konopka; Andy Ross
- Past members: Andy Duncan
- Website: okgo.net

OK Go is an American rock band formed in 1998 and based in Los Angeles, California. The band is composed of Damian Kulash (lead vocals, guitar), Tim Nordwind (bass, vocals), Dan Konopka (drums and percussion), and Andy Ross (guitar, keyboards and vocals).

The band is known for its quirky, complex music videos which are often elaborately choreographed to be filmed in a single long take and make extensive use of practical effects and optical illusions.

The band was formed in Chicago, Illinois, moved to Los Angeles in 2001, released two studio albums before original guitarist Andy Duncan left in 2005, and has released three more since. The band's video for "Here It Goes Again", in which the band dances on moving treadmills, won the Grammy Award for Best Music Video in 2007.

== History ==
External videos
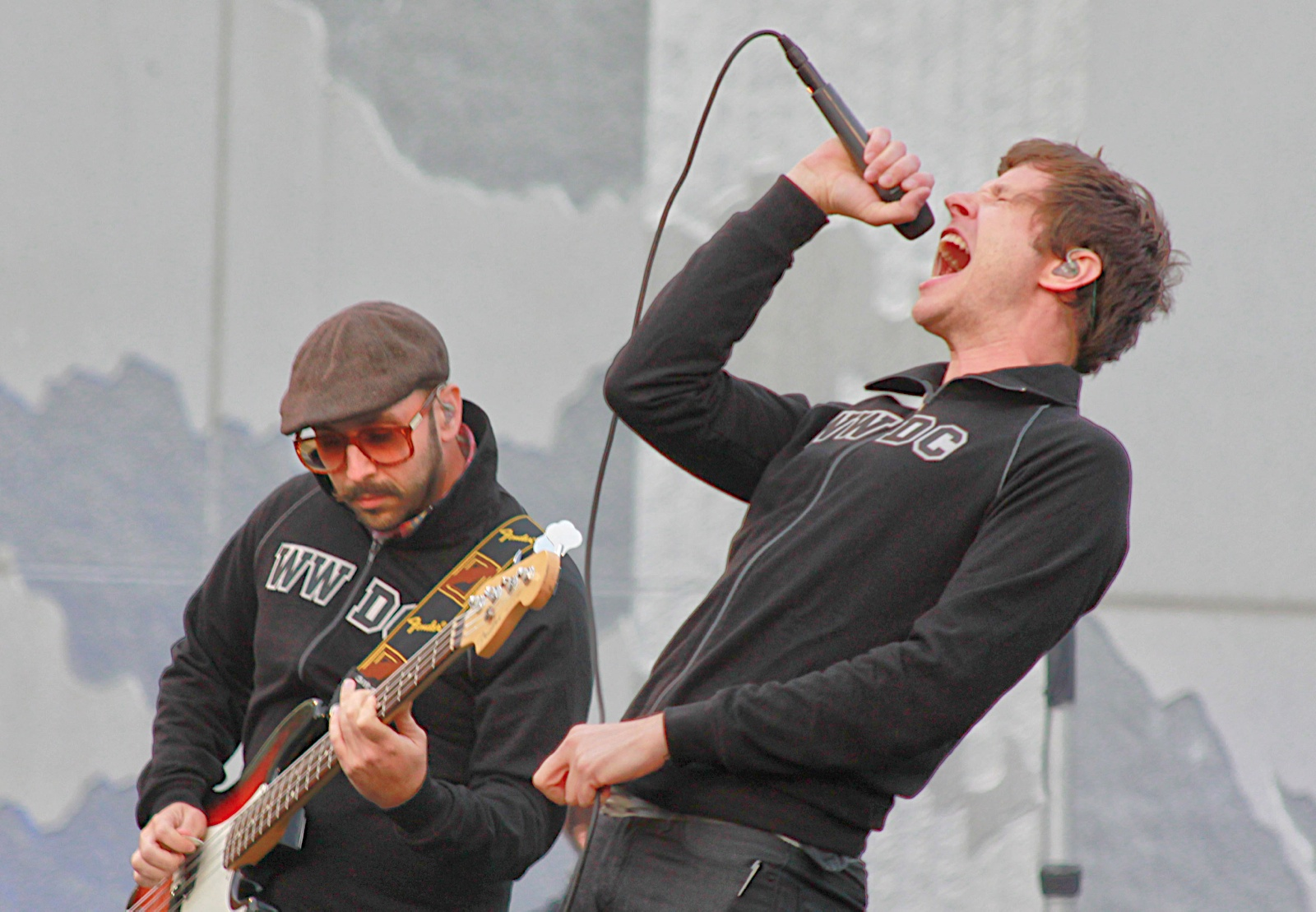
- OK Go - Wikipedia: Fact or Fiction?, 15:52, Diffuser.fm

=== Formation and early years (1998–2000) ===
The band's lead singer, Damian Kulash, met bassist Tim Nordwind at Interlochen Arts Camp near Traverse City, Michigan, when they were 11. The band name comes from an inside joke developed at Interlochen; their art teacher had an often high assistant who would repeatedly say, "OK... Go!" while they were drawing. They kept in touch after camp, often exchanging mixtapes which influenced each other's musical tastes and the band's future sound. They met the band's future guitarist and keyboardist Andy Duncan in high school. Nordwind and Duncan moved to Chicago for college, and, with drummer Dan Konopka, formed the band Stanley's Joyful Noise. After graduating from Brown University, Kulash moved to Chicago. The quartet formed OK Go with the name being "an obvious choice for us" according to Nordwind.

OK Go's first show in Chicago was at the Empty Bottle on March 25, 1999. The band marketed themselves aggressively, putting up posters all around Chicago and touring heavily. Within a year the group had shared the stage with international artists such as Elliott Smith, the Promise Ring, the Olivia Tremor Control and Sloan. At the end of 2000, the band was invited by radio host Ira Glass to serve as the house band for live performances of This American Life. Glass also helped the band creatively after asking Kulash the question, "Do you see yourselves as being earnest or clever?" Kulash struggled with the question before deciding that the answer was earnest. "I wanted to write a full-on rock song, one that made me feel like Queen songs made me feel", after which he wrote "Get Over It".

The band self-released two EPs, titled Brown EP (2000) and Pink EP (2001), which were culled from an album's worth of songs recorded in February 2000 with producer Dave Trumfio, to serve as demos. The demos did not land the band a label deal, but got them the attention of booking agent Frank Riley, who booked them as the opening act for a few shows by They Might Be Giants. OK Go eventually opened for They Might Be Giants on five tours; singer John Flansburgh briefly sought to co-manage them.

In 2001 the group moved to Los Angeles, although they considered their Chicago roots important even a decade later.

=== OK Go (2001–2004) ===
In April 2001, the band signed with Capitol Records, forgoing offers from bigger labels because they believed that, as the first signing by newly hired label president Andy Slater, they would get more attention and support.

The band recorded its self-titled debut album at the Capitol Studios in Los Angeles. OK Go's original plan was to do minor tweaks to its original demo recordings; instead, the band rerecorded everything and added five new songs, including the first single "Get Over It", which later appeared in the video games Triple Play Baseball, Madden NFL 2003, and Guitar Hero 5.

The label delayed the album's release from its original June 2002 date to September 17. To promote the album, the label sent out miniature ping pong tables to press outlets, a reference to the "Get Over It" video directed by Francis Lawrence, while the band toured with acts including the Vines, Phantom Planet, Superdrag, the Donnas, Fountains of Wayne, and Mew, and played festival shows including Leeds in 2002 and 2003, and NoisePop, Reading, Witnness, and T in the Park in 2003.

In the United States, the album reached #1 on the Billboard Heatseekers Chart and #107 on the Billboard 200 Chart. In the United Kingdom, the first single "Get Over It" debuted at no. 27, in the UK singles chart on March 16, 2003, and the band performed it on that week's edition of Top of the Pops. Also that week, the single's video was named video of the week by Q magazine.

=== Oh No and You're Not Alone (2005–2008) ===
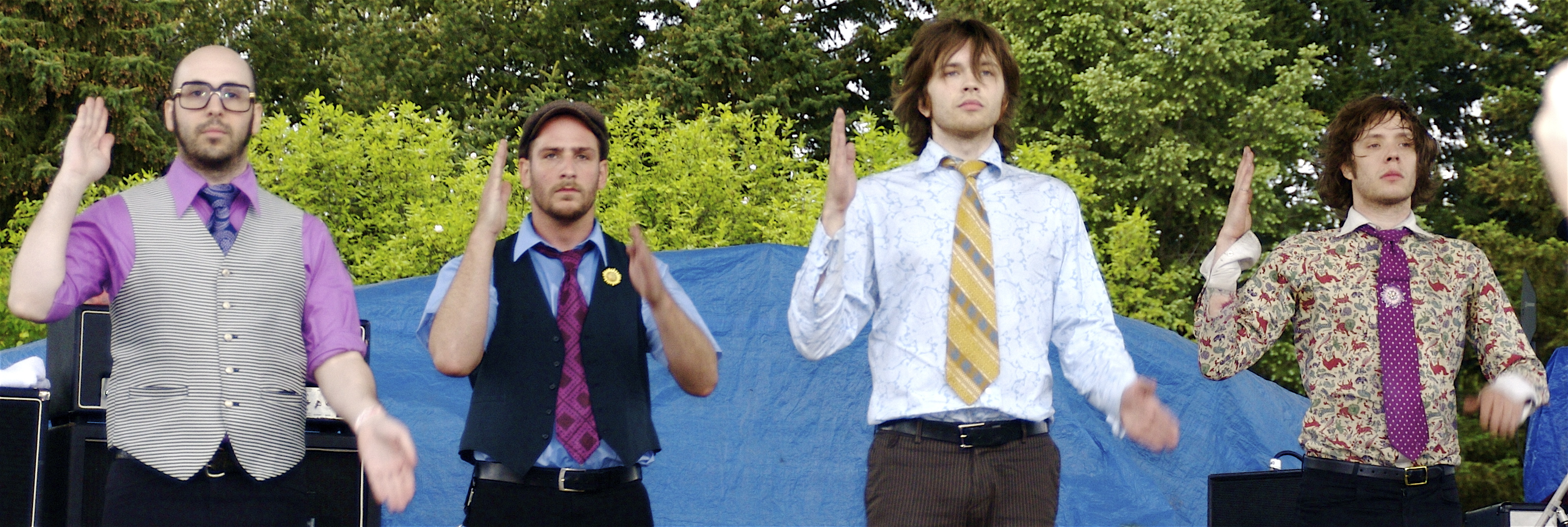
OK Go at the Albany Tulip Festival (May 2006)

The band's second album, Oh No, was recorded in Malmö, Sweden, in the fall of 2004 and was produced by Tore Johansson (the Cardigans, Franz Ferdinand) and mixed by Dave Sardy (Nine Inch Nails, Jet, System of a Down). In February 2005, Duncan left the band, citing creative differences, major label pressures, and the band's rigorous touring schedule. Duncan was replaced by Andy Ross, who beat out 34 other guitarists who auditioned for the role, in a process that ended with each candidate being asked about their willingness to do a choreographed dance on stage. Ross introduced himself to the band's fans by writing a blog post entitled "The Will To Rock", in which he detailed life on the road, beginning with his first show with the band on February 18, 2005.

Released in August 2005, Oh No gained popularity for its first single, "A Million Ways". Ross programmed a web application, hosted at a1000000ways.com, that allowed people to hear the single and to share it with their friends in exchange for free downloads from the iTunes music store. The video for "A Million Ways" featured the band in a backyard performing a dance choreographed by lead singer Kulash's sister, Trish Sie. By August 2006, the video had become the most downloaded music video ever, with over 9 million downloads. The band performed the dance live on British TV show Soccer AM, as well as on the late-night American comedy show Mad TV. The US version of the album includes "9027 km", a 35-minute track of Kulash's girlfriend sleeping that is not listed on the album art. Fans speculated that the track's name is derived from the distance between Los Angeles, California, and Malmö, Sweden, where the album was recorded and that the track was included to prevent the band's label from using the extra space for digital rights management (DRM) software. On December 6, 2005, Kulash published an op-ed piece in The New York Times advocating against record labels' use of DRM.

The band toured extensively to support Oh No, sharing dates with Death Cab For Cutie, Panic! at the Disco, Kaiser Chiefs, and Snow Patrol. They did special performances, including free shows on New Year's Eve in New York City's Times Square and in the parking lot before the University of Michigan-vs.-Michigan State University football game They played festivals such as the Edinburgh Fringe Festival, Bennicassim in Spain, Formoz Festival in Taiwan, Summer Sonic in Japan, and Incheon Pentaport in South Korea.

On November 7, 2006, after the success of the "Here It Goes Again" music video, the band released a deluxe DVD version of the album. The DVD contains a documentary on the making of the album, the four official Capitol Records videos, a video of the band's appearance on Chic-a-Go-Go, a "super cut" of the hundreds of fan versions of the "A Million Ways" dance, a behind-the-scenes video of the making of "Here It Goes Again", rehearsals for the 2006 MTV Video Music Awards, an acoustic performance of "What to Do", a video for "There's A Fire" featuring video game characters, a dance booth version of "Don't Ask Me”, and live versions of "Do What You Want" and "You're So Damn Hot".

After visiting New Orleans in 2007, the band returned to record an EP with New Orleans funk rock band Bonerama and producer Mark Nevers, to raise money for musicians who were still displaced by the 2005 Hurricane Katrina. The EP, entitled You're Not Alone, was released on Mardi Gras, February 5, 2008. The title is taken from a line in David Bowie's "Rock 'n' Roll Suicide", a cover of which appears on the EP, along with renditions of Bob Dylan's "I Shall Be Released" and three songs from Oh No. The EP was sold through iTunes and raised over $40,000, which helped buy a new home for New Orleans musician Al "Carnival Time" Johnson in the Musicians Village. Johnson, who sings on "I Will Be Released", the final song on the EP, moved into his new home in December 2008. In support of the EP, OK Go and Bonearama played benefit shows on January 11, 2008, at Tipitina's in New Orleans, and on February 2, 2008, at the 9:30 Club in Washington, D.C. The D.C. show was streamed live by NPR and featured on a subsequent NPR podcast.

=== Of the Blue Colour of the Sky (2008–2012) ===
On October 12, 2008, OK Go announced that the members had finished writing new songs for its third album and were in the studios in upstate New York with producer Dave Fridmann (the Flaming Lips, MGMT). The band previewed its third album, titled Of the Blue Colour of the Sky, with several dates on the US East Coast, starting in Philadelphia on March 6, 2009, at the TLA Theatre. The name of the album comes from a pseudo-scientific book written by Augustus Pleasonton in 1876 entitled The Influence of the Blue Ray of the Sunlight and of the Blue Colour of the Sky. The members of the band have said that these songs are the "danciest, most anthemic, most heartbroken, and honest songs" of their career, and the album itself takes a much more funky, dance-prone, yet melancholy sound to it, drawing influence from Prince. On May 7, 2009, a song from the album, titled "Skyscrapers", was released for streaming online. Their first single, "WTF?", in which the music video features the band performing with various props in a distorted, hypnotic background, was released on November 17, 2009. On January 8, 2010, OK Go appeared on The Tonight Show with Conan O'Brien and performed a song from the album, "This Too Shall Pass". Of the Blue Colour of the Sky was released on January 12, 2010.

After the first two videos for Of the Blue Colour of the Sky were posted to YouTube in 2009, the band was quickly met with complaints from fans who were only able to view them on YouTube. In response, Kulash posted a long letter on the band's website explaining the record label's policies. The letter itself went viral, after being reprinted in Gizmodo, cited as "required reading" on BoingBoing, and excerpted on many other websites. At the end of the letter, Kulash included embed codes for the band's most recent video in direct opposition to the desires of the label. On February 20, 2010, the New York Times printed an op-ed in which Kulash furthered the arguments he made in his open letter.

On March 9, 2010, the band uploaded a video to YouTube entitled "OK Go Announces new label", in which Kulash, accompanied by two dogs in neckties, announced the creation of Paracadute. On March 10, 2010, the band announced it had cut ties with EMI and Capitol and formed the independent label Paracadute. The split became official on April 1, 2010. Paracadute then assumed ownership of the album, Of the Blue Colour of the Sky, though the band's first two albums, OK Go and Oh No remained catalog items of EMI. That night, OK Go performed a single from its newly independent record on Late Night with Jimmy Kimmel. Now charting its own destiny as an independent entity, the band has attempted to plot a new course for itself, as Kulash puts it: "We're trying to be a DIY [do-it-yourself] band in a post-major label world."

The first wholly new release on the band's label Paracadute Recordings was 180/365, a live album recorded over several shows in 2010, mixed by producer Fridmann, and released on June 21, 2011. The album title refers to the number of concerts the band played in the course of one year. A stream of the album premiered on the technology website Mashable before its official street date. To celebrate the release, the band printed and sold 200 signed copies of 180/365: The Book, a limited-edition book of tour photographs by Nathaniel Wood that was made available only to purchasers of the album. The album was sold digitally and on CD in six-panel eco-friendly "Tron Pack" packaging from Norway.

In July 2012, the band partnered with the Humble Bundle for a pay-what-you-will release of the remix collection Twelve Remixes Of Four Songs, alongside titles from MC Frontalot, They Might Be Giants, Christopher Tin, Hitoshi Sakimoto, and Jonathan Coulton.

The band's most successful example of its new business model was taking money from State Farm Insurance, which was looking to tap into a younger audience by creating a piece of interesting digital content. The band created a music video for "This Too Shall Pass", in which a toy truck with State Farm branding was used to start a large Rube Goldberg machine built in a warehouse. Released on March 1, 2010, the video quickly went viral, with 1.4 million YouTube views in the first 48 hours and over 50 million total views as of February 2016. Since that video, OK Go has employed a similar model in projects funded by Range Rover, Yahoo, Cisco, Samsung, Google Chrome, Jose Cuervo, and Chevrolet.

=== Hungry Ghosts (2012–2019) ===
In December 2012, OK Go released a collection of rare songs, B-sides and covers called Twelve Days of OK Go. The collection was released for free on the band's website and includes covers of songs by the Beatles, They Might Be Giants, the Kinks, Adam and the Ants, and Pixies.

Following Twelve Days of OK Go, in January 2013 the band announced Twelve Months of OK Go, a free long-form release of new and rare recordings, B-sides, and covers. One song per month was distributed through the band's email list and free MP3 web store. The collection includes covers of songs by the Breeders, the Specials, and Nelly. In March 2013, OK Go released a new single, "I'm Not Through", through "Twelve Months of OK Go" and in partnership with advertising agency Saatchi & Saatchi for The Saatchi & Saatchi Music Video Challenge.

On April 3, 2013, OK Go announced on its YouTube channel that the band was recording its fourth studio album. On May 6, 2014, OK Go announced that the album, Hungry Ghosts, would be released in October 2014. The album was made available for pre-order on the direct-to-fan platform, PledgeMusic. The first official single, "The Writing's on the Wall" was released on June 17, 2014, along with a music video which received over 7 million views on YouTube within a week.

On October 14, 2014, Hungry Ghosts was released. Since then, the Pledge Music campaign has stopped. A music video for "I Won't Let You Down" was released on October 27, 2014. In its first two weeks, the video hit 12 million views on YouTube. The video features a cameo from the J-pop band Perfume.

The video for "Upside Down & Inside Out" was released on February 11, 2016, where the band perform the song while moving about in microgravity, with the aid of a reduced-gravity aircraft provided by the Russian S7 Airlines.

On July 20, 2016, OK Go released "I Don't Understand You", a stand-alone single that was a collaboration with Perfume, as ending theme of TOKYO MX 20th Anniversary Memorial TV Animation 3DCG short 'SUshi Police' anime series.

On November 24, 2016, OK Go released the music video for "The One Moment", featuring multiple seemingly unconnected events filmed in the span of a few seconds. The video is then slowed down to reveal each action being played in perfect synchronization with the song.

On November 23, 2017, OK Go released the music video for "Obsession". 567 printers were used to create a multicolored backdrop in the video.

=== Pandemic activities and legal dispute (2020–2023) ===
In early 2020, during the beginning of the COVID-19 pandemic, Kulash and his wife fell ill with the 2019 novel coronavirus. After his recovery, while the band members were following stay-at-home orders at their homes, they wrote and recorded "All Together Now" and filmed a video for it over two months as a tribute to the healthcare workers battling the infection. The song and video were released on May 12, 2020; proceeds went to Partners in Health. The band uploaded several alternate music videos for "All Together Now" on YouTube, including clips sent to them by fans.

In early 2021, the band released an acoustic cover of "This Will Be Our Year" by the Zombies, which they also covered in 2004.

In 2022 and early 2023, the band became involved in a legal dispute with Minnesota company Post Consumer Brands, which registered a trademark on the phrase "OK Go!" for a new line of portable breakfast cereals. A lawyer for the band cited a previous collaboration between OK Go and Post as evidence that the "namejacking" was most likely intentional. On May 31, 2023, OK Go and Post reached a settlement, which resulted in Post abandoning its registration of the "OK Go!" name.

=== And the Adjacent Possible (2024–present) ===
In November 2024, OK Go announced through their newsletter that they had finished recording their then-untitled fifth album, planned for release in early 2025. The album's title, And the Adjacent Possible, was announced alongside the release of the first video single from the album, "A Stone Only Rolls Downhill", on January 16, 2025. The album was released on April 11 of that year, along with a new music video for their song, "Love".

In late 2026, the band released a two-song single titled "On Bells". It featured two handbell remixes of their previous songs "Return" and "Shooting the Moon".

== Music videos ==
OK Go has earned fame for its creative and often low-budget music videos, most of which have been promoted through Internet video sharing sites such as YouTube. Many of these have become viral; the 2006 video for "Here It Goes Again", in which the band performed a complex routine on motorized treadmills, had received over 50 million views on YouTube four years later when EMI took it off the platform during a dispute with YouTube. The subsequent reposting had been viewed over 70 million times as of May 2026. The band's video for "Needing/Getting", funded by American car manufacturer company Chevrolet and released February 5, 2012, debuted during Super Bowl XLVI and within the year received more than 47 million views on YouTube. Samuel Bayer, who produced many music videos in the 1990s, said that OK Go's promotion of music videos on the Internet was akin to Nirvana's ushering in the grunge movement. Many of the videos use long or single-shot takes, which Salon's Matt Zoller Seitz claims "restore[s] a sense of wonder to the musical number by letting the performers' humanity shine through and allowing them to do their thing with a minimum of filmmaking interference". OK Go won the 14th Annual Webby Special Achievement Award for Film and Video Artist of the Year. The video for "This Too Shall Pass" was named both "Video of the Year" and "Best Rock Video" at the 3rd annual UK Music Video Awards. "This Too Shall Pass" won the LA Film Fest's Audience Award for Best Music Video, UK MVA Awards – Music Video of the Year Winner 2010, among others.

The band has worked with directors including Francis Lawrence, Olivier Gondry (brother of Michel Gondry), Brian L. Perkins, Scott Keiner, and Todd Sullivan. The videos have been screened and displayed at museums, art galleries, and film festivals around the world including the Guggenheim Museum, the Museum of the Moving Image, the Edinburgh International Film Festival, the Los Angeles County Museum of Art, the Los Angeles Film Festival, and the Saatchi & Saatchi New Director's Showcase.

In 2008, Damian Kulash said that the band had not produced the music videos as part of any overt "Machiavellian" marketing campaign. "In neither case did we think, 'A-ha, this will get people to buy our records.' It has always been our position that the reason you wind up in a rock band is you want to make stuff. You want to do creative things for a living." On the release of the band's video for "The Writing's on the Wall" in 2014, Kulash explained to Rolling Stone that the band continued to make such quirky videos following their success after "Here It Goes Again" because the band worried about being considered a one-hit wonder: "We could go in two directions: We could either try to out-cool it – try to out-run it like Radiohead did with 'Creep' – or just embrace it and go, OK, what really worked here."

== Other appearances ==
"Get Over It" is featured in the EA Sports video games Triple Play 2002 and Madden NFL 2003, while a censored version of "Don't Ask Me" is featured in MVP Baseball 2003 and as background to the transitions in the British TV show The Inbetweeners.

"Here It Goes Again" was featured in Rock Band, Guitar Hero 5, and SSX on Tour. "Do What You Want" was featured in a back-to-school television campaign for JCPenney and the video games EA Sports NHL 06, Guitar Hero: On Tour, and Burnout Revenge. "Invincible" was a theme song for ABC's Saturday Night Football for the 2006 season. The band's song "A Million Ways" was featured in Band Hero.

The band contributed a cover of the Zombies "This Will Be Our Year" as the lead track of Future Soundtrack for America, a political benefit album put out by Barsuk Records in the fall of 2004. Lead singer Damian Kulash wrote a how-to guide, "How Your Band Can Fire Bush", for bands hoping to help depose then-President George W. Bush.

After visiting New Orleans in 2006, the band recorded an EP with New Orleans funk rock band Bonerama, to raise money for musicians who were displaced by the 2005 Hurricane Katrina. The EP, You're Not Alone, was released on February 5, 2008.

In 2007, OK Go wrote the fight song for Chicago Fire S.C., a Major League Soccer (MLS) soccer team. The song was offered on the team's official website as a free download. That same year, OK Go covered the Pixies "Gigantic" for American Laundromat Records Dig for Fire: A Tribute to Pixies CD.

The band's song "Do What You Want" could also be heard on the in-game radio in the LucasArts published video game Thrillville: Off The Rails. "Here It Goes Again" is also featured in the minigame Stunt Rider.

In 2009, the band appeared as the wedding band Tastes Like Chicken in DreamWorks' I Love You, Man starring Paul Rudd and Jason Segel.

In April 2010, OK Go collaborated with Brett Doar of Syyn Labs to build a speciality Rube Goldberg Machine called "The Colbert Machine" for the band's appearance on The Colbert Report. At the end of the episode, the band performed "This Too Shall Pass" with host Stephen Colbert singing lead vocals. Later that year, the OK Go song "Here It Goes Again" was included in the soundtrack for the children's film Ramona and Beezus. The band also recorded a Simlish version of "This Too Shall Pass" for The Sims 3: Ambitions, an expansion pack for the Sims 3.

In 2011, OK Go were featured in the meta-documentary The Greatest Movie Ever Sold by Morgan Spurlock with the song "The Greatest Song I Ever Heard". In the film, Damian Kulash says: "Does that mean... Hold on, if we make the theme for The Greatest Movie Ever Sold, does that mean that we're the greatest rock band ever to write a theme song?" whereby Spurlock responds: "Absolutely."

On May 9, 2013, the band, through its label Paracadute, released "Say the Same Thing", a collaborative word guessing game app for iOS and Android in which two players attempt to guess the same word, by finding common points between two random starting words. The app, which was created by guitarist Andy Ross during the band's down time, is based on an improv game which the band plays together while on tour. The band advertised the app by releasing a comedic video that introduces and explains the game. On May 15, 2013, "Say the Same Thing" became the 50 billionth download in Apple's App Store.

OK Go also contributed a song to the 2015 film Hot Tub Time Machine 2, titled "You're a Fucking Nerd and No One Likes You".

In February 2015, the band was featured in a segment created to help children learn colors in a premiere for "The Cookie Thief", a Sesame Street movie special.

In March 2015, OK Go made a cameo appearance in the music video for "Pick Me Up" by Japanese electropop group Perfume, following Perfume's cameo appearance at the beginning of OK Go's "I Won't Let You Down".

In June 2019, the band was featured in the Ripley's Believe It or Not television program on the Travel Channel, showing the making of the music video for their song "The One Moment".

In 2021, the band recorded the theme for the Apple TV+ children's show Hello, Jack! The Kindness Show, entitled "Try a Little Act of Kindness", and appeared as themselves in the season finale.

A rendition of their song "This Too Shall Pass" titled "This Too Shall (Flash)" was included in the 2023 film The Flash.

The band composed a new original song titled "This" for the 2023 Apple TV movie The Beanie Bubble, directed by Kulash and his wife Kristin Gore. The single and associated video were released on July 21, 2023.

== Philanthropy ==
In 2007, the band released You're Not Alone, a charity EP whose proceeds raised money for musicians displaced by Hurricane Katrina. The successful EP, which helped purchase a home for New Orleans musician Al "Carnival Time" Johnson, was the most public example of the band's increasing interest in politics and social issues, as the campaign included promotional appearances on Late Night with David Letterman as well as charity concerts. Earlier examples of the band's activism include a ten-page PDF titled "How Your Band Can Fire Bush", which was written by Kulash and distributed on the band's website. Other efforts have included direct appeals to fans of the band via the band's email newsletter, auctioning themselves off on behalf of Sweet Relief Musician's Fund, and the Burrito Project in which the group enlisted fans to join them in handing out burritos to homeless people before concerts. In Chicago, the band partnered with the Inspiration Corporation, a local provider of services to the homeless. The band has played several high-profile political and charity events, including a Super Tuesday Voter Awareness show hosted by Stella in 2008, and a star-studded benefit in Los Angeles led by Frank Black, and including "Weird Al" Yankovic, Tenacious D, and others. Lead singer Damian Kulash has written op-eds in The New York Times on digital rights management and net neutrality, an issue he also testified about in front of the House Judiciary Antitrust Task Force about in March 2008, and also discussed with the FCC commissioner. The day after that meeting, it was announced that the Internet would be reclassified under Title 2 of the telecommunications act — one of the band's short-term goals, which the band members nodded to in their five-word Webby acceptance speech: "Fight for Net Neutrality now."

The band has also used the massive popularity of its videos to further its favored causes. Downloads of the "White Knuckles" video went to ASPCA and were earmarked for rural animal shelters, and the video itself ends with a call to support animal rescue. A marching band costume from "This Too Shall Pass" was auctioned off to feed the homeless and eleven of the signed Gretsch guitars and amplifiers used in "Needing/Getting" were sold to benefit the Fender Music Foundation, which provides instruments to music education programs.

OK Go has also allowed its music on benefit albums, most notably Dear New Orleans, a 31-song online compilation that benefits a variety of New Orleans organizations. Lyrics from the band's contribution, "Louisiana Land", reference a number of New Orleans personalities and institutions, which the New Orleans Times-Picayune called "indicative of just how deeply the members of OK Go waded into the local gestalt". and the Future Soundtrack for America, a compilation released by Barsuk Records that benefited MoveOn.org and Music for America, which included OK Go's cover of "This Will Be Our Year" by The Zombies.

On January 18, 2017, two days before Donald Trump was inaugurated as the 45th President of the United States, OK Go released a cover of the politically charged Morrissey song "Interesting Drug". The music video includes images of Trump and other prominent political figures as bad people and ends with a list of organizations the band recommends viewers support. Fans of the band had mixed reactions, prompting this status update on OK GO's Facebook page: "Morrissey Official wrote this song almost 30 years ago but it seems truer to us now than ever. The comments we’ve gotten over the past day are fascinating. We especially applaud those who disagree with us without abandoning civility or respect. You give us hope."

In recent years, OK Go has worked on OK Go Sandbox to create music videos and educational tools with the Playful Learning Lab (a partnership with the University of St. Thomas).

== Special appearances and tours ==
From 2002 to 2005, OK Go toured across North America and Europe on tours with the Vines, Phantom Planet, Superdrag, the Music, Fountains of Wayne, Kaiser Chiefs, the Redwalls, Brendan Benson, and She Wants Revenge.

On October 20, 2005, OK Go appeared on Good Morning America to teach and perform the dance from the "A Million Ways" video.

On December 31, 2005, the band performed surrounded by pyrotechnics and confetti on the Pontiac Garage Stage in New York City for the Times Square New Year's Eve Celebration.

In May 2006, OK Go toured with Panic! at the Disco; in September the band toured the UK supporting Motion City Soundtrack before returning to the United States to tour with Death Cab for Cutie in late 2006 and Snow Patrol in Spring 2007. In Summer 2007, OK Go opened for the Fray on its North American tour.

On February 4, 2008, OK Go headlined a fundraiser for the Barack Obama presidential campaign at Bowery Ballroom in New York City on the night before the Super Tuesday elections. The event was hosted by singer/songwriter Craig Wedren and the comedy group Stella.

On February 23, 2008, the band performed at the release party for Ben Karlin's collection of essays Things I've Learned From Women Who've Dumped Me at the Steve Allen Theater in Hollywood. Lead singer Damian Kulash contributed an essay for the collection, entitled "A Dog Is Not A Reason To Stay Together". Comedians Stephen Colbert, Will Forte, Andy Richter, Dan Savage, and Patton Oswalt also contributed essays to the collection.

From 2009 to 2011, OK Go headlined an extensive tour across North America, Europe, South America, and Asia in support of Of the Blue Colour of the Sky, including festival appearances at Kanrocksas Music Festival (Kansas City, Kansas, US), Festival Cultura Quente (Caldas de Reis, Spain), and Positivus Festival (Salacgrīva, Latvia).

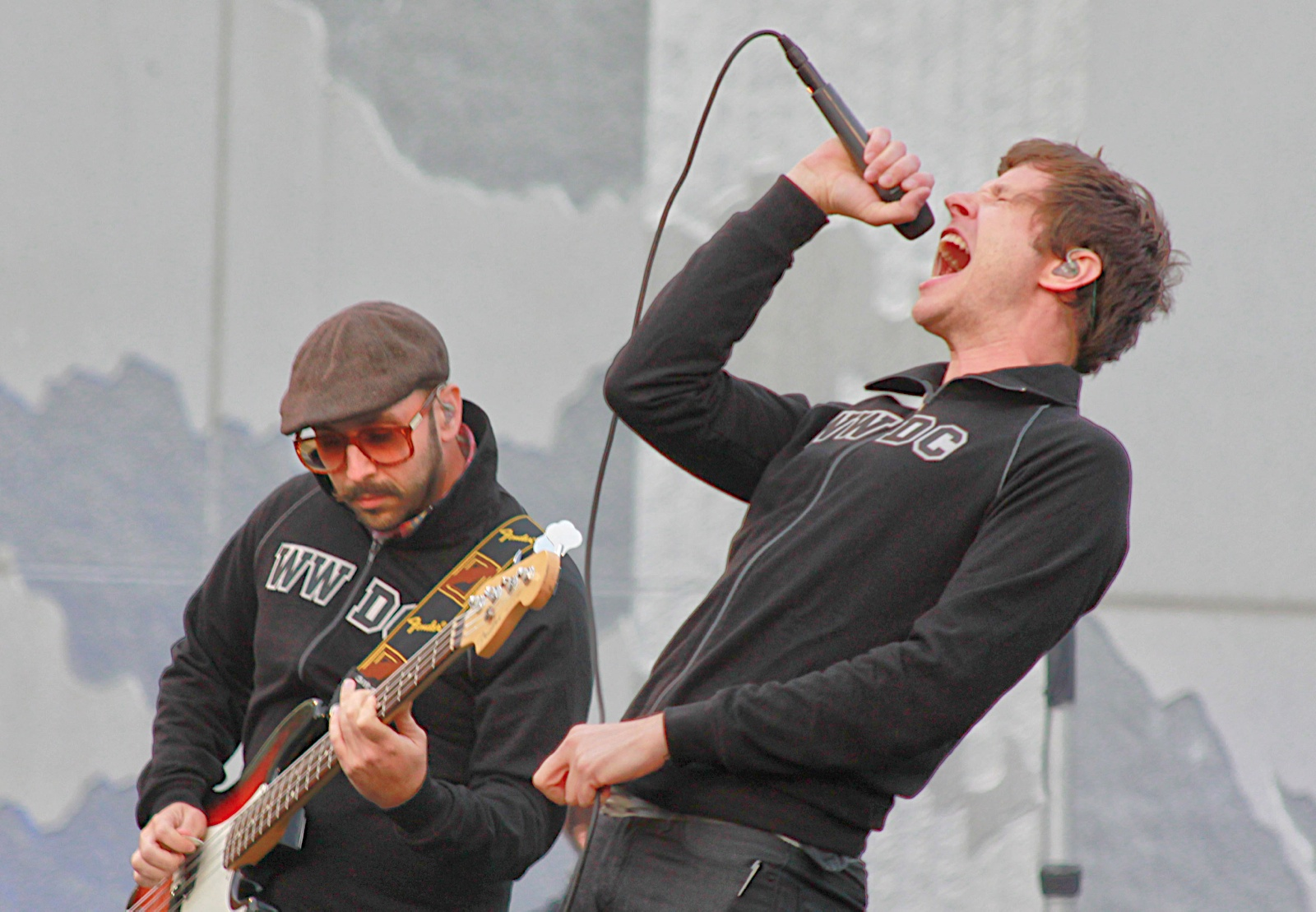
OK Go at 2010 WWDC Bash wearing conference jackets

On May 6, 2010, The Baltimore Sun reported that OK Go was selling USB flash drives with recordings of each show on the Spring 2010 US Tour

On May 23, 2010, the band performed live underwater on stage at Maker Faire in San Mateo California. The band members' heads were each submerged in water bubbles attached to breathing apparatuses for the duration of the performance, with lead singer Damian Kulash completely submerged in a tank of water.

On June 10, 2010, the band was the surprise musical guest at Apple Inc.'s 2010 World Wide Developers Conference.

In October 2010, OK Go performed acoustic versions of "White Knuckles", "Here It Goes Again", and "This Too Shall Pass", along with a handbell version of "Return", at the Poptech! Conference in Camden, Maine.

On November 17, 2010, OK Go visited the Today Show for a special Today Goes Viral series and helped hosts Ann Curry, Meredith Vieira, Matt Lauer, and Al Roker create a stop motion video set to "White Knuckles". In the video, the hosts were enclosed in glass containers filled with brightly colored ping pong balls.

On November 27, 2010, OK Go joined the Yo Gabba Gabba! Party In My City tour for a special guest performance at the Nokia Theatre in Los Angeles.

On June 23, 2011, the band gave a free concert at the John F. Kennedy Center for the Performing Arts, to celebrate the 14th anniversary of the Millennium Stage. During the show, the band performed "Return" on handbells. In advance of the performance, the Kennedy Center invited 15 Twitter followers and guests to film the show, in order to produce the organization's first crowd-sourced concert video.

On August 3, 2011, OK Go performed at then-United States President Barack Obama's 50th birthday party, along with musicians Jennifer Hudson and Herbie Hancock at the Aragon Ballroom in Chicago.

On August 10, 2011, the band did a live television performance of the dance the members created with Pilobolus for their "All Is Not Lost" interactive video on the NBC show America's Got Talent

On January 31, 2012, OK Go appeared on the children's television show Sesame Street in a video called "3 Primary Colors" meant to teach the young audience about red, yellow, blue, and the colors made when you mix them. "3 Primary Colors" was simultaneously released as a game on the Sesame Street website.

On May 10, 2012, OK Go was the featured band on This American Life Live!, a special performance of the show telecast live to movie theaters across the US and Canada. By downloading a smartphone app coded by guitarist Andy Ross, viewers were able to play along with the band's handbell performance of "Needing/Getting".

On Nov 23, 2016, OK Go performed "The One Moment" on The Late Show with Stephen Colbert.

On April 15, 2025, OK Go performed "Love" as a musical guest on The Late Show with Stephen Colbert.

== Musical style ==
OK Go's music style has generally been regarded as alternative rock, power pop, pop rock, indie rock, and indie pop.

== Members ==
Current

- Damian Kulash – lead vocals, rhythm guitar, keyboards, programming (1998–present)
- Tim Nordwind – bass, keyboards, backing vocals (1998–present)
- Dan Konopka – drums, percussion (1998–present)
- Andy Ross – lead guitar, keyboards, piano, backing vocals (2005–present)

Former

- Andy Duncan – lead guitar, keyboards, backing vocals (1998–2005)

== Discography ==
- OK Go (2002)
- Oh No (2005)
- Of the Blue Colour of the Sky (2010)
- Hungry Ghosts (2014)
- And the Adjacent Possible (2025)
