= OK Go videography =

The rock band OK Go has earned considerable fame for their creative but often low-budget music videos, most of which have been promoted through Internet video sharing sites like YouTube. Many of these have become viral videos; the 2006 video for "Here It Goes Again", in which the band performed a complex routine with the aid of motorized treadmills, has received over 50 million views four years later. Their video for "Needing/Getting", released February 5, 2012 in partnership with Chevrolet, debuted during Super Bowl XLVI and has over 32 million views on YouTube. Samuel Bayer, who produced many music videos in the 1990s, asserted that OK Go's promotion of music videos on the Internet was akin to Nirvana's ushering in the grunge movement. Many of the videos also use long or single-shot takes, which Salon's Matt Zoller Seitz says "restore[s] a sense of wonder to the musical number by letting the performers' humanity shine through and allowing them to do their thing with a minimum of filmmaking interference". The success of OK Go's music first won the band the 14th Annual Webby Special Achievement Award for Film and Video Artist of the Year. The video for "This Too Shall Pass" was named both "Video of the Year" and "Best Rock Video" at the 3rd annual UK Music Video Awards."This Too Shall Pass" won the LA Film Fest's Audience Award for Best Music Video, UK MVA Awards – Music Video of the Year Winner 2010, among others.

The band has worked with directors including Francis Lawrence, Olivier Gondry (brother of Michel Gondry), Brian L. Perkins, Scott Keiner, and Todd Sullivan. The videos have been screened and displayed at museums, art galleries, and film festivals around the world including The Guggenheim Museum, The Museum of the Moving Image, The Edinburgh International Film Festival, The Los Angeles County Museum of Art, The Los Angeles Film Festival, and the Saatchi & Saatchi New Director's Showcase.

In 2008, Damian Kulash said that the band had not produced the YouTube videos as part of any overt "Machiavellian" marketing campaign. "In neither case did we think, 'A-ha, this will get people to buy our records.' It has always been our position that the reason you wind up in a rock band is you want to make stuff. You want to do creative things for a living."

== Style ==
OK Go's distinctive, choreography-heavy performance style first originated from a 1999 appearance on the Chicago-based public television show "Chic-a-GoGo"; WBEZ radio personalities Peter Sagal, Jerome McDonnell of Worldview, Gretchen Helfrich (formerly of Odyssey) and Ira Glass pretended to play instruments to "C-C-C-Cinnamon Lips" as OK Go danced, because the band wasn't allowed to play live on the show. On August 31, 2006, OK Go appeared live at the 2006 MTV Video Music Awards performing their treadmill routine for "Here It Goes Again". On November 7, 2006, OK Go released a deluxe limited edition CD/DVD of the album Oh No. The DVD contains their music videos (dancing and playing instruments), a video of 180 fans performing the "A Million Ways" dance for a YouTube contest, previously unseen footage, and a behind-the-scenes look at their treadmill rehearsals for the "Here It Goes Again" video and for the MTV VMAs.

== Discography ==
Studio Albums

- OK Go (2002)
- Oh No (2005)
- Of the Blue Colour of the Sky (2010)
- Hungry Ghosts (2014)
- And the Adjacent Possible (2025)

== Videos ==
=== Videos from OK Go ===
==== "Get Over It" ====
- Released August 2002.
- Directed by Francis Lawrence.
- 6 million YouTube views
- The video features the band performing in a lodge while the camera settles on room details that interpret lyrics from the song.

==== "Don't Ask Me" ====
- Released 2003.
- Directed by Barnaby Roper.
- 2.2 million YouTube views
- The official video released by Capitol Records for "Don't Ask Me," the band's second single, features the band performing in a black and white room with a backup dancer. The video was edited to make it seem like there were multiple backup dancers.

==== "Don't Ask Me (Dance Booth)" ====
- Released 2003.
- Directed by Brian L. Perkins.
- 300,000 YouTube views
- This video features fans and band members dancing against a red background. It was filmed during the band's tour with The Vines by frequent collaborator Brian Perkins.

==== "You're So Damn Hot" ====
- Directed by Scott Keiner.
- 1.3 million YouTube views
- The music video for "You're So Damn Hot" shows various clips of the band on tour, back stage, on stage, meeting fans, etc.

==== "What To Do" ====
- 460,000 YouTube views
- Black & White, features a trombone player and woman sitting casually halfway-offscreen in addition to the band.

=== Videos from Oh No ===
==== "A Million Ways" ====
- Directed by OK Go, Choreographed by Trish Sie.
- 5.3 million YouTube views
- This simple video of the band practicing choreography in the lead singer's back yard became the band's first viral hit, even though it was not originally intended for public consumption. In a paper entitled "Here We Go Again: Music Videos After YouTube" Maura Edmond writes that the footage "became immensely popular on iFilm and other online video sites before the band had thought to use the footage specifically as a “music video” and before they had sought approval for the clip from their label." The video was screened at the Edinburgh International Film Festival in 2006.

==== "Here It Goes Again" ====
- Released July 31, 2006
- Co-directed by OK Go and Trish Sie.
- 59 million YouTube views
- The video for "Here It Goes Again" features the band performing an elaborately choreographed dance routine on eight treadmills set up in the home of director and choreographer Trish Sie. The band practiced the routine for a week before shooting the video, and kept the master copy on Damian Kulash's laptop for a year before releasing the video on YouTube. The original YouTube video was viewed by over one million people in the first six days after it was uploaded, and was viewed over 52 million times before it was removed from the band's channel, making it the 42nd most viewed YouTube video and the 29th most viewed music video. It is also YouTube's 7th most favorited video and the #1 most favorited music video of all time. The video became the most played video on MTV and VH1 in the United States, the most purchased video on iTunes in the United States and the UK, and the #2 video at MTV2 in the UK, and was featured in a Nike+iPod commercial in 2007. As of September 2017, the new upload has more than 37 million views. OK Go performed the "Here It Goes Again" routine live on treadmills at the 2006 MTV Video Music Awards, after spending a week rehearsing at the Alvin Ailey Dance Studios in Manhattan. The video won the 2006 YouTube Award for Most Creative Video and the 2007 Grammy Award for "Best Short-Form Music Video". In 2011, "Here It Goes Again" was named one of the 30 best music videos of all time by Time Magazine.

==== "Invincible" ====
- Co-directed by OK Go and Mike Barnett.
- 2.7 million YouTube views
- The music video for "Invincible" is a split-screen video. On the right side, the video shows OK Go playing the song. On the left side, the video shows various household objects exploding.

==== "Do What You Want" (Party Version) ====
- Directed by Olivier Gondry.
- For this performance-style video, director Olivier Gondry employed 28 different cameras to capture a frenetic party scene.

==== "Do What You Want" (Wallpaper Version) ====
- Co-directed by Damian Kulash, Mary Fagot, and James Frost.
- 3 million YouTube views
- The second video for Do What You Want featured the band members and a number of performers from Los Angeles fully covered in the wallpaper pattern that was featured on the cover of the band's second album. In a publicity stunt before the video's release, the band wore suits made of the wall paper pattern on the red carpet of the 2007 Grammy Awards.

=== Videos from Of the Blue Colour of the Sky ===
==== "WTF?" ====
- Released November 17, 2009.
- Co-directed by OK Go and Tim Nackashi.
- 5.2 million YouTube views
- "WTF?" was the first video released off of OK Go's third album Of the Blue Colour of the Sky. It is a single-shot music video filmed on a green screen, then edited to stack each frame filmed on top of the one before it, creating a psychedelic effect. In 2010, the band published a program made using Processing that allows users to recreate the effect seen in the video with a webcam.

==== "This Too Shall Pass" Official Video (Marching Band) ====
- Released January 8, 2010 featuring the University of Notre Dame's Band of the Fighting Irish.
- Co-directed by Damian Kulash and Brian Perkins.
- 14 million YouTube views
- OK Go's first video for "This Too Shall Pass" is a single-shot music video collaboration with 125 members of the University of Notre Dame's marching band and 50 students from Perley Elementary and Good Shepherd Montessori School in South Bend, Indiana. The video took 20 takes to complete correctly. The band contacted Notre Dame after seeing a YouTube clip of the marching band performing Here It Goes Again at a football game.

==== "This Too Shall Pass" Rube Goldberg Machine ====
- Released March 1, 2010 in partnership with State Farm Insurance.
- Co-directed by Damian Kulash and James Frost.
- 71 million YouTube views
- OK Go's second video for "This Too Shall Pass" is a music video of the band performing within an elaborate Rube Goldberg Machine built in a warehouse in the Echo Park area of Los Angeles. The video appears to be a single shot video, but the video actually shows 3 different takes (evidenced by members of the band appearing splattered in paint from previous takes). Production began in November 2009 and continued through two days of filming on February 11 & 12, 2010 with a total crew of 60 builders and production staff. The machine, which rolls metal balls down tracks, swings sledgehammers, pours water, unfurls flags, drops a flock of umbrellas from the second story, and shoots paint cannons at the band, was precisely designed to be synchronized with the song. The video took about 60 takes to be completed correctly, with one hour and a staff of 30 required to reset the machine between takes. This video was the 7th most-watched video of 2010, and as such was featured on the 2010 YouTube Rewind.

==== "End Love" ====
- Released July 14, 2010.
- Co-directed by Damian Kulash, Jeff Lieberman, and Eric Gunther.
- 24 million YouTube views
- "End Love" is a stop motion dance video filmed in one continuous 18-hour take and sped up in post-production. The video's choreography included OK Go sleeping overnight in the park where the video was filmed as cameras continued to roll. The band announced an open call for fans to participate in the video and a group of fan volunteers is featured at the end of the video. The video contains a range of frame-rate speeds, from one frame per second stop motion to super slow motion at 30 times the normal speed. During filming, a goose living in the park followed the band, and consequently shows up throughout the video. He was nicknamed "Orange Bill" by band members.

==== "White Knuckles" ====
- Released September 20, 2010.
- Co-directed by Damian Kulash and Trish Sie.
- 26 million YouTube views
- "White Knuckles" is a single-shot music video featuring OK Go dancing with 12 dogs (including lead singer Damian Kulash's dog Bunny Carlos.) The video is a collaboration with animal trainers Lauren Henry and Ronald Sonnenburg in association with Talented Animals. Despite the difficulty of shooting a single-shot video with animals ("For those of you who have never worked an animal on film, we use cuts and optimal camera angles for everything," Sonnenburg wrote on the Talented Animals blog) the band traveled to Oregon with 12 trainers, 12 dogs, one goat, two furniture movers, and the rest of the production team for four weeks of training, choreography, rehearsal, and filming. 124 takes were shot over three days of filming and take #72 became the final video. The video premiered on The Ellen Degeneres Show on September 20, 2010, and was performed by the band on The Tonight Show With Jay Leno later that night. The video was released in 3D on the Nintendo 3DS on April 10, 2013. The video also promotes animal rescue efforts, ending with the message: "These dogs were lucky to find loving homes, but many others are still waiting. Help us support animal rescue efforts at the ASPCA." The band announced that all proceeds from video sales would be donated to animal rescue efforts.

==== "Last Leaf" ====
- Released November 10, 2010 in partnership with Samsung NX100 iFn.
- Directed by OK Go, Nadeem Mazen, and Ali Mohammad.
- 5 million YouTube views
- "Last Leaf" is a stop motion animation video created using 2,430 pieces of toast laser-cut with designs by the band and artist Geoff Mcfetridge. Shot on a Samsung NX100 iFn camera, the video used 15 photos for every second of animation.

==== "Back From Kathmandu" ====
- Released December 12, 2010 in partnership with Range Rover.
- Directed by OK Go.
- 1.2M YouTube views
- In "Back From Kathmandu", OK Go led fans in a five-mile, 8-hour musical parade through the streets of Los Angeles. The video's concept was based on large-scale parades in New Orleans where large informal groups gather with instruments and march around the city. Guided by Range Rover's Pulse Of The City app, which lets users visualize journeys by using GPS technology, the parade's route created a giant geo-art OK GO sign on the city's streets.

==== "All Is Not Lost" ====
- Released July 25, 2011 in partnership with Google Chrome Japan and featuring Pilobolus.
- Directed by OK Go, Pilobolus, and Trish Sie.
- 3.3 million YouTube views
- All Is Not Lost is an HTML-5 enabled multi-window web application, which combines elaborate high-concept choreography with technology, to create a hybrid human-technology dance. In the video, dancers are shot from below performing on a clear plexiglass surface while wearing green unitards. During the course of the video, the dance is split into progressively more HTML5 windows, further expanding the number of possible interactions and movements for the dancers. The production team shot 12 separate films, all one continuous take. At the end, the video splits into 48 separate windows to spell out custom messages entered by users in English or Japanese. On July 27, 2011, the band launched a 3D version of the video on the Nintendo 3DS platform, which allows the viewing of 3D videos without the need for special glasses. The 3D version was created by filmmaker Eric Kurland, and is notable because the third dimension appears behind the screen instead of 'popping out' in front of it.

==== "Needing/Getting" ====
- Released February 5, 2012 in partnership with Chevrolet.
- Directed by Brian L. Perkins & Damian Kulash, Jr.
- 46.8 million YouTube views
- For "Needing/Getting," OK Go and Chevrolet outfitted a Chevy Sonic with retractable pneumatic arms set up to play over 1000 instruments as the car drove through a short desert track, recording a live "auto-acoustic" version of the song. The video was shot over four days after four months of preparation and design that included lead singer Damian Kulash taking stunt driving lessons. The video premiered on February 5, 2012 during the Super Bowl XLVI pregame show and was shown again during the game as part of Chevrolet's "Stunt Anthem" spot, which also featured the band fun. and skateboarder Rob Dyrdek.

==== "Skyscrapers" ====
- Released March 29, 2012.
- Directed by Trish Sie.
- 7 million YouTube views
- In the video, director Trish Sie dances the tango across a brightly colored landscape with partner Moti Buchboot. The video was released in 3D on the Nintendo 3DS on March 29, 2012.

=== Videos from Hungry Ghosts ===
==== "The Writing's On the Wall" ====
- Released June 17, 2014
- Directed by Damian Kulash, Jr., Aaron Duffy and Bob Partington
- 27 million views on YouTube
- This was the first video released off of OK Go's fourth album, Hungry Ghosts. It is a one-shot take where the camera is moved by the band through a warehouse setup with a number of stations consisting of common objects, clothes worn by the band, and painted surfaces, as to create optical illusions when the camera is in the correct position.

==== "I Won't Let You Down" ====
- Released October 27, 2014
- Directed by Damian Kulash, Jr., Kazuaki Seki
- 47.8 million views on YouTube
- A one-shot video with the band and over 2,300 dancers, many performing on personal mobility devices, performing elaborate routines while filmed by a drone-mounted camera to move between ground-level and bird's-eye view shots. The device that the group and a large number of dancers ride on is the Honda UNI-CUB. The video was filmed on a camera mounted to an octocopter drone. According to Kulash, concept, planning and practicing took about a month before it was shot. The entire video was shot in double time, and sped up during editing so as to assist the dancers in performing the complex choreography.

==== "Upside Down & Inside Out" ====
- Released February 13, 2016 in partnership with S7 Airlines
- Directed by Damian Kulash, Jr., Trish Sie
- 25 million views on YouTube
- An apparent one-shot video with the band performing the song aboard a reduced gravity aircraft, simulating periods of micro-gravity via parabolic flight. The video was shot in a single, 45 minute take but trimmed out portions during non-micro-gravity to the song's three-minute length.

==== "The One Moment" ====
- Released November 24, 2016 in partnership with Morton Salt
- Directed by Damian Kulash, Jr.
- 31 million views on YouTube
- The video consists of a one-shot video of a 4.2 seconds long series of 318 events slowed down to match the speed and rhythm of the song, followed by 16 seconds of lip-sync from Damian and is ended by another slow-motion scene. The video is supported by and is supporting Morton Salt's #WalkHerWalk campaign.

==== "Obsession" ====
- Released November 23, 2017 in partnership with Double A Paper
- Directed by Yusuke Tanaka, Damian Kulash, Jr., & Kristin Gore
- 20 million views on YouTube
- Made in partnership with Double A paper, the video is a time-accelerated single-take shot of the band dancing in concert with two walls of 567 desktop printers that were synchronized to print out colored paper sheets within 1mm accuracy, creating what the band called the first "paper mapping" video. All paper used was recycled, and all proceeds of the video went to Greenpeace.

=== Videos from And the Adjacent Possible ===
==== "A Stone Only Rolls Downhill" ====
- Release January 16, 2025
- Directed by Damian Kulash and Chris Buongiorno
- 2.6 million views on YouTube.
- The video consists of 64 separate continuous videos displayed across 64 mobile phone screens using mosaic effects.

==== "Love" ====
- Released April 11, 2025
- Directed by Damian Kulash, Aaron Duffy, and Miguel Espada
- 7 million views on YouTube.
- The one-shot video creates several kaleidoscope-like visual effects using mirrors manipulated by both the band members and Universal Robots robotic arms, shot in a historic Budapest train station. It took 39 takes to coordinate 60 people, 26 robotic arms, and 60 mirrors to get the single-shot take.
- Nominated for the Grammy Award for Best Music Video for the 68th Annual Grammy Awards.

==== "Impulse Purchase" ====
- Released September 3, 2025
- Directed by Lucas Zanotto and Will Anderson
- Video used a combination of Blender 3D animation coupled with face motion capture of the OK Go band members to animate the characters in the video. The video was inspired by lyric videos and Kulash's appreciation of Zanotto's short videos. All of the Blender project files were released under a Creative Commons license for others to reuse the models and scripting.

=== Special collaborations and non album-related videos ===
==== "Today Goes Viral" ====
- Released November 17, 2010.
- 573,000 views on YouTube
- For The Today Show's viral video week "Today Goes Viral", OK Go helped the show's hosts Meredith Vieira, Matt Lauer, Ann Curry, and Al Roker create a stop motion animation video in which the band pours brightly colored ping pong balls into the glass cases in which the hosts are standing.

==== "The Muppet Show Theme Song" ====
- Directed by Kirk Thatcher
- Released August 23, 2011.
- 13 million YouTube views
- OK Go's cover of The Muppet Show Theme Song was included alongside covers by Weezer, The Fray, My Morning Jacket, and Andrew Bird in Muppets: The Green Album, a tribute album released in 2011 in advance of the movie The Muppets. The video features OK Go and The Muppets recreating elements of several OK Go music videos including "Here It Goes Again", "White Knuckles", "This Too Shall Pass" and "All Is Not Lost." On August 31, 2011 OK Go performed the song with Animal (one of The Muppets) on The Tonight Show With Jay Leno. The band had previously appeared with Animal and Floyd Pepper, bassist of the Muppet band Dr. Teeth and the Electric Mayhem, at the 2010 Webby Awards where they recorded a comedic video of OK Go drummer Dan Konopka having a staring contest with Animal. The video also featured Zach Galifianakis.

==== "Primary Colors" ====
- Released January 31, 2012 on Sesame Street.
- Directed by Al Jarnow.
- 585 million views on YouTube
- For the band's appearance on Sesame Street, OK Go teamed up with Al Jarnow, an animator famous for the educational and experimental short films he created in the 1960s-1980s for Sesame Street and The Electric Company. In the video, OK Go teaches the viewers about red, yellow, blue, and the colors you get when you mix them while singing a children's song called "Primary Colors" they wrote specifically for the video. A video game based on "Primary Colors" was released on Sesame Street's website the day the episode aired.

==== "Saatchi and Saatchi Music Video Challenge 2013" ====
- Videos submitted by May 22, 2013, Winning video announced on June 6, 2013.
- Winning video directed by Nelson de Castro, People's Choice winner directed by BJ Golnick
- The winning video has 1.5 million YouTube views. The People's Choice winner has 140,000 YouTube views.
- In 2013, Saatchi and Saatchi announced that the subject for their 3rd Music Video Challenge would be OK Go's song, "I'm Not Through," from their 4th album, Hungry Ghosts. In the end, 12 finalists were selected: Eran Amir (Germany), Carolina Aguirre Barrandeguy (UK), Sara Brink (USA), Nelson de Castro (USA), Roberto Espinosa (USA), BJ Golnick (USA), Alice Lam (USA), Benjamin Minot & Jacqueline Bulnes (Italy), Shan Palmer (USA), Riccardo Salvi & Alberto Falcone (UK), Lavado Stubbs (Bahamas) and Jonah Sugden (UK). The winning video (which can be viewed here), was directed by Nelson de Castro. The winner of the People's Choice award was directed by BJ Golnick. It can be viewed here.

==== "OK Go: An NPR Tiny Desk Concert In 223 Takes" ====
- Released June 3, 2013 in partnership with NPR Music.
- Directed by Mito Habe-Evans and Todd Sullivan.
- 571,000 views on YouTube
- Shot in 223 takes over 2 days, the video chronicles NPR Music's move to a new office. OK Go begins to play "All Is Not Lost" from Of The Blue Colour Of The Sky in the old office and continues the same song while traveling with the furniture as it is shelved, transported, and reassembled in NPR's new office.

==== "All Together Now" ====
- Release May 12, 2020
- Directed by Damian Kulash, Jr. and Kristin Gore
- 1.4 million views on YouTube.
- Song and video dedicated to the frontline healthcare workers of the COVID-19 pandemic, with proceeds to the Partners in Health charity.
- Shot over two months from various footage from the individual members' homes during the stay-at-home orders.
