= List of awards and nominations received by OK Go =

OK Go is a Chicago, Illinois, rock band consisting of: Damian Kulash, Tim Nordwind, Dan Konopka, and Andy Ross (who replaced former member, Andy Duncan). Originally forming in 1998, the band became popular with the music video for their song "A Million Ways" off of their album Oh No. This music video was nominated for Best Video at the MTV Europe Music Awards, giving the band their first major award nomination. They gained wider critical recognition following the release of their single "Here It Goes Again", which earned them a Grammy for Best Music Video. Since then, the band has received various awards and nominations, especially for their music videos, which frequently attract critical acclaim.

== Awards ==
- Grammys:
  - Best Music Video (2007) for "Here It Goes Again"
- Cannes Lions International Festival of Creativity:
  - Gold Lion (2012) in Cyber - Best Video for "All Is Not Lost"
  - Gold Lion (2012) in Design - Design Typography for "All Is Not Lost"
  - Gold Lion (2012) in Film - Interactive for "All Is Not Lost"
  - Silver Lion (2012) in Cyber - Websites and Microsites Publications & Media for "All Is Not Lost"
  - Bronze Lion (2012) in Design - Online Digital Design for "All Is Not Lost"
  - Bronze Lion (2012) in Cyber - Best Digitally Led Integrated Campaign for "Needing/Getting"
  - Bronze Lion (2012) in Film Craft - Best Use of Music for "Needing/Getting"
  - Bronze Lion (2015) in Promo And Activation - Sponsorship or Partnership Campaigns for "I Won't Let You Down"
  - Silver Lion (2016) in Entertainment for Music - Excellence in Music Video for "Upside Down & Inside Out"
  - Silver Lion (2016) in Film - Branded Content & Entertainment for "Upside Down & Inside Out"
  - Bronze Lion (2016) in Film Craft - Achievement in Production for "Upside Down & Inside Out"
  - Gold Lion (2017) in Design - Video/Moving Images for "Upside Down & Inside Out"
  - Gold Lion (2017) in Design - Video/Moving Images for "The One Moment"
  - Gold Lion (2017) in Digital Craft - Video/Moving Images for "The One Moment"
  - Silver Lion (2017) in Film Craft - Production Design/Art Direction for "The One Moment"
  - Bronze Lion (2017) in Film - Viral Film for "The One Moment"
  - Bronze Lion (2017) in PR - Social Influencer Communication & Amplification for "The One Moment"
  - Bronze Lion (2017) in Film Craft - Direction for "The One Moment"
  - Gold Lion (2018) in Design/Digital Installations & Events for "Obsession"
  - Silver Lion (2018) in Design/Digital & Interactive / Social Engagement for "Obsession"
  - Silver Lion (2025) in Excellence in Music Video for "Love"
  - Bronze Lion (2025) in Excellence in Music Video for "A Stone Only Rolls Downhill"
- Smithsonian American Ingenuity Awards:
  - Ingenuity Award (2016) for Visual Arts
- Producers Guild of America:
  - Digital 25: Leaders In Emerging Entertainment (2010)
- ADFEST:
  - Silver Lotus (2011) in Film Craft for "Last Leaf"
  - Bronze Lotus (2011) in Cyber - Best Use of Viral for "Last Leaf"
  - Gold Lotus (2018) in Film for "Obsession"
  - Silver Lotus (2018) in Film Craft for "Obsession"
  - Silver Lotus (2018) in Interactive for "Obsession"
- CLIO Awards:
  - Gold Award (2013) in Music - Branded Entertainment & Content for "Needing/Getting"
  - Gold Award (2016) in Film - Music Videos - Brand for "Upside Down & Inside Out"
  - Silver Award (2016) in Film - Short Form - Product/Service for "Upside Down & Inside Out"
  - Silver Award (2016) in Innovation - Brand for "Upside Down & Inside Out"
  - Silver Award (2016) in Partnerships - Brand for "Upside Down & Inside Out"
  - Silver Award (2016) in Film Technique - Direction for "Upside Down & Inside Out"
  - Silver Award (2018) in Film Technique (Visual Effects) for "Obsession"
  - Silver Award (2018) in Digital/Mobile & Social Media Technique for "Obsession"
  - Bronze Award (2018) in Film/Short Form for "Obsession"
  - Bronze Award (2018) in Social Media/ Social Video for "Obsession"
  - Bronze Award (2018) in Branded Content/Film for "Obsession"
  - Bronze Award (2018) in Music for Branded Entertainment & Content for "Obsession"
  - Grand Award (2025) in Design Craft and Music Film & Video for "Love"
  - Gold Award (2025)in Music Video Direction for "Love"
  - Gold Award (2025)in Music Video Direction for "A Stone Only Rolls Downhill"
- A-List Awards:
  - Bronze (2012) in Film Advertising Craft Direction for "Needing/Getting"
  - Gold (2015) in Branded Entertainment Awards - Online Film for "I Won't Let You Down"
  - Silver (2015) in Branded Entertainment Awards - Interactive for "I Won't Let You Down"
- Los Angeles Film Festival:
  - Best Music Video (2010) for "This Too Shall Pass"
- UK Music Video Awards:
  - Video Of The Year (2010) for "This Too Shall Pass"
  - Best Rock Video (2010) for "This Too Shall Pass"
  - Best Art Direction & Design in a Video in Association with Creative Commission for "The Writing's on the Wall
  - Best Rock Video International for "Love"
  - Icon Award recipient "Damian Kulash
- Eurobest European Advertising Festival:
  - Gold (2016) in Film Craft for "Upside Down & Inside Out"
  - Bronze (2016) in Entertainment for "Upside Down & Inside Out"
- Prague International Advertising Festival:
  - Gold (2016) in Creative Use of Technologies for "Upside Down & Inside Out"
  - Gold (2016) in Brilliant Execution for "Upside Down & Inside Out"
- Webby Awards:
  - Special Achievement Award (2010): Film & Video Artist Of The Year
  - People's Voice Award (2012): Online Film & Video - Viral for "The Muppet Show Theme"
  - Online Film & Video - Long Form (Branded) (2015) for "I Won't Let You Down" (nominated)
  - People's Voice Award (2018): Film & Video - Music Video for "Obsession"
- Public Knowledge IP3 Award:
  - IP3 Award (2007)
- YouTube Music Awards:
  - Most Creative Video (2006) for "Here It Goes Again"
  - Mind-Bending Visuals (2015) for "I Won't Let You Down"
- MTV Video Music Awards:
  - Best Visual Effects (2014) for "The Writing's on the Wall"
  - Best Choreography (2015) for "I Won't Let You Down
- MTV Video Music Awards Japan:
  - Best Group Video (International) (2015) for "I Won't Let You Down
- One Show Awards:
  - Gold Pencil (2012) in Online Films & Video - Music Videos for "All Is Not Lost"
  - Bronze Pencil (2012) in Branded Content - Music Videos for "Needing/Getting"
  - Merit (2012) in Craft - Interface Design for "All Is Not Lost"
  - Gold Pencil (2015) in Websites - Travel, Entertainment & Leisure for "I Won't Let You Down
  - Silver Pencil (2015) in Online Films & Video - Music Videos for "I Won't Let You Down
  - Gold Pencil (2017) in Innovation in Film - Online for "The One Moment
  - Bronze Pencil (2017) in Music Videos for "The One Moment
  - Bronze Pencil (2017) in Craft - Use of Visuals for "The One Moment
  - Merit (2017) in Craft - Innovation in Moving Image for "The One Moment
  - Merit (2017) in Craft - Direction for "The One Moment
  - Merit (2017) in Craft - Cinematography for "The One Moment
  - Merit (2017) in Innovation in Branded Entertainment for "The One Moment
  - Silver (2018) in Craft - Innovation in Moving Image Craft/Visual for "Obsession"
  - Bronze (2018) in Moving Image / Single for "Obsession"
  - Merit (2018) in Craft - Direction / Single for "Obsession"
- Epica Awards:
  - Gold (2016) in Direction & Cinematography for "Upside Down & Inside Out"
  - Bronze (2016) in Online Campaigns - Consumer Services & Households for "Upside Down & Inside Out"
- ACC CM Festival (Japan):
  - Grand Prix (2015) in Film B for "I Won't Let You Down
- D&AD Awards:
  - Graphite Pencil (2012) in Digital Advertising - Campaign Sites for "All Is Not Lost"
  - Graphite Pencil (2013) in TV & Cinema Advertising - Long Form Branded Content for "Needing/Getting"
  - Wood Pencil (2013) in Film Advertising Crafts - Use of Music for Film Advertising for "Needing/Getting"
  - Wood Pencil (2015) in Music Videos - Production Design for "The Writing's on the Wall
  - Wood Pencil (2016) in Branded Content & Entertainment - Fiction 1-5 mins for "Upside Down & Inside Out"
  - Wood Pencil (2017) in Music Videos - Direction for "The One Moment"
  - Graphite Pencil (2018) in Film Advertising Crafts - Production Design for Film Advertising for "Obsession"
  - Wood Pencil (2018) in Branded Content & Entertainment/Sponsored for "Obsession"
  - Wood Pencil (2018) in Film Advertising Crafts/Direction - Film Advertising for "Obsession"
  - Wood Pencil (2018) in Music Videos/Direction for Music Videos for "Obsession"
- AICP Awards:
  - Show (2016) in Production for "Upside Down & Inside Out"
  - Show (2017) in Production for "The One Moment"
  - Next Award (2010) in Viral/Web Film for "This Too Shall Pass"
  - Next Award (2016) in Viral/Web Film for "Upside Down & Inside Out"
  - Next Award (2016) in Branded Content for "Upside Down & Inside Out"
- Spikes Asia:
  - Gold Spike (2015) in Film - Branded Content & Entertainment for "I Won't Let You Down
  - Gold Spike (2015) in Film Craft - Achievement in Production for "I Won't Let You Down
  - Silver Spike (2015) in Branded Content & Entertainment - Original Use of Music for "I Won't Let You Down
  - Silver Spike (2015) in Media - Use of Branded Content & Sponsorship for "I Won't Let You Down
  - Bronze Spike (2015) in Digital - Social Video for "I Won't Let You Down
  - Grand Prix (2018) in Digital Craft/Technological Achievement in Digital Craft for "Obsession"
  - Gold Spike (2018) in Film Craft/Production Design / Art Direction for "Obsession"
  - Gold Spike (2018) in Design/Digital & Interactive Design for "Obsession"
  - Gold Spike (2018) in Digital - Brand / Product Video for "Obsession"
  - Silver Spike (2018) in Digital/Influencer - Talent for "Obsession"
  - Silver Spike (2018) in Film Craft/Visual Effects for "Obsession"
  - Silver Spike (2018) in Film/Consumer Durables for "Obsession"
  - Bronze Spike (2018) in Film Craft/Direction for "Obsession
  - Bronze Spike (2018) in Film Craft - Use of Original Music for "Obsession
- Golden Drum Awards:
  - Gold (2016) in Film - Online Films for "Upside Down & Inside Out"
  - Silver (2016) in New or Innovative for "Upside Down & Inside Out"
  - Silver (2016) in Branded Content for "Upside Down & Inside Out"
- London International Awards:
  - Silver (2015) in Music Video Cinematography for "I Won't Let You Down
- FWA Awards:
  - Site of the Day (Nov 24, 2015) for "I Won't Let You Down
- Code Awards:
  - Best Craft (2015) for "I Won't Let You Down
- NYC Drone Film Festival:
  - Best of X-Factor Category (2015) for "I Won't Let You Down
- Japan Media Arts Festival:
  - Jury Selection (2015) - Entertainment Division for "I Won't Let You Down
- Good Design Award (Japan):
  - Good Design Award (2015) - Publicity, Advertisement and Media Contents for "I Won't Let You Down
- Space Shower Music Video Awards:
  - Special Prize (2015) for "I Won't Let You Down
- Soundie Awards:
  - Best Creativity / Screenplay (2017) for "The One Moment"
- ACC Tokyo Creativity Awards
  - Gold (2018) in Branded Communication B for "Obsession"
  - Silver (2018) in Film B for "Obsession"
  - Bronze (2018) in Branded Communication D for "Obsession"
- New York Festivals Advertising Awards
  - First Prize Award (2018) in Film - Cinema/Online/ TV: Products & Services for "Obsession"
  - Second Prize Award (2018) in Branded Entertainment: Craft for "Obsession"
  - Second Prize Award (2018) in Branded Entertainment: Products & Services for "Obsession"
  - Third Prize Award (2018) in Digital (Cyber) Communications: Viral for "Obsession"
  - Third Prize Award (2018) in Film: Craft/Art Direction for "Obsession"
  - Third Prize Award (2018) in Film: Craft/Best Production Value for "Obsession"
- Ars Independent Festival Awards
  - Black Horse of Music Video (2025) for "Love"

== Nominations ==
- Grammy:
  - Best Music Video (2012) for "All Is Not Lost"
  - Best Music Video (2017) for "Upside Down & Inside Out"
  - Best Music Video (2026) for "Love"
  - Best Recording Package (2026) for "And the Adjacent Possible"
- Webby Awards:
  - Interactive Advertising & Media - Viral Marketing (2011) for "This Too Shall Pass"
  - Online Film & Video - Music (2012) for "The Muppet Show Theme" (Honoree)
  - Online Film & Video - Music (2013) for "Needing/Getting (Honoree)"
  - Online Film & Video - Music (2015) for "I Won't Let You Down
- SXSW Interactive Awards:
  - Interactive Awards Finalist (2013) in Music for "Needing/Getting"
- MTV Europe Music Awards:
  - Best Video (2006) for "A Million Ways"
- MTV Video Music Awards
  - Best Video (That Should Have Won a Moon Man) (2009) for "Here It Goes Again"
  - Best Direction (2014) for "The Writing's on the Wall"
- Cannes Lions International Festival of Creativity:
  - Shortlisted (2018) in Digital Craft Lions/ Motion Graphics Design & Animation for "Obsession"
  - Shortlisted (2018) in Digital Craft Lions/ Video / Moving Image for "Obsession"
  - Shortlisted (2018) in Entertainment Lions for Music/Brand or Product Integration into Music Content for "Obsession"
  - Shortlisted (2018) in Entertainment Lions for Music/Excellence in Music / Brand Partnership for "Obsession"
  - Shortlisted (2018) in Film Craft Lions/Direction for "Obsession"
  - Shortlisted (2018) in Film Craft Lions/Innovation in Production for "Obsession"
  - Shortlisted (2018) in Film Craft Lions/Visual Effects for "Obsession"
  - Shortlisted (2018) in Social & Influencer Lions/Content Creation for "Obsession
  - Shortlisted (2018) in Social & Influencer Lions/Content Marketing /Social Video for "Obsession"
- CLIO Awards:
  - Shortlist (2018) in use of Music/Innovation for "Obsession"
- Berlin Music Video
  - Nominated (2025) in Best Experimental for "A Stone Only Rolls Downhill"
- Spikes Asia:
  - Shortlist (2018) in Design/Motion Graphics Design & Animation for "Obsession"
  - Shortlist (2018) in Entertainment/Excellence in Brand or Product Integration into Existing Content for "Obsession
  - Shortlist (2018) in Music/Excellence in Music Video for "Obsession
- AdFest:
  - Finalist (2018) in Branded Content for "Obsession"
  - Finalist (2018) in Film Craft for "Obsession"
