= White-knuckle =

white-knuckle is an idiom that means causing fear, excitement, apprehension, suspense, or nervousness, for example, a "white-knuckle" amusement ride.

It can also refer to:

- "White Knuckle Ride", a 2010 song by British alternative group Jamiroquai
- "White Knuckles", a 2010 song by alternative rock band OK Go
  - "White Knuckles", a related music video
- Nintendo: White Knuckle Scorin', a 1991 compilation album released by Nintendo
- White Knuckle, a novel by Eric Red
- "A White-Knuckle Panic", an episode of Chicago Fire
- "White Knuckle", an episode of Chicago P.D.
- "White Knuckle Angel Face", a song by Elijah Blue Allman
- "White Knuckles", a song on the 2016 Love You to Death by Tegan and Sara
- "White Knuckle", a 2025 video game
- White-knuckled wolf spider or Aulonia albimana
