= Needing/Getting =

Single by OK Go

from the album Of the Blue Colour of the Sky
- B-side: Needing/Getting (More Than You Could Know) [Demo]; Needing/Getting [Live At Club Nokia: Los Angeles, CA, 11/27/10]
- Released: February 5, 2012
- Recorded: 2009
- Genre: Alternative rock; power pop
- Length: 5:14
- Label: Paracadute
- Songwriters: Damian Kulash; Tim Nordwind
- Producer: Dave Fridmann

OK Go singles chronology
"All Is Not Lost" (2011)	"Needing/Getting" (2012)	"The Writing's on the Wall" (2014)

"Needing/Getting" is a song by American rock band OK Go, from their 2010 album Of the Blue Colour of the Sky. A music video, released in February 2012 as an advertisement for Super Bowl XLVI, features the band performing the song by driving a Chevy Sonic through a rally car course, striking musical instruments on the sides of the course with extensions from the car to create the music.

== Song ==
"Needing/Getting" was written by band members Damian Kulash and Tim Nordwind, and was originally released as the fourth track of their 2010 album Of the Blue Colour of the Sky. The lyrics reflect a person who wishes to be in a relationship with someone who is not interested and expresses the foolishness of waiting around for that person to like you back. The song is in 6/8 except for the solo and closing sections, which are in 7/8.

Paste described the song musically as "dirt-smudged" with "its odd street-noise sound effects", and states that the song "unexpectedly works" with these elements. NME described the song as the "splicing of pervy pop with punch-drunk sea-shanties", and considered it "pleasing enough" and a highlight of a relatively mediocre album. The Boston Globe believed the band was "trying too hard to distance itself from its pop roots and be taken seriously" with the "artsy guitar fuzz" of the song.

== Music video ==
The music video for "Needing/Getting" was released in February 2012 and was directed by Brian L. Perkins, who had previously directed the band's Marching Band version of the "This Too Shall Pass" music video. The video is sponsored by Chevrolet, and features their Sonic. Within the video, the car, having been outfitted with numerous pneumatic arms and devices, is driven through a specially designed rally car course by the band's lead singer Damian Kulash, with the other band members as passengers. During the course, the arms strike at various musical instruments aligned on the sides of the course, including pianos, guitars, glass jars, and plastic drums; the arrangement and tuning of these instruments create the melody of the song as the car drives by them. The video premiered on MTV on February 5, with an edited version shown during Super Bowl XLVI the same day.

The idea for the video was inspired by the Rube Goldberg video version of "This Too Shall Pass"; in that video, some of the props of the Rube Goldberg machine had played a melody in time with the music. Kulash wanted to extend this idea, making the props in the video be the source of the music during the recording; he explained "I like the idea of doing videos that are live recordings. It helps break down the idea that these are all distinct forms of art." Using a car to make the music had also been an idea toyed by the band, but recognized that such would require monetary investment for the car and other factors. Initially, Kulash had the idea of driving a car on an oval racetrack with banked turns, with the action of running the car over the instruments making the music, but in the light of the aspiration to have a one-take run, this was deemed too difficult. The concept of a rally car course bore out from this idea, using the various stages of the course to map to certain stanzas of the song.

During the chorus sections of the song, Kulash drove the Sonic through a tunnel outfitted with several homemade instruments, including pipes, drums, hubcaps, and glass jars, with pneumatic arms and extensions from the car used to strike these to generate the video's music.

Kulash then approached various automobile manufacturers; in the case of Chevrolet, Perkins, a close friend of Kulash and the band, was working at one of the auto manufacturer's press agencies, and was able to let the band know that the company was looking for new advertisement ideas, ultimately leading to securing the video concept with Chevrolet. Kevin Mayer, Chevrolet's director of advertising, felt OK Go's influence with young adults through their past music videos was a close fit with the Sonic. Though the company provided between $500,000 and $1 million for the production of the video, they did not make any production demands on the band outside of limiting what modifications could be performed on the cars themselves; any further involvement or demands, according to Mayer, would have likely altered the impact of the video. Kulash noted that while such coordination with a commercial interest in the music industry was once seen in the past as "absolutely toxic", the industry has shifted to create new avenues that may be vital to remain significant. However, remaining in creative control of the product was considered key to the sponsorship; as Kulash stated "Being able to chase our ideas in any direction has been incredibly, incredibly freeing." He further praised Chevrolet for allowing the work to be produced without excessive marketing, noting that the band was surprised that "Chevy had the balls to go for it". Forbes magazine noted that this was not the first corporate sponsorship by OK Go, having had the creation of the videos for "This Too Shall Pass" (Rube Goldberg version) and "Last Leaf" sponsored by State Farm Insurance and Samsung, respectively.

Chevy's contributions included providing 2 Sonics, including the modifications to add extender bars and pneumatics, warehouse space for the band and an acoustic engineer to work out what would make suitable instruments and how they could be played by the car over the course of two months, and sending Kulash to a three-day stunt driving school to avoid having to use stunt doubles during filming. The video was filmed in a 2-mile long course on a private ranch property between Los Angeles and the Mojave Desert over a four-day period. The course as constructed included more than 1,100 homemade instruments and real instruments including 55 upright pianos and 288 electric guitars connected to 66 amps. The band developed a computer program that would dictate the speed that Kulash had to drive the car through the course to match the rhythm of the song; the speeds varied between 17 and 35 miles per hour on various sections of the course. This was aided with the use of a metronome within the car, and a series of marked beanbags that dropped as he drove through the course. Multiple takes were required to perfect the run; they would often have to replace the extender arms as they broke off from overuse. They also suffered from high Santa Ana winds that would tip over the instruments such as the pianos; though they completed several takes, the band recognized they would likely need to post-edit the various shots to make the complete final video.

The video, uploaded to YouTube after airing during the Super Bowl, received 5 million views within the day, and surpassed 13 million views in under two weeks. Wired magazine's Curtis Silver felt the video took the "mediocre" track from the album into "an experience that enhances the song and provides more than just a listening experience". Kulash as well as some journalists had speculated that OK Go would have suffered backlash from fans for "selling out" to commercial interests with the videos, but found that this did not occur, and the video generally praised for keeping the product as a "co-star" alongside the band instead of overemphasizing the brand.
