= X-TRA =

Contemporary art journal

X-TRA Contemporary Art Journal
- Executive Editor: Elizabeth Pulsinelli
- Executive Director: Shana Lutker
- Managing Editor: Poppy Coles
- Online Editor: Travis Diehl
- Categories: Art magazine, visual art
- Frequency: Bi-Annual
- Circulation: est. 28,000
- Publisher: Project X Foundation for Art and Criticism
- Founder: Stephen Berens, Ellen Birrell
- Founded: 1997
- First issue: Spring 1997
- Company: Project X Foundation for Art and Criticism
- Country: USA
- Based in: Los Angeles
- Language: English
- Website: x-traonline.org
- ISSN: 1937-5069

X-TRA Contemporary Art Journal (X-TRA) is an independent visual arts journal that focuses on criticism and conversation about contemporary art. X-TRA was founded in Los Angeles in 1997 by artists Stephen Berens and Ellen Birrell and is published twice a year by the non-profit Project X Foundation for Art and Criticism. The magazine is the longest running art publication in Los Angeles.

X-TRA journal publishes features, reviews, columns, interviews, and artist projects. The artist-driven magazine produces exclusive online content and public programs in addition to its print publication. X-TRA's audience includes a broad range of practicing artists, art curators, art dealers, critics and writers, the general art audience, and students.

== History ==
=== 1990's–1997: Early years and first publication ===
In Los Angeles in the late '90s, friends and artists Stephen Berens and Ellen Birrell formed Project X, an art curatorial collective. To accompany each exhibition organized by Project X, the group printed newsprint exhibition catalogs that documented the exhibitions and included additional essays and images of interest.

Noticing the lack of lasting art publications in Los Angeles and limited sources of art criticism outside of the mainstream, Berens and Birrell evolved the scope of Project X to include X-TRA, a publication intended to diversify and broaden the dialogue around contemporary art in LA. Berens and Birrell published the first issue of X-TRA in spring of 1997 with co-founders Jan Tümlir and Jérôme Saint-Loubert Bié. From its initiation, X-TRA has worked collaboratively through an editorial board of volunteer artists and writers.

=== 2002–present: Project X Foundation and funding ===
In 2002, artist and X-TRA publisher Jeff Beall helped create the Project X Foundation for Art and Criticism, a 501c3 non-profit organization, to fund and publish the quarterly magazine. Artist Shana Lutker currently serves as the Executive Director of Project X.

Once surviving on little to no budget, X-TRA is now the recipient of grants from foundations and organization including the Andy Warhol Foundation for the Visual Arts (2007), National Endowment of the Arts, City of Los Angeles Department of Cultural Affairs, Los Angeles County Board of Supervisors through the Los Angeles County Arts Commission, Mike Kelley Foundation for the Arts, the Getty Foundation, and the Pasadena Art Alliance.

=== 2020–present ===
In 2020, X-TRA changed from a quarterly to bi-annual schedule, starting with Spring/Summer 2021, Volume 23 Number 2.

=== Title ===
According to Birrell, the magazine's unique spelling of "extra" stems from an idea of only publishing "an issue when [the editors] had a great piece of writing to run, that it would be an extra edition to a publication that didn't otherwise exist."

== Executive Editors ==
- Elizabeth Pulsinelli (2007–)
- Founding editors: Stephen Berens, Ellen Birrell, and Jan Tümlir (Spring 1997–2007)

== Events ==
X-TRA hosts a range of events, supplementing the journal with programming to enhance community building. Some examples include:

- Andrea Fraser lecture at ICA LA, a commissioned lecture in combination with Fraser's essay, "Toward a Reflexive Resistance," in X-TRA. The program was part of X-TRA's Artist Writes series. March 11, 2018.
- Pope.L Reading at The Underground Museum, Los Angeles, a reading of Pope.L's commissioned essay for X-TRA, "The Cypress," as a part of X-TRA's Artist Writes series. August 9, 2019.
- Screening and Conversation with Aria Dean, Erin Chrisotvale, and Ulysses Jenkins at Human Resources Los Angeles, a conversation following a screening of work by Ulysses Jenkins. January 18, 2017.
- Chinese Cocktail, a concert by Robert Wilhite at the Barnsdall Gallery Theatre as part of the Pacific Standard Time Performance and Public Art Festival organized by the Getty Foundation and LAXART. January 24, 2012
- "Kitchen Table", reprise, a re-imagining of the series of conversations organized by Eugenia P. Butler in 1993 at the ART/LA art fair. Situated within the College Art Association Conference at the same LA Convention Center that was the site for the '93 talks, these talks brought together a group of cultural thinkers—primarily artists—seated around a table over lunch to speak freely about art, politics, and whatever come to the fore. February 22–24, 2012.
- X-TRA has staged five 1 IMAGE 1 MINUTE events, most recently at the LA Art Book Fair in 2015. Based on the artist Agnès Varda's series for French television in which members of the art community were invited on stage to speak for one minute about an image of their choosing. This event references a column of the same name, conceived by Micol Hebron, which ran in X-TRA from 2006 to 2010.
