= Trish Sie =

American film and music video director (born 1971)

- Born: Patricia Mary Kulash; Washington, D.C., U.S.
- Education: University of Pennsylvania
- Occupations: Director; choreographer
- Years active: 1994–present
- Spouse: Roe Sie
- Children: 2
- Relatives: Damian Kulash (brother)
- Website: bigbadtrish.com

Patricia Mary Sie (née Kulash) is an American film and music video director, best known for directing the films Step Up: All In (2014) and Pitch Perfect 3 (2017), as well as music videos, particularly for the alternative rock band OK Go. She has worked in film, television, commercials, music videos, stage, children's entertainment and ballroom DanceSport.

== Life and career ==
Sie was born in Washington, D.C. She graduated from National Cathedral School and, as a teenager, attended the National Music Camp at Interlochen Center for the Arts. She has a degree in music theory and composition from the University of Pennsylvania and was a member of Penn Dance Company. After graduating in 1994, she became a professional championship ballroom dancer and a well-known choreographer. She moved to Orlando, Fla., where she opened the Zebra Room Dance Studios and organized an arts collective called the Exchange.

Other projects include concepts, directing, and choreography for OK Go, Pilobolus Dance Theatre, Rufus Wainwright, Miranda July, Bobcat Goldthwait, Matt Harding, the Imagination Movers, ESPN, Jason Hill, and various DanceSport champions. Sie is also the creator, composer, and writer of the musical science-based children's show, The Snark-a-Snoops, based in Los Angeles. She directs music videos, commercials, and films. She is based in Los Angeles.

=== Music videography with OK Go ===
Sie has been involved in the creation of numerous music videos for the alternative rock band OK Go — fronted by her brother Damian Kulash — starting with the music video for "A Million Ways". The viral music video, filmed by the band in Kulash's back yard, was nominated for Best Music Video at the 2006 MTV Europe Music Awards.

The next music video that she did with the band, also OK Go's most popular one, was "Here It Goes Again" which she created, choreographed, produced and directed with the band in 2006. The "treadmill dance" video was inspired, she said in 2010, by her noticing that "people were marching sort of in sync on their treadmills. ... [I]t was like they were all in this unwitting choreography together." The video, which has had over 69 million plays on YouTube since being posted in July 2006, was performed live at the 2006 MTV Video Music Awards and won a 2007 Grammy Award for best short-form music video. Sie conceived the idea for the treadmill video, and she and the band shot it at her home dance studio using a friend's borrowed video camera.

In 2010, Sie teamed up again with OK Go to create, direct and choreograph the music video for "White Knuckles". The video in yet another single uninterrupted shot, has the band dancing with 12 trained (and rescued) dogs, a variety of furniture pieces and one goat. The video, which garnered more than a million hits in the first 24 hours after it was posted online, has its proceeds from the project benefit the ASPCA's animal rescue efforts.

In 2011, Sie teamed up with OK Go and modern dance troupe Pilobolus for the song "All Is Not Lost", which features the band and members of the troupe in blue leotards crawling, wiggling and tumbling across a glass surface while the camera beneath looks upward toward the ceiling. The video was released as an interactive HTML5 application designed for the Google Chrome Experiment. The HTML5 version was posted to website "allisnotlo.st" in addition to a traditional video posted on YouTube. The interactive HTML5 version allows the user to enter a custom message that is embedded into the finale of the video. The video has been nominated for a Grammy Award in 2012 in the category of Best Short Form Music Video. She also participated in Phoenixville TEDx conference during 2011.

In 2012, Sie conceived the idea for the music video for "Skyscrapers", a song off the OK Go album Of the Blue Colour of the Sky, which incorporates the tango also performed by Sie. The Skyscrapers video was adapted for the stage by Sie and Pilobolus and premiered at the Joyce Theatre in New York City, July 2012.

In 2016, she directed the music video for OK Go's "Upside Down & Inside Out," which was shot entirely in weightlessness aboard a Russian aircraft simulating zero gravity by flying in parabolic maneuvers. Sie has called this "her most ambitious and challenging project yet." The video garnered more than 25 million views in its first day online on Facebook as well as Trish's third Grammy nomination and the Smithsonian Magazine's Ingenuity Award.

== Filmography ==
Choreographer

- The Future (2011) (Additional choreographer)
- God Bless America (2011)

Director

- Step Up: All In (2014)
- Pitch Perfect 3 (2017)
- Kirby Buckets (2017) (2 episodes)
- The Sleepover (2020)
- Sitting in Bars with Cake (2023)
- Players (2024)
