= I Won't Let You Down (OK Go song) =

2014 single by OK Go

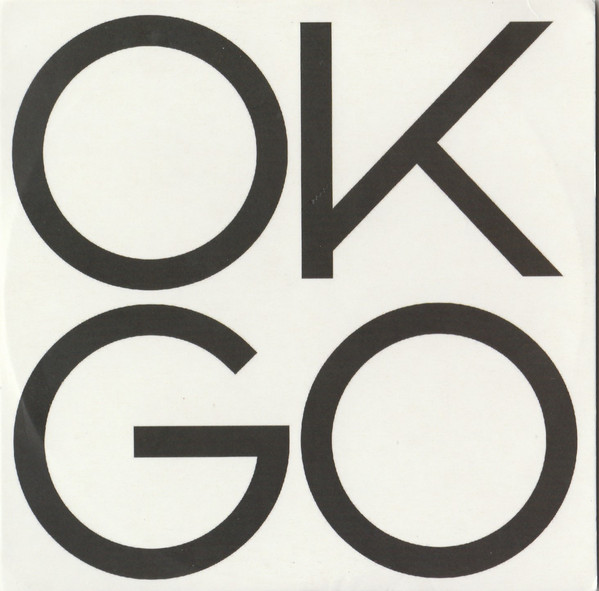

Single by OK Go

from the album Hungry Ghosts
- Released: December 8, 2014
- Studio: Tarbox Road (Cassadaga, New York)
- Genre: Disco
- Length: 3:43
- Label: Paracadute; BMG
- Songwriter: Damian Kulash
- Producer: Tony Hoffer

OK Go singles chronology
"The Writing's on the Wall" (2014)	"I Won't Let You Down" (2014)	"Upside Down & Inside Out" (2016)

"I Won't Let You Down" is a song by American rock band OK Go that was released as a single on December 8, 2014, and is part of their album Hungry Ghosts. The accompanying video, released on October 27, 2014, is a one-shot take recorded in double time showing the band members and several hundred dancers on personal transportation devices performing intricate choreographed routines while filmed by a camera on a multirotor aerial drone.

== Song ==
The song has a late '70s disco style. Band frontman Damian Kulash said that the disco influence came as they were toying around with the beat of the song and they hit upon a sound, evoking the style of the Jackson 5 and Diana Ross, at which point, "we knew we had something worth chasing". The song was featured in the 2014 American dance film Step Up: All In.

== Music video ==
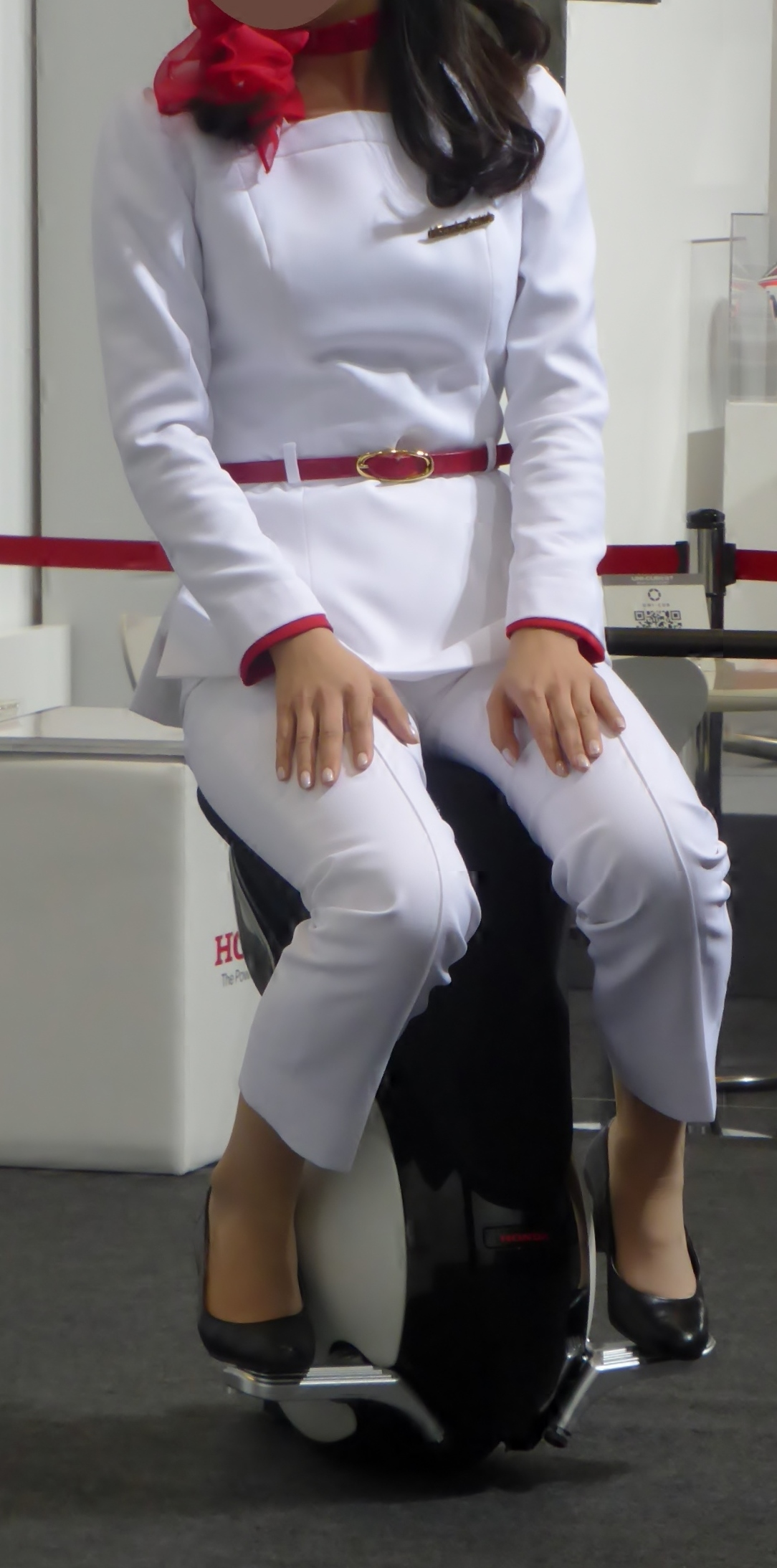
The video for "I Won't Let You Down" includes the use of multiple UNI-CUBs mobility devices included in the band's choreography.

The video for "I Won't Let You Down" premiered on The Today Show on October 27, 2014. Like several of the band's past videos, it consists of a single shot. The band members perform the video while riding Honda UNI-CUBs, personal mobility units that are controlled by the rider by shifting their weight. The group performs a routine within a warehouse before moving outside for larger choreographed routines with additional riders and dancers dressed in traditional Japanese school uniforms and carrying colored umbrellas. The video was filmed on a camera mounted to an octocopter drone, which allows for ground-level and bird's-eye-view shots during these routines, including a final high-altitude (700m) pan of the surrounding landscape. The Japanese electropop group Perfume make a cameo at the start of the video.

OK Go was inspired by a trip they had taken to Japan during which they visited Tokyo's Robot Restaurant, where numerous robots move about in motions set to heavy metal music; Tim Nordwind said that the experience was "the best hour of my life". They worked with producer Morihiro Harano, fulfilling a desire of several years. Harano linked them to Honda's internal ad agency, which led to them being put in contact with Japanese choreographer Airman to help plan out the routines. Honda went on to fund the film and provide the UNI-CUBs and the octocopter for the video. During an interview with The Today Show, Kulash said the video took about a month of concept, planning, and practicing before it was shot. The video was filmed around August 2014 at Longwood Station, a vacant outlet store in the Chiba Prefecture of Japan near Tokyo. Kulash and Kazuaki Seki co-directed the video. The video was filmed in double time, recording the events at half the speed of the song and then sped up for the final video. In the closing shots, which show the band and dancers from far overhead simulating a large dot matrix display with colored umbrellas, Harano had set large speakers at the corners of the area to play the song in half-time to help all the performers synchronize with the music. The camera drone was controlled both with GPS and manual control for fine adjustment by Harano and his crew. The final shot of the video includes over 2,300 participants; as there were not that many UNI-CUBs in existence at the time of filming, they used special framing to capture as many performers on the devices before pulling back in shot to include more dancers on foot without breaking the illusion. This final section took between 50 and 60 practice runs to get the timing correct. The filming took about four days to complete, in part because rain often prevented the outdoor use of the UNI-CUBs or the octocopter. The rain cleared up on the last planned day of filming, allowing them to complete the video. According to Harano, they recorded about 44 takes, including 11 completed takes, and three of the quality they sought.

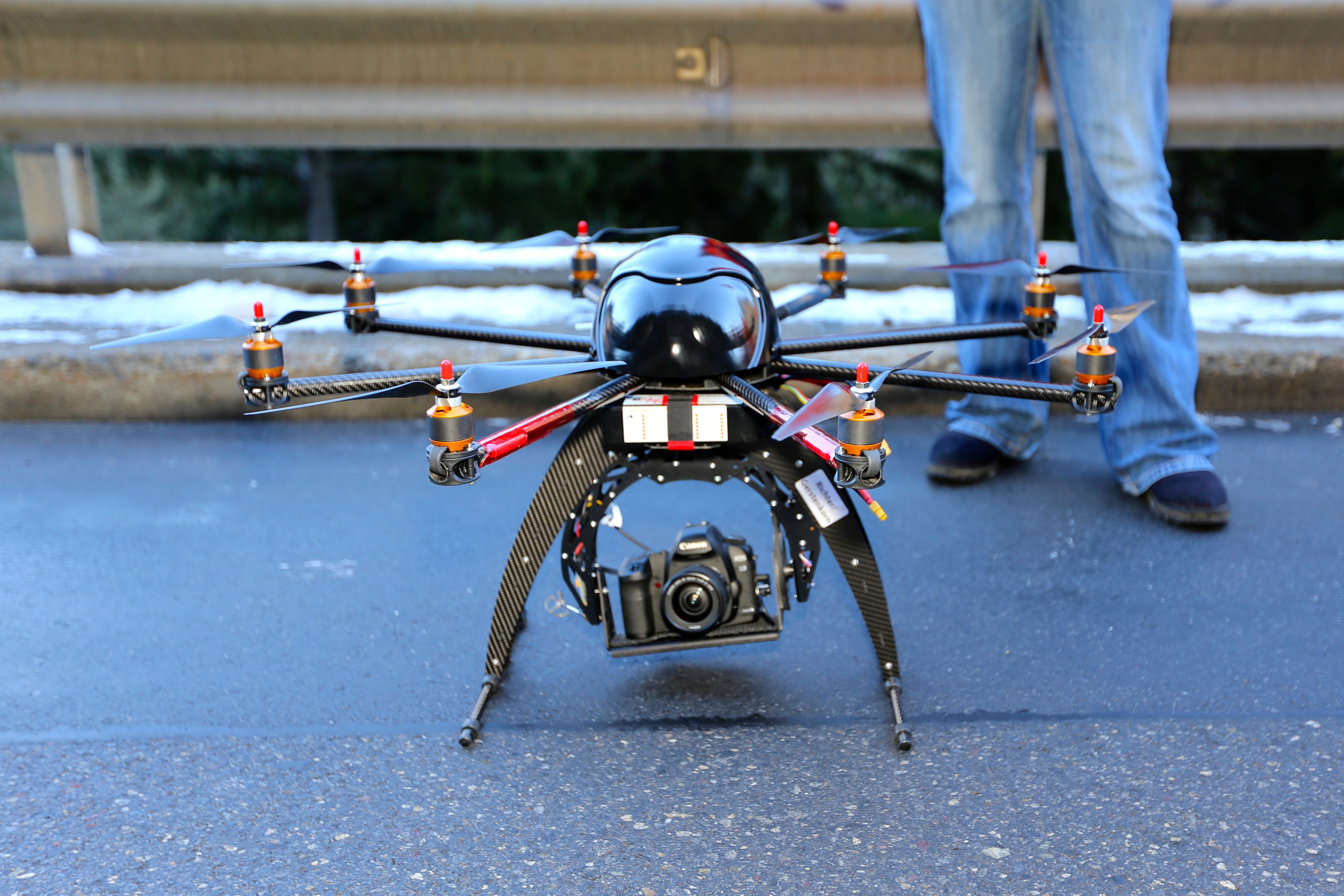
The band recorded the video using a camera mounted to a remote-controlled octocopter (similar to the one shown here).

The choreography in the video was inspired by the elaborate routines of musical director Busby Berkeley, and took the idea of using double time filming after observing that Berkeley had used sped-up footage to allow these routines to be captured properly on film. The opening sequence, primarily focusing on the OK Go band members, was made to feel like a futuristic version of Gene Kelly's dancing in Singin' in the Rain. Another inspiration was from mass games, popular in Japan and North Korea, which was used for next-to-final shot mimicking a dot-matrix display; they had used computer visualization to plan out the choreography, and plan to release an interactive version of the video that will allow users to create their own choreography based on this. The final shot, with the camera panning across the Japan landscape, was inspired by the Beatles' use of extended outros, as to give the viewer something "that packed a bit more entertainment even after the main part was over", according to Harano. The final ascent and pan shot lasts a full 70 seconds without audio accompaniment.

The video went viral, garnering 6 million worldwide YouTube views in two days and sending the song to No. 1 on the Billboard/Twitter Trending 140 chart.

The video won for Best Choreography at the 2015 MTV Video Music Awards.

In 2015, the band remixed “I Won’t Let You Down” as the soundtrack to a commercial for furniture company Red Star Macalline, a one-minute-47-second video alluded visually to their video for “The Writing’s on the Wall”.

== Charts ==
The song debuted at No. 71 on the Billboard Hot 100.

The song was later used in the Inside Out show Dream Productions, episode "The Dream Team" where Riley's dream was attending an upcoming school dance with Mermaid Unicorn.

Chart (2014)	Peak position
Japan Hot 100 (Billboard)	22
US Billboard Hot 100	71
US Hot Rock & Alternative Songs (Billboard)	7
