= The Writing's on the Wall (OK Go song) =

Single by OK Go

from the album Hungry Ghosts
- Released: June 17, 2014
- Studio: Tarbox Road (Cassadaga, New York)
- Genre: Alternative rock; pop rock
- Length: 3:35
- Label: Paracadute; BMG
- Songwriters: Damian Kulash; Tim Nordwind
- Producer: Dave Fridmann

OK Go singles chronology
"Skyscrapers" (2012)	"The Writing's on the Wall" (2014)	"I Won't Let You Down" (2014)

"The Writing's on the Wall" is a song by American rock band OK Go. It was released on June 17, 2014, as part of the band's EP Upside Out, and is also the first single from the band's fourth studio album Hungry Ghosts. On the same day, the band released a music video in which the members use props to create optical illusions, reflecting the song's description of a relationship that fails because the couple has different points of view. Like previous OK Go videos, it is structured as a one-shot music video. The many YouTube views of the video caused the song to debut in the top ten of the US Billboard Hot Rock Songs chart, as well as number one on the Bubbling Under Hot 100 Singles chart.

== Background and composition ==
"The Writing's on the Wall" is an alternative rock and pop rock song. OK Go frontman Damian Kulash said "The Writing's on the Wall" was written around "that moment in a relationship when you realize it’s coming to an end and that it’s inevitable", where there is the "feeling of having something coalesce and fall apart, like chaos and order". He said the song is written to be "melancholic and jubilant at the same time". The song lasts three minutes and thirty-five seconds. The arrangement of the mix consists of two heavily distorted bass guitars and drums, which producer Dave Fridmann described as "very standard". The band spent a lot of time working on the bass parts sounding distorted, which were re-tracked with a Music Man StingRay. Fridmann said "it was fun to track a live band because it was highly unusual for that session. We just knew that on this song, having them play together was the best way to tell whether our ideas were working."

== Music video ==
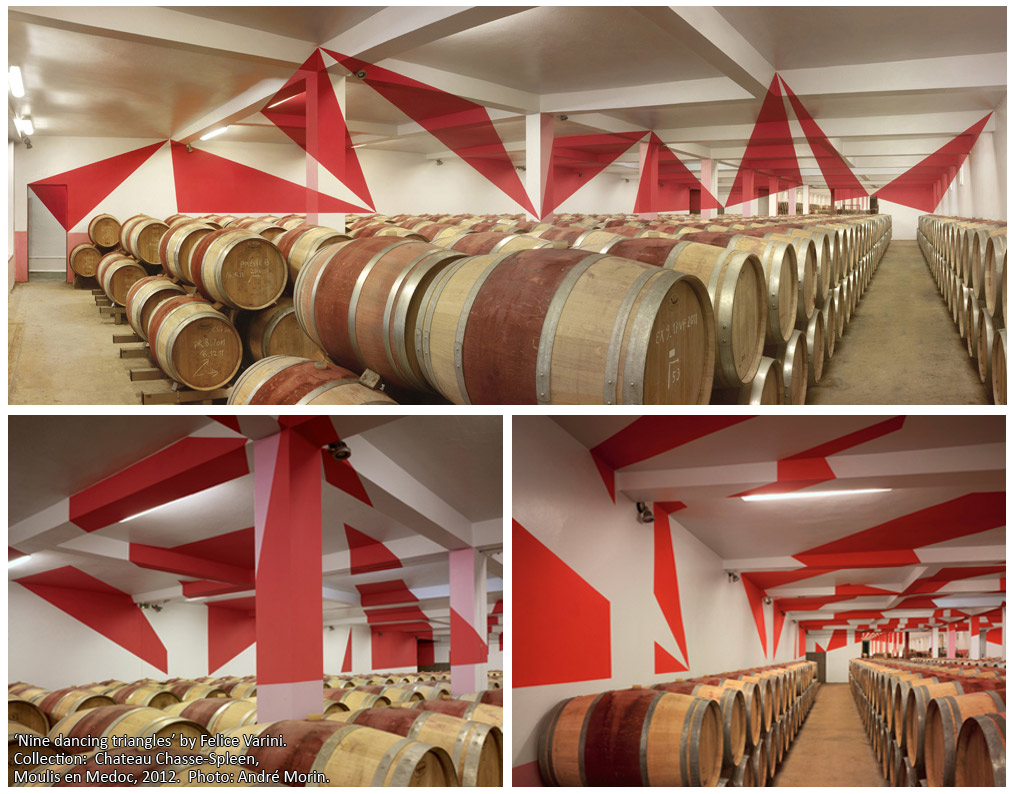
An example of the types of optical illusions used in OK GO's video, this specifically created by Felice Varini, in which the illusion of the floating triangles made up from painted surfaces, is achieved by viewing from a specific vantage point.

The four-minute video for "The Writing's on the Wall" is shot in a single take using a hand-held Panasonic Lumix DMC-GH4 camera mounted in a stabilizing Fig Rig frame, moved by members of OK Go and assistants through a warehouse with about 28 stations consisting of everyday objects mounted on supports, clothing worn by the band, and painted walls and floors of the warehouse. Each station creates optical illusions once the camera is set in position, such as trompe-l'œil by Felice Varini that work from a specific point, or illusions like the Necker cube that are based on a lack of depth perception. All the illusions were created by the camera shots, without post-processing special effects.

The video was co-directed by Kulash with Aaron Duffy and Bob Partington, creative personnel from the Special Guest and 1st Ave Machine agencies, respectively. The illusions were tied to the theme of the song, which Rolling Stone called "a pre-break-up report from a relationship in which two people keep seeing things in different ways". Kulash felt the use of illusions was a good representation of this concept. The band and crew used common household objects, not wanting to create any unintentional meanings behind their selection that they knew some viewers would search for. In the song's bridge, the camera is mounted on a rolling device as it passes wooden crates painted and populated with various objects, so that the words "I think / I understand you / but I don’t" appear when the camera rolls by. Kulash said this segment was "where the song comes out emotionally", and used the tighter confined space created by the crates to punctuate this segment from the larger warehouse space they had set the video in.

Planning took about two months and involved computer mock-ups to explore ideas. The warehouse set was built in Bedford–Stuyvesant, Brooklyn, where the band lived during the setup and filming of the video. It took about three weeks to assemble the set with the help of about 50 other people, including Kulash's father, who also helped to reset the course between filming takes. During testing, they found that some concepts required fine tuning, such as positioning an apparent pile of junk as to resemble band member Tim Nordwind's face at the right angle without losing the fact that the junk was still made from common household objects. Further, Nordwind had shaved off half his beard to achieve an effect involving a mirror worn on his face, allowing him to appear as two different people.

The concept of the one-shot was considered critical to the video as it immersed the viewer, making them more interested in the song. Nordwind considered this video to be the band's most difficult to film because of their involvement, including manning the camera and changing costumes nine times. The most complicated shots appear early in the sequence, so mistakes would be made at the front of the video to reduce the amount of time to reset the warehouse. They had anticipated that filming would take 2 or 3 days in early June 2014, but production difficulties left them with less than nine hours. They made about 60 attempts at the single take, working into the morning hours, and completed the full run 18 times. The final video is a take performed in the midpoint of the filming process.

The music video premiered at a special presentation at the Los Angeles Museum of Contemporary Art on June 16, 2014, with its world premiere the next day via Rolling Stone's website and OK Go's YouTube channel. Within a week of its premiere, the video had received over 7 million views on YouTube. The video won the award for Best Visual Effects at the 2014 MTV Video Music Awards.

== Release and reception ==
The band released "The Writing's on the Wall" alongside three other songs as the Upside Out EP on June 17, 2014, as a teaser for Hungry Ghosts. Reviews of the song were positive upon release. Roberts Randall, writing for The Los Angeles Times, said the song's melody has a New Order feel, while Chris Conaton of Popmatters called it "catchy, with a compelling vocal performance from Damien Kulash and a strong lyrical premise". "Writing's on the Wall" debuted at the top position of Billboard's US Bubbling Under Hot 100 Singles chart, an extension to the Billboard Hot 100, and in the top ten at number ten of the American Hot Rock Songs chart, marking OK Go's first entry on the chart. It was powered by 2.2 million US streams, with 92% of them coming from views of the music video. The song was featured in The Amazing Spider-Man 2.

== Impact ==
Apple Inc. used a similar video concept in their September 2014 keynote announcing the iPhone 6. The band has accused Apple of stealing its concept for the video, stating that they had previously gone to the computer company to obtain promotional funding for the band's video but the company turned them down. The band further contends that afterwards, Apple hired 1st Ave Machine and the same director they had used to make Apple's video. The band is exploring legal options to move forward.

OK Go was hired by the Chinese furniture company Red Star Macalline to create a video advertisement using similar single-take filming and optical illusion techniques as used in the video for "The Writing's on the Wall"; the music uses a mix of another song from the Hungry Ghosts album, "I Won't Let You Down".

== Chart positions ==
Chart (2014)	Peak position
Czech Republic Modern Rock (IFPI)	15
US Bubbling Under Hot 100 Singles (Billboard)	1
US Hot Rock Songs (Billboard)	10
