= 2014 MTV Video Music Awards =

Award ceremony

- Date: Sunday, August 24, 2014
- Location: The Forum (Inglewood, California)
- Country: United States

Highlights
- Most awards: Beyoncé (4)
- Most nominations: Beyoncé and Iggy Azalea (8 each)
- Website: www.mtv.com/vma/2014/

Television/radio coverage
- Network: MTV; MTV2; VH1; Logo TV
- Produced by: Amy Doyle; Garrett English; Jesse Ignjatovic; Dave Sirulnick
- Directed by: Hamish Hamilton

The 2014 MTV Video Music Awards were held on August 24, 2014, at The Forum in Inglewood, California. It was the 31st annual MTV Video Music Awards. Beyoncé and Iggy Azalea led the nominees with eight nominations each, while Eminem followed them with seven. Beyoncé received the Michael Jackson Video Vanguard Award, following a 16-minute medley of her self-titled fifth studio album. The show had an audience of 8.3 million viewers, while 10.1 million cumulative with the other three Viacom networks that simulcast the presentation.

== Performances ==
Artist(s)	Song(s)
Pre-show
Fifth Harmony	"Boss"
Charli XCX	"Boom Clap"
Main show
Ariana Grande; Nicki Minaj; Jessie J	"Break Free" (Grande) "Anaconda" (Minaj) "Bang Bang"
Taylor Swift	"Shake It Off"
Sam Smith	"Stay with Me"
Usher; Nicki Minaj	"She Came to Give It to You"
5 Seconds of Summer	"Amnesia"
Iggy Azalea; Rita Ora	"Black Widow"
Maroon 5	"Maps" "One More Night" (outdoor stage)
Beyoncé	Michael Jackson Video Vanguard Award Medley "Mine" "Haunted" (contains excerpts from "Ghost" and "Pretty Hurts") "No Angel" "Jealous" / "Blow" / "Drunk in Love" "Rocket" "Partition" "Flawless" (contains elements from "Superpower" and "Flawless (Remix)") "Yoncé" "Blue" (contains excerpts from "Heaven") "XO"

House artist

- DJ Mustard

== Presenters ==
=== Pre-show ===
- Lucy Hale and Sway – hosts
- Lucy Hale – presented Best Lyric Video
- Christina Garibaldi – red carpet
- Ingrid Nilsen and Becky G – fashion correspondents

=== Main show ===
- Gwen Stefani and Snoop Dogg – presented Best Female Video
- Jay Pharoah – performed a short stand-up routine and spoke about Artist to Watch voting procedures
- Lorde – introduced Taylor Swift
- Chelsea Handler – presented Best Male Video
- Jay Pharoah as Jay-Z – again performed a short stand-up routine and spoke about Artist to Watch voting procedures
- Jim Carrey and Jeff Daniels – presented Best Pop Video
- Kim Kardashian West – introduced Sam Smith
- Common – spoke about the situation in Ferguson, Missouri, and presented Best Hip-Hop Video
- Jay Pharoah as Kanye West – again performed a short stand-up routine and spoke about Artist to Watch voting procedures
- Uzo Aduba, Laverne Cox and Taylor Schilling – introduced Usher and Nicki Minaj
- Nina Dobrev and Trey Songz – presented Best Rock Video
- Chloë Grace Moretz and Dylan O'Brien – introduced 5 Seconds of Summer
- Jay Pharoah – presented Artist to Watch
- Jennifer Lopez – introduced Iggy Azalea and Rita Ora
- Demi Lovato and Jason Derulo – introduced Maroon 5
- Jimmy Fallon – presented Video of the Year
- Jay-Z and Blue Ivy Carter – presented Video Vanguard Award

== Winners and nominees ==
The nominations were announced on July 17, 2014. Winners are in bold text.

Video of the Year	Best Male Video
**Miley Cyrus – "Wrecking Ball"**; Iggy Azalea (featuring Charli XCX) – "Fancy"; Beyoncé (featuring Jay-Z) – "Drunk in Love"; Sia – "Chandelier"; Pharrell Williams – "Happy"	**Ed Sheeran (featuring Pharrell Williams) – "Sing"**; Eminem (featuring Rihanna) – "The Monster"; John Legend – "All of Me"; Sam Smith – "Stay with Me"; Pharrell Williams – "Happy"
Best Female Video	Artist to Watch
**Katy Perry (featuring Juicy J) – "Dark Horse"**; Iggy Azalea (featuring Charli XCX) – "Fancy"; Beyoncé – "Partition"; Ariana Grande (featuring Iggy Azalea) – "Problem"; Lorde – "Royals"	**Fifth Harmony – "Miss Movin' On"**; 5 Seconds of Summer – "She Looks So Perfect"; Charli XCX – "Boom Clap"; Schoolboy Q – "Man of the Year"; Sam Smith – "Stay with Me"
Best Pop Video	Best Rock Video
**Ariana Grande (featuring Iggy Azalea) – "Problem"**; Avicii (featuring Aloe Blacc) – "Wake Me Up"; Iggy Azalea (featuring Charli XCX) – "Fancy"; Jason Derulo (featuring 2 Chainz) – "Talk Dirty"; Pharrell Williams – "Happy"	**Lorde – "Royals"**; Arctic Monkeys – "Do I Wanna Know?"; The Black Keys – "Fever"; Imagine Dragons – "Demons"; Linkin Park – "Until It's Gone"
Best Hip-Hop Video	MTV Clubland Award
**Drake (featuring Majid Jordan) – "Hold On, We're Going Home"**; Childish Gambino – "3005"; Eminem – "Berzerk"; Kanye West – "Black Skinhead"; Wiz Khalifa – "We Dem Boyz"	**Zedd (featuring Hayley Williams) – "Stay the Night"**; Disclosure – "Grab Her!"; DJ Snake and Lil Jon – "Turn Down for What"; Martin Garrix – "Animals"; Calvin Harris – "Summer"
Best Collaboration	Best Direction
**Beyoncé (featuring Jay-Z) – "Drunk in Love"**; Chris Brown (featuring Lil Wayne and Tyga) – "Loyal"; Eminem (featuring Rihanna) – "The Monster"; Ariana Grande (featuring Iggy Azalea) – "Problem"; Katy Perry (featuring Juicy J) – "Dark Horse"; Pitbull (featuring Kesha) – "Timber"	**DJ Snake and Lil Jon – "Turn Down for What" (Directors: DANIELS)**; Beyoncé – "Pretty Hurts" (Director: Melina Matsoukas); Miley Cyrus – "Wrecking Ball" (Director: Terry Richardson); Eminem (featuring Rihanna) – "The Monster" (Director: Rich Lee); OK Go – "The Writing's on the Wall" (Directors: Damian Kulash, Aaron Duffy & Bob Partington)
Best Choreography	Best Visual Effects
**Sia – "Chandelier" (Choreographer: Ryan Heffington)**; Beyoncé – "Partition" (Choreographers: Svetlana Kostantinova, Philippe Decouflé, Danielle Polanco and Frank Gatson); Jason Derulo (featuring 2 Chainz) – "Talk Dirty" (Choreographer: Amy Allen); Michael Jackson and Justin Timberlake – "Love Never Felt So Good" (Choreographers: Rich and Tone Talauega); Kiesza – "Hideaway" (Choreographer: Ljuba Castot); Usher – "Good Kisser" (Choreographers: Jamaica Craft and Todd Sams)	**OK Go – "The Writing's on the Wall" (Visual Effects: 1stAveMachine)**; Disclosure – "Grab Her!" (Visual Effects: Mathematic and Emile Sornin); DJ Snake and Lil Jon – "Turn Down for What" (Visual Effects: DANIELS and Zak Stoltz); Eminem – "Rap God" (Visual Effects: Rich Lee, Louis Baker, Mammal Studios, Laundry! and Sunset Edit); Jack White – "Lazaretto" (Visual Effects: Mathematic and Jonas & François)
Best Art Direction	Best Editing
**Arcade Fire – "Reflektor" (Art Director: Anastasia Masaro)**; Iggy Azalea (featuring Charli XCX) – "Fancy" (Art Director: David Courtemarche); DJ Snake and Lil Jon – "Turn Down for What" (Art Director: Jason Kisvarday); Eminem – "Rap God" (Art Director: Alex Pacion); Tyler, The Creator – "Tamale" (Art Director: Tom Lisowski)	**Eminem – "Rap God" (Editor: Ken Mowe)**; Beyoncé – "Pretty Hurts" (Editor: Jeff Selis); Fitz and the Tantrums – "The Walker" (Editor: James Fitzpatrick); MGMT – "Your Life Is a Lie" (Editor: Erik Laroi); Zedd (featuring Hayley Williams) – "Stay the Night" (Editor: Daniel "Cloud" Campos)
Best Cinematography	Best Video with a Social Message
**Beyoncé – "Pretty Hurts" (Directors of Photography: Darren Lew and Jackson Hunt)**; Arcade Fire – "Afterlife" (Director of Photography: Evan Prosofsky); Lana Del Rey – "West Coast" (Director of Photography: Evan Prosofsky); Gesaffelstein – "Hate or Glory" (Director of Photography: Michael Ragen); Thirty Seconds to Mars – "City of Angels" (Director of Photography: David Devlin)	**Beyoncé – "Pretty Hurts"**; Avicii – "Hey Brother"; J. Cole (featuring TLC) – "Crooked Smile"; David Guetta (featuring Mikky Ekko) – "One Voice"; Angel Haze (featuring Sia) – "Battle Cry"; Kelly Rowland – "Dirty Laundry"
Best Lyric Video
**5 Seconds of Summer – "Don't Stop"**; Ariana Grande (featuring Iggy Azalea) – "Problem"; Demi Lovato (featuring Cher Lloyd) – "Really Don't Care"; Austin Mahone (featuring Pitbull) – "Mmm Yeah"; Katy Perry – "Birthday"
Michael Jackson Video Vanguard Award
**Beyoncé**

== Artists with multiple wins and nominations ==
Artists who received multiple awards
Wins	Artist
4	Beyoncé

Artists who received multiple nominations
Nominations	Artist
8	Beyoncé
8	Iggy Azalea
7	Eminem
5	Charli XCX
4	DJ Snake
4	Ariana Grande
4	Lil Jon
4	Pharrell Williams
3	Katy Perry
3	Rihanna
3	Sia
2	2 Chainz
2	5 Seconds of Summer
2	Arcade Fire
2	Avicii
2	Disclosure
2	Hayley Williams
2	Jason Derulo
2	Jay-Z
2	Juicy J
2	Lorde
2	Miley Cyrus
2	OK Go
2	Pitbull
2	Sam Smith
2	Zedd

== Music Videos with multiple wins and nominations ==
Music Videos that received multiple awards
Wins	Artist	Music Video
2	Beyoncé	"Pretty Hurts"

Music Videos that received multiple nominations
Nominations	Artist	Music Video
4	Ariana Grande (featuring Iggy Azalea)	"Problem"
4	Beyoncé	"Pretty Hurts"
4	DJ Snake and Lil Jon	"Turn Down for What"
4	Iggy Azalea (featuring Charli XCX)	"Fancy"
3	Eminem	"Rap God"
3	Eminem (featuring Rihanna)	"The Monster"
3	Pharrell Williams	"Happy"
2	Beyoncé (featuring Jay-Z)	"Drunk in Love"
2	Beyoncé	"Partition"
2	Disclosure	"Grab Her!"
2	Jason Derulo (featuring 2 Chainz)	"Talk Dirty"
2	Katy Perry (featuring Juicy J)	"Dark Horse"
2	Lorde	"Royals"
2	Miley Cyrus	"Wrecking Ball"
2	OK Go	"The Writing's on the Wall"
2	Sam Smith	"Stay with Me"
2	Sia	"Chandelier"
2	Zedd (featuring Hayley Williams)	"Stay the Night"

== See also ==
- 2014 MTV Europe Music Awards
