= Beauvoir School =

Coordinates: 38.9299°N 77.0680°W

Location
- 3500 Woodley Road, NW; Washington, D.C. 20016; USA

Information
- Type: Private, Day
- Religious affiliation: Episcopal
- Established: 1933
- Headmaster: Cindi Gibbs-Wilborn
- Grades: Pre-K - 3rd
- Gender: Coeducational
- Enrollment: 396
- Student to teacher ratio: 6:1
- Campus: Urban
- Accreditation: AIMS, Middle States Association of Colleges and Schools
- Website: www.beauvoirschool.org

The Beauvoir School is a coeducational primary school on the grounds of the Washington National Cathedral in Washington D.C., serving students from pre-kindergarten through 3rd grade. In 1933, it was founded to prepare boys for St. Albans School and girls for National Cathedral School, which serve grades 4–12.

Like the Cathedral itself and the affiliated schools, Beauvoir is overseen by the Protestant Episcopal Cathedral Foundation.

== History ==
In 1933, Beauvoir was established as a "separate and independent school in the Cathedral system" by the Cathedral Chapter. The principal Elizabeth Glascock Taylor, and the faculty were motivated to "make children's education more exciting so that their students would be inspired to learn."

Beauvoir was initially a segregated, all-white school, but accepted its first black student in 1952.

In 2008, school employees discovered that a teacher, Eric Justin Toth, had created child pornography involving students. After five years on the FBI's Most Wanted List, he was apprehended after fleeing to Nicaragua and sentenced to 25 years in prison.

In 2012, a new playground was completed. It was designed to appeal to children under 10 of varying ages and abilities, and featured in The Wall Street Journal.

== Student body ==
During the 2017–18 school year, Beauvor's K-3 student body was 60.2% white, 21.3% multiracial, 11.8% black, 4.3% Asian, and 2.1% Hispanic.

Beauvoir graduates have priority access to St. Albans and National Cathedral School. In 2018, Beauvoir reported that their students had a 90% acceptance rate at those two highly rated, selective schools.

== Curriculum ==
Beauvoir has always been focused on helping develop all aspects of the student. While K-3 curriculum still centers on the core elementary subjects, it also branches into social, emotional, and international subject areas.

All core subjects are taught by homeroom teachers except for foreign language (Spanish). Subjects taught by homeroom teachers include reading and writing, math, and social studies. Foreign language (Spanish), art, music, science, and physical education are each administered by at least one teacher who teaches across K-3.

All home rooms have at least two full-time teachers. This allows each homeroom teacher to specialize their areas of focus. Due to Beauvoir's close teacher-student ratio, teachers are oftentimes able to work in small groups of 3-4 students to encourage critical-thinking and work towards a more 1-on-1 approach. Social and emotional learning is also taught in homerooms. These classes are meant to help students deal with social issues during and beyond their Beauvoir education.

=== Kindergarten ===
The kindergarten grade is divided into two classes of roughly 15 students each. Kindergarten curriculum is focused on building foundational skills for learning the core subjects, such as developing reading and basic addition and subtraction skills. Kindergarten students also learn basic Spanish and how to tell time on an analog clock.

=== First Grade ===
Beauvoir's first grade curriculum is focused on expanding on the core-subject matter learned in Kindergarten. Students transition into slightly more advanced maths and learn how to follow the daily schedule and complete homework. One of the largest emphasis in first grade is one community engagement and participation in-class. First graders are all required to undergo WISC standardized testing mid-year. This is the first of two standardized tests offered at Beauvoir from K-3.

=== Second Grade ===
Second grade's strongest emphasis is on reading, as developing a broader vocabulary base as well as reading more elementary-level texts. Second graders continue to engage in community activities within Beauvoir and outside the school on various field-trips. Second graders also begin to develop their music education with various singing and tone-stick activities.

=== Third Grade ===
At this point, the third grade is divided into 4 classes of 15 due to increases in enrollment as grades progress. Third grade is most notably designed to prepare students to continue their studies at St. Albans or The National Cathedral School. Both schools are noticeably more academically rigorous. Because of this, third graders develop more complex skills in arithmetic, reading and writing, and study more in-depth international social studies topics. In music, third graders are expected to perform a rendition of "Old MacDonald Had a Farm" on the recorder, and spend a long time in music class learning to play the recorder. In science, students dissect small squid to discuss biology in a visual-oriented manner. Finally, one of the vital parts of Beauvoir's third grade curriculum is its preparation of students for their future studies. Third grade notably assigns increased homework from a multitude of subjects to reinforce the cumulative learning from the student's K-3 education. Third graders also take the second WISC test of their education at Beauvoir.

== Notable alumni ==
- Michael Bennet
- André Heinz
- Edward Moore Kennedy, Jr.
- Kara Kennedy
- Patrick J. Kennedy
- Susan Rice
- Damian Kulash, lead singer of OK Go
