= Hungry Ghosts (album) =

Studio album by OK Go
- Released: October 14, 2014
- Recorded: September 17, 2012 – May 31, 2013
- Studio: Tarbox Road (Cassadaga, New York)
- Genre: Electronic rock; indie pop; power pop; pop rock
- Length: 41:57
- Label: Paracadute; BMG
- Producer: Dave Fridmann; Tony Hoffer

OK Go chronology
Twelve Days of OK Go (2012)	Hungry Ghosts (2014)	And the Adjacent Possible (2025)

Singles from Hungry Ghosts
- 1. "The Writing's on the Wall" Released: June 17, 2014; 2. "I Won't Let You Down" Released: December 8, 2014; 3. "Upside Down & Inside Out" Released: February 11, 2016; 4. "The One Moment" Released: November 23, 2016; 5. "Obsession" Released: November 23, 2017

Hungry Ghosts is the fourth studio album by American rock band OK Go. It was released on October 14, 2014, under the band's own Paracadute record label and was produced by Dave Fridmann and Tony Hoffer. The band's first studio album since 2010's Of the Blue Colour of the Sky, it is a concept album whose lyrics are mostly about the pros and cons of a relationship. The album has a more electronic and modern approach than their previous studio albums. The album was recorded over three years at Dave Fridmann's Tarbox Road Studios in Cassadaga, New York. The album received generally favorable reviews from music critics and charted at number 74 in the Billboard 200.

The band has released five official singles from the album with accompanying music videos: "The Writing's on the Wall", "I Won't Let You Down", "Upside Down & Inside Out", "The One Moment", and "Obsession". The music video for "The Writing's on the Wall" was nominated in two categories at the 2014 MTV Video Music Awards, winning Best Visual Effects, but losing to "Turn Down for What" by DJ Snake and Lil Jon for Best Direction. The music video for "I Won't Let You Down" was nominated for, and later won, Best Choreography at the 2015 MTV Video Music Awards.

== Production ==
With the exception of the single "I Won't Let You Down," which was produced by Tony Hoffer in Los Angeles, most of the album was produced by Dave Fridmann at his New York studio Tarbox Road. Production began with the listening sessions, where band members sent in about 40 demos. They also discussed how they would produce differently from their previous records and how they would change their sound. The group had spent two years writing material with no set sound in mind. According to Fridmann, they decided to use a combination of Pro Tools and Reason, so "everything was elastic. Everything was synced up to a Reason track, so we could edit in both worlds, and we set up the studio with five different stations. We had the main A and B studios with my stuff, and three alternate rooms so all five of us had our own workspace." He described the development of the songs in an interview with Mix Online:

"We'd just go from room to room. You'd work on whatever song you wanted for a while, and then you'd get tired or run out of ideas, and then you'd go listen to somebody else's room for a while and make comments on what they were doing. Somebody else would be listening to your stuff and they'd give comments back. We just kept walking around the building in a circle, commenting on each other's work and improving each other's work."

The vocals were mainly recorded using Neumann U 7 and Sennheiser MD 421 mics, with a Neve 8801 occasionally being used if necessary. Several guitar amps were used, including a Selmer and 1950s Fender Princeton amp. The guitars were tracked with a Bock 251 mic. On the drums, an Electro-Voice 868 mic was used for the kick, a Neumann 105 for the snare, and DPA 4006s for the overheads. An E-V RE27 was used to track bass guitar. Fridmann said that "a lot of the interesting sounds on this album originated inside of Reason. We did a lot of programming, and that made it easy to transfer files; no matter what you did in a Thor synthesizer, you could take it to somebody else's Reason station and it sounds the same. Then we could speed it up, slow it down, do whatever we want." Frontman Damian Kulash also used an OP-1 synthesizer manufactured by Teenage Engineering in recording the album.

== Composition ==
Hungry Ghosts features elements of electronic rock, power pop and disco. OK Go frontman Damian Kulash called Hungry Ghosts "pretty stylistically diverse," like their previous three studio albums, yet more electronic, "but not in an EDM kind of way." He said some parts of the album are "very modern", with some tracks "made almost entirely of glitchy electronic sounds", while others are influenced by 1980s acts including Prince, INXS and New Order. Lyrically, the album is mainly about the pros and cons of relationships.

== Release ==
The album's October 14 release date was announced May 6, 2014. A sampler four-track EP titled Upside Out was released for free on June 17, 2014. The album was available for pre-order on the direct-to-fan platform, PledgeMusic.

== Singles ==
"The Writing's on the Wall" was chosen as the album's lead single. The song received positive reviews. Its official accompanying music video premiered at the Los Angeles Museum of Contemporary Art on June 16, 2014, and made its world premiere the next day via Rolling Stone's website and OK Go's YouTube channel. The video drew over 7 million views on YouTube, which caused the song to debut at the top position of Billboard's US Bubbling Under Hot 100 Singles chart and in the top ten at number ten of the American Hot Rock Songs chart, marking OK Go's first entry on the chart.

"I Won't Let You Down" was chosen as the second single from the album. The song's accompanying music video was released on October 27, 2014 through YouTube and was later released as an official single on December 8, 2014. The song debuted in the Billboard Hot 100 at No. 71, making it the band's first Hot 100-charting single since "Here It Goes Again", when it charted at No. 38 in 2005. The song fell out of the chart a week after it debuted. The song also charted in the Billboard Hot Rock Songs chart at No. 7.

The last single from the album was "Obsession". The music video for this single was released on YouTube on November 23, 2017. To produce the video, the band collaborated with the paper company Double A, and used 567 printers to create the video's backdrop.

== Reception ==
Professional ratings
Aggregate scores
Source	Rating
Metacritic	74/100
Review scores
Source	Rating
AllMusic	4/5 stars
Alternative Press	4/5 stars
Gaffa	4/6 stars
Paste	7.8/10
PopMatters	6/10 discs
Rolling Stone	3.5/5 stars
Under the Radar	5/10 stars

Hungry Ghosts earned positive reviews from critics. As of October 2014, the record holds an aggregated 74 of out 100 on Metacritic based on 6 critics, indicating "generally favorable reviews".

AllMusic's Gregory Heaney gave it four stars out of five, writing that with this album, "OK Go continue to impress." A writer for the Alternative Press awarded it a similar rating, describing the material as "far more immediate" than their previous studio effort. Scoring it a 7.8 out of ten, Hilary Saunders of Paste opined it "may not be the musical evolution that fans sought after four years, but OK Go's bold pursuits of creativity in all media remain exciting still." Chris Conaton, reviewing for PopMatters, felt the band took "two steps forward" with the album, but also went "one step back", concluding that "having three or four outright clunkers on your album seems like too many." He gave it a six out of ten.

== Track listing ==
All songs are credited to OK Go; actual writer credits taken from ASCAP.

No.	Title	Writer(s)	Length
1.	"Upside Down & Inside Out"	Damian Kulash	3:08
2.	"The Writing's on the Wall"	Kulash; Tim Nordwind	3:33
3.	"Another Set of Issues"	Kulash	3:58
4.	"Turn Up the Radio"	Kulash; Nordwind; Andy Ross; Dan Konopka	2:56
5.	"Obsession"	Kulash; Nordwind	3:08
6.	"I'm Not Through"	Kulash	3:36
7.	"Bright as Your Eyes"	Kulash	2:55
8.	"I Won't Let You Down"	Kulash	3:43
9.	"The One Moment"	Kulash; Nordwind; Ross; Konopka	3:43
10.	"If I Had a Mountain"	Kulash; Ross	3:19
11.	"The Great Fire"	Kulash	4:17
12.	"Lullaby"	Kulash	3:42
Total length:			41:57

Japanese bonus track
No.	Title	Writer(s)	Length
13.	"Fight Song"	Kulash; Konopka	3:07
Total length:			45:18

== Personnel ==
OK Go

- Damian Kulash, Jr. – lead vocals, guitars, synthesizers, keyboards, programming, percussion
- Andy Ross – keyboards, synthesizers, guitars, backing vocals
- Tim Nordwind – bass guitar, synthesizers, backing vocals
- Dan Konopka – drums, programming, percussion

Production

- Dave Fridmann – producer (tracks 1–7, 9–13), mixer (tracks 3, 6, 10–13)
- Tony Hoffer – producer (track 8), mixer (track 8)
- Jeremy Wheatley – mixer (tracks 1, 2, 4, 5, and 7)
- Adam Looker – mixing assistant (tracks 1, 2, 4, 5, and 7)
- Charlie Russell – mixer (track 9)
- Bradley Spence – mixer (track 9)
- Cameron Lister – recording, engineering (track 8)
- Ryan Smith – mastering (tracks: 1, 3, 5–7, 10–13)
- Greg Calbi – mastering (tracks 2, 4, 8, 9)

== Charts ==
Chart (2014)	Peak position
Japanese Albums (Oricon)	245
US Billboard 200	74
US Independent Albums (Billboard)	13
US Top Rock Albums (Billboard)	19

== Uses in media ==
"Turn up the Radio" was used in Season 4, Episode 11 ("eXit"), of Mr. Robot.
