= Felice Varini =

Swiss visual artist

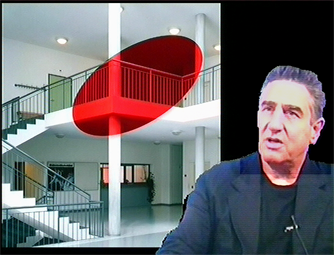
- Varini in 1995
- Born: 6 March 1952; Locarno, Ticino, Switzerland
- Known for: Perspective-localized painting
- Notable work: 5 Open Ellipses (2009); Disc (2011); Nine dancing triangles (2012); Concentric, eccentric (2018)

Felice Varini Gallery

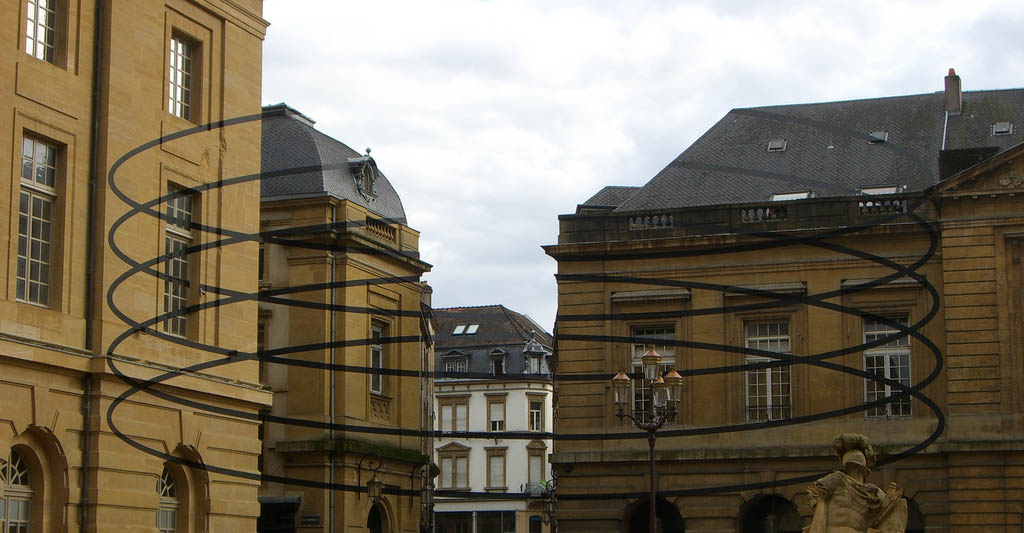
5 Open Ellipses. Urban painting of Felice Varini, in Metz, 2009

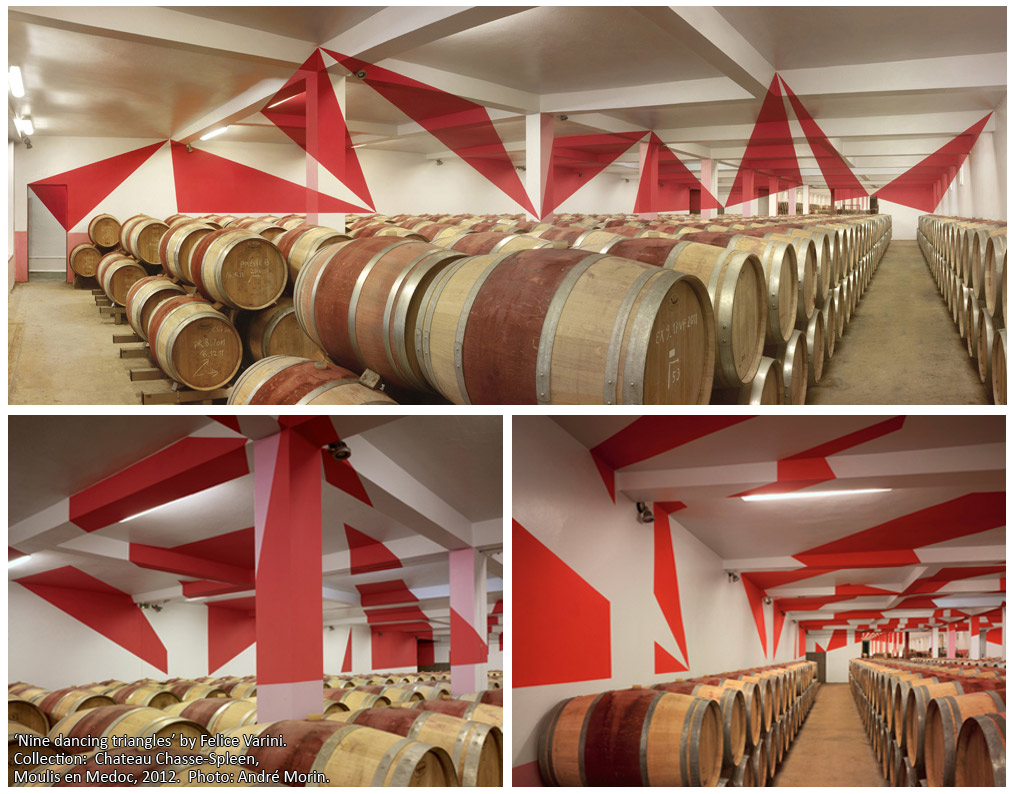
Nine dancing triangles - by Felice Varini, France, 2012

Felice Varini (born in Locarno in 1952) is a Paris-based, Swiss artist who was nominated for the 2000/2001 Marcel Duchamp Prize. Mostly known for his geometric perspective-localized paintings in rooms and other spaces, using projector-stencil techniques, according to mathematics professor and art critic Joël Koskas, "A work of Varini is an anti-Mona Lisa."

== Style ==
Felice paints on architectural and urban spaces, such as buildings, walls and streets. The paintings are characterized by one vantage point from which the viewer can see the complete painting (usually a simple geometric shape such as circle, square, line), while from other viewpoints the viewer will see 'broken' fragmented shapes. Varini argues that the work exists as a whole - with its complete shape as well as the fragments. "My concern," he says "is what happens outside the vantage point of view."

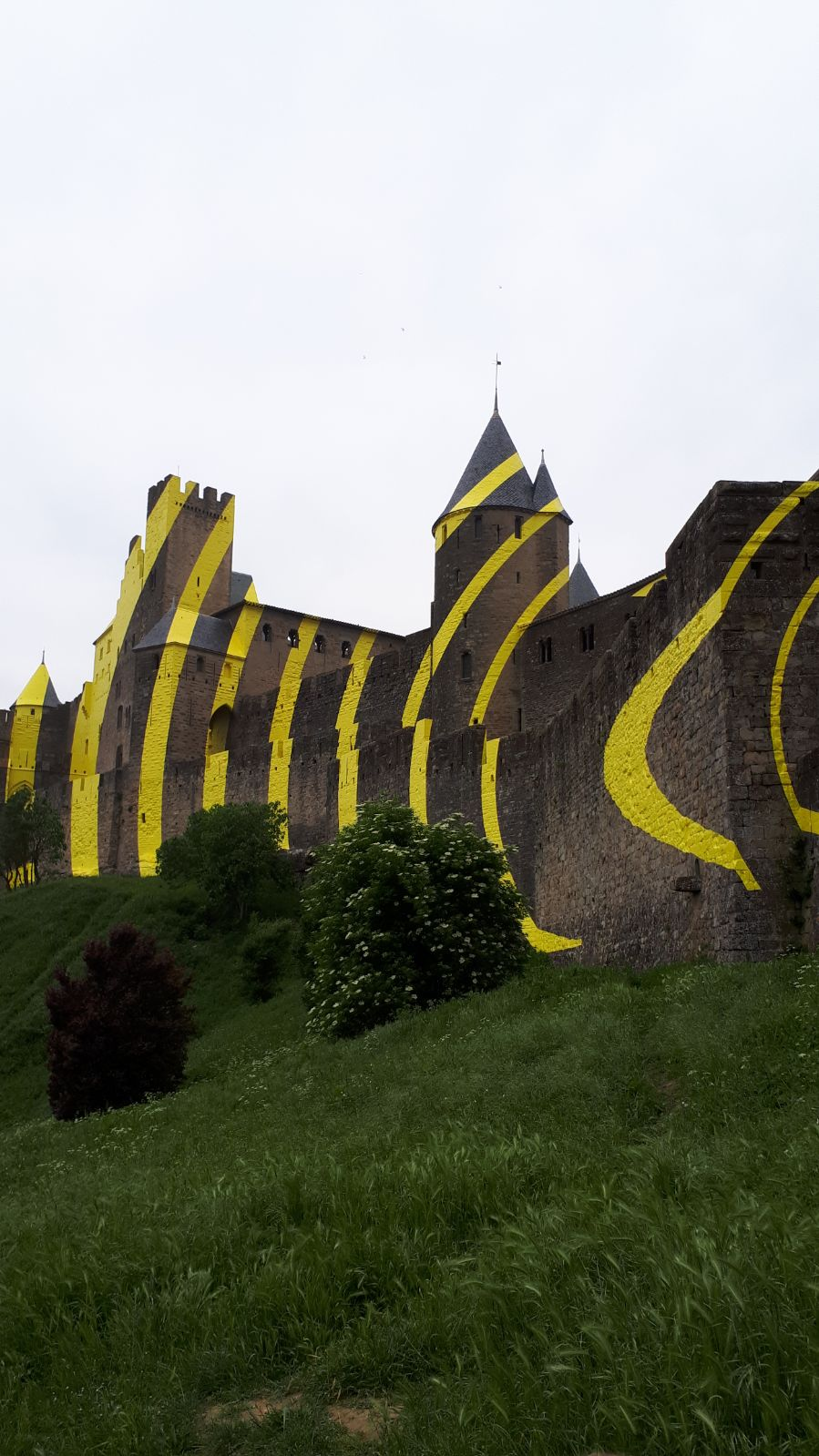
Felice Varini, project "Concentric, eccentric" with concentric yellow circles, at Carcassonne for the 7th "IN SITU, Heritage and contemporary art" event in May 2018 to celebrate the 20th anniversary of the inscription on the World Heritage List of UNESCO

== Carcassonne 2018 ==
In May 2018, Varini's project "Concentric, eccentric" saw large yellow concentric circles mounted on the monument at Carcassonne as part of the 7th edition of "IN SITU, Heritage and contemporary art", a summer event in the Occitanie / Pyrenees-Mediterranean region focusing on the relationship between modern art and architectural heritage. This monumental work was to celebrate the 20th anniversary of Carcassonne's inscription on the World Heritage List of UNESCO. Exceptional in its size, visibility and use of architectural space, the exhibit extended on the western front of the fortifications of the city. The work could only be fully perceived in front of the Porte d'Aude at the pedestrian route from the Bastide. The circles of yellow colour consist of thin, painted aluminium sheets, spread like waves of time and space, fragmenting and recomposing the geometry of the circles on the towers and curtain walls of the fortifications. The work should have remained visible from May to September 2018 only, but it left traces still present in 2021.

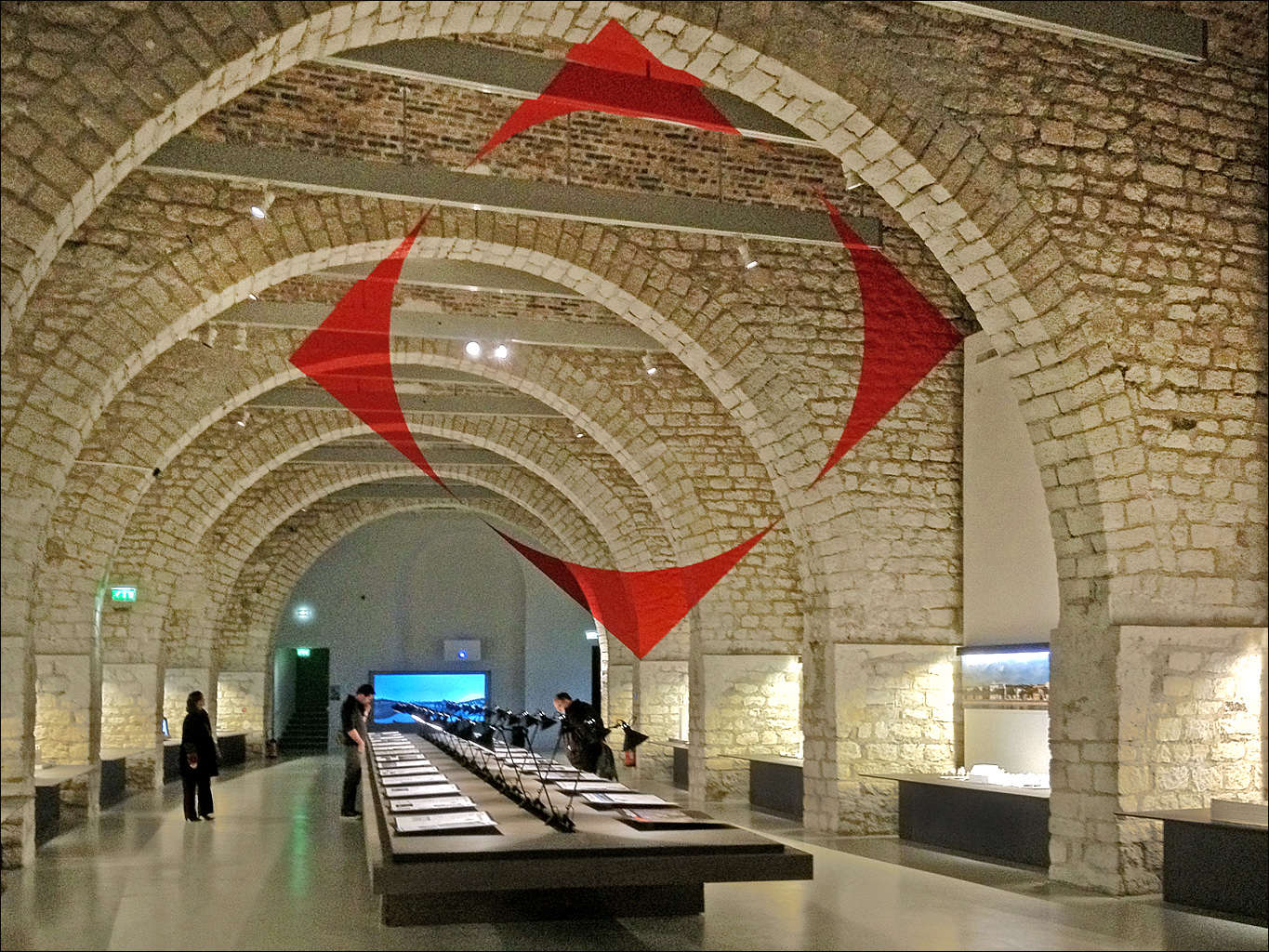
Felice Varini's "Disc" 2011

== Disc 2011 ==
The Lyon Confluence project was a major urban development carried out in France. The exhibition in 2011, presented the complete architectural vision, using the help of photographs, models, drawings, 3D digital images, and films, for the City of Architecture and Heritage. The museographic space of the Lyon Confluence exhibition was a Renaissance laboratory. On the ceiling, Red square hollowed out by Felice Varini's "Disc", 2011.
