= Upside Down & Inside Out =

Single by OK Go

from the album Hungry Ghosts
- Released: February 11, 2016
- Studio: Tarbox Road (Cassadaga, New York)
- Genre: Power pop; noise pop; synth-pop
- Length: 3:09
- Label: Paracadute
- Songwriters: Damian Kulash; Tim Nordwind
- Producer: Dave Fridmann

OK Go singles chronology
| "I Won't Let You Down" (2014) | "Upside Down & Inside Out" (2016) | "The One Moment" (2016) |

"Upside Down & Inside Out" is a song by American rock band OK Go. It was released as a single from their fourth studio album, Hungry Ghosts.

The band released a video for the song on February 11, 2016 that featured the members in a zero gravity environment created via flight in a reduced gravity aircraft. They produced the video with support from the Russian S7 Airlines.

== Music video ==
=== Production ===
The music video for "Upside Down & Inside Out" shows the band moving about in zero gravity created by the parabolic flight path of a reduced gravity aircraft. They perform various stunts impossible at normal gravity and use of props such as laptop computers and tablets, dozens of balls, and paint-filled balloons. The video also features two trained aerialist acrobats dressed as air hostesses from S7 Airlines, Tatyana Martynova and Anastasia Burdina, who perform aerial acrobatics, including a demonstration of the conservation of angular momentum.

Band member Damian Kulash had the idea of doing a zero-gravity video for some time, and was excited when commercial space travel efforts were started around 2007 with SpaceX and Virgin Galactic. He and his co-director sister Trish Sie, rode on the NASA "Vomit Comet" in November 2012; they considered shooting a music video aboard one, but found the limitations too limiting. In 2015, a Russian ad agency, TutkovBudkov, proposed a partnership between Russian S7 Airlines and OK Go to shoot a video aboard one of the airline's planes. The agency organized a meeting between Kulash and S7 Airlines' representatives at the Cannes Lions International Festival of Creativity, where the airline pledge funding and aircraft. Additional funding for the video production came from Good Morning America, Facebook, and Instagram.

"Upside Down & Inside Out" was written before the video was proposed. The song's lyrics are about "discombobulation", according to Kulash, and included the line "gravity's just a habit that you're pretty sure you can't break", making it a perfect fit for the video.

Once they had secured S7 and made necessary arrangements over several months, the band traveled to Moscow to develop the video, spending three weeks of training and filming at the Roscosmos State Corporation center. The first week was used to train and get used to the flight patterns while experimenting with various motions and props they could use. During the second week, they used flights to plan the choreography. Filming of the various takes took place in the third week.

A representative parabolic flight profile used to create zero gravity for the video

They wanted to maintain the appearance of a single take, and to make sure they did not just use zero gravity for random antics, but for something choreographed. They also had to figure out how to handle the three-minute song; each parabolic flight in the Ilyushin Il-76 aircraft typically provides around 27 seconds of zero gravity. They found they could break the song into segments that they timed with the periods of weightlessness, slowing down the song about 30% for recording to match the flight timing better and help set up more complex shots. Between periods of weightlessness, they adopted still positions, which they used to trim out the periods of non-weightlessness and morphing the transition between these cuts, though still within the same take. The resulting video includes eight periods of zero gravity, taken over the course of 45 minutes of flight time. To get a single take they were satisfied with, a total of 21 flights were made with the aid of about 30 people including the camera crew and the plane's pilots. The shooting took a toll on the band and crew; Kulash passed out during one of the shoots.

=== Release and reception ===
The video was released to the band's Facebook page on February 11, 2016; by the following day it had gone viral, with over 24 million views. Though previous videos have been posted through their YouTube channel, Kulash stated that they felt using Facebook was a way to experiment with distribution of their music to their fans. Adweek writers Christopher Heine and David Griner noted that the band had previous difficulties with YouTube; their 2010 video for "This Too Shall Pass" was restricted from being embedded on other video sites due to record label concerns, and in 2012, the band stated revenues from their videos on YouTube was marginal. A version of the video had been uploaded to YouTube by S7 Airlines, but had to be taken down within a day of posting due to the video's exclusive release on Facebook. OK Go and S7 uploaded the music video on their YouTube channels two days later on February 13.

== Usage in media ==
The song was featured in The Simpsons episode "Fears of a Clown".
