= Protestant Episcopal Cathedral Foundation =

Organization of Washington National Cathedral

The Protestant Episcopal Cathedral Foundation was chartered by Congress on January 6, 1893. This Episcopal Church organization oversees Washington National Cathedral (formally known as the Cathedral Church of Saint Peter and Saint Paul) and its sister institutions.

The bishop of the Episcopal Diocese of Washington serves as the Foundation's chair and president, while the dean of Washington National Cathedral serves as the vice chair of the Foundation's board of trustees.

The Foundation comprises four institutions: Washington National Cathedral (established 1893), the National Cathedral School for girls (established 1900); St. Albans School for boys (established 1909), and Beauvoir, The National Cathedral Elementary School (established 1933). All of the schools are located on the 57-acre grounds of the Cathedral.

In 2004, the Foundation's Cathedral College was formed by a merger of the College of Preachers (founded in 1924), and the Cathedral Program & Ministry department. The College of Preachers was formerly housed at a stone Gothic Revival building adjacent to the cathedral. The building closed after the 2008 recession, but was later restored and in 2008 renamed the Virginia Mae Center in honor of Virginia Mae Cretella Mars (d. 2024), a major benefactor to the center who was formerly married to Forrest Mars Jr., a Mars family heir. It operates as a continuing education center for Episcopal clergy.

The cathedral's annual operating budget was approximately $16 million in 2004 and $25 million in 2022. The cathedral had 86 full-time employees in 2022.

In 2011, after three decades of on-and-off negotiations, the Foundation purchased three apartment complexes across from the cathedral grounds (at 3010, 3022-28 and 3100 Wisconsin Avenue NW) for $16.25 million. After the 2011 Virginia earthquake, the Foundation raised money for the costly repairs required to fix damage.
