= The One Moment =

Single by OK Go

from the album Hungry Ghosts
- Released: November 23, 2016
- Recorded: 2013/2014
- Studio: Tarbox Road (Cassadaga, New York)
- Genre: Pop rock
- Length: 3:43
- Label: Paracadute
- Songwriter(s): Damian Kulash; Tim Nordwind
- Producer(s): Dave Fridmann

OK Go singles chronology
"Upside Down & Inside Out" (2016)	"The One Moment" (2016)	"Obsession" (2017)

"The One Moment" is a song by American rock band OK Go. It was released as the fourth single from their fourth studio album, Hungry Ghosts (2014). The band released a video associated with the song, its production sponsored by Morton Salt to highlight their "Walk Her Walk" campaign. The one-shot video primarily consists of 4.2 seconds of real-time footage recording over 300 distinct events set in motion by the band members and timed devices, slowed down to be played over the length of the song.

== Overview ==
"The One Moment" was released as part of OK Go's 2014 album, Hungry Ghosts. At the time of writing the lyrics, Damian Kulash considered the chorus to be an uplifting declaration. On release of the video in November 2016, the cultural and political landscape has shifted, and Kulash said that the song now "feels strangely like a premonition" on the recent events.

== Music video ==
The music video for "The One Moment" features the members of OK Go interacting with various props on an initially stark-white set. Many of the props are inflated balloons filled with colored liquid that splash across the set pieces and the band members as they are ruptured in time to the music. The bulk of the video is shown in slow motion, at times slowed at 20,000% from real-time speed to match the beat of the song.

Morton Salt provided financial support for the video. The company had wanted to change its brand image to demonstrate that its salt was more than just a commodity but is used across a range of industries that affects everyday life. They reused their mascot, the Morton Salt Girl, as part of this new branding campaign, "Walk Her Walk", to show about making a positive impact. Morton's CEO Christian Herrmann stated that "We want to embody her spirit to make a real, tangible difference in people's lives." The company approached the band about creating a video to help with this new campaign, as they felt the band would help "to bring new meaning to the brand and create relevance, especially with millennials", according to Morton's director of communications and corporate brand strategy Denise Lauer. The two groups agreed that "The One Moment" seemed to fit best, as the song was about the importance of every moment. The video includes images of five "difference makers" that Morton felt would help inspire viewers to make a positive impact on the world. The video concludes with the image of the Morton Salt Girl as well.

The video was directed by Kulash. The band wanted the video of "The One Moment" to keep "the sense of emotion and earnestness" that they associated with the song. Kulash had a great interest in using slow-motion for a video, and the rest of the band felt this would be a good fit. Kulash believed their song was "meant to make you think about those few moments in life that really matter", and slow-motion would capture that "sense of majesty" they associated with the song.

Preparation and filming of the video took about seven weeks. Much of the work was on timing elements; they had to break down events down to a two-millisecond resolution, which Kulash compared more to developing the math of the video to feed into computers rather than the choreography. To capture the action at the speed they wanted, they needed to use a robotic setup with multiple arms, each with a high-speed camera attached to it. Kulash stated that one robotic arm would not have been fast enough to follow the action on the set and that they considered they were "pushing the limits of what the robots could do". Kulash had spent about two months prior to the filming on testing ways to use existing robotic technology to successfully complete the video. While the final video does stitch the multiple shots from the cameras to appear as a single take, the final shots were all taken from the same instance of time. According to Kulash, a total of 325 events occur during the 4.2 seconds of real-time footage that was taken.

=== Release ===
The music video was released on November 23, 2016. The video went viral, and Morton launched a paid search advertising campaign to send the video's viewers to its campaign site. By November 25, 2016, the Facebook video had 6.4 million views. Within the first five days of its release, the video received over 4.6 million views on YouTube.

== Charts ==
Chart (2016)	Peak position
US Hot Rock & Alternative Songs (Billboard)	9
