= Shana Lutker =

American artist

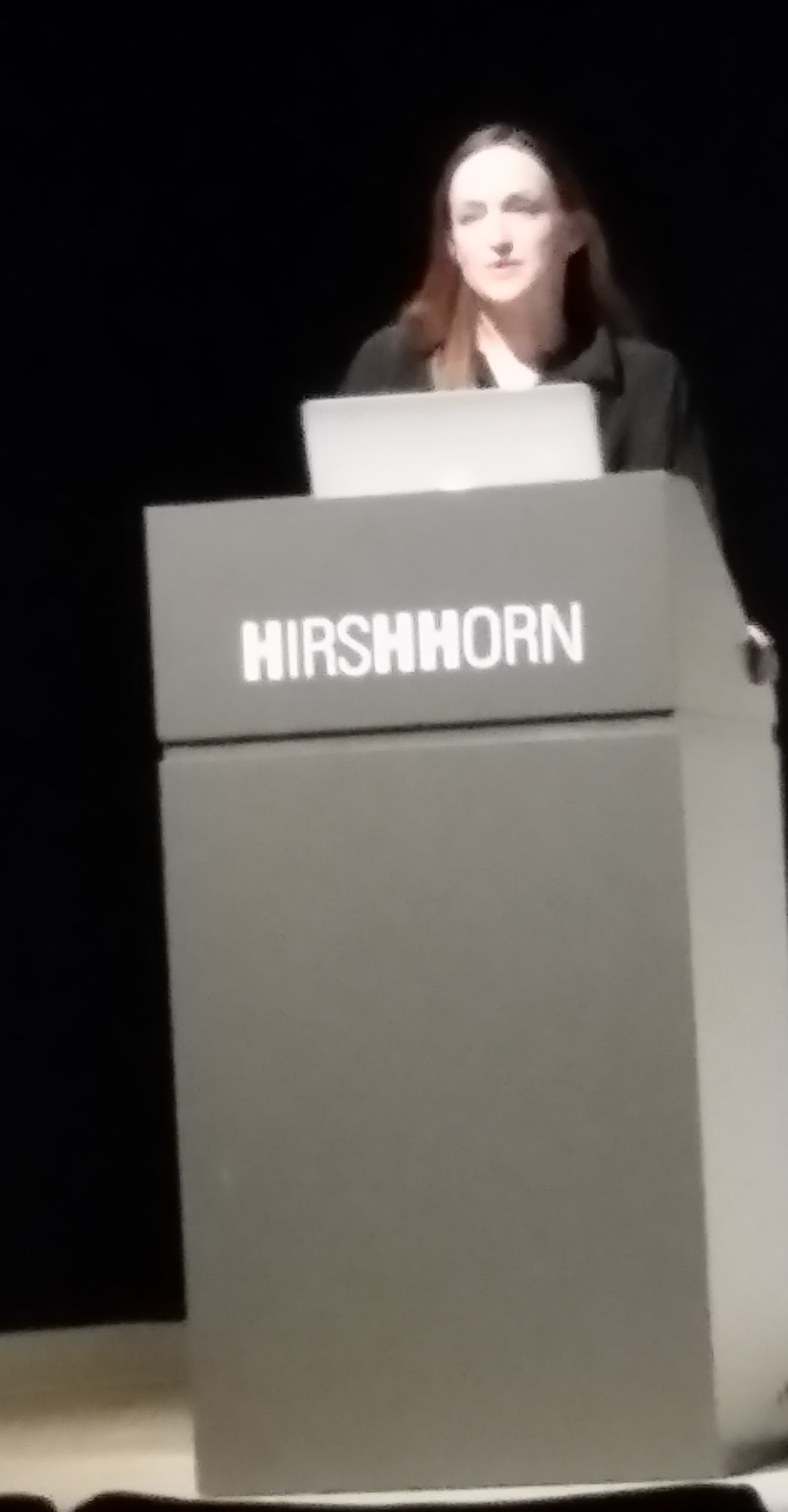
- Shana Lutker speaking at the Hirshhorn, January 2016
- Born: 1978 (age 47–48)
- Website: www.shanalutker.com/

Shana Lutker is an artist currently working and living in Los Angeles, CA. Lutker works in sculpture, installation, performance, and text. Her concepts are often synthesized from historical and theoretical research. Lutker is represented in Los Angeles by Susanne Vielmetter Los Angeles Projects. In addition to solo exhibitions at Vielmetter, LAXART, and Barbara Seiler Galerie, she was included in Performa 13 and the 2014 Whitney Biennial. Lutker has also exhibited at the Perez Art Museum Miami.

Lutker is also an editor of X-TRA and the Executive Director of Project X.

She was previously married to singer and musician Damian Kulash, of rock band OK Go.
