= White Knuckles =

Single by OK Go

from the album Of the Blue Colour of the Sky
- Released: October 12, 2010
- Recorded: 2009
- Genre: Alternative rock; synth-pop; funk
- Length: 3:19
- Label: Paracadute Recordings
- Songwriter: Damian Kulash
- Producer: Dave Fridmann

OK Go singles chronology
"End Love" (2010)	"White Knuckles" (2010)	"All Is Not Lost" (2011)

"White Knuckles" is a song by alternative rock band OK Go from the album Of the Blue Colour of the Sky. The song traces its roots to Prince's style of funk and R&B that brought him to fame.

It was featured in the film The Cabin in the Woods.

== Rock Band remix ==
Fans of the song were given the opportunity to create a remix of "White Knuckles" for inclusion in the Rock Band music video game series through the Rock Band Network. This was won by The Big Robot.

== Music video ==
The music video for "White Knuckles" was co-directed by lead singer Damian Kulash and his sister Trish Sie. The pair had previously directed the band's famous treadmill video for "Here It Goes Again." The one-shot video features the band members performing choreographed actions with minimal props (mostly IKEA furniture) alongside a number of trained dogs and one goat, with the actions set in time to the song. Sie thought that in considering the success of the treadmill video, "wouldn’t it be kind of cool if this time the guys were the machines and they’re enabling and operating the dogs". The idea for the "White Knuckles" video followed shortly after the completion of the treadmill video, just prior to the 2006 Video Music Awards. The band considered the idea "absurd and awesome", and a routine was developed in 2009 using only three live animals, with stuffed animals as stand-ins. During the recording of Of the Blue Colour of the Sky, Kulash and Sie played the album alongside their own dogs and watched how the dogs reacted to the songs, finding that "White Knuckles" "matched the playfulness of [their] dogs". Much like with the video for "Here It Goes Again", bassist Tim Nordwind does the lip-syncing in this video instead of Kulash.

The crew of the "White Knuckles" video: the band OK Go, their co-stars, and their trainers

Fourteen dogs and the goat were provided and trained by Talented Animals, with head trainer Lauren Henry; all of the dogs were from animal rescue shelters. Part of the requirement of the band was that the shot had to be performed in a single take, a feat that Roland Sonnenburg, a spokesperson for Talented Animals, said was "not bloody likely" to happen. Each dog was paired with the trainer they worked best with to prevent one dog from taking the wrong direction.

The development of the routine, training of the dogs, and the shooting were filmed in a disused plastics factory in Corvallis, Oregon. The dogs were trained for two weeks prior to the band's direct involvement, tweaking and tuning the choreography to work with the animals they had. The band and Sie joined in about one week prior to the shooting period to acclimate themselves to the dogs. The trainers sought to create a relaxing atmosphere for the animals, realizing that they would not be easy to handle under normal human situations, and tried to ensure that the dogs would be enjoying the tricks they had to perform. The dogs were able to learn the routine's tricks; the most difficult trick, according to Tim Nordwind, was convincing two dogs to step in and out of a set of shelves while the band members provided platforms for the dogs to use and while spinning the shelves around. They initially trained the dogs to perform their tricks at half-speed, and slowly increased the pace to match the song's beat; however, as they neared the end of the filming period, the dogs were enjoying the performance so much that they began to outpace the song. The goat, appearing only briefly in the video, was originally going to be pulled across the set on a treadmill to reference the "Here It Goes Again" video, but after the band used this reference in the "This Too Shall Pass" video, they decided against repeating it. Instead, they used a feed bag to lure the goat, which would often drag the band's Andy Ross across the set.

A total of 124 takes were made during the filming period; about 30 were complete takes, with 10 of those being considered "excellent" by the group. The released version was Take 72, completed on the second-to-last day of shooting. They had considered splicing together other takes where certain actions were more "magical" than in Take 72, but the group did not want to cheat the one-shot requirement, and instead used what they had considered the best overall shot.

The video premiered on The Ellen DeGeneres Show on September 20, 2010, and was posted shortly afterward by the band to YouTube. The video quickly became a viral video as OK Go's previous videos, reaching a million views on YouTube within 24 hours of its posting. With the release of the video, OK Go encouraged its viewers to assist in animal rescue efforts through their web site, and will provide a portion of sales of the video to the ASPCA.

The video had been shot in both 2D and 3D, though only had been released using the 2D version as there were few opportunities to show off the 3D version, according to Sie. As part of an initial system update, the Nintendo 3DS portable video game system includes the 3D version of "White Knuckles".

== Track listings ==
=== CD single ===
No.	Title	Length
1.	"White Knuckles" (Radio Edit)	3:02
2.	"White Knuckles" (Album Version)	3:19

=== Digital Maxi Single ===
No.	Title	Length
1.	"White Knuckles"	3:18
2.	"White Knuckles" (Boys Like Us Mix)	2:58
3.	"White Knuckles" (Static Revenger Club Mix)	4:45
4.	"White Knuckles" (Sam Sparro Remix)	5:56
5.	"White Knuckles" (Static Revenger Instrumental Dub)	4:02
6.	"White Knuckles" (Neil Voss Remix)	3:18
7.	"White Knuckles" (Music Video)	3:26

=== Digital Remix EP ===
No.	Title	Length
1.	"White Knuckles" (Boys Like Us Mix)	2:58
2.	"White Knuckles" (Static Revenger Club Mix)	4:45
3.	"White Knuckles" (Sam Sparro Remix)	5:56
4.	"White Knuckles" (Static Revenger Instrumental Dub)	4:02
5.	"White Knuckles" (Neil Voss Remix)	3:18

=== 10" Single ===
Side A
No.	Title	Length
1.	"White Knuckles" (Neil Voss Remix)	3:18
2.	"All Is Not Lost" (Serious Business Remix)	4:56

Side B
No.	Title	Length
1.	"This Too Shall Pass" (Passion Pit Remix)	4:26
2.	"White Knuckles" (Boys Like Us Mix)	2:58
