= All Is Not Lost (song) =

Single by OK Go

from the album Of the Blue Colour of the Sky
- B-side: "All Is Not Lost (Live)"; "All Is Not Lost (Serious Business Remix)"; "All Is Not Lost (Keys 'n' Crates Remix)"
- Released: August 9, 2011
- Recorded: 2009
- Genre: Indie pop; alternative rock
- Length: 2:43
- Label: Paracadute Recordings
- Songwriter(s): Damian Kulash; Tim Nordwind
- Producer(s): Dave Fridmann

OK Go singles chronology
"White Knuckles" (2010)	"All Is Not Lost" (2011)	"Needing/Getting" (2012)

"All Is Not Lost" is an alternative rock song performed by the band OK Go from their 2010 album Of the Blue Colour of the Sky. A music video released on August 9, 2011, features the band dancing the song with the dance company Pilobolus. It was released as a Google Chrome Experiment, made in association with Google, specially for HTML5 and Google Chrome. This currently displays an error message. The video was nominated for a 2012 Grammy Award in the category of Best Short Form Music Video.

== Music video ==
In the music video, the performing members of Pilobolus 7 and Ok Go are in sea-foam green jumpsuits. The entire video was performed on top of a steel and plexiglass platform with a projector capturing the images from below. Pilobolus 7 performs a stage version of this that shows one of the frames with the performers all interacting with and around it.

The music video was commissioned by Google Chrome as a Chrome Experiment for HTML5.

Production for the video began shortly after the Tsunami in Japan. The Google Chrome team from Japan contacted OK Go to begin the project. The band described the song as "a love letter to Japan."
