= And the Adjacent Possible =

2025 studio album by OK Go

And The Adjacent Possible

Studio album by OK Go
- Released: April 11, 2025
- Studio: Blamn (Los Angeles); Bandrika (Los Angeles); Sound City (Los Angeles)
- Length: 45:46
- Label: Paracadute
- Producer: Dave Fridmann; OK Go

OK Go chronology
Hungry Ghosts (2014)	And The Adjacent Possible (2025)

Singles from And The Adjacent Possible
- 1. "A Stone Only Rolls Downhill" Released: January 16, 2025; 2. "A Good, Good Day at Last" / "Going Home" Released: February 14, 2025; 3. "This Is How It Ends" / "Take Me with You" Released: March 14, 2025; 4. "Love" Released: April 11, 2025; 5. "Once More with Feeling" Released: May 13, 2025; 6. "Fantasy vs. Fantasy" Released: July 14, 2025

And the Adjacent Possible is the fifth studio album by American rock band OK Go, released on April 11, 2025. It is the band's first studio album since Hungry Ghosts (2014).

In late 2024, OK Go announced through their newsletter that they had finished recording their then-untitled fifth album, planned for release in early 2025. The album was announced along with the release of the first video and single from the album, "A Stone Only Rolls Downhill", on January 16, 2025. The video consists of 64 separate continuous videos displayed across 64 mobile phone screens using mosaic effects.

They would release two double singles on February 14 and March 14. The album was released on April 11, 2025, along with a new video, "Love". The one-shot video creates several kaleidoscope-like visual effects using mirrors manipulated by both the band members and Universal Robots robotic arms, shot in a historic Budapest train station. It took 39 takes to coordinate 60 people, 26 robotic arms, and 60 mirrors to get the single-shot take.

== Track listing ==
No.	Title	Writer(s)	Length
1.	"Impulse Purchase"	Damian Kulash, Jr.; Timothy Nordwind	2:39
2.	"A Stone Only Rolls Downhill"	Kulash	3:20
3.	"Love"	Kulash; Nordwind	3:50
4.	"A Good, Good Day at Last" (featuring Ben Harper, Shalyah Fearing, and Beginners)	Kulash; Nordwind	2:59
5.	"Fantasy vs. Fantasy"	Kulash; Nordwind; Andrew Ross	4:05
6.	"This Is How It Ends"	Kulash	4:05
7.	"Take Me with You"	Kulash; Nordwind	4:17
8.	"Better Than This"	Kulash; Nordwind	4:03
9.	"Golden Devils"	Kulash; Craig Wedren	4:51
10.	"Once More with Feeling"	Kulash; Nordwind	3:14
11.	"Going Home"	Kulash; Nordwind; Ross	3:29
12.	"Don't Give Up Now"	Kulash; Nordwind; Ross	4:48
Total length:			45:46

== Personnel ==
Credits adapted from the album's liner notes.

=== OK Go ===
- Damian Kulash, Jr. – performance, production, engineering, design
- Timothy Nordwind – performance, production, engineering
- Andy Ross – performance, production, engineering
- Dan Konopka – performance, production, engineering

=== Additional contributors ===
- Dave Fridmann – production, mixing, Dolby Atmos mixing
- Nathan Barr – additional production (tracks 1, 5, 6)
- Joey Waronker – additional production, additional percussion (2, 5)
- Harry Risoleo – engineering
- Michael Fridmann – additional mixing
- Jon Fridmann – Dolby Atmos engineering
- Brian Lucey – mastering
- Matt Chamberlain – additional percussion
- Mark Herman – Fender Rhodes (1, 9)
- Eytan Oren – backing vocals (4, 11)
- Ben Harper – backing vocals (4)
- Sam Barbera – backing vocals (4)
- Shalyah Fearing – backing vocals (4)
- Bill Holloman – horns (6, 8)
- Curt Ramm – horns (8)
- Brian L. Perkins – handclaps (10)
- Yuri Suzuki – design
- Claudio Ripol – design
- LovePop – interior popup sphere engineering
