= Paracadute =

American record label

- Founded: 2010
- Founder: OK Go
- Status: active
- Distributors: Universal Music Group (physical); BMG Rights Management (digital)
- Genre: Rock, alternative rock, experimental
- Country of origin: United States of America
- Official website: okgo.net

Paracadute is an independent record company owned by rock band OK Go. OK Go left their previous record company, EMI, because of a disagreement between the band and the label. OK Go reissued their album, Of the Blue Colour of the Sky, with Paracadute taking care of the promotion and distribution of the album reissues. OK Go's lead singer, Damian Kulash, announced the new label in a video posted to the band's YouTube channel.

In addition to OK Go's music, Paracadute has released projects by Lavender Diamond, Pyyramids, and a smart phone app called "Say The Same Thing."

Infinity Shred, an electronic chiptune band, joined Paracadute with their new album release Sanctuary.

== Artists who signed with Paracadute ==
- OK Go (founder)
- Pyyramids
- Lavender Diamond
- Infinity Shred

== Projects released with Paracadute ==
- OK Go – And the Adjacent Possible
- OK Go – Hungry Ghosts
- OK Go – Of the Blue Colour of the Sky
- OK Go – Of the Blue Colour of the Sky (Extra Nice Edition)
- OK Go – 180/365
- OK Go – Twelve Remixes of Four Songs
- OK Go – Twelve Days of OK Go
- OK Go – Twelve Months of OK Go
- Lavender Diamond – Incorruptible Heart
- Pyyramids – Human Beings
- Pyyramids – Brightest Darkest Day
- Say the Same Thing (app)
- Infinity Shred – Sanctuary
