= Damian Kulash =

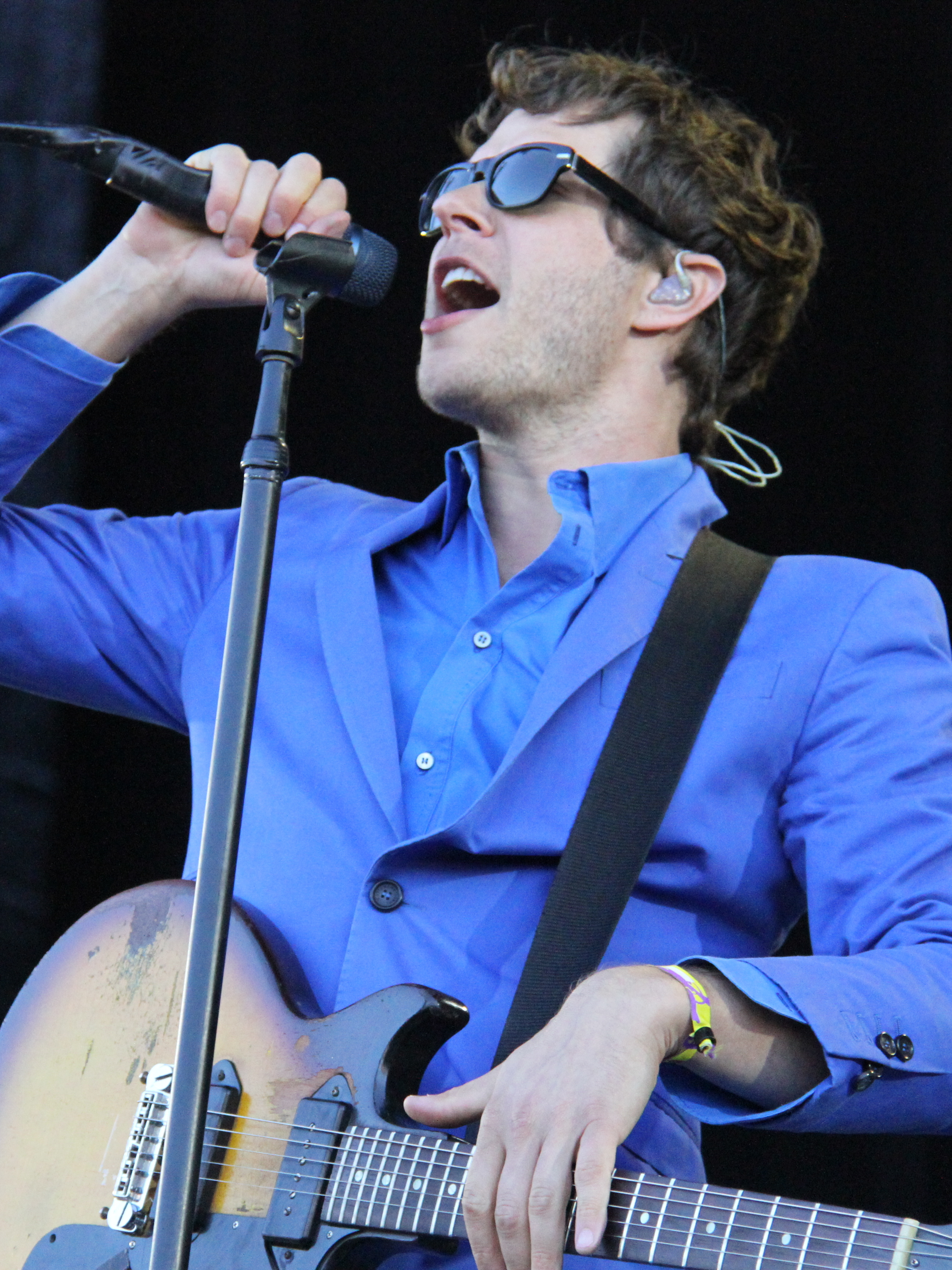
- Kulash performing in 2011

Background information
- Born: Damian Joseph Kulash, Jr. October 7, 1975 (age 51)
- Origin: Washington, D.C., U.S.
- Genres: Alternative rock; indie rock; power pop; pop rock
- Occupations: Musician; singer; songwriter; music video director
- Instruments: Vocals; guitar; keyboards; programming
- Years active: 1998–present
- Label: Paracadute
- Spouse: Shana Lutker (divorced) Ambra Medda (divorced) Kristin Gore (m. 2016)

Damian Joseph Kulash Jr. (born October 7, 1975) is an American musician. He is the lead singer, guitarist, primary lyricist, and founder of the rock band OK Go.

== Early life and education ==
Kulash was born in Washington D.C. on October 7, 1975 to Damian Joseph Kulash (originally "Kulas"), Sr. (born March 18, 1944), who worked for Jack Faucett Associates, Inc., a management consulting company, and Eno Center for Transportation. He was raised in the D.C. area.

Kulash attended Beauvoir School and graduated from St. Albans School in 1994. Kulash attended the Interlochen Arts Camp.

Kulash attended Brown University. There, he played in the bands: A La Playa, Calixto Chinchile, and Square. He released three CDs in his senior year: an album of experimental Elvis covers (for his senior project), an eponymously titled five-song EP from his electronic pop band Square, and Appendices, a collection of more than a dozen miscellaneous recordings from his time in college, including solo songs, collaborations with friends, class projects, studio experiments, and recordings from previous bands. Included on the Appendices record are the original recordings of "Bye Bye Baby", which was later re-recorded for OK Go's debut record, and four songs from a never-finished EP for his punk band A La Playa. In May 1998, Kulash won Brown University's Weston Prize in music composition. Kulash graduated from Brown University in 1998, with a concentration in Art-Semiotics.

== Career ==
As a result of courses he took in electronic music, Kulash became interested in more highly produced, carefully crafted music. After graduation from Brown, Kulash moved to Chicago, and in 1998 formed OK Go. After playing in Chicago and appearances on NPR's This American Life, OK Go signed to Capitol Records. They have released five albums: OK Go, Oh No, Of the Blue Colour of the Sky, Hungry Ghosts and most recently And the Adjacent Possible in April 2025. Prior to this, in 1996, he was in a band named Calixto Chinchile in which he played an early version of the OK Go song, ″Hello My Treacherous Friends.″

He was greatly influenced by many bands from the Washington D.C. area, such as Fugazi, Ted Leo and the Pharmacists, and Lungfish. He is also a fan of post-hardcore and indie rock. He was also one half of the Washington, D.C.–based independent record label Level Records (1994–1996). Level Records released various 7"s, compilations, and CDs for bands such as Branch Manager and Frodus.

On March 9, 2010, Kulash announced OK Go's departure from EMI via their YouTube channel. Their new label is called Paracadute.

In August 2006, Kulash appeared on an episode of The Colbert Report to discuss the band putting their music videos on YouTube instead of going through the normal corporate video-making process. OK Go made another appearance in April 2010, performing their track "This Too Shall Pass" from their album Of the Blue Colour of the Sky.

In 2023, Kulash co-directed the comedy-drama film The Beanie Bubble, alongside his wife, screenwriter and director Kristin Gore.

== Personal life ==
Kulash was previously married to artist Shana Lutker and later designer Ambra Medda.

In 2016, he married Kristin Gore; at Protestant Episcopal Cathedral Foundation schools: Beauvoir School, St. Albans School, National Cathedral School, they attended high school on the same campus. They live in Los Angeles.

In early 2008, Kulash wrote a passage in Ben Karlin's book Things I've Learnt from Women Who've Dumped Me. Kulash described one of his previous, unsuccessful relationships, involving a dog which he shared with his partner.

On February 19, 2010, The New York Times printed his op-ed piece entitled "WhoseTube?", which discussed the relationship between musicians, record labels, and the Internet. Kulash had previously written two other op-eds in the New York Times: one in 2008 about Net Neutrality and another in 2005 about the Sony BMG CD copy protection scandal. He has also testified in Congress in favor of Net Neutrality.

In March 2014, Kulash was part of a viral video, titled "First Kiss".

In February 2020, Kulash and Gore contracted COVID-19 when there had only been six prior confirmed cases in California, their state of residence.
