= Grammy Award for Best Music Video =

Honor presented for quality music videos

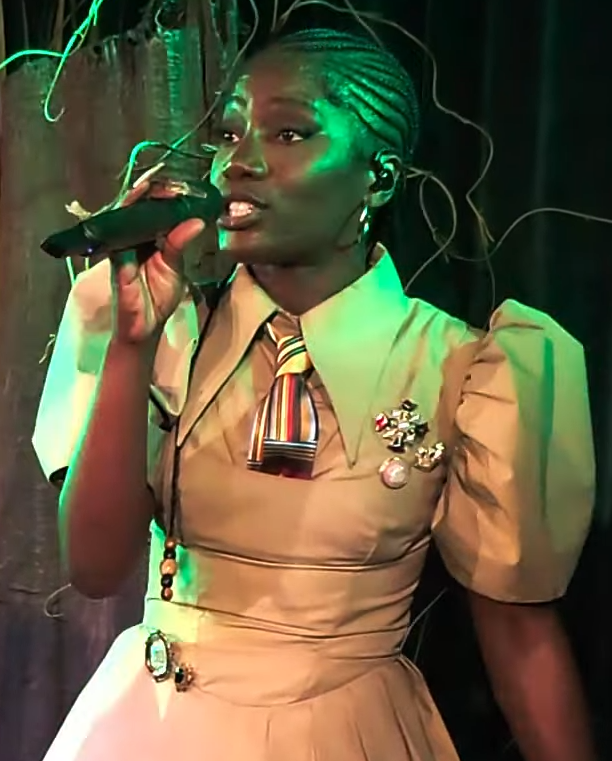
- The 2026 recipient, "Anxiety" by Doechii.
- Awarded for: Quality short form music videos
- Country: United States
- Presented by: National Academy of Recording Arts and Sciences
- First award: 1984
- Currently held by: "Anxiety" (2026)
- Website: grammy.com

The Grammy Award for Best Music Video is an accolade presented at the Grammy Awards, a ceremony that was established in 1958 and originally called the Gramophone Awards, to performers, directors, and producers of quality short form music videos. Honors in several categories are presented at the ceremony annually by the National Academy of Recording Arts and Sciences of the United States to "honor artistic achievement, technical proficiency and overall excellence in the recording industry, without regard to album sales or chart position".

Originally called the Grammy Award for Best Video, Short Form, the award was first presented in 1984, as was a similar award for Best Long Form Music Video. From 1986 to 1997, the category name was changed to Best Music Video, Short Form. However, in 1988 and 1989, the award criteria were changed and the video awards were presented under the categories Best Concept Music Video and Best Performance Music Video. The awards were returned to the original format in 1990. The category was called Best Short Form Music Video until 2012, from 2013 it was shortened to Best Music Video. Award recipients include the performers, directors, and producers associated with the winning videos, except for its first two years when the Grammy went to the performing artist only. For unknown reasons, the award for the Best Music Video in 1987 - Brothers in Arms by Dire Straits - went to the band only, not to the director(s) or producer(s).

Kendrick Lamar holds the record for the most wins as a performer in this category, with three. Mark Romanek holds the record for the most wins as a director, with a total of three. Icelandic singer Björk holds the record for the most nominations as a performer without a win, with four. Taylor Swift became the first artist to win the category with a sole directing credit for their own music video when she won in 2023 for All Too Well: The Short Film.

== Recipients and nominees ==
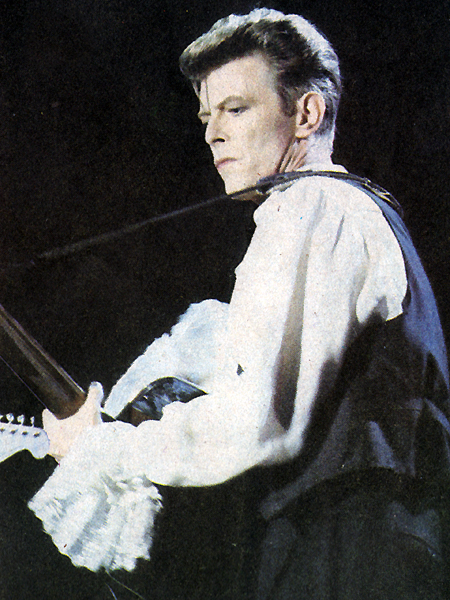
David Bowie received the award for "Jazzin' for Blue Jean".

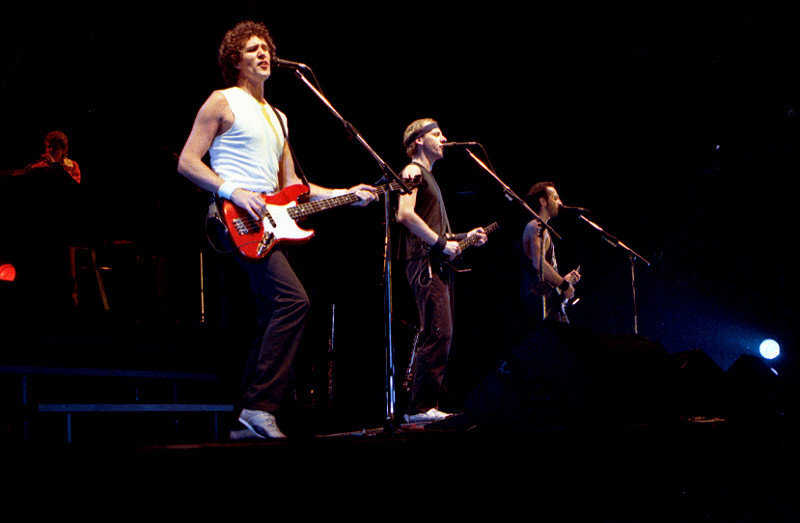
English band Dire Straits received the award for "Brothers in Arms".

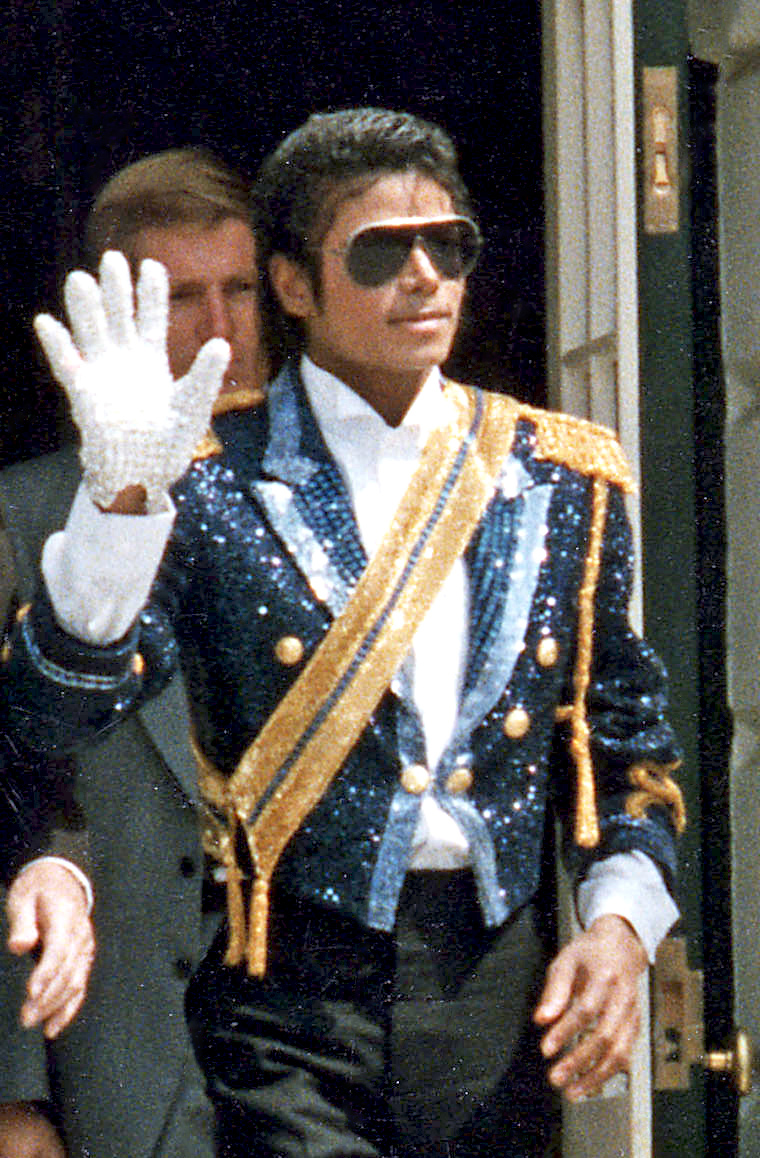
Michael Jackson has won the award twice for "Leave Me Alone" and "Scream".

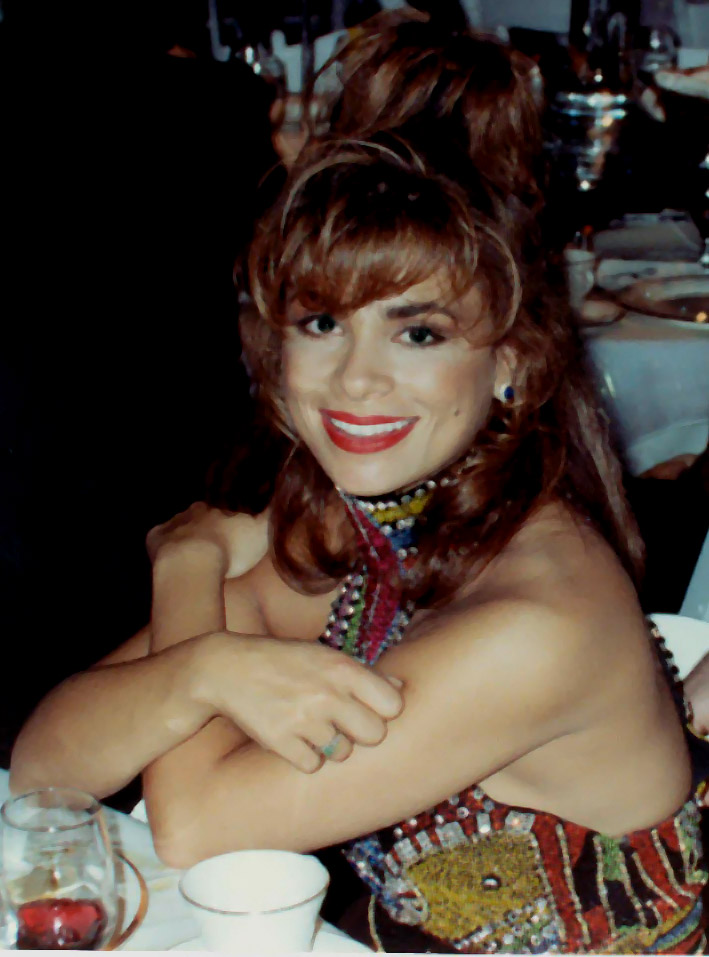
1991 award winner for "Opposites Attract", Paula Abdul.

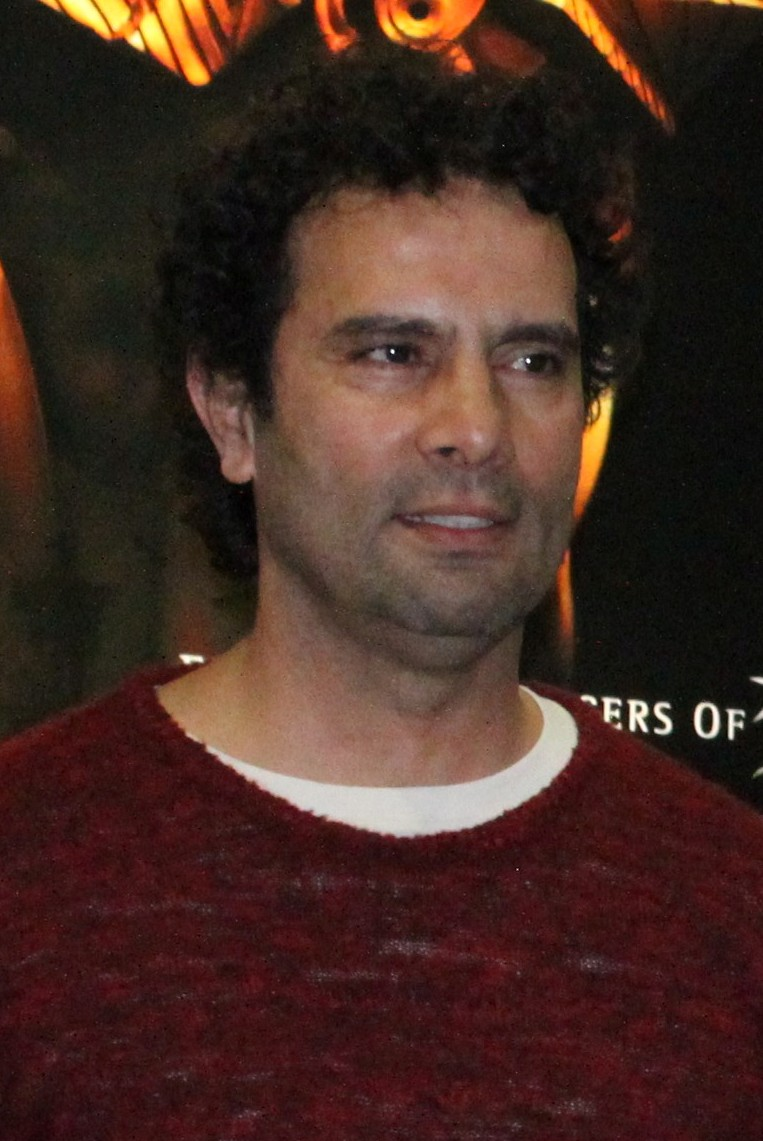
Tarsem Singh won the award for R.E.M.'s "Losing My Religion".

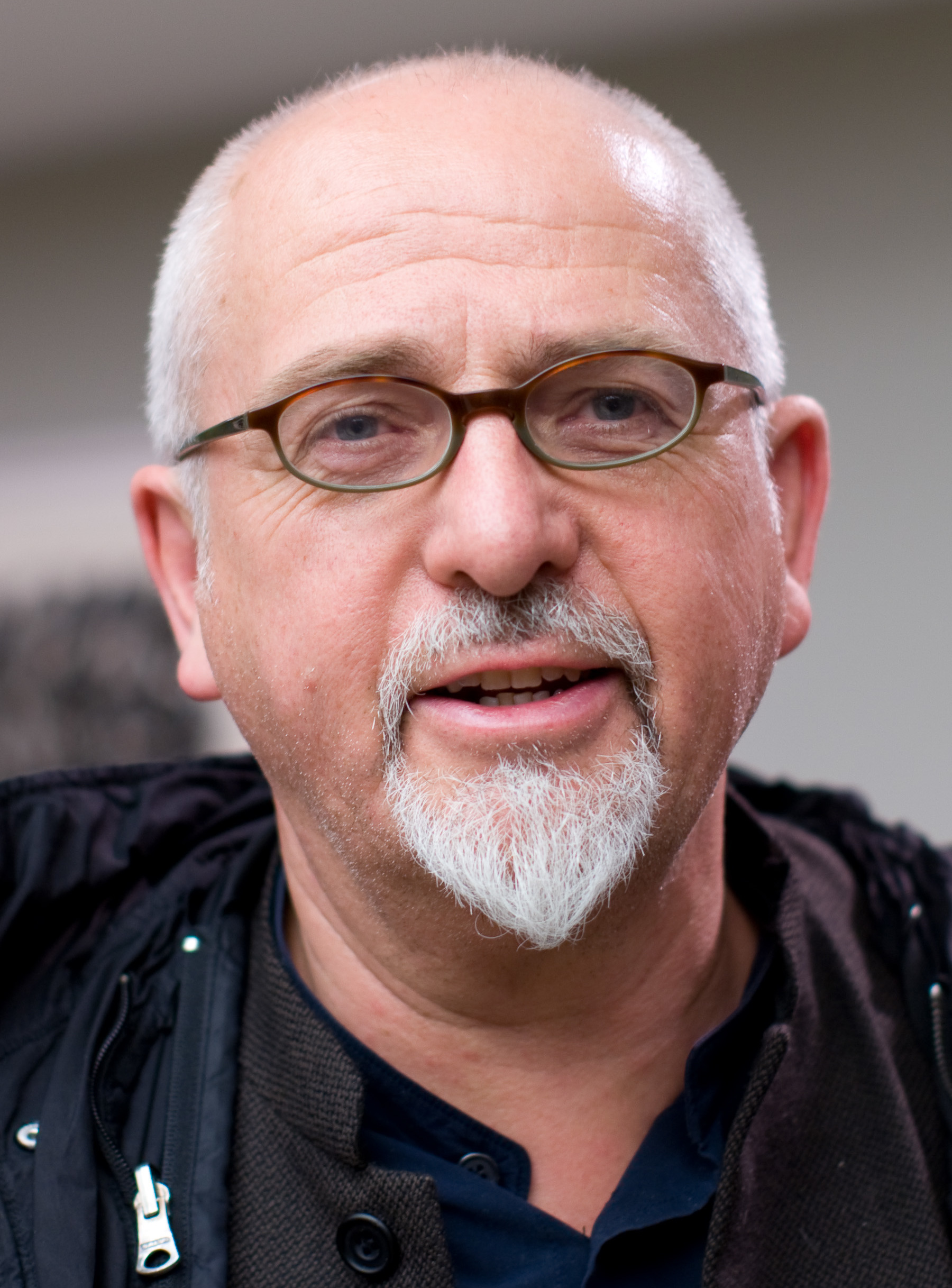
Two-time winner Peter Gabriel.

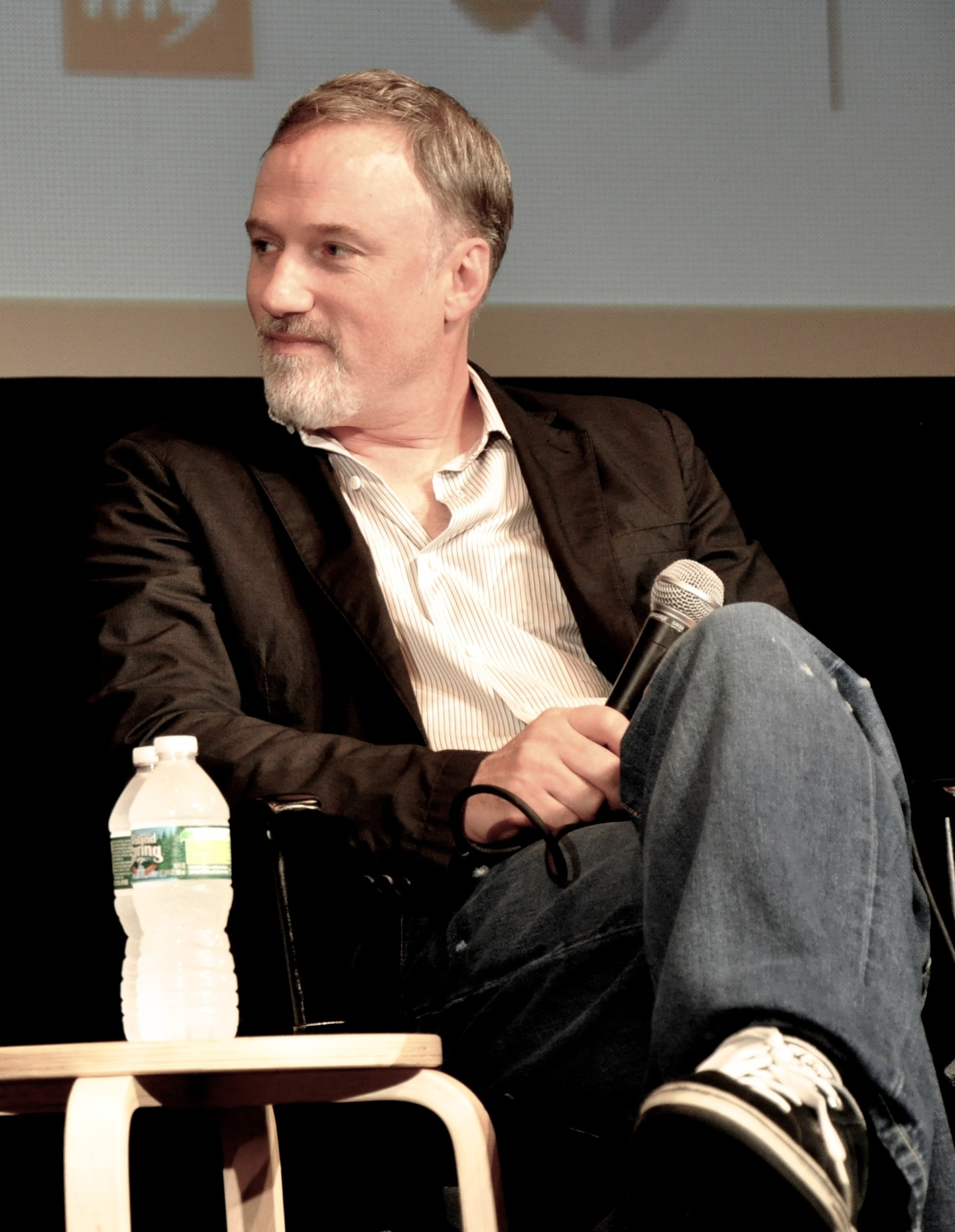
1995 and 2014 winner, director David Fincher.

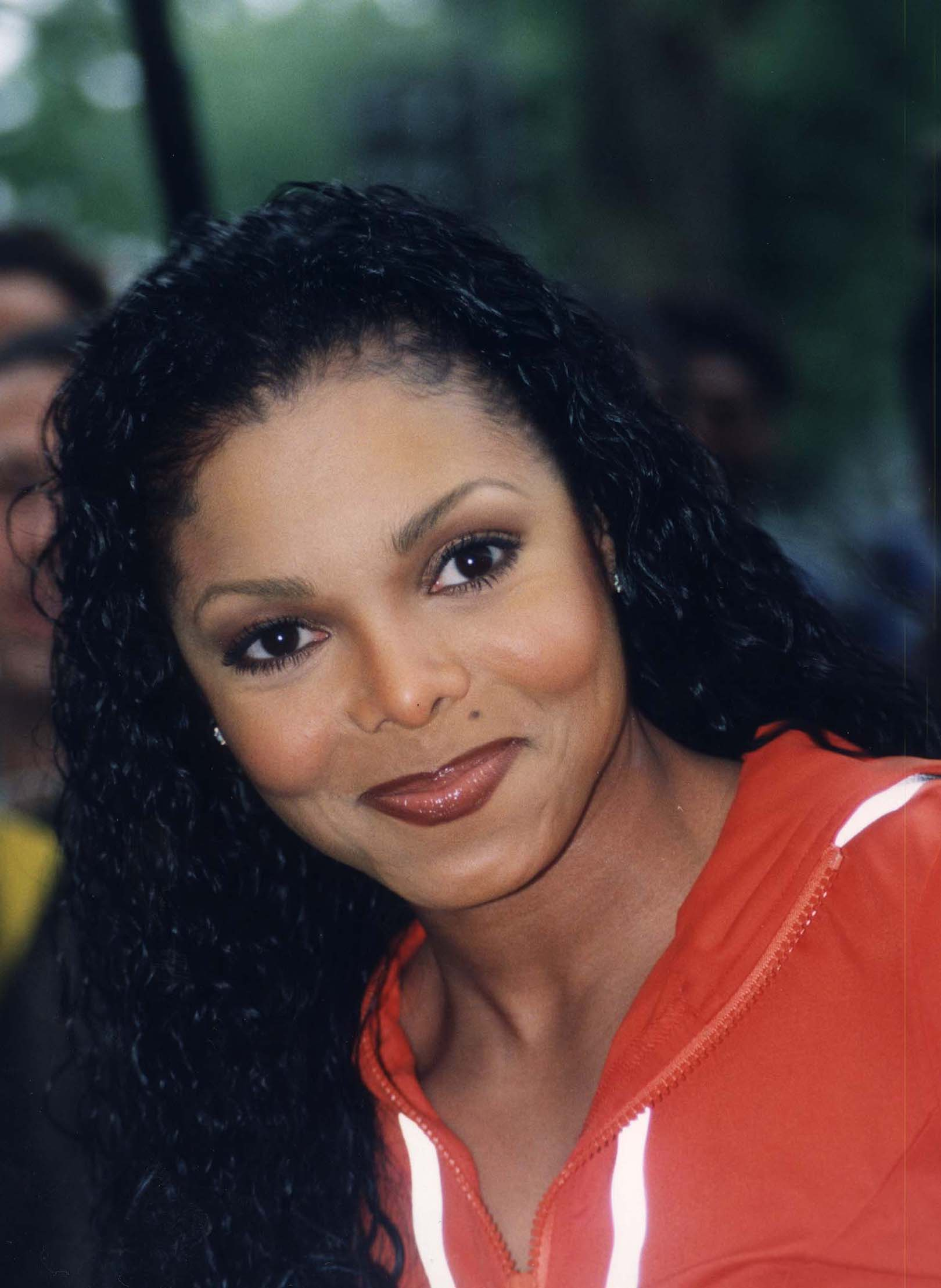
Two-time winner Janet Jackson.

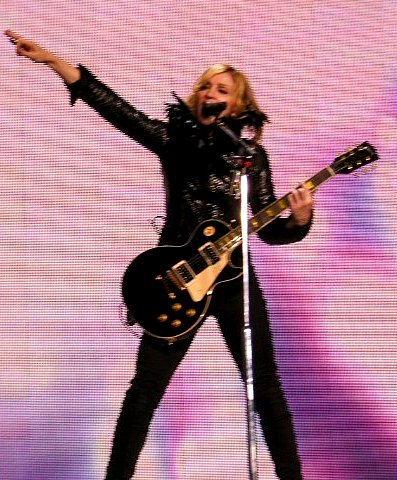
1999 award winner, Madonna, performing "Ray of Light" on the "Confessions Tour".

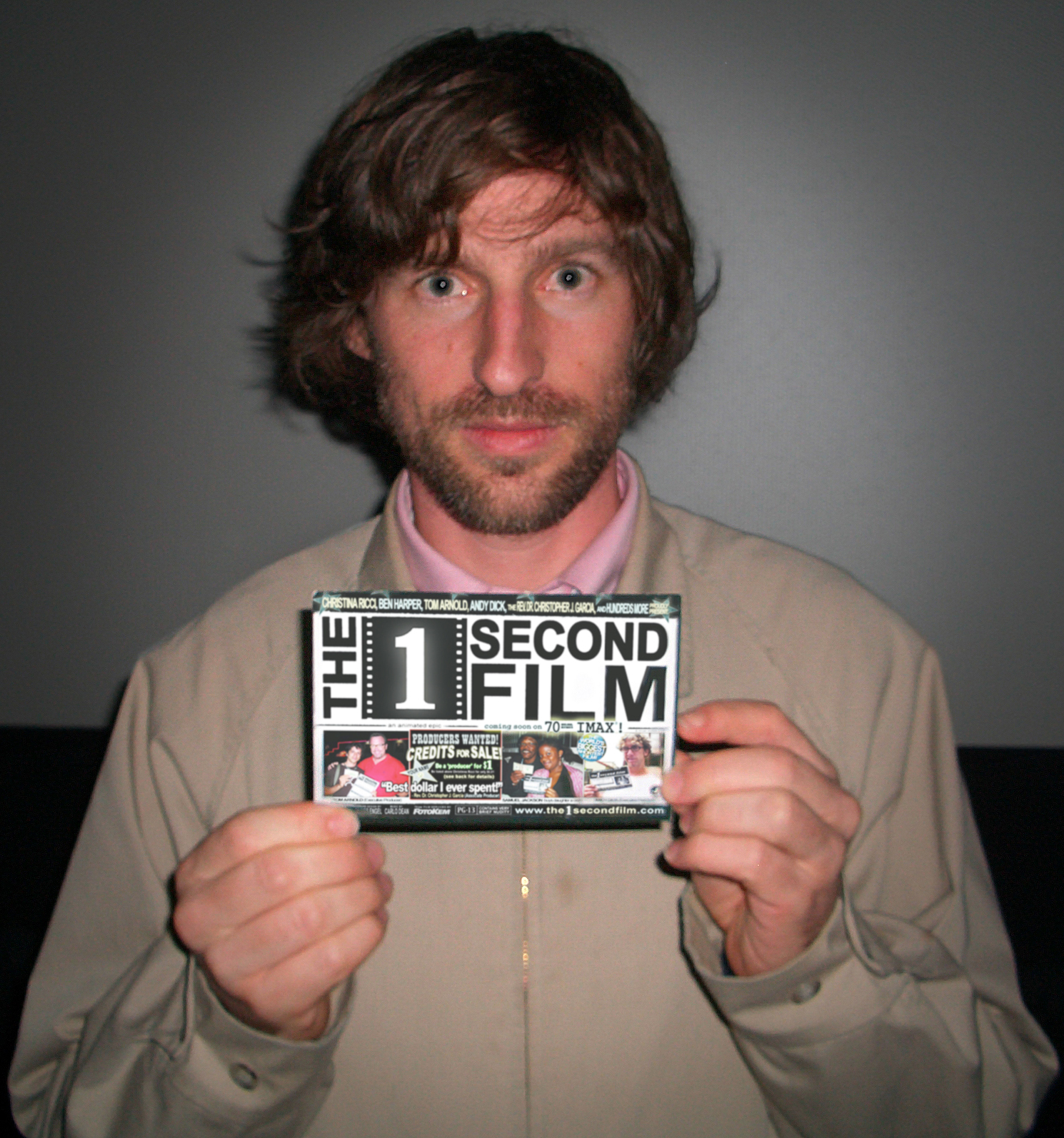
2002 award winner for directing the music video for "Weapon of Choice", Spike Jonze.

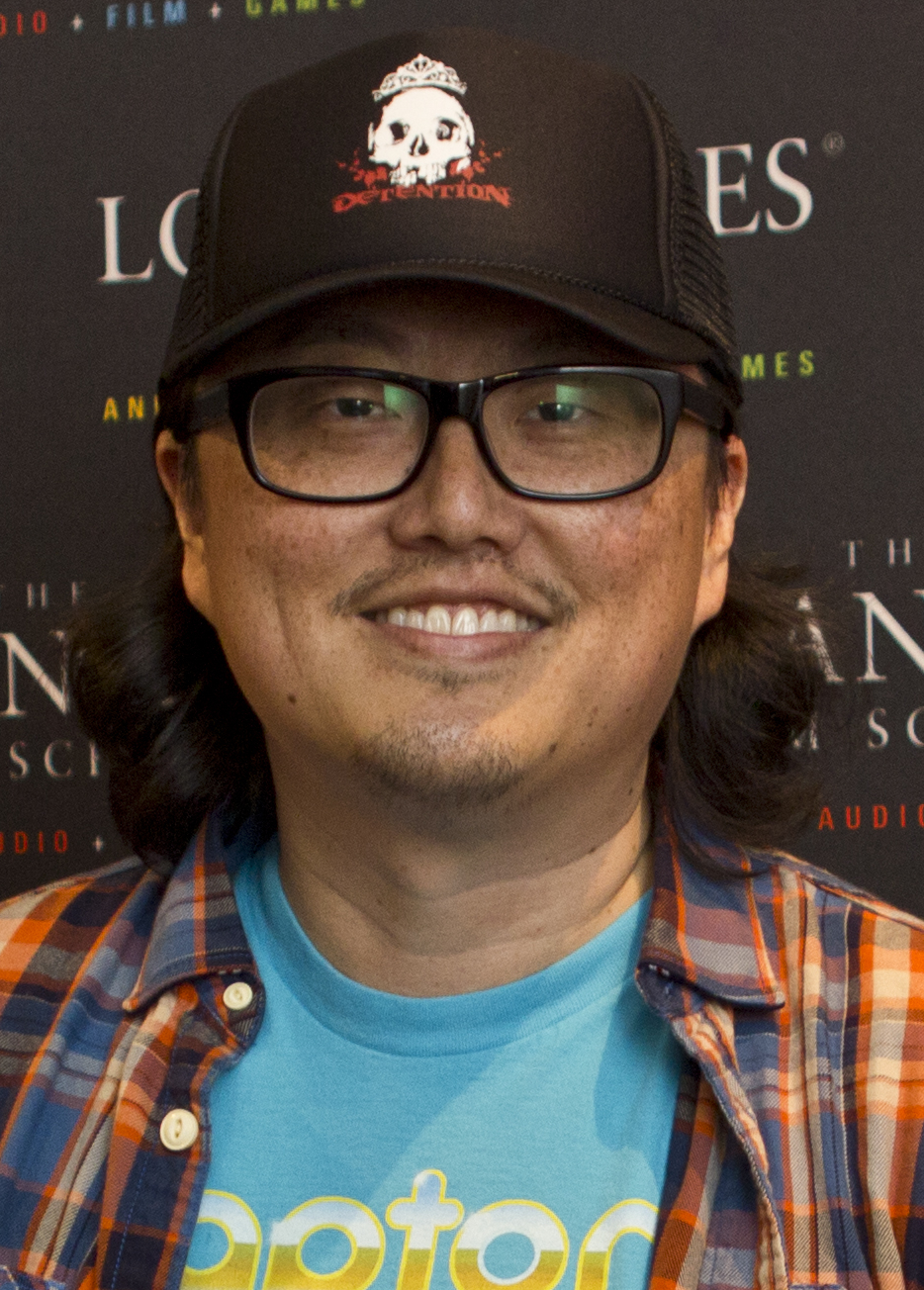
Two-time winner, director Joseph Kahn.

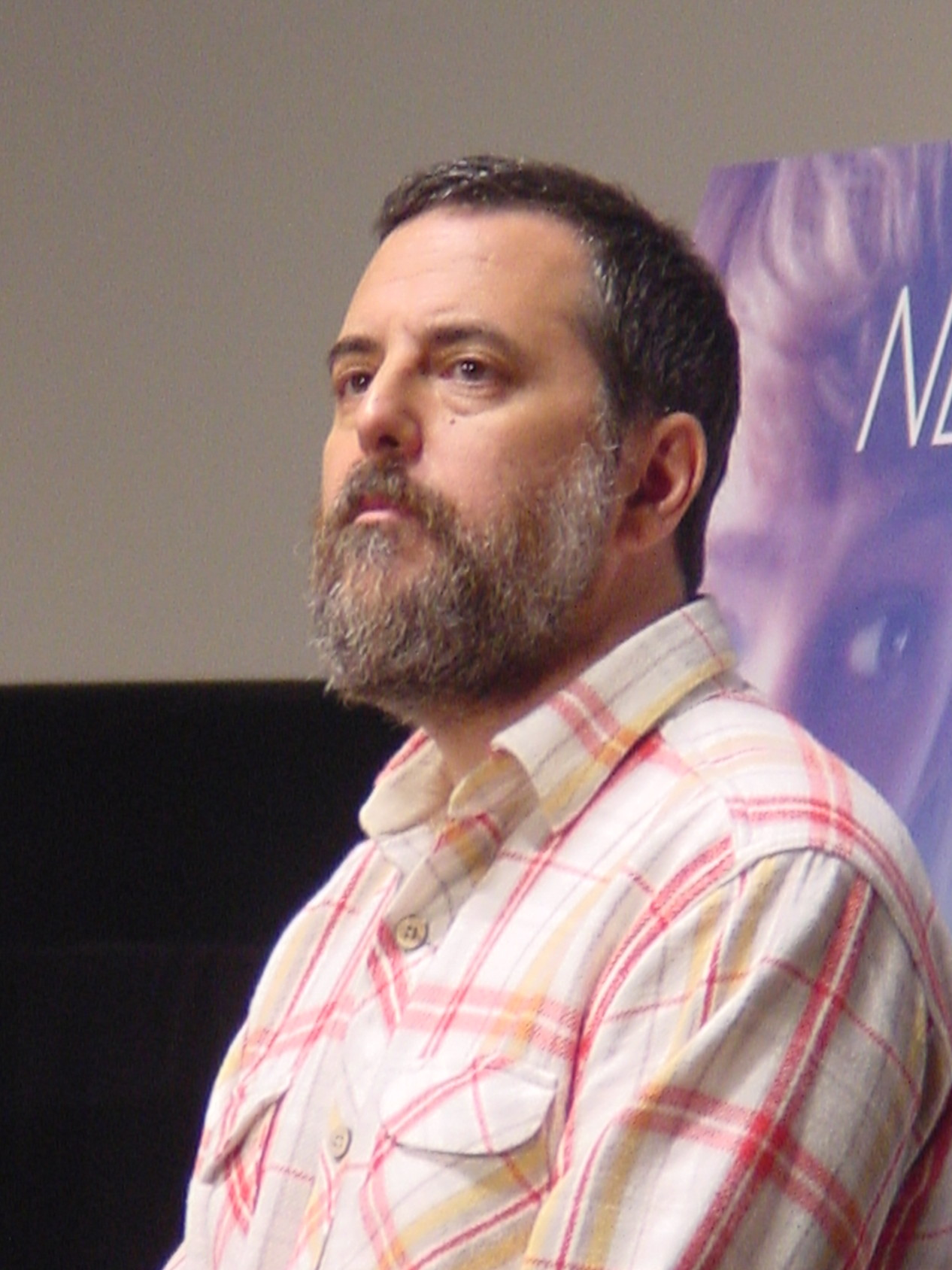
Director Mark Romanek holds the record of most wins for a director with three.

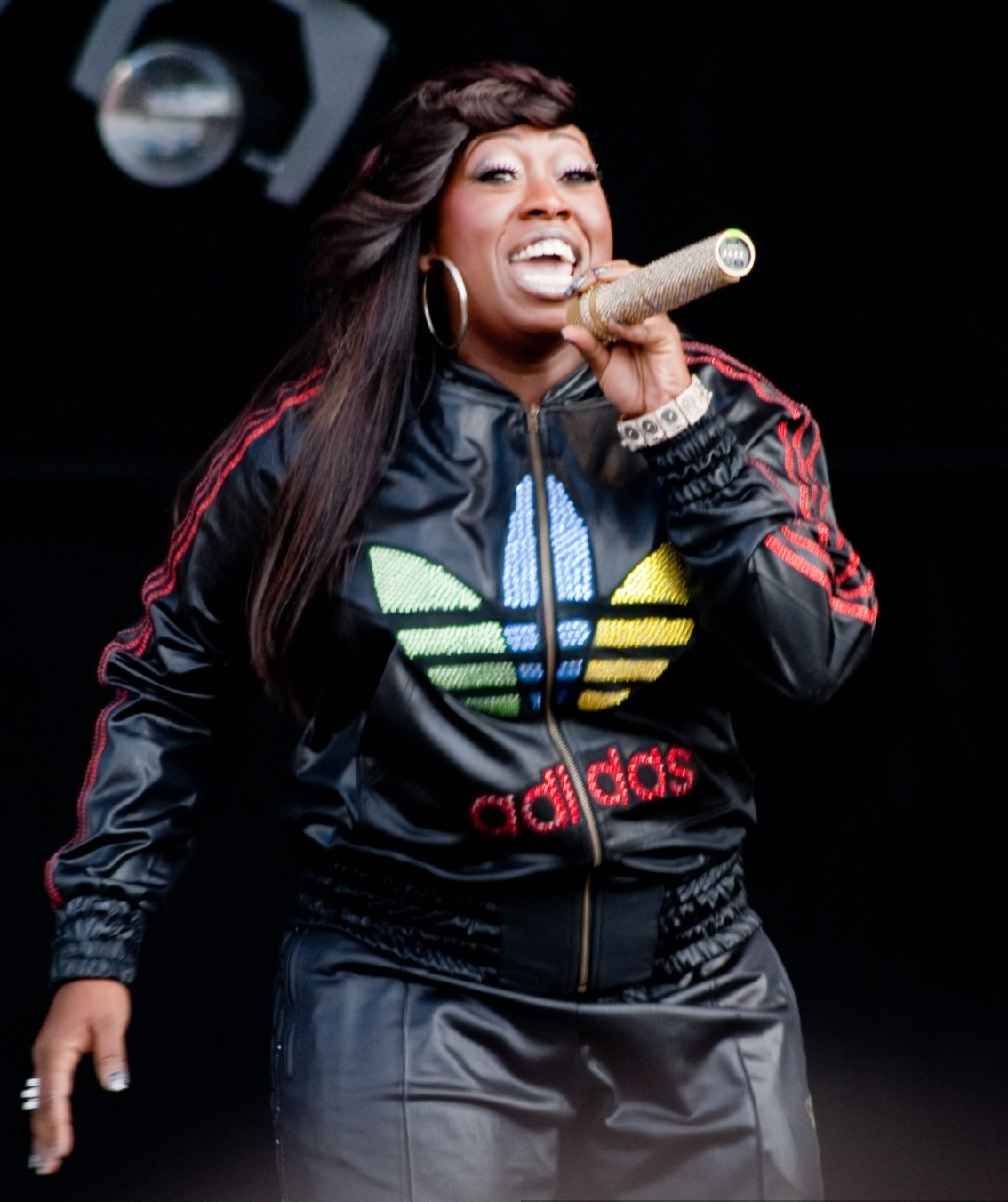
Missy Elliott won for "Lose Control", her collaboration with Ciara and Fatman Scoop.

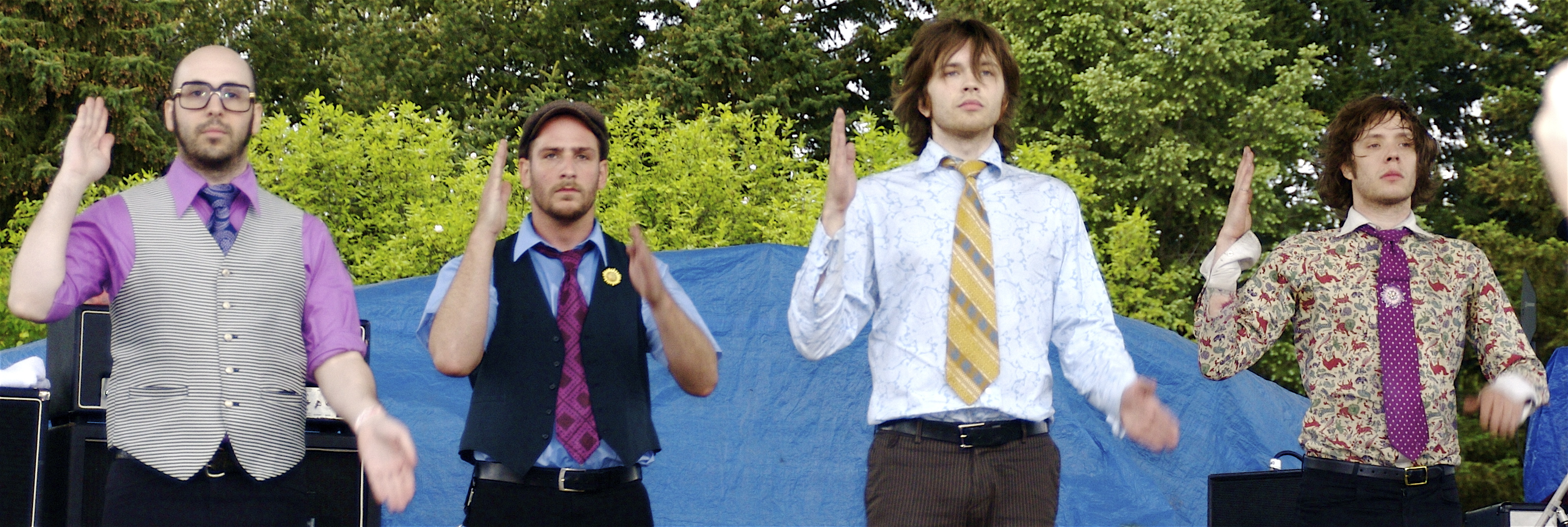
Members of the band OK Go, among winners of the 2007 award for "Here It Goes Again", performing in 2006.

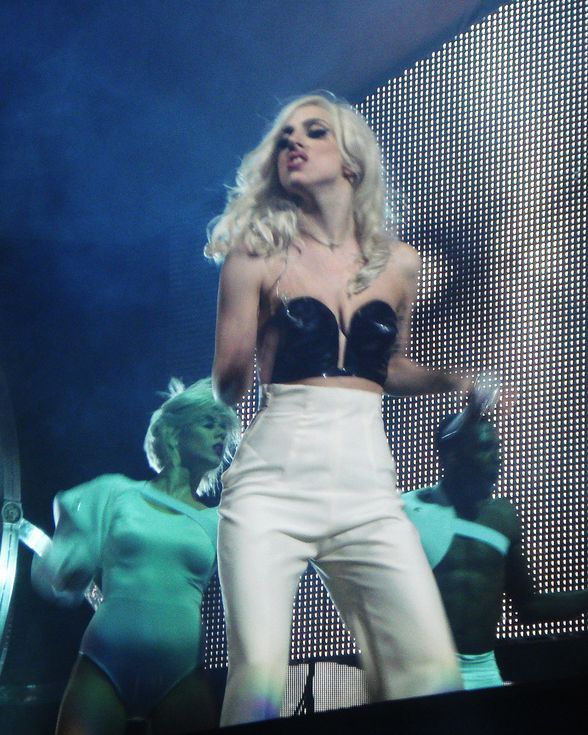
2011 award winner for "Bad Romance", Lady Gaga.

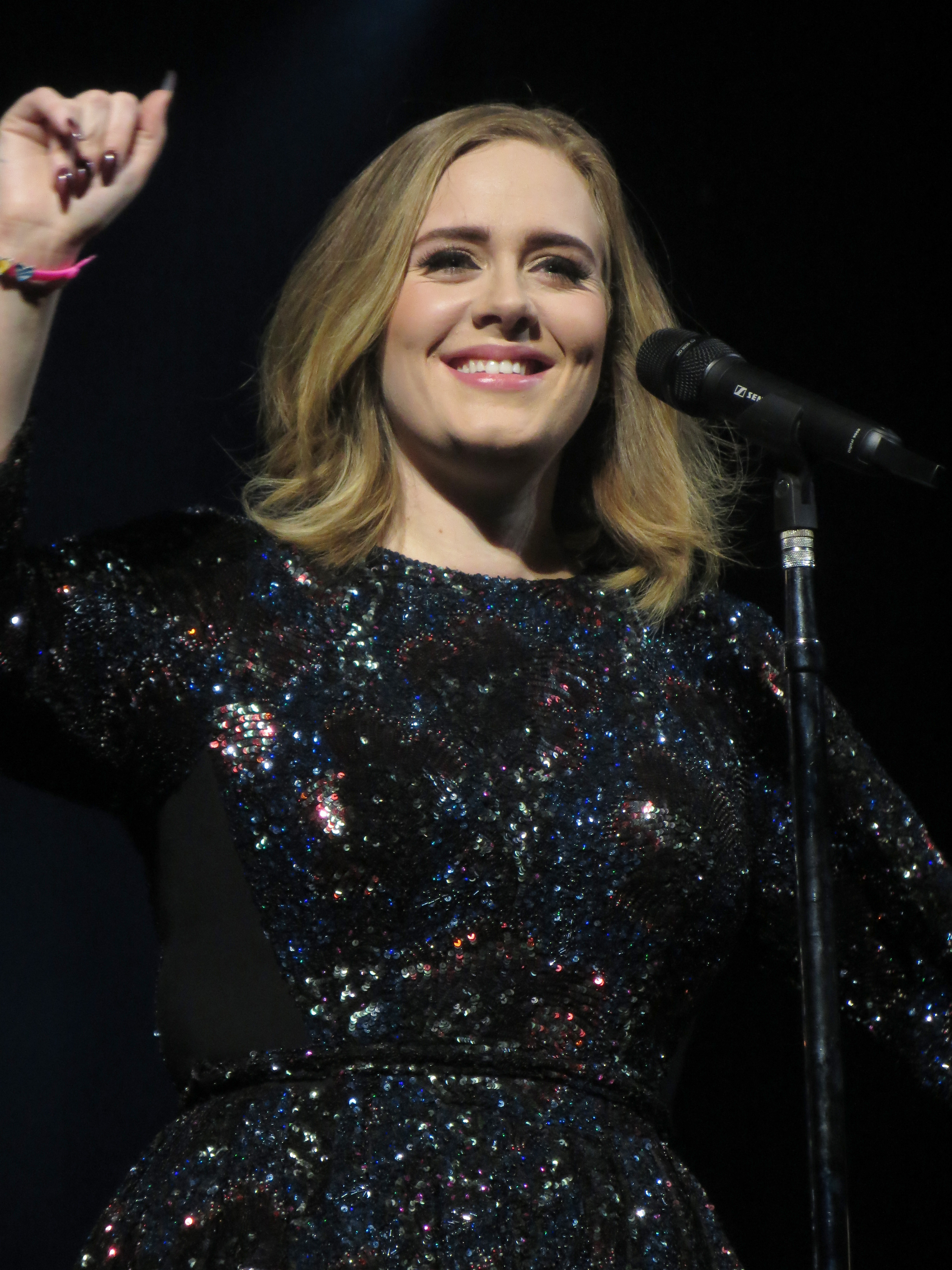
2012 award winner for "Rolling in the Deep", Adele.

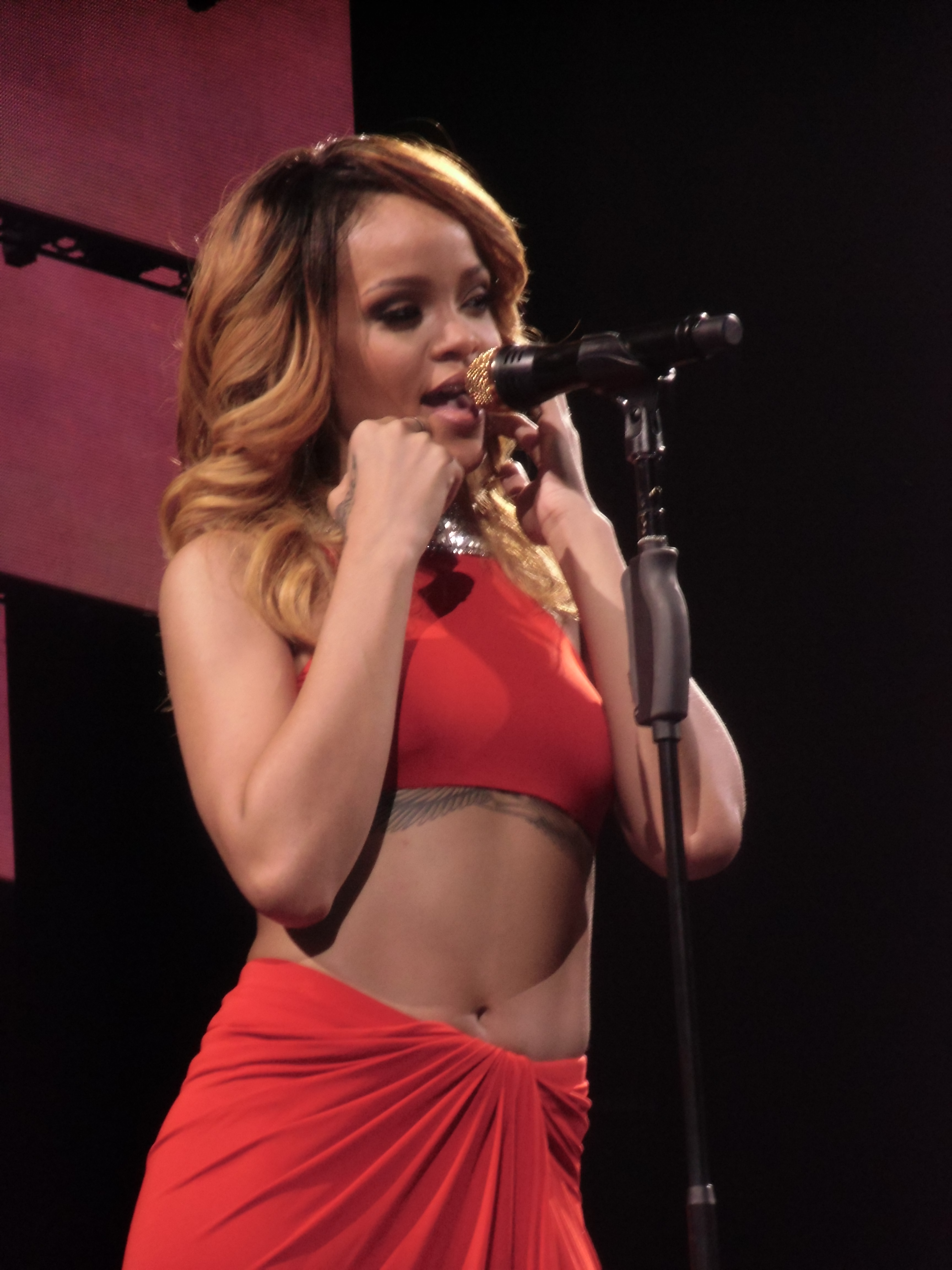
2013 award winner for "We Found Love", Rihanna.

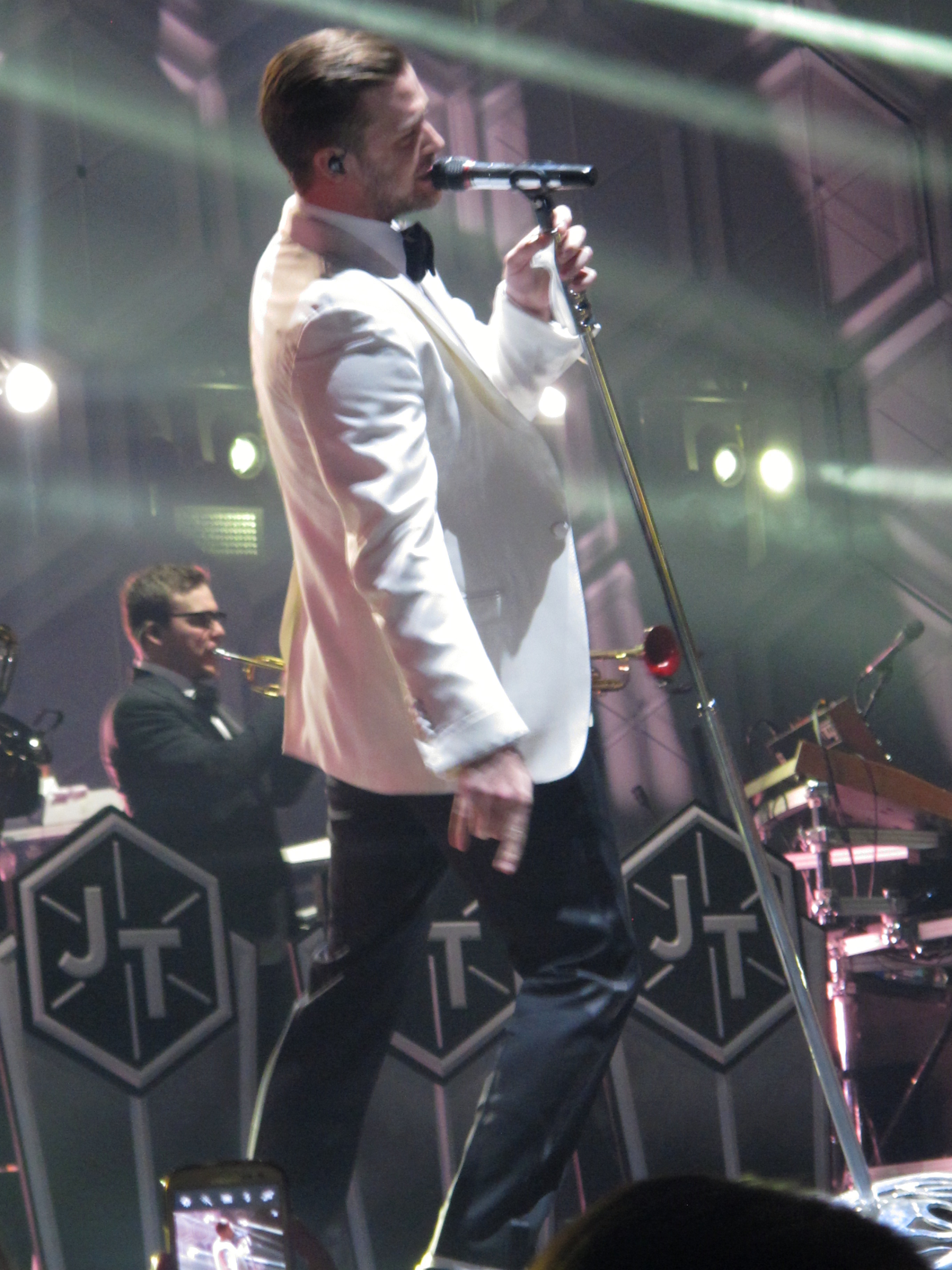
2014 award winner for "Suit & Tie", Justin Timberlake.

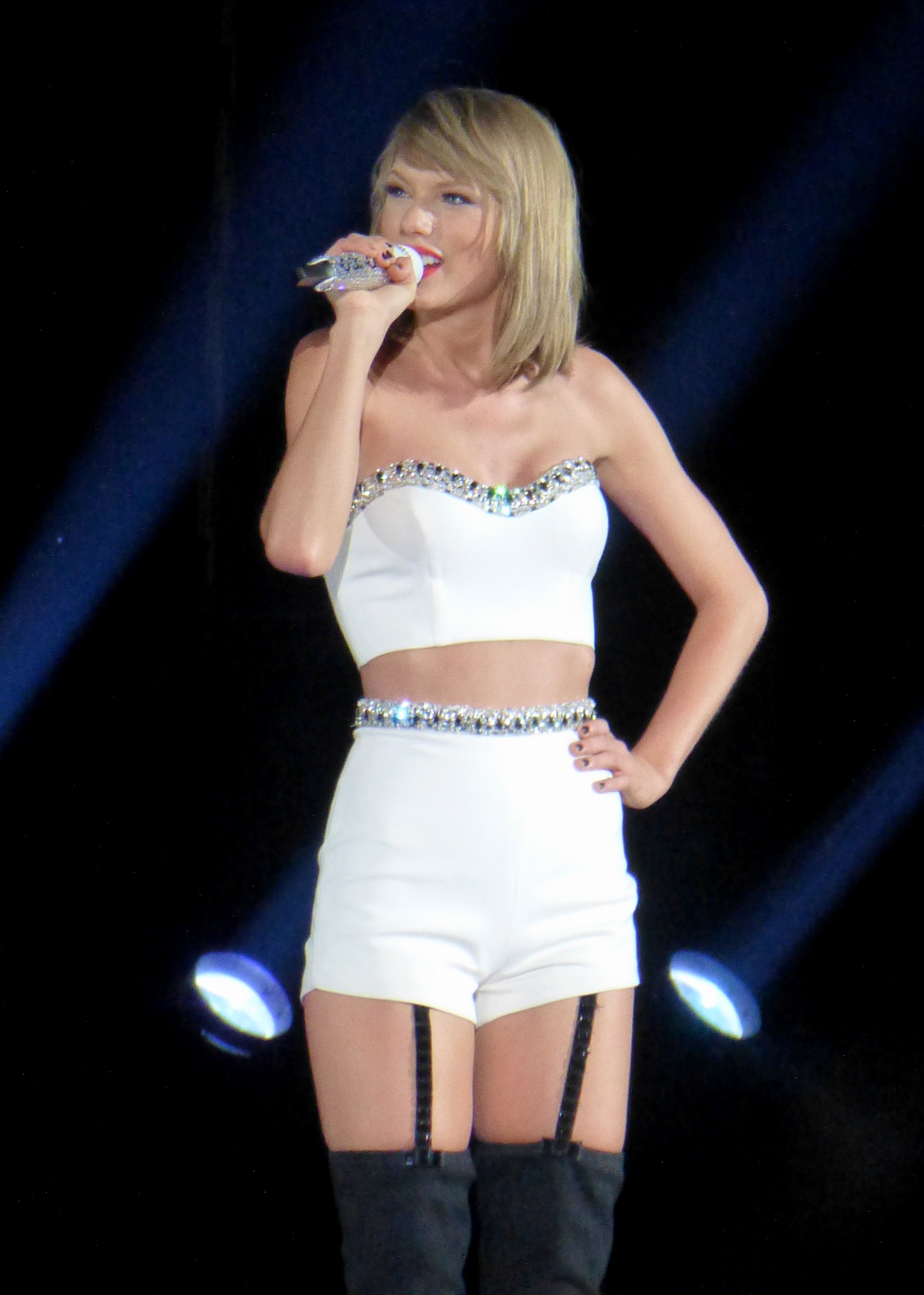
Two time winner Taylor Swift. She first won the award in 2016 for "Bad Blood" and again in 2023 for All Too Well: The Short Film.

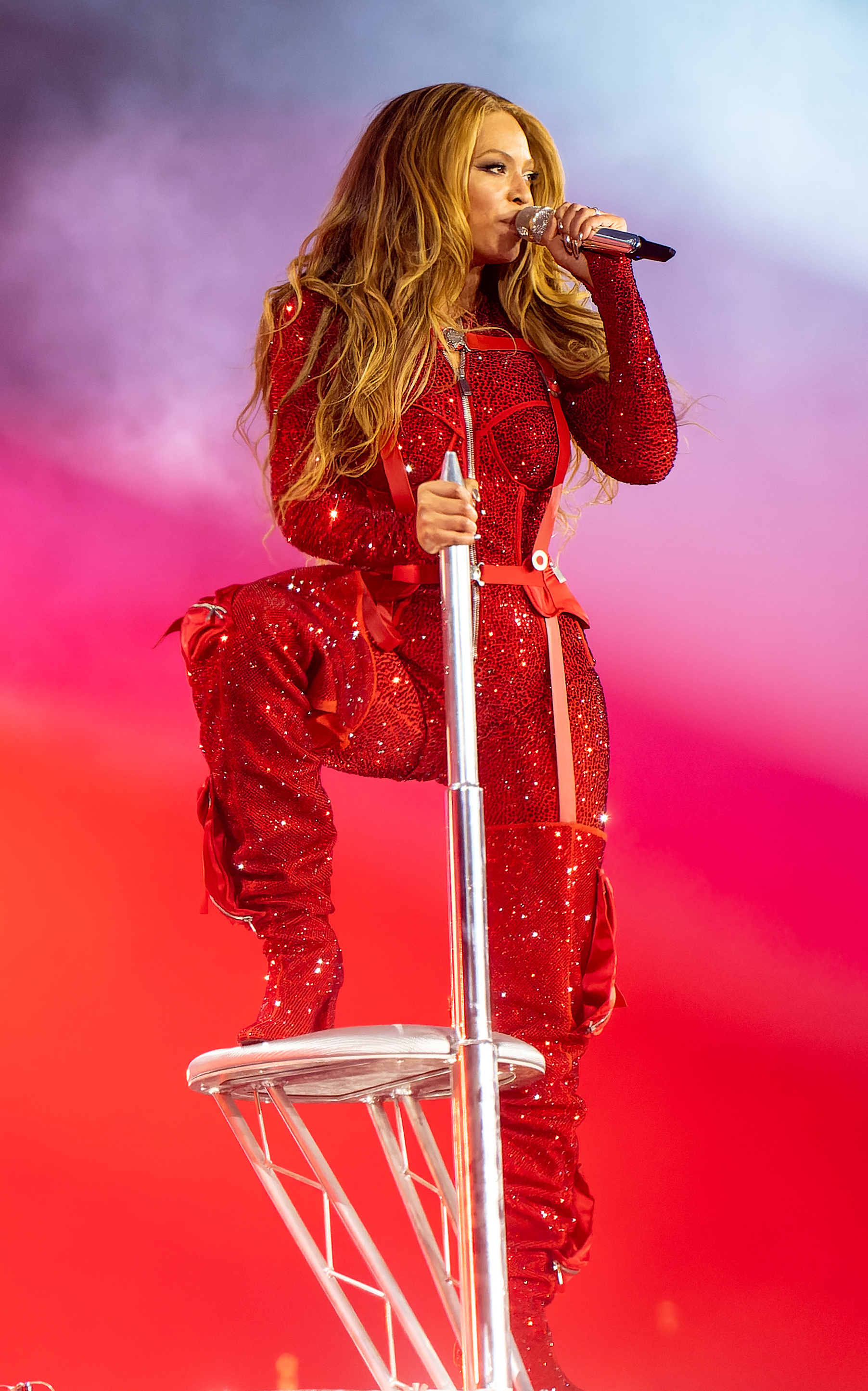
Beyoncé has won the award twice for "Formation" in 2017 and "Brown Skin Girl" in 2021.

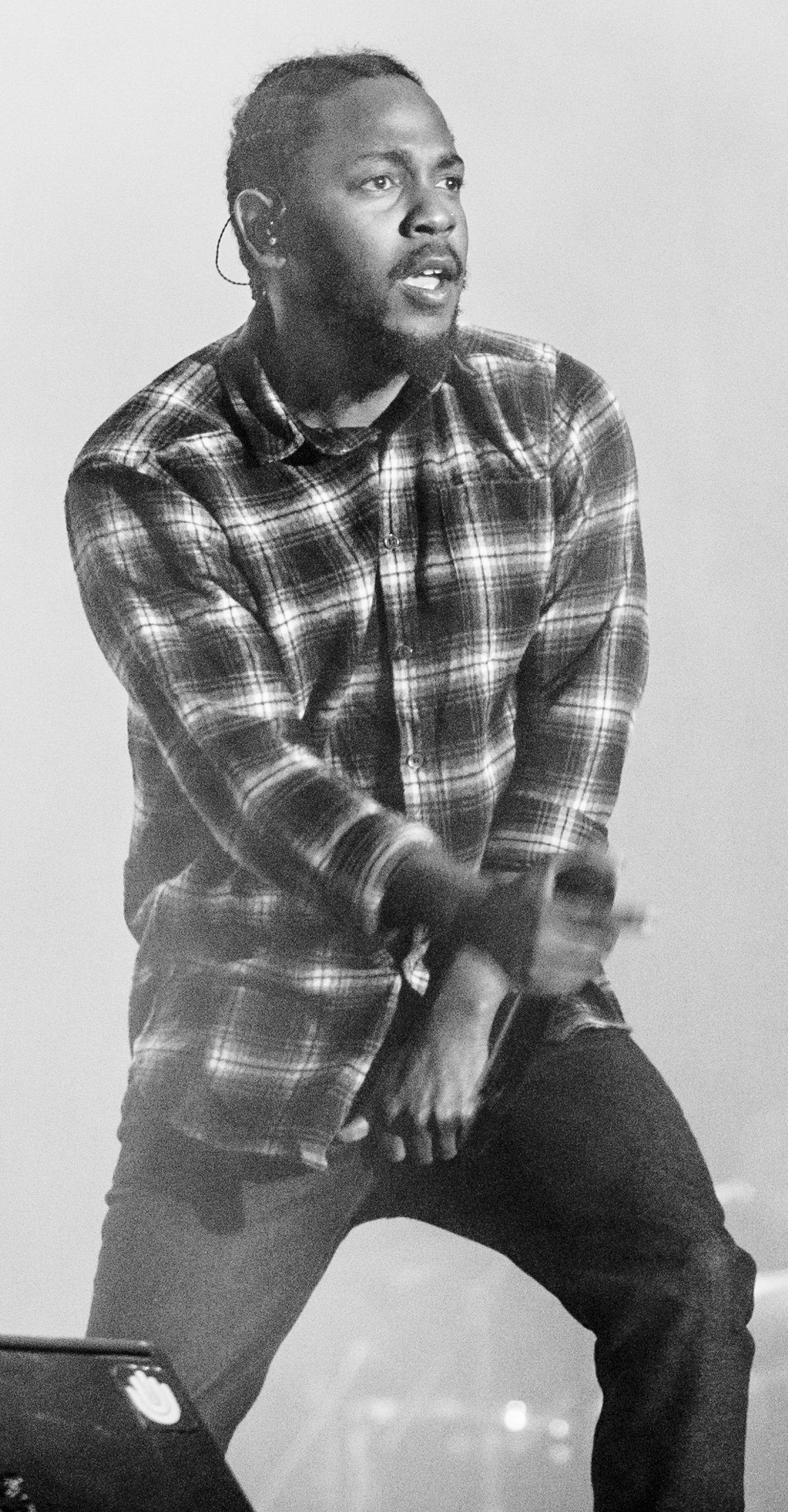
Three time Award winner, Kendrick Lamar, he won for his collaboration on "Bad Blood" in 2016, for "Humble" in 2018 and for "Not Like Us" in 2025.

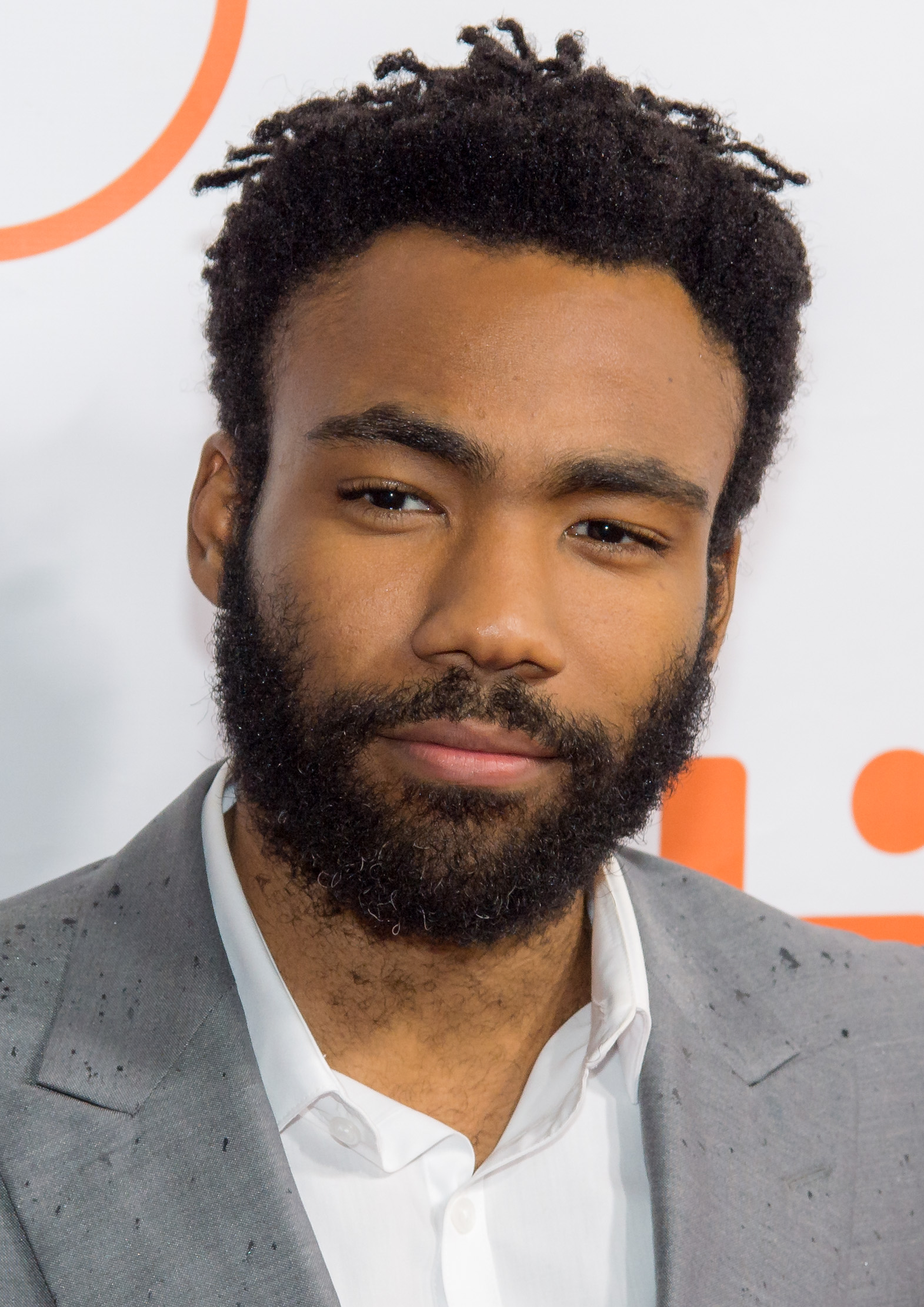
2019 winner Childish Gambino for "This is America".

=== 1980s ===
Year^{[I]}	Work	Artist(s)	Director(s) and Producer(s)^{[II]}
1984
1984	"Girls on Film"/"Hungry Like the Wolf"	Duran Duran	—N/a
1984	Bill Wyman	Bill Wyman	—N/a
1984	A Flock of Seagulls	A Flock of Seagulls	—N/a
1984	Rod Stewart: Tonight He's Yours	Rod Stewart	—N/a
1984	Videosyncracy	Todd Rundgren	—N/a
1985
1985	Jazzin' for Blue Jean	David Bowie	—N/a
1985	Ashford & Simpson	Ashford & Simpson	—N/a
1985	Phil Collins	Phil Collins	—N/a
1985	Rubber Rodeo Scenic Views	Rubber Rodeo	—N/a
1985	Thomas Dolby	Thomas Dolby	—N/a
1985	"Twist of Fate"	Olivia Newton-John	—N/a
1986
1986	"We Are the World – The Video Event"	USA for Africa	Tom Trbovich, director; Quincy Jones, producer
1986	The Daryl Hall and John Oates Video Collection — 7 Big Ones	Hall & Oates	Mick Haggerty and C.D. Taylor, directors
1986	"Do They Know It's Christmas?"	Band Aid	Dave Bridges and Rob Wright, directors; Midge Ure, producer
1986	No Jacket Required	Phil Collins	Jim Yukich, director
1986	"Private Dancer"	Tina Turner	Brian Grant, director
1987
1987	"Brothers in Arms"	Dire Straits	—N/a
1987	"Brother Where You Bound"	Supertramp	Rene Daalder, director
1987	"Runaway"	Louis Cardenas	Cayce B. Redding, director
1987	Rupert and the Frog Song	Paul McCartney	—N/a
1987	So Excited	The Pointer Sisters	Richard Perry, director
1988	—N/a^{[III]}	—N/a	—N/a
1989	—N/a^{[III]}	—N/a	—N/a

=== 1990s ===
Year^{[I]}	Work	Artist(s)	Director(s) and Producer(s)^{[II]}
1990
1990	"Leave Me Alone"	Michael Jackson	Jim Blashfield, director; Jim Blashfield, Paul Diener, Frank DiLeo and Jerry Kramer, producers
1990	"The Living Years"	Mike and the Mechanics	Tim Broad, director; Frank Hilton and Tessa Watts, producers
1990	"Orinoco Flow (Sail Away)"	Enya	Michael Geoghegan, director; Paul McNally, producers
1990	"Something to Hold on To"	Trevor Rabin	Jeff Stein, director; Julio Flores, producer
1990	"There's a Tear in My Beer"	Hank Williams Jr. and Hank Williams	Ethan Russell, director; Joanne Gardner and Ethan Russell, producers
1991
1991	"Opposites Attract"	Paula Abdul	Michael Patterson and Candice Reckinger, directors; Sharon Oreck, producer
1991	"All I Want"	The Lightning Seeds	Tarsem Singh, director; Lexi Godfrey, producer
1991	"Another Day in Paradise"	Phil Collins	Jim Yukich, director; Paul Flattery, producer
1991	"Nothing Compares 2 U"	Sinéad O'Connor	John Maybury, director; Hugh Symmonds, producer
1991	"Oh Father"	Madonna	David Fincher, director; Tim Clawson, producer
1992
1992	"Losing My Religion"	R.E.M.	Tarsem Singh, director; Dave Ramser, producer
1992	"Calling Elvis"	Dire Straits	Steve Barron, director; Adam Whitaker, producer
1992	"Series of Dreams"	Bob Dylan	Meiert Avis, director; Ben Dossett, producer
1992	"The Thunder Rolls"	Garth Brooks	Bud Schaetzle, director; Martin Fischer, producer
1992	"When You Wish Upon a Star"	Billy Joel	Scott Garen, director; B. A. Robertson and Rhaz Zeisler, producers
1993
1993	"Digging in the Dirt"	Peter Gabriel	John Downer, director/producer
1993	"Church"	Lyle Lovett	Matt Mahurin, director; Louise Feldman, producer
1993	"Free Your Mind"	En Vogue	Mark Romanek, director; Krista Montagna, producer
1993	"Kiko and the Lavender Moon"	Los Lobos	Ondrej Rudavsky, director; Axel Ericson, producer
1993	"What God Wants"	Roger Waters	Tony Kaye, director; Sarah Whistler, producer
1994
1994	"Steam"	Peter Gabriel	Stephen R. Johnson, director; Prudence Fenton, producer
1994	"Beautiful Girl"	INXS	Tom Gorai and Mark Pellington, directors; Victoria Strange, producer
1994	"Everybody Hurts"	R.E.M.	Jake Scott, director; June Guterman, producer
1994	"Human Behaviour"	Björk	Michel Gondry, director; Georges Bermann, producer
1994	"Runaway Train"	Soul Asylum	Tony Kaye, director; Roger Hunt, producer
1995
1995	"Love Is Strong"	The Rolling Stones	David Fincher, director; Ceán Chaffin, producer
1995	"Agolo"	Angélique Kidjo	Michael Meyer, director; Arno Moria, producer
1995	"Fire on Babylon"	Sinéad O'Connor	Michel Gondry, director; Georges Bermann, producer
1995	"Go West"	Pet Shop Boys	Howard Greenhalgh, director; Megan Hollister, producer
1995	"Jurassic Park"	"Weird Al" Yankovic	Scott Nordlund and Mark Osborne, directors/producers
1995	"Lucas with the Lid Off"	Lucas	Michel Gondry, director; Georges Bermann, producer
1996
1996	"Scream"	Michael Jackson & Janet Jackson	Mark Romanek, director; Ceán Chaffin, producer
1996	"Dis Is Da Drum"	Herbie Hancock	Mark Dippé, director; Clint Goldman, producer
1996	"Famine"	Sinéad O'Connor	Andy Delaney and Monty Whitebloom, directors; Sid Daffarn, producer
1996	"It's Oh So Quiet"	Björk	Spike Jonze, director; Vincent Landay, producer
1996	"What Would You Say"	Dave Matthews Band	David Hogan, director; Jack Hardwicke, producer
1997
1997	"Free as a Bird"	The Beatles	Joe Pytka, director; Vincent Joliet, producer
1997	"Earth Song"	Michael Jackson	Nicholas Brandt, director; Bridget Blake-Wilson, producer
1997	"Ironic"	Alanis Morissette	Stephane Sednaoui, director; Dawn Rose, producer
1997	"Tonight, Tonight"	The Smashing Pumpkins	Jonathan Dayton and Valerie Faris, directors; Bart Lipton, producer
1997	"Walking Contradiction"	Green Day	Roman Coppola, director; Stev Fredriksz, producer
1998
1998	"Got 'til It's Gone"	Janet Jackson	Mark Romanek, director; Aris McGarry, producer
1998	"Early to Bed"	Morphine	Jamie Caliri, director; Adam Stern, producer
1998	"How Come, How Long"	Babyface featuring Stevie Wonder	F. Gary Gray, director; Craig Fanning, producer
1998	"I Care 'Bout You"	Milestone	Mark Gerard, director; Melinda Nugent, producer
1998	"Stinkfist"	Tool	Donna Langston and Kevin Willis, producers
1999
1999	"Ray of Light"	Madonna	Jonas Åkerlund, director; Nicola Doring and Billy Proveda, producers
1999	"All Around the World"	Oasis	Jonathan Dayton and Valerie Faris, directors; Bart Lipton, producer
1999	"Bachelorette"	Björk	Michel Gondry, director; Georges Bermann and Julie Fong, producers
1999	"Do the Evolution"	Pearl Jam	Kevin Altieri and Todd McFarlane, directors; Terry Fitzgerald and Joe Pearson, producers
1999	"Pink"	Aerosmith	Doug Nichol, director; Georges Bermann and Jim Czarnecki, producers

=== 2000s ===
Year^{[I]}	Work	Artist(s)	Director(s) and Producer(s)^{[II]}
2000
2000	"Freak on a Leash"	Korn	Jonathan Dayton and Valerie Faris, Todd McFarlane and Graham Morris, directors; Terry Fitzgerald and Bart Lipton, producers
2000	"All Is Full of Love"	Björk	Chris Cunningham, director; Cindy Bulmar, producer
2000	"Back at One"	Brian McKnight	Francis Lawrence, director; Heather Jansson, producer
2000	"Everything Is Everything"	Lauryn Hill	Sanji, director; Phillipa Davis, John Owen and Steve Reiss, producers
2000	"Unpretty"	TLC	Paul Hunter, director; Kati Haberstock, producer
2001
2001	"Learn to Fly"	Foo Fighters	Jesse Peretz, director; Tina Nakane, producer
2001	"Broken Home"	Papa Roach	Marcos Siega, director; Shirley Moyers, producer
2001	"Fire"	Busta Rhymes	Busta Rhymes and Hype Williams, directors; Rubin Mendoza, producer
2001	"What Do You Say"	Reba McEntire	Robert Deaton and George Flanigen, directors/producers
2001	"Will 2K"	Will Smith	Robert Caruso, director; Jack Hardwicke and Paul Hill, producers
2002
2002	"Weapon of Choice"	Fatboy Slim featuring Bootsy Collins	Spike Jonze, director; Vincent Landay and Deannie O'Neill, producers
2002	"Don't Tell Me"	Madonna	Jean-Baptiste Mondino, director; Maria Gallagher, producer
2002	"Fly Away from Here"	Aerosmith	Joseph Kahn, director; Greg Tharp, producer
2002	"Ms. Jackson"	OutKast	F. Gary Gray, director; Meredyth Frattolillo, producer
2002	"One Minute Man"	Missy Elliott featuring Ludacris	David Meyers, director; Ron Mohrhoff, producer
2003
2003	"Without Me"	Eminem	Joseph Kahn, director; Greg Tharp, producer
2003	"Days Go By"	Dirty Vegas	Rob Leggatt and Leigh Marling, directors; Anna Brunoro, producer
2003	"The Knoc"	Knoc-turn'al, Dr. Dre and Missy Elliott	Jeff Richter, director; Chris Palladino, producer
2003	"My Culture"	1 Giant Leap featuring Robbie Williams and Maxi Jazz	Tim Hope, director
2003	"One Mic"	Nas	Chris Robinson, director; Dawn Rose, producer
2004
2004	"Hurt"	Johnny Cash	Mark Romanek, director; Aris McGarry, producer
2004	"Concrete Angel"	Martina McBride	Robert Deaton and George Flanigen IV, directors; Steve Lamar, producer
2004	"Die Another Day"	Madonna	Traktor, directors; Jim Bouvet, producer
2004	"Hey Ya!"	OutKast	Bryan Barber, director; William Green, producer
2004	"The Scientist"	Coldplay	Jamie Thraves, director; Sally Llewelyn, producer
2005
2005	"Vertigo"	U2	Alex and Martin, directors; Grace Bodie, producer
2005	"American Idiot"	Green Day	Samuel Bayer, director; Tim Lynch, producer
2005	"Flawless (Go to the City)"	George Michael	Jake Scott, director; David Mitchell, producer
2005	"Take Me Out"	Franz Ferdinand	Jonas Odell, director; Julia Parfitt, producer
2005	"Walkie Talkie Man"	Steriogram	Michel Gondry, director; Julie Fong, producer
2006
2006	"Lose Control"	Missy Elliott featuring Ciara and Fatman Scoop	Missy Elliott and Dave Meyers, directors; Joseph Sasson, producer
2006	"Feel Good Inc."	Gorillaz	Pete Candeland and Jamie Hewlett, directors
2006	"Feels Just Like It Should"	Jamiroquai	Joseph Kahn, director; MaryAnn Tanedo, producer
2006	"God's Will"	Martina McBride	Robert Deaton and George Flanigen IV, directors; Mark Kalbfeld and Steve Lamar, producers
2006	"World on Fire"	Sarah McLachlan	Sophie Muller, director
2007
2007	"Here It Goes Again"	OK Go	Dan Konopka, Damian Kulash Jr., Timothy Nordwind, Andy Ross and Trish Sie, directors/producers
2007	"8th of November"	Big & Rich	Robert Deaton, George Flanigen IV and Marc Oswald, directors; Robert Deaton, George Flanigen IV, Steve Lamar and Marc Oswald, producers
2007	"Dani California"	Red Hot Chili Peppers	Tony Kaye, director; Rachel Curl, producer
2007	"When You Were Young"	The Killers	Anthony Mandler, director; Everardo Gout and Gina Leonard, producers
2007	"Writing on the Walls"	Underoath	Anders Forsman, Ragnar Granstrand and Linus Johansson, directors; Maria Berggren, Anders Forsman, Ragnar Granstrand and Linus Johansson, producers
2008
2008	"God's Gonna Cut You Down"	Johnny Cash	Tony Kaye, director; Rachel Curl, producer
2008	"1234"	Feist	Patrick Daughters, director; Geoff McLean, producer
2008	"D.A.N.C.E."	Justice	Jonas & François and So Me, directors/producers
2008	"Gone Daddy Gone"	Gnarls Barkley	Chris Milk, director; Barbara Benson, producer
2008	"Typical"	Mutemath	Israel Anthem, director; Brandon Arolfo, producer
2009
2009	"Pork and Beans"	Weezer	Mathew Cullen, director; Bernard Rahill, producer
2009	"Another Way to Die"	Jack White and Alicia Keys	P. R. Brown and MK12, directors; Dexton Deboree, Lance Ebeling, Mick Ebeling, Sheira Rees-Davies and Jane Tredget, producers
2009	"Honey"	Erykah Badu	Erykah Badu and Chris Robinson, directors; Megan Gutman, producer
2009	"House of Cards"	Radiohead	James Frost, director; Dawn Fanning, producer
2009	"Who's Gonna Save My Soul"	Gnarls Barkley	Chris Milk, director; Anne Johnson, producer

=== 2010s ===
Year^{[I]}	Work	Artist(s)	Director(s) and Producer(s)^{[II]}
2010
2010	"Boom Boom Pow"	Black Eyed Peas	Mark Kudsi and Mathew Cullen, directors; Javier Jimenez, Anna Joseph and Patrick Nugent, producers
2010	"Her Morning Elegance"	Oren Lavie	Oren Lavie, Merav Nathan and Yuval Nathan, directors; Michal Dayan, Chris Douridas and Oren Lavie, producers
2010	"Life in Technicolor II"	Coldplay	Dougal Wilson, director; Matthew Fone, producer
2010	"Mr. Hurricane"	Beast	Ben Levine, director; Sach Baylin-Stern, producer
2010	"Wrong"	Depeche Mode	Patrick Daughters, director; Jonathan Lia, producer
2011
2011	"Bad Romance"	Lady Gaga	Francis Lawrence, director; Kathy Angstadt, Nicole Ehrlich and Heather Heller, producers
2011	"Ain't No Grave / The Johnny Cash Project"	Johnny Cash	Chris Milk, director; Jennifer Heath, Aaron Koblin and Rick Rubin, producers
2011	"Fuck You"	Cee Lo Green	Matt Stawski, director; Paul Bock, producer
2011	"Love the Way You Lie"	Eminem and Rihanna	Joseph Kahn, director; MaryAnn Tanedo, producer
2011	"Stylo"	Gorillaz, Mos Def and Bobby Womack	Pete Candeland and Jamie Hewlett, directors; Cara Speller, producer
2012
2012	"Rolling in the Deep"	Adele	Sam Brown, director; Hannah Chandler, producer
2012	"All Is Not Lost"	OK Go	Itamar Kubovy, Damian Kulash Jr. and Trish Sie, directors; Shirley Moyers, producer
2012	"First of the Year (Equinox)"	Skrillex	Tony Truand, director; David Gitlis & Noah Klein, producers
2012	"Lotus Flower"	Radiohead	Garth Jennings, director/producer
2012	"Perform This Way"	"Weird Al" Yankovic	"Weird Al" Yankovic, director; Cisco Newman, producer
2012	"Yes I Know"	Memory Tapes	Eric Epstein, director/producer
2013
2013	"We Found Love"	Rihanna and Calvin Harris	Melina Matsoukas, director; Juliette Larthe, Candice Ouaknine, Ben Sullivan and Inga Veronique, producers
2013	"Bad Girls"	M.I.A.	Romain Gavras, director/producer
2013	"Houdini"	Foster the People	The Daniels and Foster the People, directors; Gaetano Crupi, Saul Levitz and Candice Ouaknine, producers
2013	"No Church in the Wild"	Jay-Z and Kanye West featuring Frank Ocean and The-Dream	Romain Gavras, director; Mourad Belkeddar, producer
2013	"Run Boy Run"	Woodkid	Yoann Lemoine, director; Roman Pichon, producer
2014
2014	"Suit & Tie"	Justin Timberlake featuring Jay-Z	David Fincher, director; Timory King, producer
2014	"Can't Hold Us"	Macklemore & Ryan Lewis featuring Ray Dalton	Jon Jon Augustavo, Jason Koenig and Ryan Lewis, directors; Tricia Davis, Honna Kimmerer and Jenny Koenig, producers
2014	"I'm Shakin'"	Jack White	Dori Oskowitz, director; Saul Levitz and Candice Ouaknine, producers
2014	"Picasso Baby: A Performance Art Film"	Jay-Z	Mark Romanek, director; Shawn Carter and Aristides McGarry, producers
2014	"Safe and Sound"	Capital Cities	Grady Hall, director; Buddy Enright, Javier Jimenez, Danny Lockwood and Daniel Weisman, producers
2015
2015	"Happy"	Pharrell Williams	We Are from LA (Pierre Dupaquier and Clement Durou), directors; Kathleen Heffernan, Solal Micenmacher, Jett Steiger and Cedric Troadec, producers
2015	"Chandelier"	Sia	Daniel Askill and Sia, directors; Jennifer Heath and Jack Hogan, producers
2015	"The Golden Age"	Woodkid featuring Max Richter	Yoann Lemoine, director; Kathleen Heffernan, Roman Pichon Herrera, Christine Miller and Annabel Rosier, producers
2015	"Turn Down for What"	DJ Snake and Lil' Jon	The Daniels, directors; Judy Craig, Candice Ouaknine, Jonathan Wang and Bryan Younce, producers
2015	"We Exist"	Arcade Fire	David Wilson, director; Sue Yeon Ahn and Jason Baum, producers
2016
2016	"Bad Blood"	Taylor Swift featuring Kendrick Lamar	Joseph Kahn, director; Ron Mohrhoff, producer
2016	"Alright"	Kendrick Lamar	The Little Homies and Colin Tilley, directors; Brandon Bonfiglio, Dave Free, Andrew Lerios and Luga Podesta, producers
2016	"Freedom"	Pharrell Williams	Paul Hunter, director; Candice Dragonas and Nathan Scherrer, producers
2016	"I Feel Love (Every Million Miles)"	The Dead Weather	Cooper Roberts and Ian Schwartz, directors; Candice Dragonas and Nathan Scherrer, producers
2016	"LSD"	A$AP Rocky	Dexter Navy, director; Shin Nishigaki, producer
2017
2017	"Formation"	Beyoncé	Melina Matsoukas, director; Nathan Scherrer, producer
2017	"Gosh"	Jamie xx	Romain Gavras, director; Roman Pichon Herrera, producer
2017	"River"	Leon Bridges	Miles Jay, director; Dennis Beier, Allison Kunzman & Saul Levitz, producers
2017	"Up&Up"	Coldplay	Vania Heymann and Gal Muggia, directors; Candice Dragonas, Juliette Larthe, Nathan Scherrer and Natan Schottenfels, producers
2017	"Upside Down & Inside Out"	OK Go	Damian Kulash Jr. and Trish Sie, directors; Melissa Murphy and John O'Grady, producers
2018
2018	"Humble"	Kendrick Lamar	The Little Homies and Dave Meyers, directors; Jason Baum, Dave Free, Jamie Rabineau, Nathan K. Scherrer and Anthony Tiffith, producers
2018	"1-800-273-8255"	Logic featuring Alessia Cara & Khalid	Andy Hines, director; Brandon Bonfiglio, Mildred Delamota, Andrew Lerios, Luga Podesta and Alex Randall, producers
2018	"Makeba"	Jain	Lionel Hirle and Gregory Ohrel, directors; Yodelice, producer
2018	"The Story of O.J."	Jay-Z	Shawn Carter and Mark Romanek, directors; Daniel Midgley, Elizabeth Newman and Chaka Pilgrim, producers
2018	"Up All Night"	Beck	Nicolas Mendez and Lope Serrano, directors; Alba Barneda, Laura Serra Estorch and Oscar Romagosa, producers
2019
2019	"This Is America"	Childish Gambino	Hiro Murai, director; Ibra Ake, Jason Cole and Fam Rothstein, producers
2019	"Apeshit"	The Carters	Ricky Saiz, director; Mélodie Buchris, Natan Schottenfels and Erinn Williams, producers
2019	"I'm Not Racist"	Joyner Lucas	Joyner Lucas and Ben Proulx, directors; Joyner Lucas, producer
2019	"Mumbo Jumbo"	Tierra Whack	Marco Prestini, director; Sara Nassim, producer
2019	"Pynk"	Janelle Monáe	Emma Westenberg, director; Justin Benoliel and Whitney Jackson, producers

=== 2020s ===
Year^{[I]}	Work	Artist(s)	Director(s) and Producer(s)^{[II]}
2020
2020	"Old Town Road"	Lil Nas X featuring Billy Ray Cyrus	Calmatic, director; Candice Dragonas, Melissa Larsen and Saul Levitz, producers
2020	"Cellophane"	FKA Twigs	Andrew Thomas Huang, director; Alex Chamberlain, producer
2020	"Glad He's Gone"	Tove Lo	Vania Heymann and Gal Muggia, directors; Natan Schottenfels, producer
2020	"This Land"	Gary Clark Jr.	Savanah Leaf, director; Jason Cole, Danielle Hinde, Alicia Martinez and Devin Sarno, producers
2020	"We've Got to Try"	Chemical Brothers	Ninian Doff, director; Ellie Fry, producer
2021
2021	"Brown Skin Girl"	Beyoncé, Blue Ivy & Wizkid	Beyoncé Knowles-Carter and Jenn Nkiru, directors; Lauren Baker, Astrid Edwards, Nathan Scherrer and Erinn Williams, producers
2021	"Adore You"	Harry Styles	Dave Meyers, director; Nathan Scherrer, producer
2021	"Goliath"	Woodkid	Yoann Lemoine, director; Horace de Gunzbourg, producer
2021	"Life Is Good"	Future featuring Drake	Julien Christian Lutz, director; Harv Glazer, producer
2021	"Lockdown"	Anderson .Paak	Dave Meyers, director; Nathan Scherrer, producer
2022
2022	"Freedom"	Jon Batiste	Alan Ferguson, director; Alex P. Willson, producer
2022	"Good 4 U"	Olivia Rodrigo	Petra Collins, director; Christiana Divona, Marissa Ramirez and Tiffany Suh, producers
2022	"Happier Than Ever"	Billie Eilish	Billie Eilish, director; Michelle An, Chelsea Dodson and David Moore, producers
2022	"I Get a Kick Out of You"	Tony Bennett and Lady Gaga	Jennifer Lebeau, director; Danny Bennett, Bobby Campbell and Jennifer Lebeau, producers
2022	"Montero (Call Me by Your Name)"	Lil Nas X	Lil Nas X and Tanu Muino, directors; Frank Borin, Ivanna Borin, Marco De Molina and Saul Levitz, producers
2022	"Peaches"	Justin Bieber featuring Daniel Caesar and Giveon	Colin Tilley, director; Jamee Ranta and Jack Winter, producers
2022	"Shot in the Dark"	AC/DC	David Mallet, director; Dione Orrom, producer
2023
2023	All Too Well: The Short Film	Taylor Swift	Taylor Swift, director; Saul Germaine, producer
2023	"As It Was"	Harry Styles	Tanu Muino, director; Frank Borin, Ivanna Borin, Fred Bonham Carter, Bryan Younce and Alexa Haywood, producers
2023	"Easy on Me"	Adele	Xavier Dolan, director; Xavier Dolan, Jannie McInnes and Nancy Grant, producers
2023	"The Heart Part 5"	Kendrick Lamar	Dave Free and Kendrick Lamar, directors; Jason Baum and Jamie Rabineau, producers
2023	"Woman"	Doja Cat	Child., director; Missy Galanida, Sam Houston, Michelle Larkin and Isaac Rice, producers
2023	"Yet to Come"	BTS	Yong Seok Choi, director; Tiffany Suh, producer
2024
2024	"I'm Only Sleeping"	The Beatles^{[IV]}	Em Cooper, director; Jonathan Clyde, Sophie Hilton, Sue Loughlin and Laura Thomas, producers
2024	"Count Me Out"	Kendrick Lamar	Dave Free and Kendrick Lamar, directors; Jason Baum and Jamie Rabineau, producers
2024	"In Your Love"	Tyler Childers	Bryan Schlam, director; Kacie Barton, Silas House, Nicholas Robespierre, Ian Thornton and Whitney Wolanin, producers
2024	"Rush"	Troye Sivan	Gordon Von Steiner, director; Kelly McGee, producer
2024	"What Was I Made For?"	Billie Eilish	Billie Eilish, director; Michelle An, Chelsea Dodson and David Moore, producers
2025
2025	"Not Like Us"	Kendrick Lamar	Dave Free and Kendrick Lamar, directors; Jack Begert, Sam Canter and Jamie Rabineau, producers
2025	"360"	Charli XCX	Aidan Zamiri, director; Jami Arceo and Evan Thicke, producers
2025	"Fortnight"	Taylor Swift featuring Post Malone	Taylor Swift, director; Jil Hardin, producer
2025	"Houdini"	Eminem	Rich Lee, director; Kathy Angstadt, Lisa Arianna and Justin Diener, producers
2025	"Tailor Swif"	ASAP Rocky	Vania Heymann and Gal Muggia, directors; Natan Schottenfels, producer
2026
2026	"Anxiety"	Doechii	James Mackel, director; Pablo Feldman, Jolene Mendes and Sophia Sabella, producers
2026	"Love"	OK Go	Aaron Duffy, Miguel Espada and Damian Kulash Jr., directors; Petra Ahmann and Andrew Geller, producers
2026	"Manchild"	Sabrina Carpenter	Vania Heymann and Gal Muggia, directors; Aiden Magarian, Nathan Scherrer and Natan Schottenfels, producers
2026	"So Be It"	Clipse	Hannan Hussain, director; Theresa Kusumadjaja, producer
2026	"Young Lion"	Sade	Sophie Muller, director; Aaron Taylor Dean and Sade, producers
2027
2027	"Berghain"	Rosalía, Björk and Yves Tumor	Nicolas Mendez, video director; Alba Barneda and Maria Rubio, video producers
2027	"Click Clack Symphony"	Raye featuring Hans Zimmer	Dave Meyers, video director; Maggie Curwin, video producer
2027	"Hate That I Made You Love Me"	Ariana Grande	Christian Breslauer, video director; Mike Breslauer, Andrew Lerios and Luga Podesta, video producers
2027	"Lost Boys"	Phoebe Bridgers	Lance Oppenheim and Pablo Rochat, video directors; Pierre Moulène and Christian Vazquez, video producers
2027	"Storm"	Gener8ion and Yung Lean	Romain Gavras, video director; Nicolas Galoux, Guillaume Le Gat and Maeva Tenneroni, video producers

^{^[I]} Each year is linked to the article about the Grammy Awards held that year.
^{^[II]} Director(s) are only indicated if they were presented with a Grammy Award.
^{^[III]} Award was not presented. Music video categories presented this year included Best Concept Music Video and Best Performance Music Video.
^{^[IV]} Award was not presented to the performing artist.

== Artists, directors, and producers with multiple wins ==
3 wins

- Kendrick Lamar
- Mark Romanek
- Nathan Scherrer

2 wins

- The Beatles
- Beyoncé
- Johnny Cash
- Ceán Chaffin
- Mathew Cullen
- David Fincher
- Janet Jackson
- Michael Jackson
- Joseph Kahn
- Melina Matsoukas
- Dave Meyers
- Taylor Swift

== Artists, directors, and producers with multiple nominations ==
8 nominations

- Nathan Scherrer

6 nominations

- Mark Romanek

5 nominations

- Björk
- Georges Bermann
- Joseph Kahn
- Kendrick Lamar
- Michel Gondry
- Saul Levitz

4 nominations

- Candice Dragonas
- Candice Ouaknine
- Dave Free
- Dave Meyers
- Jason Baum
- Jay-Z
- Madonna
- Natan Schottenfels
- Tony Kaye

3 nominations

- Bart Lipton
- Chris Milk
- Coldplay
- Damian Kulash, Jr.
- David Fincher
- Jamie Rabineau
- Johnny Cash
- Jonathan Dayton
- Michael Jackson
- Missy Elliott
- OK Go
- Phil Collins
- Romain Gavras
- Roman Pichon Herrera
- Sinéad O'Connor
- Steve Lamar
- Trish Sie
- Taylor Swift
- Valerie Faris
- Woodkid

2 nominations

- Adele
- Aerosmith
- Andrew Lerios
- Aris McGarry
- The Beatles
- Beyoncé
- Billie Eilish
- Brandon Bonfiglio
- Bryan Younce
- Ceán Chaffin
- Chelsea Dodson
- Chris Robinson
- Colin Tilley
- Daniels
- David Moore
- Dawn Rose
- Dire Straits
- Eminem
- Erinn Williams
- F. Gary Gray
- Francis Lawrence
- Frank Borin
- Gal Muggia
- George Flanigen
- Gnarls Barkley
- Gorillaz
- Green Day
- Greg Tharp
- Ivanna Borin
- Jack Hardwicke
- Jack White
- Jake Scott
- Jamie Hewlett
- Janet Jackson
- Jason Cole
- Javier Jimenez
- Jennifer Heath
- Jim Yukich
- Julie Fong
- Juliette Larthe
- Kathleen Heffernan
- Lady Gaga
- Lil Nas X
- Luga Podesta
- Martina McBride
- MaryAnn Tanedo
- Mathew Cullen
- Melina Matsoukas
- Michelle An
- OutKast
- Patrick Daughters
- Paul Hunter
- Pete Candeland
- Peter Gabriel
- Pharrell Williams
- Rachel Curl
- Radiohead
- R.E.M.
- Rihanna
- Robert Deaton
- Ron Mohrhoff
- Shirley Moyers
- Spike Jonze
- Tanu Muino
- Tarsem
- Terry Fitzgerald
- Tiffany Suh
- Todd McFarlane
- Vania Heymann
- Vincent Landay
- "Weird Al" Yankovic

== See also ==
- Latin Grammy Award for Best Short Form Music Video
- List of Grammy Award categories
- List of most expensive music videos
- One shot (music video)
