= Grady Hall =

American director and screenwriter

- Occupation: Film Director
- Website: www.gradyhall.com

Grady Hall is an American director of commercials and music videos, as well as a screenwriter, producer, and director of one 2010 episode of the television series Spartacus: Blood and Sand.

He has directed music videos for Beck, Katy Perry, and Capital Cities, for which he received a Grammy nomination, and won an MTV Video Music Award.

== Career ==
Hall began his career working at Warner Bros. in syndicated television. He later became a development executive for television producer Douglas S. Cramer and was also a staff writer on The Outer Limits for SyFy, which filmed in Vancouver, British Columbia.

Hall was a founding director of the production company Motion Theory, which he helped build from a pure animation and design company into a live-action and visual effects studio. Filmmakers Guillermo del Toro and Guillermo Navarro co-founded Mirada as Motion Theory’s feature-film visual effects arm, with Hall taking a creative leadership role in the new company and simultaneously continuing to write and direct projects.

In 2010, Hall returned to TV, serving as a consulting producer for six episodes, and director of one episode, for the debut season of Sam Raimi's Spartacus: Blood and Sand starring Lucy Lawless and Andy Whitfield.

In 2013, Hall's music video for Capital Cities' “Safe and Sound” was nominated for the Grammy Award for Best Music Video, with co-creators Buddy Enright, Daniel Weisman and Danny Lockwood. The video was also nominated for two MTV Video Music Awards; Teri Whittaker for Art Direction; and winning for Best Visual Effects, awarded to co-editors Hall, Jonathan Wu and Derek Johnson. That same year, he also co-directed the music video for Katy Perry’s “Roar”, winner of the popular vote People’s Choice Award for Favorite Music Video.

Hall left Motion Theory and Mirada in 2014 to join Partizan Entertainment, home to directors such as Michel Gondry, Antoine Bardou-Jacquet, and Michael Gracey. There, he worked on campaigns for Amazon, Pepsi, and Microsoft – directing the global launch video for the HoloLens augmented-reality viewer.

== Select music video credits ==
- “The Science of Selling Yourself Short” by Less Than Jake (2003)
- “Animal” by R.E.M. (2004)
- “Take It Away” by The Used (2004)
- “Getting Away with Murder” by Papa Roach (2004)
- “Girl” by Beck (2005)
- “Scars” by Papa Roach (2005)
- “Dashboard” by Modest Mouse (2007)
- “Safe and Sound” by Capital Cities (2013)
- “Roar” by Katy Perry (2013)
- "Phoenix" by Olivia Holt (2016)
- "Wow" by Beck (2016)

== Awards ==
Year	Award	Category	Work	Result	Ref.
2013	Grammy Awards	Best Music Video	Capital Cities “Safe and Sound”	Nominated w/Buddy Enright, Daniel Weisman and Danny Lockwood	
2013	People's Choice Awards	Favorite Music Video	Katy Perry "Roar"	Won	
2013	MTV Video Music Awards	Best Visual Effects	Capital Cities “Safe and Sound”	Won w/ Jonathan Wu and Derek Johnson	
