= London Fields (film) =

2018 film by Mathew Cullen

- Theatrical release poster
- Directed by: Mathew Cullen
- Screenplay by: Roberta Hanley; Martin Amis
- Based on: London Fields by Martin Amis
- Produced by: Chris Hanley; Jordan Gertner; Geyer Kosinski
- Starring: Billy Bob Thornton; Amber Heard; Jim Sturgess; Theo James; Jason Isaacs; Cara Delevingne; Obi Abili; Jaimie Alexander
- Cinematography: Guillermo Navarro
- Edited by: Douglas Crise; Joe Plenys; Jamie Trevill; St. John O'Rorke
- Music by: Toydrum; Benson Taylor; Adam Barber
- Production companies: Hero Entertainment; PicturePro LLC; Gap Financing; Muse Productions; Media Talent Group; Mirada Studios; Demarest Films; Lipsync Productions; Head Gear Films; Blazepoint Limited; Curiously Bright Entertainment; Periscope Entertainment; Arrival Entertainment; Vedette Finance; Living the Dream Films
- Distributed by: GVN Releasing
- Release dates: 20 September 2018 (Russia); 26 October 2018 (United States)
- Running time: 102 minutes
- Countries: United Kingdom; United States
- Language: English
- Budget: $8 million
- Box office: $487,420

London Fields is a 2018 mystery thriller film directed by Mathew Cullen from a screenplay by Roberta Hanley and Martin Amis, based on the 1989 novel of the same name by Amis. The film stars Billy Bob Thornton as Samson Young, a terminally ill writer who has suffered from writer's block for 20 years. The cast also includes Amber Heard, Jim Sturgess, Theo James, Jason Isaacs, Cara Delevingne, Obi Abili, and Jaimie Alexander.

The film was selected to be screened in the Special Presentations section of the 2015 Toronto International Film Festival, but it was later pulled from the festival roster after director Mathew Cullen sued the film's producers, accusing them of fraud and using his name to promote a cut of the film he does not support. After the producers reached a settlement with Cullen in a separate lawsuit, London Fields was released theatrically in the United States on 26 October 2018, and was a critical and commercial failure.

== Plot ==
Nicola Six has clairvoyant powers and discovers that she will die at the hands of one man. She begins an affair with three men to discover which of them is the killer.

The story opens with Samson Young, a terminally ill American writer who has come to London, apartment-swap with fellow writer Mark Asprey. He is taken there by taxi driver Keith Talent, a crude slob who, despite not being very bright, excels at darts. After going to Mark's flat, Keith takes him to a pub called the Black Cross, where he meets Guy Clinch, the current head of his family's business empire, who is trapped in a loveless marriage with his wife Hope. Clinch has a disturbed son, who tries to destroy everything he can get his hands on, although he tries to be a good man, and is not crude, unlike Keith, but for some reason is his friend. Keith keeps borrowing money from Guy to pay off all the loan sharks he owes, including darts rival Chick Purchase. While at the pub, they meet Nicola Six, who has just arrived from a funeral. Keith starts flirting with her. Guy does not, but does try to be a gentleman. Samson is fascinated by her.

The next day in the park, Samson sees Nicola dump a few books in a bin. Samson picks them out and starts reading them; the books imply that Nicola has the power to see into the future, but can only see people's deaths. It tells that she knew how her parents, sister, and best friend were going to die. Samson takes them back to her flat and asks Nicola if she would be the central character of his novel. Nicola looks annoyed but agrees. Samson discovers that Nicola lives in the apartment above him and places recording devices between the cracks.

Nicola then plays the innocent, naïve woman with Guy, who is trying to help her find her friend, Enola Gay, in Burma and her friend's Little Boy. Guy becomes overprotective of her and eventually makes love to her. She lies about being a virgin to Guy, whilst also being the femme fatale with Keith. She tells Guy that she is teaching Keith to read, and tells Keith that it is all part of a con so that Keith can pay off his debt. She seduces and manipulates both of them by openly flirting with one in front of the other.

Samson emails his novel, The Murderee , to his publicists, Missy and Mark. Missy responds by email that she will not publish it because she believes it is about her. He receives a phone call from Mark saying he admires Samson's nerve.

Nicola, pretending to be from social services, visits Keith's flat, where she meets Keith's wife Kath and their daughter. Nicola mocks the way they live and threatens to turn their daughter over to child services. Later that night, Keith goes to Nicola's flat to threaten her, but she has the money to pay off Chick (who paid off the other loan sharks, so now Keith owes it all to him), which he does.

Nicola and Samson meet at a restaurant where Samson tells Nicola he thinks the reader will only ever see her as a male fantasy figure. Nicola then tells Samson she knows he is dying and begins to flirt with him. Samson initially rejects her, eventually giving in and making love.

At the darts world championship, Nicola rejects both Keith and Guy, kissing Chick in front of them. Samson finds photos in one of Mark's books showing his affair with Nicola, on Guy Fawkes Night. On Nicola's 30th birthday, it is revealed that Samson is the one to kill her. Although she knew she was going to die that night, she did not know who would kill her. She accepts her fate, and Samson kills her. He then takes her body back to Mark's flat and prints his novel. He renames it London Fields and leaves a note on top of the novel, before placing it on Nicola. He then lies next to her and dies.

The next morning, Mark returns home to find them dead. He picks up Samson's novel and starts reading it. He sells the novel under his own name, and it becomes a number-one bestseller. Keith and Kath watch him on television, annoyed.

== Cast ==
- Billy Bob Thornton as Samson Young
- Amber Heard as Nicola Six
- Jim Sturgess as Keith Talent
- Theo James as Guy Clinch
- Jason Isaacs as Mark Asprey
- Jaimie Alexander as Hope Clinch
- Cara Delevingne as Kath Talent
- Obi Abili as Thelonius
- Gemma Chan as Petronella
- Lily Cole as Trish Shirt
- Chris Wilson as Chauffeur Nicola Six

Johnny Depp has an uncredited cameo as Chick Purchase. His character is loosely based on darts legend Bobby George.

== Production ==
David Cronenberg was approached in 2001 to do a film adaptation of the book, and Amis wrote a draft of the script. However, Cronenberg left the film for A History of Violence and Eastern Promises. Other directors approached included David Mackenzie and Michael Winterbottom. The film entered production with Mathew Cullen in September 2013 in London.

== Soundtrack ==
The soundtrack was written and produced by Toydrum, Benson Taylor, and Adam Barber, and features music by Grinderman and London Grammar.

== Release ==
In September 2015, Lionsgate and Grindstone acquired distribution rights to the film with the intention of releasing it through Lionsgate Premiere. Although the film screened for press and industry at the 2015 Toronto International Film Festival, three scheduled screenings for the public were cancelled by the Festival because of a legal dispute between the director and producer.

London Fields was first released theatrically in Russia on 20 September 2018. The film was released in 600 theaters in the United States on 26 October 2018 by GVN Releasing, a small distributor which previously had focused on faith-based films. According to The Hollywood Reporter, "a select few theaters" in the United States played a cut of the film that was put together by director Mathew Cullen, but that version was not widely exhibited and was not the cut screened for critics.

=== Legal issues ===
In September 2015, the film was pulled from the Toronto International Film Festival, after Matthew Cullen filed a lawsuit against the film's producers, for fraud, failing to pay him, and taking away the final cut. The producers responded to the lawsuit stating:

The timing and the content of the director's lawsuit shows that it is a publicity stunt. The filing of Mathew Cullen's complaint violates the arbitration provisions of his own guild, the DGA. Sadly, Mathew can't deal with the fact that he does not control the final cut of the movie. He was given two deadlines to deliver a 'director's cut' and missed both deadlines. His guild has rules for withdrawing his name from the picture and he missed those deadlines. The production company will vigorously oppose the lawsuit.

In November 2015, the producers counterclaimed for breach of contract, saying they had terminated the director's formal editing rights period and notified the Directors Guild of America when the film was $2 million over budget and late for delivery. They accuse Cullen of violating both his agreement with them and DGA rules by working on a music video for Katy Perry during his time editing London Fields, and further that Cullen withheld promotional support and committed tortious interference by discouraging the film's stars from performing promotional and post-production services. In April 2016, a judge allowed the case to proceed.

In November 2016, a second lawsuit was filed by the producers suing Amber Heard for $10 million. The lawsuit claims Heard and Cullen made unauthorised changes to the film's script and failed to finish voice-over work. Heard countersued claiming the producers violated a nudity clause in her contract by filming scenes with a body double and digitally replacing the double's face with Heard's. In September 2018, the producers reached a settlement with Heard.

== Reception ==
=== Box office ===
On its opening weekend, the film grossed $168,575 in the United States from 613 theaters with a per-screen average of $261, becoming the second worst US box office opening for a wide release film of all time, behind Proud American (2008).

=== Critical response ===
On the review aggregator website Rotten Tomatoes, the film holds an approval rating of 0% based on 35 reviews, with an average rating of 2.7/10. The website's critics consensus reads, "London Fields bungles its beloved source material and an intriguingly eclectic cast, leaving audiences with a would-be neo-noir of interest only to the morbidly curious." Metacritic, which uses a weighted average, assigned the film a score of 16 out of 100, based on 12 critics, indicating "overwhelming dislike".

Peter Sobczynski of RogerEbert.com gave the film 0.5/4 and described it as a "boring and garish mess that even fans of the book will find nearly impossible to follow."

Jeannette Catsoulis from The New York Times called it "horrendous" and "a trashy, tortured misfire from beginning to end".

Andrew Barker of Variety wrote: "Despite lush photography and a cast attractive enough to lure curious distributors, this misbegotten mess risks suffering the same fate at the box office that befalls its heroine on her dead-end street, but Cullen genuinely deserves credit for making it this far — sometimes you have to try to adapt a seemingly unadaptable book just to learn how truly unadaptable it is."

Writing for The Independent, Kaleem Aftab rated the film one out of five stars, writing, "Most scenes lack pace, are performed badly and are accompanied by a running commentary of action we can see for ourselves. It's car-crash film-making. Of the characters, it's only the uncredited Depp, the coolest guy in the room, with his dapper dress sense and long sideburns, who comes away with any credit."

=== Accolades ===
Amber Heard was nominated in the Worst Actress category at the 39th Golden Raspberry Awards.

== See also ==
- List of films featuring drones
- List of films with a 0% rating on Rotten Tomatoes
