= Motion Theory =

American production company

The Motion Theory is
- Company type: Private Company
- Industry: Visual art, Television advertisement
- Founded: Venice, California (May 21, 2000)
- Founder: Mathew Cullen, Javier Jimenez
- Headquarters: Marina Del Rey, Los Angeles, California
- Products: Music Videos, Advertisement
- Number of employees: 50
- Website: http://www.motiontheory.com/

Motion Theory was an American production company founded on 1 May 2000 by Mathew Cullen and Javier Jimenez. The company was located in Marina Del Rey in Los Angeles, California, United States. The company produced hundreds of projects and was awarded multiple Grammys, MTV Video Music Awards and AICP Awards for its commercial and music video production work. Its director roster included Mathew Cullen, Bo Krabbe, Guillermo del Toro, Jesus de Francisco, Christopher Leone, Clement Oberto, Daniel Reisinger, Lucas Borras, Marlind & Stein, Chris Riehl, Vanessa Marzaroli and Syyn Labs. Motion Theory's notable work includes commercials for Audi, HP, IBM, Samsung, Nike, NFL; and music videos for Adele, Weezer, The Black Eyed Peas and Katy Perry. Motion Theory held the Guinness World Record for the most internet memes in a music video, 51 featured in Weezer's Pork and Beans. The video was directed by Cullen and produced by Javier Jimenez and Bernard Rahill.

== History ==
In August 2010 Motion Theory moved their company headquarters from Venice, CA to an expanded 25,000-square-foot (2,300 m^{2}) space in Marina del Rey in Los Angeles, CA.

On December 9, 2010, Guillermo del Toro, cinematographer Guillermo Navarro, Mathew Cullen and Javier Jimenez launched Mirada Studios, a sister company to Motion Theory. Mirada is a story development, digital production and visual effects company made up of animators, designers, digital artists, writers and filmmakers. The team works collaboratively to create and produce projects that span digital production and content for film, television, advertising, interactive and other media.

In January 2017 Motion Theory sought bankruptcy protection leaving numerous vendors and people unpaid.

== Awards ==
The motion theory award list:

Project	Field	Award	Year	Nominee or won
Buick: Behind the Beauty	Short-film	Bessie	2010	won
Tanqueray Resist Simple	Short-film	AICP SHORTLIST	2010	won
NFL Network Run	Commercial	Emmy	2010	won
Katy Perry: California Gurls	Music Video	MTV EMA (Europe)	2010	won
Katy Perry: California Gurls	Music Video	MTV VMA	2010	Nominee
The Black Eyed Peas: Boom Boom Pow	Music Video	Grammy: Best Music Video	2009	Won
HP: Fergie	Commercial	AICP	2009	Won
Weezer: Pork and Beans (song)	Music Video	Grammy: Best Music Video	2008	Won
Adele: Chasing Pavements	Music Video	MTV VMA	2008	Nominee
HP: Pharrell	Commercial	AICP	2007	Won
Microsoft Zune: Two Little Birds	Commercial	AIGA, SIGGRAPH	2007	Won
HP: Paulo Coelho	Commercial	SIGGRAPH	2007	Won
Reebok Wrapshear	Commercial	Silver Clio	2006	Won
Beck: "Girl"	Music Video	MVPA	2006	Won
Nike Presto 04	Commercial	AICP, ADC GOLD, D&AD	2004	Won
Nike Flow	Commercial	AICP	2004	Won
ESPN Evolution	Commercial	AICP	2003	Won
Direct TV ESPN Fullcourt	Commercial	AIGA	2003	Won

== See also ==
- Pixar
- DreamWorks SKG
- DreamWorks Animation
- Computer-generated imagery
- List of animation studios
- Stop-motion animation
