= Hostile Planet =

American documentary television series

- Genre: Nature documentary
- Narrated by: Bear Grylls
- Composers: Benjamin Wallfisch; Matías León
- No. of seasons: 1
- No. of episodes: 6

Production
- Running time: 47 minutes

Original release
- Network: National Geographic Channel
- Release: April 2019 – May 2019

Hostile Planet is an American documentary series that premiered on National Geographic on 1 April 2019. Directed by Guillermo Navarro with narration from Bear Grylls, the series draws attention to accounts of animals that have adapted to different environments.
