= Mathew Cullen =

American music video and film director

Mathew Cullen is an American music video, commercial, and film director. He is co-founder of Mirada Studios with Guillermo del Toro and co-founder of the production company Motion Theory.

== Career ==
Mathew Cullen grew up in Inglewood, California. He founded Los Angeles-based production company Motion Theory at 23. Since then, he has overseen the production of 500+ projects, and directed and produced over 100 commercials and music videos, including global campaigns for HP, IBM, Google, and Disney. He has worked with artists such as Adele, Jay-Z, Katy Perry, Green Day, Taylor Swift, Pink, Beck and R.E.M. Cullen won two consecutive Grammy Awards for directing The Black Eyed Peas' "Boom Boom Pow" and Weezer's "Pork and Beans", the most blogged-about YouTube video of 2008. His work on "Pork and Beans" earned him a Guinness World Record for most memes in a video. In 2014, Cullen reunited with Katy Perry to win Best Video at the MTV Europe Music Awards and Best Female Video at the MTV Video Music Awards for "Dark Horse", the most watched music video of the year with over two billion views. He also directed Katy Perry's "Chained to the Rhythm" featuring Skip Marley.

In 2013, he designed and directed the prologue to Guillermo del Toro's film Pacific Rim. In September 2013, he began directing the feature film London Fields, based on the novel by Martin Amis, starring Billy Bob Thornton, Amber Heard, Jim Sturgess, Theo James, Johnny Depp, Cara Delevingne, and Jaimie Alexander. The film was released in 2018 and is one of the few films to hold an approval rating of 0% on the website Rotten Tomatoes.

He teamed up with filmmaker Guillermo del Toro, Academy Award-winning cinematographer Guillermo Navarro, and executive producer Javier Jimenez to launch Mirada Studios, "a studio designed for storytellers" in 2010. Mirada is equal parts design studio, visual effects and animation facility, technology incubator, development and production company. Under his direction, Mirada has launched a number of multi-platform storytelling experiences, including the IBM THINK Exhibit installation at the Lincoln Center, the Ro.me interactive music video, and MirrorWorld, a living storybook app for author Cornelia Funke's book series.

Cullen currently serves on the board of directors for Film Independent.

== Recognition ==
Cullen was listed on Rolling Stone's annual "Hot List" for his work as a music video director, as well as IndieWire's 2013 Influencers List. Wired called him one of six directors who are making music videos cool again. Motion Theory was profiled in Fast Company as being one of the most innovative companies in the industry.
