= Nathan Scherrer =

American music video producer

- Born: September 24, 1988 (age 37); Northport, Michigan
- Occupation: Producer
- Notable work: Beyonce's Formation Video and music film Lemonade
- Awards: Grammy, Cannes Grand Prix, BET Video of the Year, Cannes Lion Broze
- Website: www.freenjoy.com

Nathan Scherrer, born 1988 in Northport, Michigan, is a Grammy Award–winning and nominated music video producer and the founder of the Los Angeles–based video production company Freenjoy. Through Freenjoy, Nathan Scherrer has produced music videos for a range of artists including The Weeknd, Kendrick Lamar, Pharrell Williams, Travis Scott, Beyonce, Nike, Harry Styles, and Ariana Grande.

== Early life ==
Nathan Scherrer graduated from the University of Michigan in 2011 and produced his first music video in 2013, entitled "Back to Me" for artist Joel Compass. The video, which won the 2014 Jury Award at the SXSW Film Festival in Austin, Texas, has surpassed half a million views on line. Following that first video, he produced Justin Timberlake's "Tunnel Vision".

== Highlighted producing credits ==
Year	Title	Position
2013	Justin Timberlake: Tunnel Vision	Producer
2015	Led Zeppelin: Brandy & Coke	Producer
2015	Rihanna: American Oxygen	Producer
2015	Diploe Presents: @Large - Creators at Work	Producer
2015	The Weekend: The Hills	Producer
2015	Big Sean Feat. Kanye West & John Legend: One Man Can Change the World	Producer
2015	Skrillex, Diplo, Justin Bieber: Where Are Ü Now	Producer
2016	Coldplay: Up&Up	Producer
2016	Tove Lo: Fairy Dust	Producer
2016	Pharrell: Freedom	Producer
2016	Beyonce: Formation	Producer
2016	Beyonce: Lemonade	Producer
2017	Kendrick Lamar: Humble	Producer
2018	Ariana Grande: no tears left to cry	Producer
2018	Ariana Grande Feat. Nicki Minaj: the light is coming	Producer
2018	Ariana Grande: God is a woman	Producer
2019	Taylor Swift: ME!	Producer
2020	Arizona Zervas: ROXANNE	Producer
2020	Ariana Grande: Positions	Producer
