= Mirada Studios =

- Founded: December 9, 2010
- Headquarters: Los Angeles, California, United States
- Key people: Guillermo del Toro (former partner); Mathew Cullen (Chief Creative Officer); Guillermo Navarro (former partner); Javier Jimenez (former partner & executive producer)
- Parent: Trailer Park
- Website: Mirada.com

Mirada Studios is an American multiplatform storytelling company in Los Angeles, California, formed by directors Guillermo del Toro and Mathew Cullen, cinematographer Guillermo Navarro, and executive producer Javier Jimenez, to spearhead a new creative production model that integrates classic narrative tradition, and the art of storytelling, with emerging technologies.

Launched on December 9, 2010, the studio supports all facets of the story crafting process, with full concept, story development, design and 3D animation departments, a live-action division, post-production, digital/software and web development pipelines.

The company was merged out in 2013 by Motion Theory Inc. when partners del Toro and Navarro divested.

In 2016, the company moved from its Marina del Rey headquarters to be housed in the same building as Trailer Park and began operations as a "sister company". While a formal business relationship cannot be found, Trailer Park lists Mirada's portfolio on their website.
