= Guillermo Navarro =

Mexican cinematographer and director

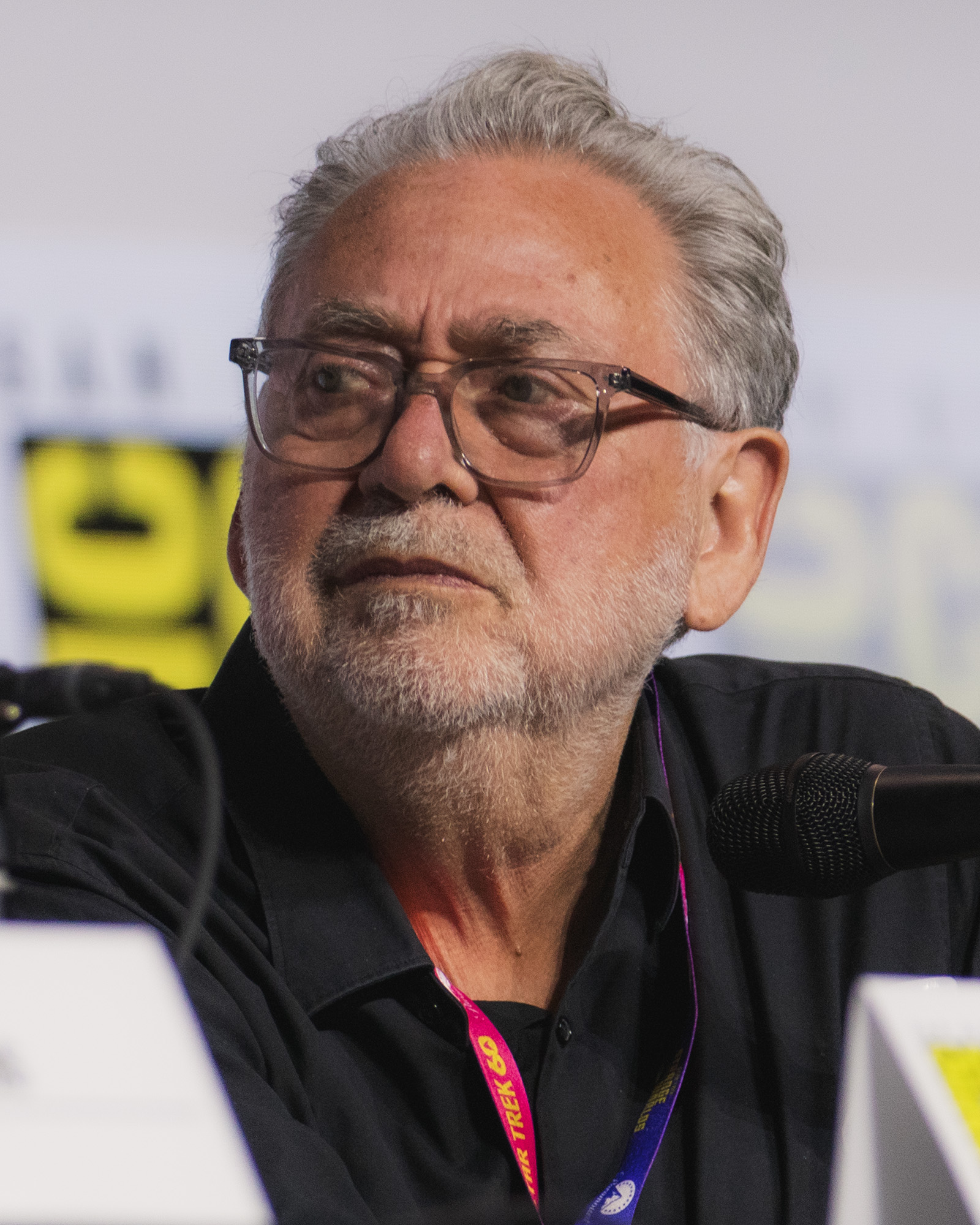
- Navarro in 2026
- Born: Guillermo Jorge Navarro Solares; July 29, 1955 (age 71); Mexico City, Mexico
- Education: National Autonomous University of Mexico
- Occupations: Cinematographer, television director
- Years active: 1973–2021 (Cinematography); 2012–present (Director)
- Website: guillermonavarrodp.com

Guillermo Jorge Navarro Solares, AMC, ASC (born July 29, 1955) is a Mexican cinematographer and television director.

He had been a frequent collaborator of Robert Rodriguez and Guillermo del Toro, with his work on Pan's Labyrinth earning him the Academy Award for Best Cinematography.

After making his first directorial effort with a music video for Mia Maestro titled "Blue Eyed Sailor", Navarro then shifted to a career as a TV director of series like Hannibal and Luke Cage, and was an executive producer on the National Geographic documentary series Hostile Planet, for which he earned his first Primetime Emmy nomination.

== Early life and education ==
Navarro was born in 1955 in Mexico City.

He began taking still photographs at age 13 when he took a photography workshop in middle school, and built his own darkroom. He then worked for several years as a freelance photographer, working on everything from album covers to fashion photography. He attended the National Autonomous University of Mexico, where he graduated with a degree in Sociology.

== Career ==
Navarro began working in the film industry when his sister, a producer, hired him as on-set still and continuity photographer for one of her films. The experience triggered an interest in cinematography, and he began working as a camera assistant. Rather than working his way up through the Mexican film industry the traditional way, he instead moved to Paris where he became the apprentice of cinematographer Ricardo Aronovich. He worked for around 10 years before shooting his first feature.

=== Film ===
Navarro quickly formed a partnership with filmmaker Guillermo del Toro, first by shooting commercials then later his directorial debut Cronos, which won the prestigious Golden Ariel. Navarro moved to the United States in 1994, where he shot several films for director Robert Rodriguez and worked with high-profile directors Renny Harlin and Quentin Tarantino. He returned to Mexico in 2001 to shoot del Toro's The Devil's Backbone.

=== Television ===
Navarro began working as a director in 2013 with an episode of Hannibal. He has subsequently directed episodes for shows like The Bridge, Narcos, Preacher, and Luke Cage.

In 2019, Navarro worked as an executive producer on the National Geographic documentary series Hostile Planet, earning him an nomination for a Primetime Emmy Award for Outstanding Documentary or Nonfiction Series.

== Style ==
His work often features very vivid blues and yellows which often take up most of the image, and the film's grain structure often switches between well-defined and sharp, and somewhat smoothed over or very fine.

In Pan's Labyrinth, Navarro and Del Toro had to work with a largely unfamiliar Spanish crew due to their usual crew's unavailability. Navarro shot the film using his personal Moviecam Compact and Arriflex 435 ES cameras and Zeiss Ultra Prime and Variable Prime lenses. He used three different Kodak film stocks: Vision2 200T 5217, Vision2 500T 5218, and Vision 250D 5246, depending on the lighting conditions under which a scene was filmed. Much of the film was shot using day for night, underexposing the film three or four F stops. He purposefully kept lighting effects that could only be attained with sunlight, which jarred the image when it passed itself as night, creating an aura of experimentation. Because of the awkwardly-shaped spaces of the fantasy sets, Navarro had to be creative with his lighting, finding places to put his lamps that also didn't disrupt the image. A lot of light was strictly attained by bouncing it into the set. For certain scenes, the crew also drilled tiny holes into the walls of the set and placed little lights into the spaces.

== Filmography ==
=== Cinematographer ===
Feature film

Year	Title	Director
1986	Amor a la vuelta de la esquina	Alberto Cortés
1990	Morir en el golfo	Alejandro Pelayo
1991	Cabeza de Vaca	Nicolás Echevarría
1991	Intimidades de un cuarto de baño	Jaime Humberto Hermosillo
1992	Cronos	Guillermo del Toro
1992	Vinaya	Josse De Pauw; Peter van Kraaij
1993	Dollar Mambo	Paul Leduc
1995	Desperado	Robert Rodriguez
1996	From Dusk till Dawn	Robert Rodriguez
1996	Dream for an Insomniac	Tiffanie DeBartolo
1996	The Long Kiss Goodnight	Renny Harlin
1997	Spawn	Mark A.Z. Dippé
1997	Jackie Brown	Quentin Tarantino
1999	Stuart Little	Rob Minkoff
2001	Spy Kids	Robert Rodriguez
2001	The Devil's Backbone	Guillermo del Toro
2001	Broken Silence	Montxo Armendáriz
2003	Imagining Argentina	Christopher Hampton
2004	Hellboy	Guillermo del Toro
2005	Zathura: A Space Adventure	Jon Favreau
2006	Pan's Labyrinth	Guillermo del Toro
2006	Night at the Museum	Shawn Levy
2008	Hellboy II: The Golden Army	Guillermo del Toro
2011	The Resident	Antti Jokinen
2011	I Am Number Four	D. J. Caruso
2011	The Twilight Saga: Breaking Dawn – Part 1	Bill Condon
2012	The Twilight Saga: Breaking Dawn – Part 2	Bill Condon
2013	Pacific Rim	Guillermo del Toro
2014	Night at the Museum: Secret of the Tomb	Shawn Levy
2018	London Fields	Mathew Cullen
2020	Dolittle	Stephen Gaghan
2021	The Unforgivable	Nora Fingscheidt

Television

Year	Title	Director	Notes
1989	Trying Times	Michael Lindsay-Hogg	Episode "The Hit List"
1993	The Cover Girl Murders	James A. Contner	TV movie
1994	The Cisco Kid	Luis Valdez	TV movie
1994	ABC Afterschool Special	Lorna Davis	Episode "Just Chill"
2012	Mockingbird Lane	Bryan Fuller	TV special
2017	Star Trek: Discovery	David Semel	Episode "The Vulcan Hello"
2018	Cocaine Godmother	Himself	TV movie
2019	Godfather of Harlem	John Ridley	Episode "By Whatever Means Necessary"

Music video

Year	Title	Artist
2016	"Fade"	Kanye West
2016	"My Way"	Calvin Harris

=== Director ===
Short film

- Blue Eyed Sailor (2012) (Also producer)

Television

Year	Title	Notes
2013-15	Hannibal	6 episodes
2014	The Bridge	Episode "Rakshasa"
2015	The Whispers	Episode "Meltdown"
2015	Narcos	Episodes "The Men of Always" and "The Palace in Flames"
2015	Limitless	Episode "The Legend of Marcos Ramos"
2015	Sleepy Hollow	Episode "The Sisters Mills"
2016	Damien	Episode "The Deliverer"
2016	Preacher	Episode "Sundowner"
2016	Luke Cage	Episode "Who's Gonna Take the Weight?"
2018	Cocaine Godmother	TV movie
2019-25	Godfather of Harlem	11 episodes
2020	For Life	Episodes "Witness" and "Burner"
2022	Guillermo del Toro's Cabinet of Curiosities	Episode "Lot 36"
2024	Hotel Cocaine	4 episodes

Music video

Year	Title	Artist
2012	"Blue Eyed Sailor"	Mía Maestro

== Awards and nominations ==
Year	Award	Category	Title	Result
2006	Academy Awards	Best Cinematography	Pan's Labyrinth	Won
2006	Boston Society of Film Critics	Best Cinematography	Pan's Labyrinth	Won
2006	Camerimage	Golden Frog	Pan's Labyrinth	Won
2006	Florida Film Critics Circle	Best Cinematography	Pan's Labyrinth	Won
2006	Goya Awards	Best Cinematography	Pan's Labyrinth	Won
2006	Independent Spirit Awards	Best Cinematography	Pan's Labyrinth	Won
2006	New York Film Critics Circle	Best Cinematographer	Pan's Labyrinth	Won
2006	Ariel Award	Best Cinematography	Pan's Labyrinth	Won
2006	BAFTA Awards	Best Cinematography	Pan's Labyrinth	Nominated
2006	British Society of Cinematographers	Best Cinematography	Pan's Labyrinth	Nominated
2008	Satellite Awards	Best Cinematography	It Might Get Loud	Nominated
2019	Primetime Emmy Awards	Outstanding Documentary Series	Hostile Planet	Nominated
