= Quintessence Films =

- Industry: Film production
- Founded: 2006; 19 years ago
- Founders: Michele Civetta; Manu Gargi
- Headquarters: New York City, New York, United States
- Website: quintessencefilms.com

Quintessence Films is a limited film production company specializing in music videos and commercials. Founded by Michele Civetta and Manu Gargi in 2006, it now has expanded to include directors Larry Clark, James Franco, and Tommy O'Haver.

The company has produced Friendly Fire, the DVD musical film companion to the 2006 Sean Lennon album of the same title, a commercial for the French water company Badoit, and a music video for Grand National. In 2009 Quintessence Films commissioned and produced a series of short films based on dreams in affiliation with 42 Below and the Beijing Film Studios. Filmmakers who created films are Asia Argento, Michele Civetta, James Franco, Lola Schnabel, Jonathan Caouette, Yung Chang and Sean Lennon.

In 2009, the company will produce a feature adaptation of Coin Locker Babies, directed by Civetta, as a co-production between French Studio Wild Bunch and Don Murphy's Angry Films.
