= Friendly Fire (Sean Lennon album) =

Studio album by Sean Lennon
- Released: 2 October 2006
- Recorded: Beerwinef*sh, Jim Henson Studios, Sound Factory and Sunset Sound
- Genre: Alternative rock
- Length: 37:44
- Labels: Parlophone, Capitol, EMI
- Producer: Sean Lennon

Sean Lennon chronology
Half Horse, Half Musician (1999)	Friendly Fire (2006)	Asterisms (2024)

Friendly Fire is the second studio album by Sean Lennon, released on 2 October 2006 by Capitol Records in the US, and Parlophone in the UK. It reached No. 152 on the US Billboard 200 chart and No. 5 in the Top Heatseekers chart. It stayed on the French album chart for 43 weeks and was certified silver.

== Background ==
The inspiration behind most of the songs on Friendly Fire was Lennon's tumultuous relationship with actress Bijou Phillips. According to Lennon, Phillips cheated on him with his childhood best friend, Max LeRoy; LeRoy died shortly afterwards in a motorcycle accident, before he and Lennon were able to resolve their differences.

Professional ratings
Review scores
Source	Rating
AllMusic	link
Being There Magazine	link
Mojo	4/5 stars
The Music Box	link
musicOMH	3/5 stars
Pitchfork Media	6.7/10 link
Q	(#244, Nov. 2006, p. 143)
Rolling Stone	9/26/06
Spin	link
Uncut	(#114, Nov. 2006, p.117)

== Visuals ==
The album was turned into a film, directed by Michele Civetta and written by Lennon and Civetta. The film stars Lennon, Bijou Phillips, Lindsay Lohan, Devon Aoki, Asia Argento, Jordana Brewster, Carrie Fisher and Harper Simon. Produced by Manu Gargi and Griffin Marcus for Quintessence Films, the story follows Lennon's discovery of Philips' alleged affair throughout a series of music videos. Throughout the film, many different scene settings were used. Scenes set in a circus, in a movie theater, at a fair, and during a Victorian sword fight. The scenes are connected with an overlying setting that represents Lennon's home, where we see Lennon creating art, writing, and eventually, mourn the loss of his relationship with Phillips. Lennon's mother Yoko Ono shared executive production credits with Lennon for the film.

== Track listing ==
All songs written by Sean Lennon, except where noted.

1. "Dead Meat" - 3:37
2. "Wait for Me" - 2:39
3. "Parachute" - 3:19
4. "Friendly Fire" - 5:03
5. "Spectacle" (Lennon, Jordan Galland) - 5:24
6. "Tomorrow" - 2:03
7. "On Again Off Again" - 3:18
8. "Headlights" - 3:16
9. "Would I Be the One" (Marc Bolan) - 4:58
10. "Falling Out of Love" (Lennon, Galland) - 4:07

French 2007 reissue bonus track

11. "L'éclipse" (Duet with -M-, French version of "Parachute") (Lennon, -M-) - 3:16

Bonus DVD

1. "Dead Meat"
2. "Parachute"
3. "Spectacle"
4. "Headlights"
5. "Friendly Fire"
6. "Wait for Me"
7. "On Again Off Again"
8. "Tomorrow"
9. "Would I Be the One"
10. "Falling Out of Love"

== Personnel ==
- Sean Lennon - vocals, guitar, bass guitar, keyboards, drums
- Harper Simon - guitar
- Yuka Honda - bass guitar, keyboards
- Jon Brion - guitar, Hammond organ, bass guitar, drums
- Greg Kurstin - Hammond organ
- Sebastian Steinberg - bass guitar
- Jim Keltner, Matt Chamberlain - drums
- Athena Legend, Bijou Phillips - backing vocals
- Sean Lennon, Eric Gorfain - string arrangements

== Chart positions ==
Chart	Position
French SNEP Albums Chart	59
U.S. Billboard 200	152

== Certifications ==
Region	Certification	Certified units/sales
France (SNEP)	Silver	35,000^{*}
^{*} Sales figures based on certification alone.

== Release details ==
Country	Date	Label	Format	Catalog
Japan	29 September 2006	Toshiba-EMI	CD/DVD	TOCP-66630 / 4988006846982
United Kingdom	2 October 2006	Parlophone	CD/DVD	3719492 / 0946 3 71949 2 8
United States	3 October 2006	Capitol Records	CD/DVD	7243 5 35568 2 2
