= Irina Lăzăreanu =

Canadian model (born 1982)

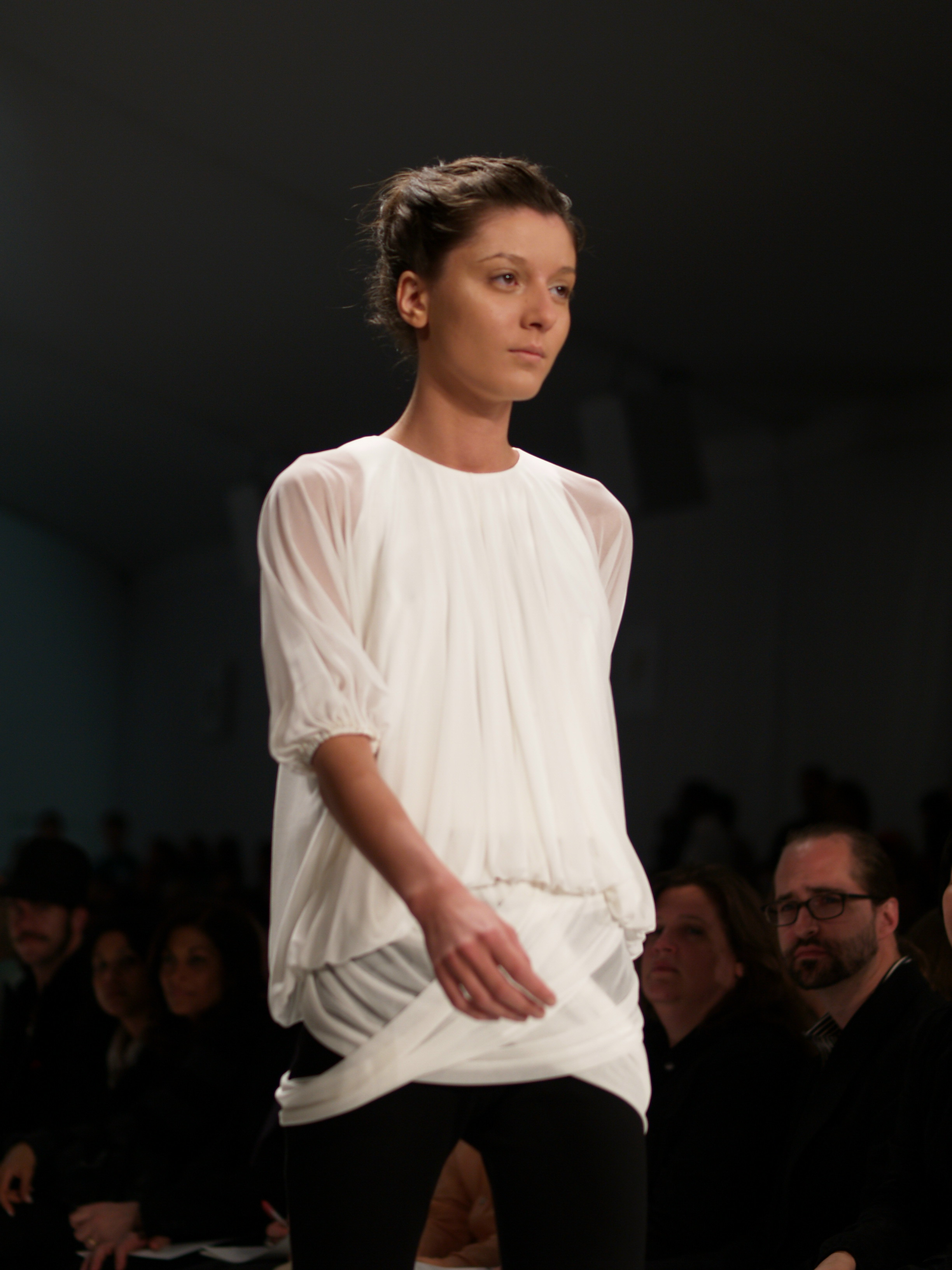
- Lăzăreanu in 2006
- Born: 8 June 1982 (age 44); Cluj-Napoca, Romania
- Modeling information
- Height: 1.77 m (5 ft 9 1/2 in)
- Hair color: Brown
- Eye color: Brown
- Agency: Elite Model Management (Paris, London); Why Not Model Management (Milan); IMM Bruxelles (Brussels); UNIQUE DENMARK (Copenhagen); Two Management (Los Angeles, Toronto); Chadwick Models (Sydney); Donna Models (Tokyo)

Irina Lăzăreanu (Romanian: [iˈrina ləzəˈre̯anu]; born 8 June 1982) is a Canadian model and folk singer. She has been an ambassador for Chanel and a muse to designers Karl Lagerfeld and Nicolas Ghesquière. As a musician, she is closely associated with Pete Doherty. Her debut album Some Place Along the Way was produced by Sean Lennon.

== Early life ==
Lăzăreanu was born in Cluj-Napoca, Romania, and at age five immigrated to Canada, settling into the Montreal suburb of Saint-Hubert, Quebec with her parents. At the age of 13, she moved to London to study ballet until she was derailed by a broken knee. At the age of 15 she met musician Pete Doherty, whom she later dated briefly and was engaged to in 2007.

== Modeling career ==
At age 17, Lăzăreanu attended an open call and signed with Giovanni modelling agency in Montreal with the hope that it would help pay rent. From then on she did the usual rounds of London and Paris, occasionally appearing in Barcelona, Australia and Madrid fashion weeks. She was chosen by acquaintance Kate Moss to model for the December/January 2005/2006 issue of Vogue: Paris, which Moss guest edited. Immediately after, she also appeared on the cover of Vogue Italia's January 2006 issue, photographed by Steven Meisel. In March 2007, Lăzăreanu was chosen by Kate Moss as the model for her new Topshop clothing range.

She has shot campaigns for many designers and brands, including Chanel (which she served as a brand ambassador for), Balenciaga, Alexander McQueen, Anna Sui, Lanvin, Versace, The Kooples, Gap and many more. She is affiliated with the modeling agencies The Society Management in New York City, Elite Model Management in Paris, Why Not Models in Milan, and Select Model Management in London. She has appeared covers of magazines such as W, Harpers Bazaar, Elle, Marie Claire and Nylon.

Lăzăreanu is also a designer with a successful fashion line in Japan in 2010, and a capsule collection for the Simons department store in Canada in 2015. Both lines sold out within weeks.

Having styled many of the shoots she modeled at, since 2018 she has concentrated on styling campaigns and been guest Art Director for several publications. Nowadays she focuses on styling and on her philanthropic work as co-creator of the charity No More Plastic, which is dedicated to reducing the harmful effects of plastic pollution.

== Personal style ==
Lăzăreanu is known for her quirky, vintage-inspired style – which has arguably contributed to the rise of her modelling career. When asked about her style, Lăzăreanu says: "I’m very influenced by the whole 1960s–1970s London era, not only in terms of my clothes but also in terms of the music I listen to, the movies I watch, the writers I read. Those influences probably translates into my personal style in an unconscious way."

Lăzăreanu is often described as having a distinctive look, as Emmanuelle Alt of Vogue Paris adds; "On the runway, no matter what, she cannot be transformed. She always has her unique look and style." As a result of her striking features and rock'n'roll semblance, Lăzăreanu has developed the status of 'official muse' to designers Nicolas Ghesquière and Karl Lagerfeld, with whom she shot the Chanel Cruise campaign.

== Music career ==
Lăzăreanu met musician Pete Doherty, then a member of the Libertines, at a party in Shepherd's Bush while she was a ballet student. Doherty and Lăzăreanu bonded over their shared interest in artists such as Oscar Wilde and Nina Simone. Lăzăreanu became closely involved with Doherty's band Babyshambles and toured with them in 2004, although she has denied the widespread rumor that she served as their drummer. Lăzăreanu co-wrote the song "La Belle et la Bête" which featured Kate Moss on the Babyshambles' Down in Albion album.

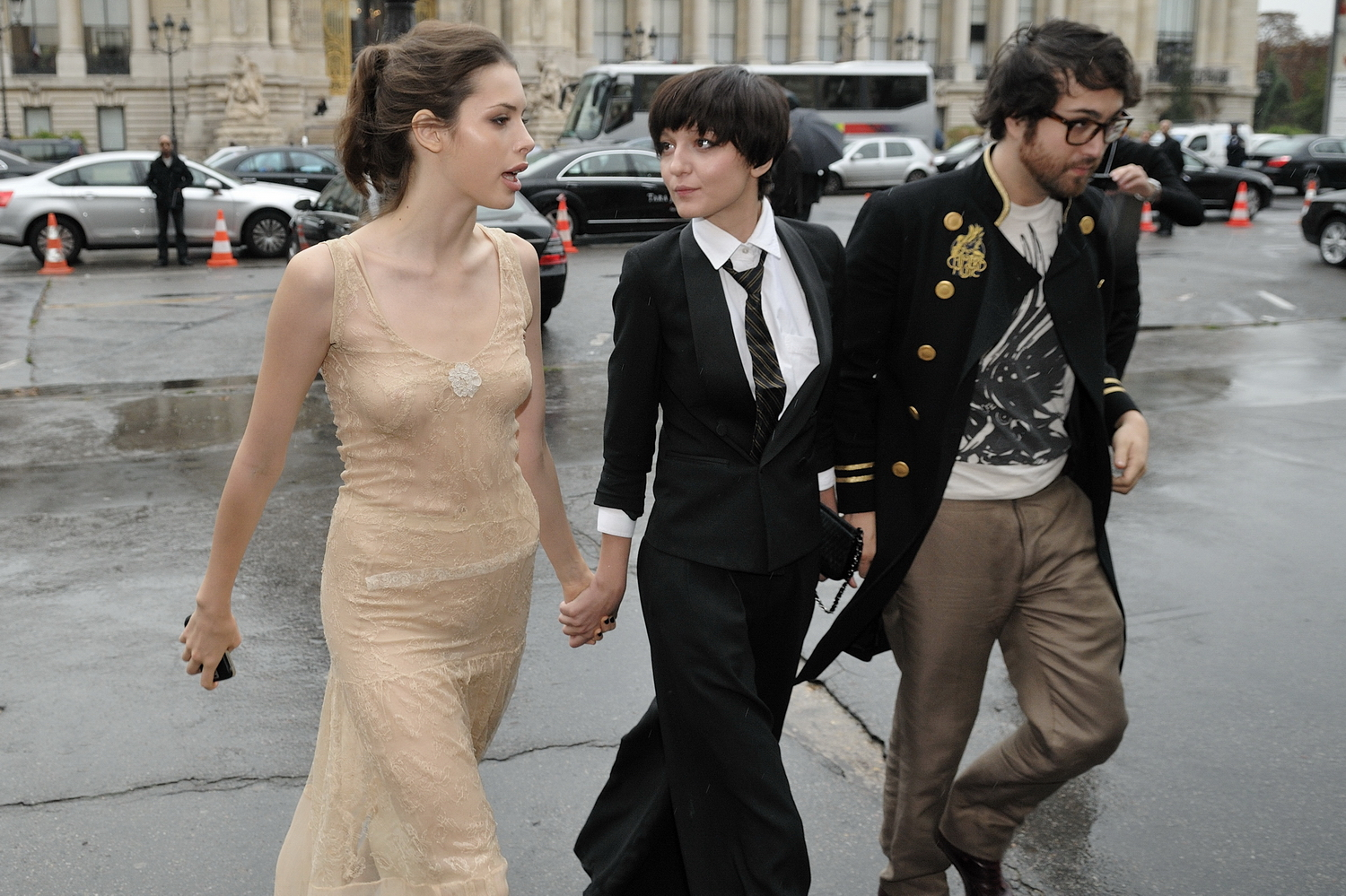
Lăzăreanu (centre) with Kemp Muhl and Sean Lennon in Paris, 6 October 2009

She recorded a folk album, entitled Some Place Along the Way, which musician Sean Lennon produced and collaborated on. It was to be released in late 2006 but was delayed until 2010. Lăzăreanu has said that "My music isn't commercial ... I just want to learn from people and do the best I can do" and cites Bob Dylan, Neil Young, Leonard Cohen and Joan Baez as her musical influences. In February 2007 Lăzăreanu announced that she would collaborate with Sean Lennon and Pete Doherty on a cover of Bob Dylan's "Girl from the North Country". In December 2007, during a special presentation for Chanel in London, Lăzăreanu debuted four songs off her album, which acted as the soundtrack to the show. Sean Lennon accompanied her on guitar.

In June 2010 Lăzăreanu organized a benefit concert in New York City and was set to perform with Doherty, Lennon, Charlotte Kemp Muhl, and Adam Green. Doherty was, however, refused entry into the United States – despite having a visa. The band played without him. In 2014, Lăzăreanu performed again with Mark Ronson and with Josephine de la Baume, at Paris Fashion Week. Since then, she has performed as a musical guest or as a DJ for Fashion Week parties, launches and at several music festivals including Coachella, South by Southwest and at Cannes Film Festival

== Author ==
In 2022 her book, Runway Bird, was published by Flammarion.

== Personal life ==
Lăzăreanu has twice been briefly engaged to musician Pete Doherty, first for a period in 2004 following the break-up of his band the Libertines and then for the second time in October 2007.
