= Midnight Sun (The Ghost of a Saber Tooth Tiger album) =

Studio album by the Ghost of a Saber Tooth Tiger
- Released: April 29, 2014
- Genre: Psychedelic pop
- Label: Chimera Music

The Ghost of a Saber Tooth Tiger chronology
La Carotte Bleue (2011)	Midnight Sun (2014)

Midnight Sun is the second album by the Ghost of a Saber Tooth Tiger. The album was recorded on a farm belonging to Sean Lennon and Charlotte Kemp Muhl.

== Reception ==
Professional ratings
Aggregate scores
Source	Rating
Metacritic	82/100
Review scores
Source	Rating
AllMusic	4/5 stars
The Independent	4/5 stars
The Line of Best Fit	8/10
Mojo	4/5 stars
NME	8/10
PopMatters	8/10
Record Collector	4/5 stars
Rolling Stone	3.5/5 stars
Under the Radar	8/10
The 405	7/10

According to the review aggregator Metacritic, Midnight Sun received "universal acclaim" based on a weighted average score of 82 out of 100 from 12 critic scores. Will Hermes of Rolling Stone gave the album three and a half stars and said "This is a rock record, no apologies." Al Horner of NME gave it four stars PopMatters described it as "practically dripping of the hippy, dippy late '60s" and called it "a near perfect album."

== Track listing ==
1. "Too Deep"
2. "Xanadu"
3. "Animals"
4. "Johannesburg"
5. "Midnight Sun"
6. "Last Call"
7. "Devil You Know"
8. "Golden Earring"
9. "Great Expectations"
10. "Poor Paul Getty"
11. "Don't Look Back Orpheus"
12. "Moth to a Flame"
