= Civetta =

Civetta is Italian for "little owl" (Athene noctua). It may also refer to:

== Names ==
- Il Civetta, alias of Flemish Northern Renaissance and Mannerist landscape painter Herri met de Bles (c. 1490 – 1566)
- Michele Civetta (born 1976), Italian film director
- Nick Civetta (born 1989), American rugby player
- Santiago Civetta (born 1998), Uruguayan rugby player

== Other ==
- Civetta (contrada), one of the 17 contrade districts of Siena, Italy
- Civettictis civetta, a large viverrid native to sub-Saharan Africa
- Monte Civetta, major mountain of the Dolomites in northern Italy
- Civetta, a fictional car brand based on Ferrari, appears in the videogame BeamNG.drive
