= The Claypool Lennon Delirium =

American rock band

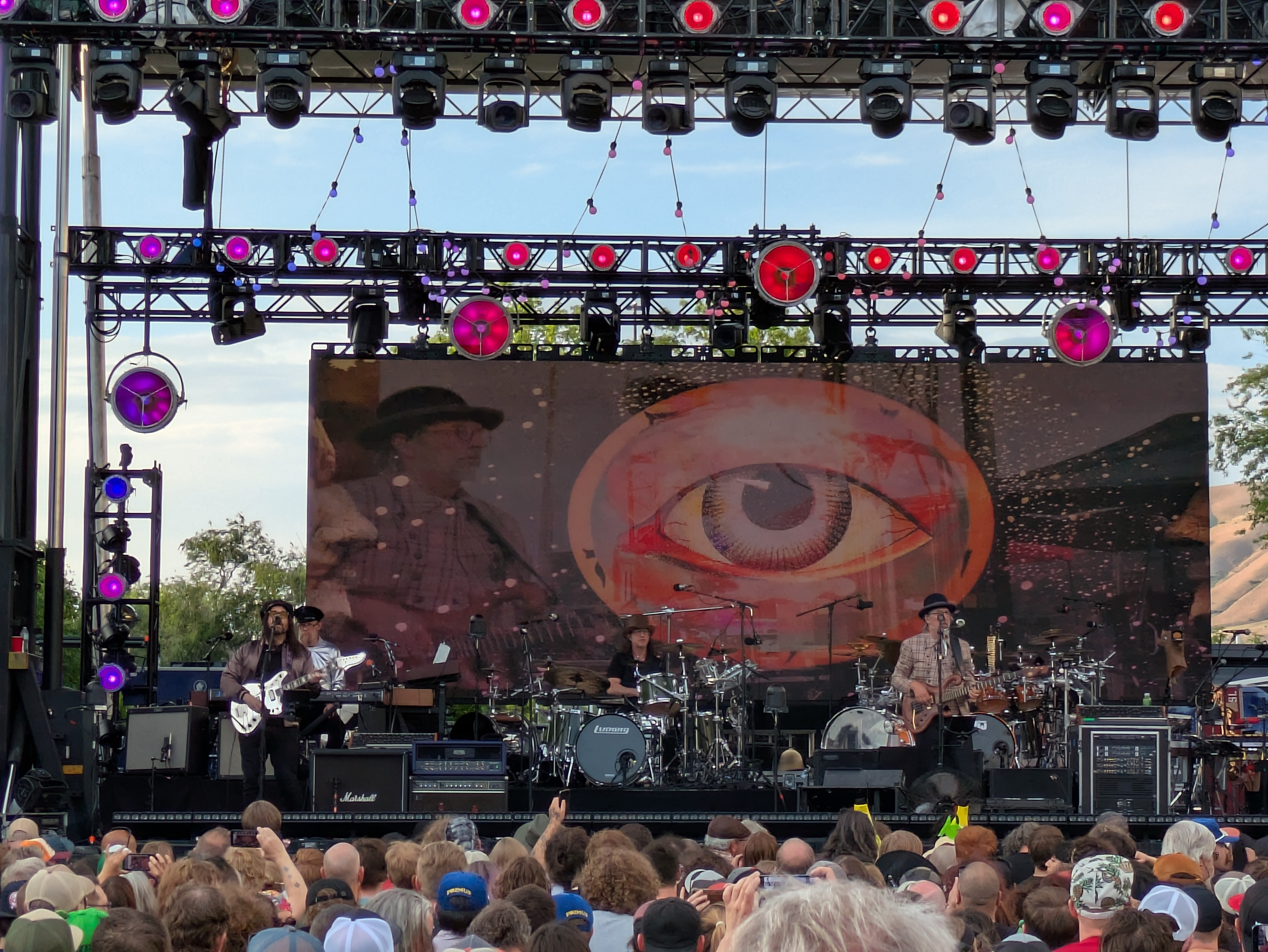
- Claypool Lennon Delirium on the Claypool Gold tour in Salt Lake City 2026 with Harry Waters on Keyboards.

Background information
- Origin: U.S.
- Genres: Psychedelic rock; progressive rock
- Years active: 2015–present
- Labels: ATO; Prawn Song; Chimera
- Spinoff of: Primus; The Ghost of a Saber Tooth Tiger
- Members: Les Claypool; Sean Ono Lennon; João Nogueira; Paulo Baldi
- Website: theclaypoollennondelirium.com

The Claypool Lennon Delirium is an American rock band, composed of bassist/vocalist Les Claypool, known for his work in Primus, guitarist/vocalist Sean Ono Lennon from The Ghost of a Saber Tooth Tiger, keyboardist/vocalist João Nogueira from Stone Giant (and later Mastodon), and drummer Paulo Baldi of Cake. Lennon classified the group's music as "progadelic".

== History ==
The band was conceived in 2015, with Claypool knowing that Primus would take a year off after touring alongside The Ghost of a Saber Tooth Tiger and Dinosaur Jr. He kept in touch with The Ghost of a Saber Tooth Tiger's lead singer Sean Ono Lennon, who had not planned any musical project for the following year.

They had ideas of making an old-school, psychedelic, and progressive rock record. Claypool invited Lennon to his guesthouse to drink wine, run some ideas, and play drums.

Over the course of six weeks, they wrote and recorded ten songs with both of them sharing various vocal and instrumental responsibilities, going beyond their core instruments of bass and guitar, and culminating in the release of their first studio album, Monolith of Phobos. The album debuted in the Top 10 of three Billboard charts: Top Vinyl Albums, Top Tastemakers Albums, and Top Alternative Albums.

On February 22, 2019, the duo released their second studio album, South of Reality. The LP was written and recorded over two months at Claypool's home recording studio in California and was preceded by the release of the six-and-a-half-minute track "Blood and Rockets". The duo embarked on a brief headlining tour in support of the record in late 2018, with successive dates in the spring of 2019.

In a May 2023 interview, Claypool indicated another album is being recorded. The bassist stated: "I'm half way through a Delirium record with Shiner...".

On February 25, 2026, the band announced their third full-length album, The Great Parrot-Ox and the Golden Egg of Empathy, which was released on May 1. The announcement was followed by a single, "The Golden Egg of Empathy" featuring Willow.

== Discography ==
=== Studio albums ===
- Monolith of Phobos (2016)
- South of Reality (2019)
- The Great Parrot-Ox and the Golden Egg of Empathy (2026)

=== EPs ===
- Lime and Limpid Green (2017)
- Melody of Entropy (2026)

=== Singles ===
- "Cricket and the Genie" (2016)
- "Blood and Rockets" b/w "Easily Charmed by Fools" (2018)
- "WAP (What a Predicament)" (2026)
- "The Golden Egg of Empathy" featuring Willow (2026)
- "Meat Machines" (2026)
