= Islands (2011 film) =

- Film poster
- Italian: Isole
- Directed by: Stefano Chiantini
- Written by: Stefano Chiantini
- Produced by: Sada Selvaggia
- Starring: Asia Argento; Giorgio Colangeli; Ivan Franek
- Cinematography: Vladan Radovic
- Edited by: Luca Benedetti
- Music by: Piernicola Di Muro
- Distributed by: Ellipsis Media International, Italy
- Release date: 14 September 2011 (TIFF)
- Running time: 92 minutes
- Country: Italy
- Language: Italian

Islands (Italian: Isole) is an Italian drama film released in 2011, directed by Stefano Chiantini and starring Asia Argento.

The film was presented in world première at the Toronto International Film Festival 2011, then at the Festival de Cine Italiano in Madrid, at the London Italian Film Festival 2012 and at the Lavazza Italian Film Festival 2012 in Sydney.

== Plot ==
The first scenes of the film are set in the historical center of the town of Termoli. A young illegal immigrant called Ivan is looking for a job. He is a bricklayer and lives in a small flat with his old and sick father. Precisely in with the intention to find a job he sets off to the Tremiti Islands, Apulia, but cannot not return as planned and had to extend his sojourn. There he meets two people who are going to help him. One is Don Enzo, an uncommon priest who lives in a small house and takes care of his bees. The other is Martina, a young woman who, since her daughter's death, has closed herself in silence, and lives in Don Enzo's house, her former tutor. Martina and Ivan become friends, and even don Enzo starts to feel some sympathy for the youngster.

The three protagonists have nothing in common, except for one thing: they live in isolation because they are different from other people. It is not by chance that the story takes place in an isolated place, in fact on islands. But precisely the fact of being different is at the origin of the mutual interest that over time becomes sympathy and friendship. In defining the characters the director underscores the difference that often generates loneliness but may also bring people closer to one another. In a time when migration is a worldwide phenomenon Chiantini's analysis is interesting.

That description of the social relationship is completed by a last character, Father Enzo's sister. She is a selfish and greedy woman who, from the first instant, distrusts the young foreigner mainly because she is interested in the property of the Father. She symbolises the world around which is united against Ivan and Martina.

== Cast ==
- Asia Argento as Martina
- Giorgio Colangeli as Don Enzo
- Anna Ferruzzo as Vilma, Don Enzo's sister
- Ivan Franek as Ivan
- Pascal Zullino: as Rocco, Vilma's friend
- Eugenio Krauss as the Violent Man
