= South of Reality =

2019 album by The Claypool Lennon Delirium

Studio album by the Claypool Lennon Delirium
- Released: February 22, 2019
- Recorded: 2018
- Studios: Rancho Relaxo, Occidental, California
- Genres: Progressive rock; psychedelia
- Length: 47:30
- Label: ATO
- Producers: Les Claypool; Sean Lennon

The Claypool Lennon Delirium chronology
Lime and Limpid Green (2017)	South of Reality (2019)	The Great Parrot-Ox and the Golden Egg of Empathy (2026)

Singles from South of Reality
- 1. "Blood and Rockets / Easily Charmed by Fools" Released: 2018

South of Reality is the second studio album by the Claypool Lennon Delirium, a collaboration between American multi-instrumentalists Sean Lennon and Primus' Les Claypool. It was released on February 22, 2019.

== Background ==
The album was preceded by the lead single and music video for "Blood and Rockets," followed by two successive prerelease tracks: "Easily Charmed by Fools" in late 2018 and "Amethyst Realm" in early 2019.

== Reception ==
Professional ratings
Aggregate scores
Source	Rating
Metacritic	78/100
Review scores
Source	Rating
AllMusic	4/5 stars
American Songwriter	4/5 stars
Paste	8.5/10
Uncut	8/10

The album received generally positive reviews from music critics, with a rating of 78 based on 7 reviews at Metacritic, which surpassed the score of 70 received by their debut LP, Monolith of Phobos. Critics praised the album's unusual sound and improvement from their debut project: Paste magazine awarded the album an 8.5/10, writing "South of Reality is weird. It’s unorthodox... That's what makes the album so damn great." AllMusic noted that "If the duo's satire sometimes seems cheap—the Tinder jibes on 'Easily Charmed by Fools' are a little too easy—they make up for it through sheer good humor, which is why the playfulness of South of Reality charms instead of alienates." Uncut called the album as "A meaty maximalist feast, richer and riper than its predecessor."

== Track listing ==
All tracks are written by Les Claypool and Sean Lennon.

No.	Title	Length
1.	"Little Fishes"	6:06
2.	"Blood and Rockets: Movement I, Saga of Jack Parsons / Movement II, Too the Moon"	6:29
3.	"South of Reality"	3:27
4.	"Boriska"	5:25
5.	"Easily Charmed by Fools"	5:10
6.	"Amethyst Realm"	7:47
7.	"Toady Man's Hour"	3:12
8.	"Cricket Chronicles Revisited: Pt. 1, Ask Your Doctor / Pt. 2, Psyde Effects"	6:23
9.	"Like Fleas"	3:31

== Personnel ==
- Les Claypool – vocals, all instruments, songwriter, engineer, mixing, producer
- Sean Lennon – vocals, all instruments, songwriter, producer
- Paulo Baldi – drums (on “Boriska”, “Amethyst Realm”, “Ask Your Doctor”)
- Adam Gates – voices (in “Psyde Effects”)
- Josh Adam Meyers – voices (in “Psyde Effects”)
- Agent Ogden – design, layout
- Jay Blakesberg – photography
- Stephen Marcussen – mastering
- Hisaki Yasuda – cover art

Credits adapted from AllMusic.

== Tour ==
=== Tour dates ===
The duo began their headlining tour in support of the album in December 2018. It ended on May 2, 2019, in New Orleans, Louisiana.

Date	City	Country	Venue
North America
December 28, 2018	San Diego	United States	The Observatory North Park
December 29, 2018	Santa Ana	United States	The Observatory
December 31, 2018	San Francisco	United States	The Fillmore
April 10, 2019	Toronto	Canada	Danforth Music Hall
April 12, 2019	Philadelphia	United States	Filmore
April 13, 2019	New Haven	United States	College Street Music Hall
April 14, 2019	Boston	United States	House of Blues
April 16, 2019	Brooklyn	United States	Brooklyn Steel
April 17, 2019	Washington D.C.	United States	9:30 Club
April 19, 2019	Asheville	United States	Orange Peel
April 20, 2019	Nashville	United States	Marathon Music Works
April 21, 2019	Atlanta	United States	SweetWater 420 Music Festival
April 23, 2019	St. Louis	United States	Delmar Hall
April 25, 2019	Minneapolis	United States	Varsity Theater
April 26, 2019	Chicago	United States	Thalia Hall
April 27, 2019	Detroit	United States	Majestic Theatre
April 29, 2019	Bloomington	United States	Castle Theatre
April 30, 2019	Covington	United States	Madison Theatre
May 2, 2019	New Orleans	United States	Civic Theatre

== Charts ==
Chart (2019)	Peak position
Belgian Albums (Ultratop Flanders)	191
Belgian Albums (Ultratop Wallonia)	86
German Albums (Offizielle Top 100)	43
Swiss Albums (Schweizer Hitparade)	52
US Billboard 200	88
