= Asterisms (album) =

Studio album by Sean Ono Lennon
- Released: February 16, 2024
- Genres: Jazz, experimental music, progressive rock
- Length: 37:09
- Label: Tzadik
- Producer: Sean Ono Lennon

Sean Ono Lennon chronology
Friendly Fire (2006)	Asterisms (2024)

Asterisms is the third studio album by American musician Sean Ono Lennon. It was released on February 16, 2024, by Tzadik Records. The album is entirely instrumental.

== Background ==
Lennon composed much of Asterisms for a series of performances at The Stone, a New York venue founded by John Zorn. The project was initially conceived as a live instrumental suite and was delayed during the COVID-19 pandemic before being performed in October 2022 with a group of collaborators including Ches Smith, Devin Hoff, Yuka Honda, João Nogueira, and Michael Leonhart.

In interviews, Lennon described the album as part of a broader creative period in which he focused on instrumental composition and experimentation, following earlier work in film scoring and collaborative projects. The material was later recorded at his studio in upstate New York.

The compositions are structured as extended pieces featuring layered instrumentation and shifting arrangements. Lennon has stated that the project reflects his interest in complex musical forms and improvisation. Critics have characterized the album as "cosmic" and genre-blending, incorporating guitar, synthesizer, brass, and percussion textures. Tinnitist's review of Asterisms was notably positive, prompting David Sheff to quote from it at length in his 2025 publication Yoko.

The release of Asterisms coincided with a period of renewed public attention for Lennon, including work on the animated short film War Is Over! and reflections on his personal history and artistic direction.

== Track listing ==
All tracks are written by Sean Ono Lennon.

1. "Starwater" - 7:43
2. "Thinking of M" - 4:40
3. "Acidalia" - 7:02
4. "Asterisms" - 10:52
5. "Heliopause" - 6:19

== Personnel ==
- Sean Ono Lennon – guitar, synthesizer
- Devin Hoff – bass
- Yuka Honda – electronics
- Michael Leonhart – trumpet
- João Nogueira – keyboards
- Mauro Refosco – percussion
- Ches Smith – drums
- Johnny Mathar – drums
