= Agony (2020 film) =

- Directed by: Michele Civetta
- Written by: Michele Civetta; Joseph Schuman
- Starring: Asia Argento; Jonathan Caouette; Monica Guerritore; Ninetto Davoli; Franco Nero; Rade Šerbedžija
- Distributed by: Gravitas Ventures
- Release date: April 3, 2020
- Country: United States
- Language: English

Agony (formerly titled The Executrix) is a 2020 American thriller film directed by Michele Civetta and starring Asia Argento, Jonathan Caouette, Monica Guerritore, Ninetto Davoli, Franco Nero and Rade Šerbedžija.

== Cast ==
- Asia Argento
- Jonathan Caouette
- Nick Daly
- Ninetto Davoli
- Giulia Di Quilio
- Monica Guerritore
- Molly Jane McCarthy
- Franco Nero
- Rade Šerbedžija
- Simone Wasserman

== Release ==
The film was released on demand on April 3, 2020.

== Reception ==
It has a rating of 20% on Rotten Tomatoes based on five reviews.

Lorry Kikta of Film Threat gave the film an 8 out of 10.
