= Traveling Companion =

1996 film

- Film poster
- Directed by: Peter Del Monte
- Written by: Peter Del Monte; Mario Fortunato
- Produced by: Enzo Porcelli
- Starring: Asia Argento; Michel Piccoli
- Cinematography: Giuseppe Lanci
- Edited by: Simona Paggi
- Music by: Dario Lucantoni
- Distributed by: Acadra Distribution (France); Atisbador S.A. (Spain)
- Release date: May 1996
- Running time: 104 minutes
- Country: Italy
- Language: Italian

Traveling Companion (Italian: Compagna di viaggio) is a 1996 Italian drama film directed by Peter Del Monte. It was screened in the Un Certain Regard section at the 1996 Cannes Film Festival. For her performance Asia Argento won the 1997 David di Donatello for Best Actress.

== Cast ==
- Asia Argento - Cora
- Michel Piccoli - Cosimo Giusti
- Lino Capolicchio - Pepe
- Silvia Cohen - Ada
- Max Malatesta - Giulio
- Sebastiano Colla - Fabio
- Germano Di Mattia - Raul
- Silvana Gasparini - Daria (girl of the pottery workshop)
- Maddalena Maggi - Cora's mother
- Patrizia Pezza - Waitress friend of Cora
- Pier Francesco Poggi - Furniture salesman (as Pierfrancesco Poggi)
- Elisabetta Rocchetti - Beautician friend
- Teresa Saponangelo - Woman in the room (as Maria Teresa Saponangelo)
- Chantal Ughi - Porter of hotel
