= Friendly Fire (2006 film) =

2006 film by Michele Civetta

- Directed by: Michele Civetta
- Written by: Sean Lennon; Michele Civetta
- Story by: Sean Lennon
- Produced by: Griffin Marcus; Manu Gargi
- Starring: Sean Lennon; Bijou Phillips; Lindsay Lohan; Asia Argento; Jordana Brewster; Carrie Fisher; Devon Aoki; Jordan Galland
- Cinematography: Bryan Newman; Steve Gainer
- Music by: Sean Lennon
- Distributed by: Capitol Records
- Release date: September 26, 2006 (Japan)
- Running time: 52 minutes
- Countries: Japan; UK; United States
- Language: English

Friendly Fire is a 2006 film written and directed by Sean Lennon and Michele Civetta. It accompanies Sean Lennon's 2006 album of the same name (as a DVD). The film comprises 10 music videos, one for each song on the album (with non-album tracks and dialog used during intermission scenes). Friendly Fire stars Lennon himself, playing a wide range of roles along with various friends and actors such as Bijou Phillips, Lindsay Lohan, Carrie Fisher and Jordan Galland. The project is dedicated to Lennon's late friend, Max Leroy (1975–2005).

Friendly Fire was shown publicly during the album's release in the United States at various independent screenings. Occasionally screened with Beck's album-film, The Information (which was released on the same day).
