= Monolith of Phobos =

Studio album by the Claypool Lennon Delirium
- Released: June 3, 2016
- Recorded: 2015
- Studio: Rancho Relaxo, Occidental, California
- Length: 50:12
- Label: ATO
- Producer: Les Claypool; Sean Lennon

The Claypool Lennon Delirium chronology
Monolith of Phobos (2016)	Lime and Limpid Green (2017)

Singles from Monolith of Phobos
- 1. "Cricket and the Genie (Movement 1, The Delirium)"; 2. "Cricket and the Genie (Movement II, Oratorio Di Cricket)"; 3. "Mr. Wright"; 4. "Bubbles Burst"

Monolith of Phobos is the debut studio album by the Claypool Lennon Delirium, consisting of American multi-instrumentalists Sean Lennon and Primus's Les Claypool, released on June 3, 2016.

== Reception ==
Professional ratings
Aggregate scores
Source	Rating
Metacritic	70/100
Review scores
Source	Rating
AllMusic	4/5 stars
Consequence of Sound	B−
Hot Press	7/10
KEXP	Favorable
Louder Sound	Favorable
PopMatters	6/10

The album received generally positive reviews from music critics, receiving a 70 rating on Metacritic. The album also received praise from the general public, sitting at an 8.6 user rating on Metacritic as of August 1, 2017.

== Track listing ==
All music is composed by Les Claypool and Sean Lennon.

No.	Title	Lyrics	Length
1.	"The Monolith of Phobos"	Claypool	4:40
2.	"Cricket and the Genie (Movement I, The Delirium)"	Lennon	3:52
3.	"Cricket and the Genie (Movement II, Oratorio Di Cricket)"	Claypool	4:16
4.	"Mr. Wright"	Claypool	4:21
5.	"Boomerang Baby"	Lennon	5:48
6.	"Breath of a Salesman"	Claypool	3:27
7.	"Captain Lariat"	Claypool	6:00
8.	"Ohmerica"	Lennon	5:08
9.	"Oxycontin Girl"	Claypool	5:03
10.	"Bubbles Burst"	Lennon	4:10
11.	"There's No Underwear in Space" (Instrumental)	Lennon	3:27
Total length:			50:12

== Personnel ==
- Les Claypool – lead vocals (1, 4, 6, 7, 9, 10), background vocals (2, 3, 5, 8, 11), bass (1–4, 6–11), upright bass (5), Mellotron (3, 4, 9), drums (9), engineer
- Sean Lennon – lead vocals (2, 3, 5, 8, 11), background vocals (1, 4, 6, 7, 9, 10), guitar (2–11), Mellotron (1–3, 5–8, 10, 11), drums (1–8, 10, 11), autoharp (9), cosmic rain drum (7)
- Matt Winegar – second engineer
- Stephen Marcussen – mastering

== Charts ==
Chart (2016)	Peak position
Belgian Albums (Ultratop Flanders)	134
Belgian Albums (Ultratop Wallonia)	160
US Billboard 200	84
