= Lime and Limpid Green =

EP by the Claypool Lennon Delirium
- Released: April 22, 2017
- Studio: Rancho Relaxo, Occidental, California
- Length: 19:59
- Label: ATO
- Producer: Les Claypool; Sean Lennon

The Claypool Lennon Delirium chronology
Monolith of Phobos (2016)	Lime and Limpid Green (2017)	South of Reality (2019)

Lime and Limpid Green is a 2017 EP of covers released by the Claypool Lennon Delirium. The album comprises four covers of songs originally by Pink Floyd, the Who, King Crimson and Flower Travellin’ Band. Lennon, whose mother Yoko Ono introduced him to the Flower Travellin’ Band’s work and who knew its members, chose their song as a nod to his fellow Japanese, who he said had been suffering since the 2011 Tōhoku earthquake and tsunami. It was originally released for Record Store Day in 2017, but it was eventually made available streaming.

The cover includes an apparent reference to Cylons from Battlestar Galactica, with the evolution of man from ape to human, into a cybernetic form, and finally a toaster, a slang term for Cylon in the 2004 series. The title of the EP is derived from the opening line of "Astronomy Domine".

== Track listing ==
Side A
No.	Title	Writer(s)	Length
1.	"Astronomy Domine" (Pink Floyd cover)	Syd Barrett	5:55
2.	"Boris the Spider" (The Who cover)	John Entwistle	2:37
Total length:			8:30

Side B
No.	Title	Writer(s)	Length
3.	"The Court of the Crimson King" (King Crimson cover)	Ian McDonald; Peter Sinfield	6:49
4.	"Satori (Enlightenment), Pt.1" (Flower Travellin' Band cover)	Joe Yamanaka; Hideki Ishima; Jun Kozuki; George Wada	4:38
Total length:			11:22

== Personnel ==
- Les Claypool – bass, vocals, engineer
- Sean Lennon – guitar, vocals
- Paulo Baldi – drums
- Pete Drungle – keyboards
- Stephen Marcussen – mastering
