= The Great Parrot-Ox and the Golden Egg of Empathy =

Studio album by the Claypool Lennon Delirium
- Released: May 1, 2026
- Studios: Rancho Relaxo (Sonoma County); The Farm (New York)
- Length: 62:26
- Label: ATO
- Producers: Les Claypool; Sean Ono Lennon

The Claypool Lennon Delirium chronology
South of Reality (2019)	The Great Parrot-Ox and the Golden Egg of Empathy (2026)

Singles from The Great Parrot-Ox and the Golden Egg of Emptahy
- 1. "WAP (What A Predicament)" Released: 20 January 2026; 2. "The Golden Egg of Empathy" Released: 25 February 2026; 3. "Meat Machines" Released: 25 March 2026; 4. "Melody of Entropy" Released: 29 April 2026

The Great Parrot-Ox and the Golden Egg of Empathy is the third studio album by the Claypool Lennon Delirium, a collaboration between Les Claypool of Primus and Sean Ono Lennon.

== Background and recording ==
Claypool said the recording of the album was "the longest I've ever spent on an album." In the same interview Lennon stated that they have two different songwriting styles that have a "really good balance for us to meet in the middle". This album marked the first time the pair had written a narrative together, Lennon said that to him the album "is more about the erosion and the vilification of empathy."

Professional ratings
Review scores
Source	Rating
The Fire Note	3.5/5

== Critical reception ==
The Fire Note in a 3.5/5 review said "Claypool and Lennon keep the circus spinning with bass-heavy weirdness, prog detours, and melodic psych-pop" while being a bit critical of the extended run time.

== Track listing ==
All tracks are written by Les Claypool and Sean Ono Lennon.

The Great Parrot-Ox and the Golden Egg of Empathy track listing
No.	Title	Length
1.	"Pro-Log"	0:36
2.	"WAP (What a Predicament)"	5:03
3.	"The Wake Up Call"	2:52
4.	"Meat Machines"	5:32
5.	"Troll Bait"	4:58
6.	"Simplest of Deeds"	2:15
7.	"Heart of Chrome"	5:14
8.	"Through the Horizon"	4:05
9.	"Mantra of the Manatee"	3:33
10.	"The Golden Egg of Empathy" (with Willow)	3:51
11.	"Cliptopia"	3:37
12.	"Cliptron Scuttle"	2:13
13.	"Melody of Entropy"	5:41
14.	"It's a Wrap"	12:56
Total length:		62:26

== Personnel ==
Credits are adapted from the album's liner notes and Tidal.

=== The Claypool Lennon Delirium ===
- Les Claypool – vocals, all instruments, production, recording, mixing, story, art direction
- Sean Ono Lennon – vocals, all instruments, production, recording, story, art direction

=== Additional contributors ===
- Stuart Markham – engineering assistance
- Padge McQuillan – engineering assistance
- Jason Mills – engineering assistance
- Matt Winegar – mixing
- Stephen Marcussen – mastering
- Gabby La La – backing vocals and sitar on "The Wake Up Call"
- Willow – vocals on "The Golden Egg of Empathy"
- Rich Ragsdale – comic book art, album art
- Chris Stevens – comic editing

== Charts ==
Chart performance for The Great Parrot-Ox and the Golden Egg of Empathy
Chart (2026)	Peak position
Austrian Albums (Ö3 Austria)	39
Belgian Albums (Ultratop Wallonia)	69
French Physical Albums (SNEP)	48
French Rock & Metal Albums (SNEP)	12
German Albums (Offizielle Top 100)	34
German Rock & Metal Albums (Offizielle Top 100)	9
Scottish Albums (Official Charts)	74
Swiss Albums (Schweizer Hitparade)	80
UK Albums Sales (OCC)	70
UK Independent Albums (Official Charts)	27
UK Rock & Metal Albums (Official Charts)	12
