= Asia Argento =

Italian actress and filmmaker (born 1975)

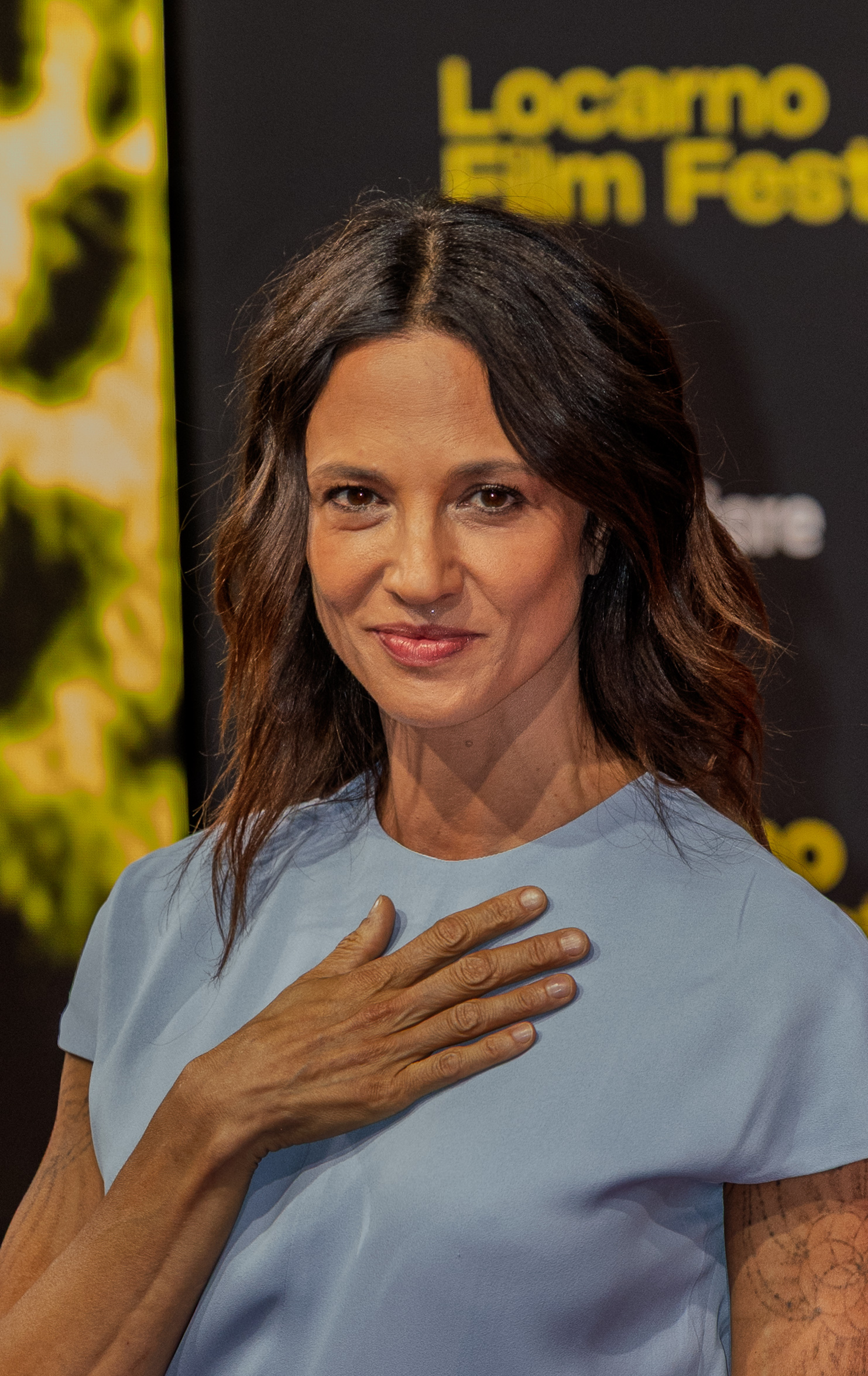
- Argento in 2026
- Born: Aria Maria Vittoria Rossa Argento; 20 September 1975 (age 51); Rome, Italy
- Other name: Aria Argento
- Occupations: Actress; filmmaker
- Years active: 1984–present
- Spouse: Michele Civetta (m. 2008; div. 2013)
- Partners: Morgan (Marco Castoldi; 2000–2006); Anthony Bourdain (2016–2018)
- Children: 2
- Parents: Dario Argento; Daria Nicolodi
- Relatives: Claudio Argento (uncle); Alfredo Casella (great-grandfather)

Asia Argento (Italian: [ˈaːzja arˈdʒɛnto]; born Aria Maria Vittoria Rossa Argento; 20 September 1975) is an Italian actress and filmmaker. The daughter of filmmaker Dario Argento, she has had roles in several of her father's features and achieved mainstream success with appearances in XXX (2002), Land of the Dead (2005), and Marie Antoinette (2006). Her other notable acting credits include Queen Margot (1994), Let's Not Keep in Touch (1994), Traveling Companion (1996), Last Days (2005), and Islands (2011). Argento is the recipient of several accolades, including two David di Donatello awards for Best Actress and three Italian Golden Globes. Her directorial credits include The Heart Is Deceitful Above All Things (2004) and Misunderstood (2014).

After the Weinstein scandal in 2017, Argento spoke publicly about her experiences and was widely discussed in connection with the "#MeToo" movement. The New York Times reported in August 2018 that actor Jimmy Bennett accused Argento of sexually assaulting him in 2013, when he was 17 and she was 37. According to reporting, Argento first met Bennett when he appeared as a child actor in her film The Heart Is Deceitful Above All Things.

== Early life ==
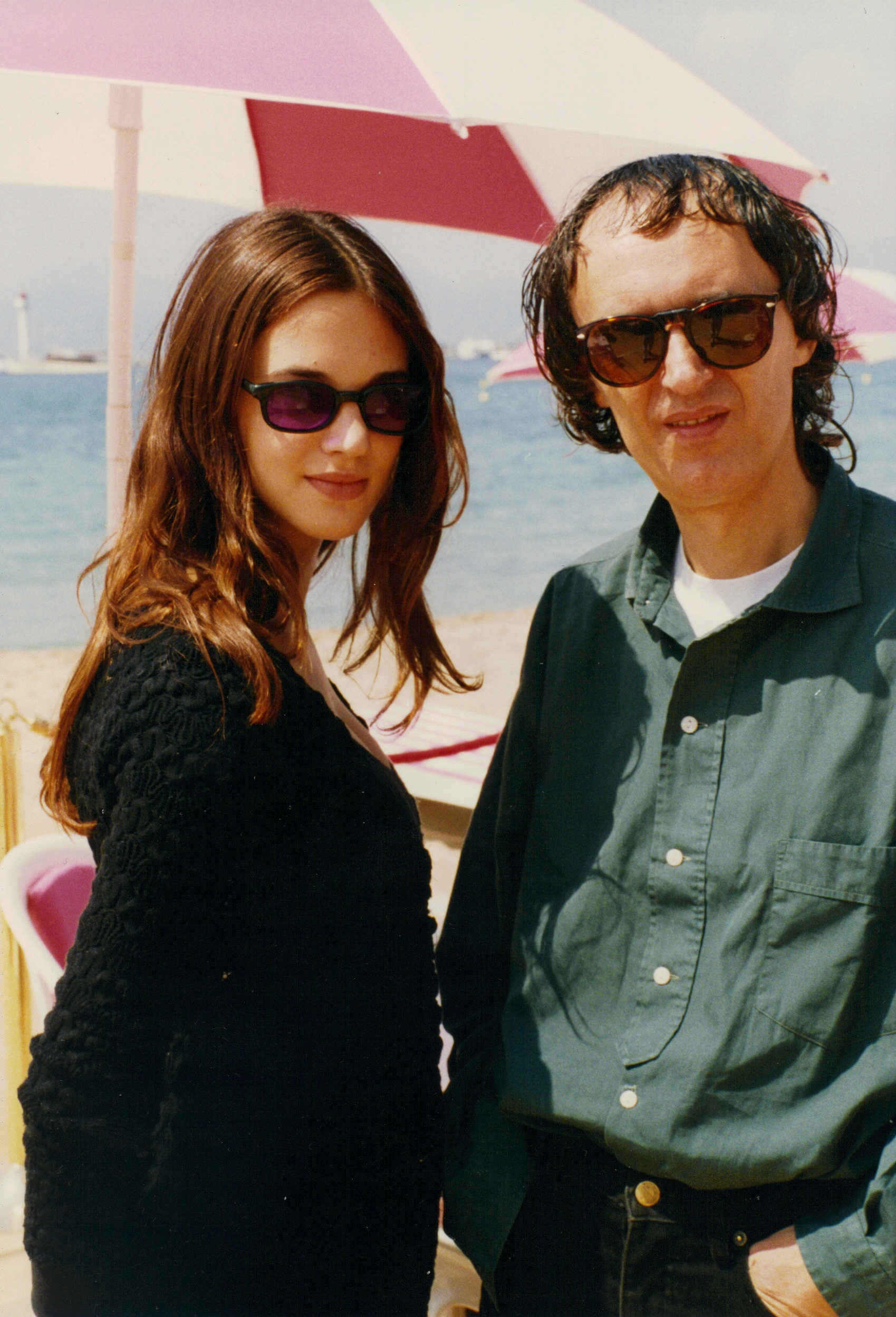
Asia Argento and her father Dario at the 1993 Cannes Film Festival

Asia Argento was born Aria Maria Vittoria Rossa Argento in Rome on 20 September 1975. Her father is Dario Argento, an Italian filmmaker known for his work in the Italian giallo genre and for his influence on modern horror and slasher movies. Her mother was actress Daria Nicolodi and her maternal great-grandfather was composer Alfredo Casella.

When Argento was born, the city registry office in Rome refused to acknowledge "Asia" as an appropriate name, and instead officially inscribed her name as "Aria" (a name accepted by the city registry). She went by the name Asia, which she later used professionally. She pronounces her name as "AH-see-ah", which friends sometimes abbreviate to sound like "Ozzie". Argento has said that as a child she was lonely and depressed, owing in part to her parents' work. Her father used to read her his horror scripts as bedtime stories. At age eight, Argento published a book of poems. At the age of 14, she ran away from home.

Argento has mentioned in interviews that she does not have a close relationship with her father. She has mentioned that he was absent when she was a child, and has also mentioned that, because of this, she did not have a happy childhood. Regarding her relationship with her father and her reason for acting, she has stated that:

I never acted out of ambition; I acted to gain my father's attention. It took a long time for him to notice me – I started when I was nine, and he only cast me when I was 16. And he only became my father when he was my director. I always thought it was sick to choose looking at yourself on a big screen as your job. There has to be something crooked in your mind to want to be loved by everybody. It's like being a prostitute, to share that intimacy with all those people.

In an interview with Filmmaker magazine, she stated that, at one time, "I was sick for a while; I was agoraphobic. I was afraid to go out of my apartment for a long time, I could only go out to work."

== Career ==
Argento began to act at the age of nine, when she was cast in a small role in a film by Sergio Citti. When she was 16, she starred in her father's film Trauma (1993). She received the David di Donatello for Best Actress in 1994 for her performance in Perdiamoci di vista, and again in 1996 for Compagna di viaggio, which also earned her a Grolla d'oro award. Argento subsequently began to appear in English-language movies, such as B. Monkey and New Rose Hotel (both 1998). Argento also performed in French-language roles, beginning with Charlotte de Sauve in La Reine Margot (1994).

Around the same time, she made her first foray into directing with the short films Prospettive and A ritroso (both 1994) and a documentary about her father (in 1996) and Abel Ferrara (in 1998). In 2000, Argento directed and wrote her first fiction feature film, Scarlet Diva (2000), which her father co-produced. In a review, Filmmaker magazine called the film "riotously funny" and dubbed Argento "a filmmaker with a great degree of promise".

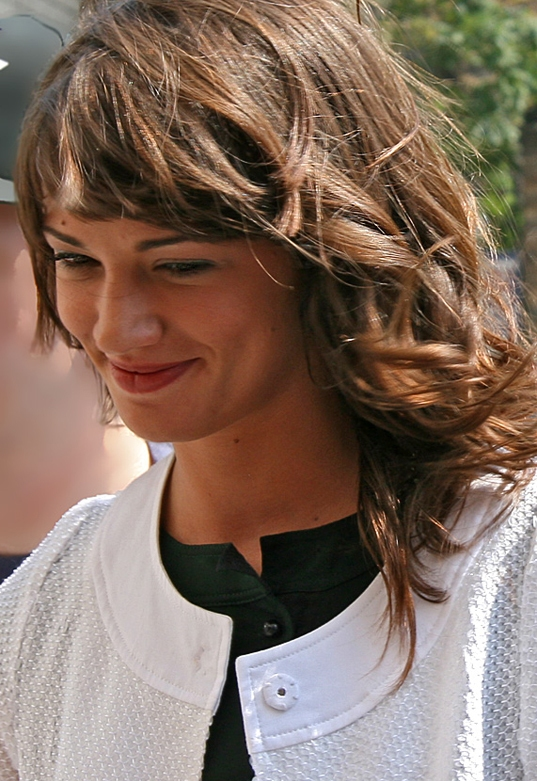
Argento at the 2007 Toronto International Film Festival

She achieved wider recognition when she portrayed Russian undercover spy Yelena in the Hollywood action film XXX (2002), alongside Vin Diesel. The film grossed $277.4 million and launched Argento to international fame. She directed her second feature film, The Heart Is Deceitful Above All Things (2004), based on a book by JT LeRoy.

In addition to her cinematic accomplishments, Argento has written a number of stories for magazines such as Dynamo and L'Espresso, while her first novel, titled I Love You Kirk, was published in Italy in 1999. She has modeled for the denim jeans brand Miss Sixty. She became a fan of the band Hondo Maclean when they wrote a track named after her and liked the track so much that she sent them pictures which they used as the cover of their 2003 album Plans for a Better Day.

She appeared in Placebo's music video for "This Picture", and appeared on Placebo frontman Brian Molko's cover version of "Je t'aime... moi non plus". Argento has also starred in Catherine Breillat's period drama The Last Mistress. She dubbed the Italian version of the video game Mirror's Edge in the role of the runner Faith Connors, from 2008 to 2009.

Argento has been part of the Legendary Tiger Man's project Femina, which was released on 14 September 2009. She is featured on the song "Life Ain't Enough for You", which was released as a single along with the B-side "My stomach is the most violent of all Italy", in which she also contributes vocals.

In May 2013, Argento's debut album, entitled Total Entropy, was released by Nuun Music.

In 2014, Argento played supporting role in the British film Shongram, a fictional romantic drama based around the factual and historical events of the 1971 Bangladesh Liberation War.

Also in 2014, she directed her third feature film, titled Misunderstood (2014), which was selected to compete in the Un Certain Regard section at that year's Cannes Film Festival. That year, while promoting the film, Argento stated that she was not going to act anymore and that she had decided to concentrate on writing and directing.

== Personal life ==
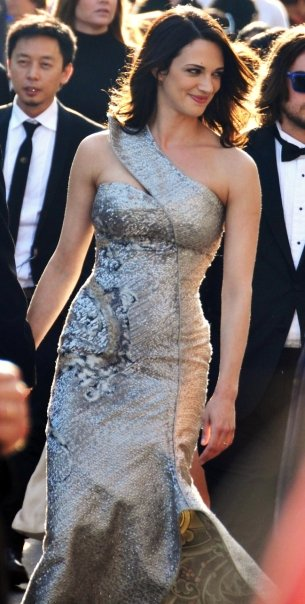
Argento at the 2009 Cannes Film Festival

Besides Italian, Argento speaks English and French, which she learned for her role in Les Morsures de L'Aube.

In 2009, Argento signed a petition in support of film director Roman Polanski, calling for his release after Polanski was arrested in Switzerland in relation to his 1977 charge for drugging and raping a 13-year-old girl. In 2017, she expressed regret for signing the petition, calling it "a mistake". She later stated that Polanski's continued career "speaks terribly of the industry".

Argento moved to Germany in 2017, citing experiences of victim blaming received in Italy following her allegations against Harvey Weinstein.

=== Relationships ===
Her first child, Anna Lou Castoldi, was born in 2001. Italian rock and roll musician Morgan (lead singer of Bluvertigo), is the father. She named her daughter after her half-sister Anna Ceroli, who died in a motorcycle accident.

Argento married film director Michele Civetta on 27 August 2008 in Arezzo. Her second child (a son) was born in 2008 in Rome. The couple divorced in 2013. She and her children live in the Vigna Clara neighbourhood of Rome.

Argento worked and became romantically involved with Anthony Bourdain in 2016 during the production of the Rome episode of Parts Unknown. Bourdain became an outspoken supporter of Argento after she made public allegations against Harvey Weinstein. Text records show that Argento and Bourdain argued heavily in the days leading to his death, and that Argento ended their relationship shortly before his suicide.

=== Sexual assault allegations against Harvey Weinstein ===
Argento alleged in an October 2017 New Yorker article by Ronan Farrow that she had been sexually assaulted by Harvey Weinstein in the 1990s. She would later have consensual albeit "one-sided" sexual relations with him. She confirmed that a scene in Scarlet Diva where her character is accosted by a movie executive was indeed a reference to Weinstein. Later, Argento stated that the "article did a huge disservice to me and to my truth by simplifying all this", and accused Farrow of "misrepresenting" what happened to her.

Argento delivered a speech on 20 May 2018, following the 2018 Cannes Film Festival, calling the festival Weinstein's "hunting ground", alleging that she was raped by Weinstein in Cannes when she was 21. She added, "And even tonight, sitting among you, there are those who still have to be held accountable for their conduct against women".

On 24 January 2021, Argento alleged that director Rob Cohen had drugged her with gamma-hydroxybutyric acid and raped her during the filming of XXX. A representative of Cohen denied Argento's assault accusation as "absolutely false".

=== Sexual assault allegation against Argento ===
On 19 August 2018, The New York Times published allegations that Argento sexually assaulted actor Jimmy Bennett. Argento had first met Bennett when he played her son in the 2004 film The Heart Is Deceitful Above All Things when Bennett was 7 and she was 28. The alleged assault occurred in 2013 when he was two months past his 17th birthday in a hotel room in California, where the age of consent is 18; Argento was 37 at the time. According to Bennett, in their encounter, Argento gave him alcohol, performed oral sex on him and had sexual intercourse with him.

Argento quietly arranged a $380,000 nondisclosure settlement with Bennett in the months following her revelations regarding Weinstein. Bennett said when Argento came out against Weinstein, it stirred memories of his own experience in 2013. He said he had sought to resolve the matter privately, and had not spoken out sooner "because I was ashamed and afraid to be part of the public narrative".

In a statement provided to the Times, he said: "I was underage when the event took place, and I tried to seek justice in a way that made sense to me at the time because I was not ready to deal with the ramifications of my story becoming public. At the time I believed there was still a stigma to being in the situation as a male in our society. I didn't think that people would understand the event that took place from the eyes of a teenage boy." Bennett said he would like to "move past this event in my life", adding, "today I choose to move forward, no longer in silence".

Argento initially denied the allegations, falsely claiming that she never had a sexual encounter with Bennett and that when he made a request for money to her, her partner Anthony Bourdain paid him to avoid negative publicity.

On 22 August, she released a statement reading: "I strongly deny and oppose the contents of the New York Times article dated 20 August 2018, as circulated also in national and international news. I am deeply shocked and hurt by having read news that is absolutely false. I have never had any sexual relationship with Bennett." A spokeswoman for the Times responded, "We are confident in the accuracy of our reporting, which was based on verified documents and multiple sources". Fellow #MeToo advocate Rose McGowan initially expressed support for Argento and implored others to show restraint, stating, "None of us know the truth of the situation and I'm sure more will be revealed. Be gentle." McGowan faced criticism on social media for her comments, which was criticized as contradicting the #MeToo movement's message of believing survivors.

Following Argento's denials, a photograph of her topless in bed with Bennett was published, as well as her alleged admission of sex with him in text messages to model Rain Dove. In the screenshots, Argento reputedly stated: "I had sex with him; it felt weird. I didn't know he was a minor until the shakedown letter."

In a letter published online in September 2018, Argento's attorney admitted there was a sexual encounter, but claimed the underage Bennett "sexually attacked" Argento. Amid the allegations, Argento was dropped as a judge on X-Factor Italy.

== Filmography ==
Film
| Year | Title | Role | Notes |
|---|---|---|---|
| 1986 | Demons 2 | Ingrid Haller | |
| 1988 | Zoo | Martina | |
| 1989 | The Church | Lotte | |
| 1989 | Red Wood Pigeon | Valentina | |
| 1992 | Close Friends | Simona | |
| 1993 | Trauma | Aura Petrescu | |
| 1993 | Condannato a nozze | Olivia | |
| 1994 | Let's Not Keep in Touch | Arianna | |
| 1994 | La Reine Margot | Charlotte de Sauve | |
| 1994 | DeGenerazione | Lorna | |
| 1996 | The Stendhal Syndrome | Detective Anna Manni | |
| 1996 | Traveling Companion | Cora | |
| 1998 | Viola Kisses Everybody | Viola | |
| 1998 | New Rose Hotel | Sandii | |
| 1998 | B. Monkey | Beatrice / B. Monkey | |
| 1998 | The Phantom of the Opera | Christine Daaé | |
| 2000 | Scarlet Diva | Anna Battista | Also writer and director |
| 2001 | Les Morsures de l'aube | Violaine Charlier | |
| 2002 | The Red Siren | Detective Anita Staro | |
| 2002 | XXX | Yelena | |
| 2004 | The Heart Is Deceitful Above All Things | Sarah | Also co-writer and director |
| 2004 | The Keeper | Gina Moore | |
| 2005 | Last Days | Asia | |
| 2005 | Cindy: The Doll Is Mine | Cindy Sherman / The Model | Short film |
| 2005 | Land of the Dead | Slack | |
| 2006 | Live Freaky! Die Freaky! | Habagail Folger | Voice |
| 2006 | Marie Antoinette | Madame du Barry | |
| 2006 | Transylvania | Zingarina | |
| 2006 | Friendly Fire | Grand Dame | |
| 2007 | Boarding Gate | Sandra | |
| 2007 | Go Go Tales | Monroe | |
| 2007 | The Last Mistress | Vellini | |
| 2007 | Mother of Tears | Sarah Mandy | |
| 2008 | On War | Uma | |
| 2009 | Diamant 13 | Calhoune | |
| 2011 | Horses | Madre | |
| 2011 | Islands | Martina | |
| 2011 | Baciato dalla fortuna | Betty | |
| 2011 | Drifters | Beatrice Plana | |
| 2012 | Dracula 3D | Lucy Kisslinger | |
| 2012 | Do Not Disturb | Monica | |
| 2012 | Firmeza | Asia | Short film |
| 2013 | The Voice Thief | Naya | Short film |
| 2013 | Cadences obstinées | Margo | |
| 2014 | Shongram | Sarah | |
| 2014 | Misunderstood | —N/a | Director and co-writer |
| 2017 | Shadow | | Short film |
| 2018 | Alien Crystal Palace | Sybille Atlante | |
| 2020 | Agony | Isidora | |
| 2021 | Sans soleil | Léa | |
| 2022 | Dark Glasses | Rita | |
| 2022 | Padre Pio | Tall Man | |
| 2022 | Vera | Asia | |
| 2023 | Let Her Kill You | Anna | |
| 2023 | Dario Argento Panico | Herself | Documentary |
| 2024 | Queens of Drama | Magalie Charmer | |
| 2024 | Romeo Is Juliet | Herself | Cameo |
| 2026 | Death Has No Master | Caro | |
| TBA | A Mother for an Hour | | |

Television
| Year | Title | Role | Notes |
|---|---|---|---|
| 1985 | Sogni e bisogni | Gloria | Episode: "Il ritorno di Guerriero" |
| 2000 | Les Misérables | Éponine Thénardier | Miniseries |
| 2004 | Milady | Sally La Chèvre | Television film |
| 2011 | Sangue caldo | Anna Rosi | Episodes: "1.1" and "1.2" |
| 2014 | Rodolfo Valentino: La leggenda | Natacha Rambova | Episode: "1.2" |

Videogames
| Year | Title | Role | Notes |
|---|---|---|---|
| 2008–2009 | Mirror's Edge | Faith Connors | Dubbed in the Italian version; Xbox 360/PlayStation 3/Microsoft Windows version |

=== Music videos ===
- "(s)AINT" – Marilyn Manson
- "This Picture" – Placebo
- "Live Fast! Die Old!" – with Munk
- "Someone" – with Archigram and Antipop
- "Sexodrome" – with Morgan
- "Life Ain't Enough for You" – with The Legendary Tigerman
- "My Stomach Is the Most Violent of All of Italy" – with The Legendary Tigerman
- "Ours" – with Tim Burgess
- "La vie est belle" – Indochine
- "Dead Meat" – Sean Lennon

== Television ==
Television programmes
| Year | Title | Role | Notes |
|---|---|---|---|
| 2016 | Anthony Bourdain: Parts Unknown | Guest | Season 10, episode "Southern Italy: The Heel of the Boot" |
| 2016 | Ballando con le Stelle | Contestant | Season 11 |
| 2018 | X Factor Italy | Judge | Season 12; auditions / judges' houses |
| 2020 | Pechino Express | Contestant | Season 8; with Vera Gemma |
| 2021 | Belve | Interviewee | Season 5 |
| 2026 | RIP: Roast in Peace | Roastee | Season 2 |

== Books ==
Argento's autobiography, Anatomy of a Wild Heart, was published in Italy on 26 January 2021.

== Discography ==
| Album | Released |
|---|---|
| Asia Argento (1 Disco Sux / 2 U Just Can't Stop the Rock / 3 Sad Core) | 2008 |
| Archigram & Friends | 2008 |
| Total Entropy | 2013 |
| Music From My Bed | 2021 |

== Awards and nominations ==
| Award | Year | Category | Nominated work | Result | Ref. |
|---|---|---|---|---|---|
| Brooklyn Film Festival | 2000 | Best New Director | Scarlet Diva | Nominated | |
| Ciak d'Oro | 1994 | Best Actress | Let's Not Keep in Touch | Won | |
| Ciak d'Oro | 1996 | Best Actress | The Stendhal Syndrome | Won | |
| David di Donatello | 1994 | Best Actress | Let's Not Keep in Touch | Won | |
| David di Donatello | 1997 | Best Actress | Traveling Companion | Won | |
| Globo d'Oro | 1989 | Best Actress | Zoo | Won | |
| Globo d'Oro | 1996 | Best Actress | Travelling Companion | Nominated | |
| Globo d'Oro | 2010 | European Award | Herself | Won | |
| Globo d'Oro | 2012 | Best Actress | Islands | Won | |
| Grolla d'oro | 1996 | Best Actress | Travelling Companion | Won | |
| MystFest | 1995 | Audience Award | De Generazione | Won | |
| Nastro d'Argento | 1993 | Best Actress | Close Friends | Nominated | |
| Nastro d'Argento | 1994 | Best Supporting Actress | Condannato a nozze | Nominated | |
| Nastro d'Argento | 1995 | Best Actress | Let's Not Keep in Touch | Nominated | |
| Nastro d'Argento | 1997 | Best Actress | Travelling Companion | Nominated | |
| Nastro d'Argento | 2006 | Best Actress | The Heart Is Deceitful Above All Things | Nominated | |
| Nastro d'Argento | 2014 | Best Screenplay | Misunderstood | Nominated | |
| Nastro d'Argento | 2014 | Bulgari Award | Herself | Won | |
| Premi Flaiano | 1994 | Best Actress | Let's Not Keep in Touch | Won | |

== Recognition ==
In 2012, Argento was highlighted in the retrospective Argento: Il Cinema Nel Sangue at the Museum of Arts and Design in New York City. The retrospective celebrated the influence of the Argento family on filmmaking in Italy and around the world. It highlighted Asia's contribution as well as that of her mother (Daria Nicolodi), father, grandfather (Salvatore), and uncle (Claudio).

== See also ==
- Cinema of Italy
