= Charlotte Kemp Muhl =

American singer-songwriter and model

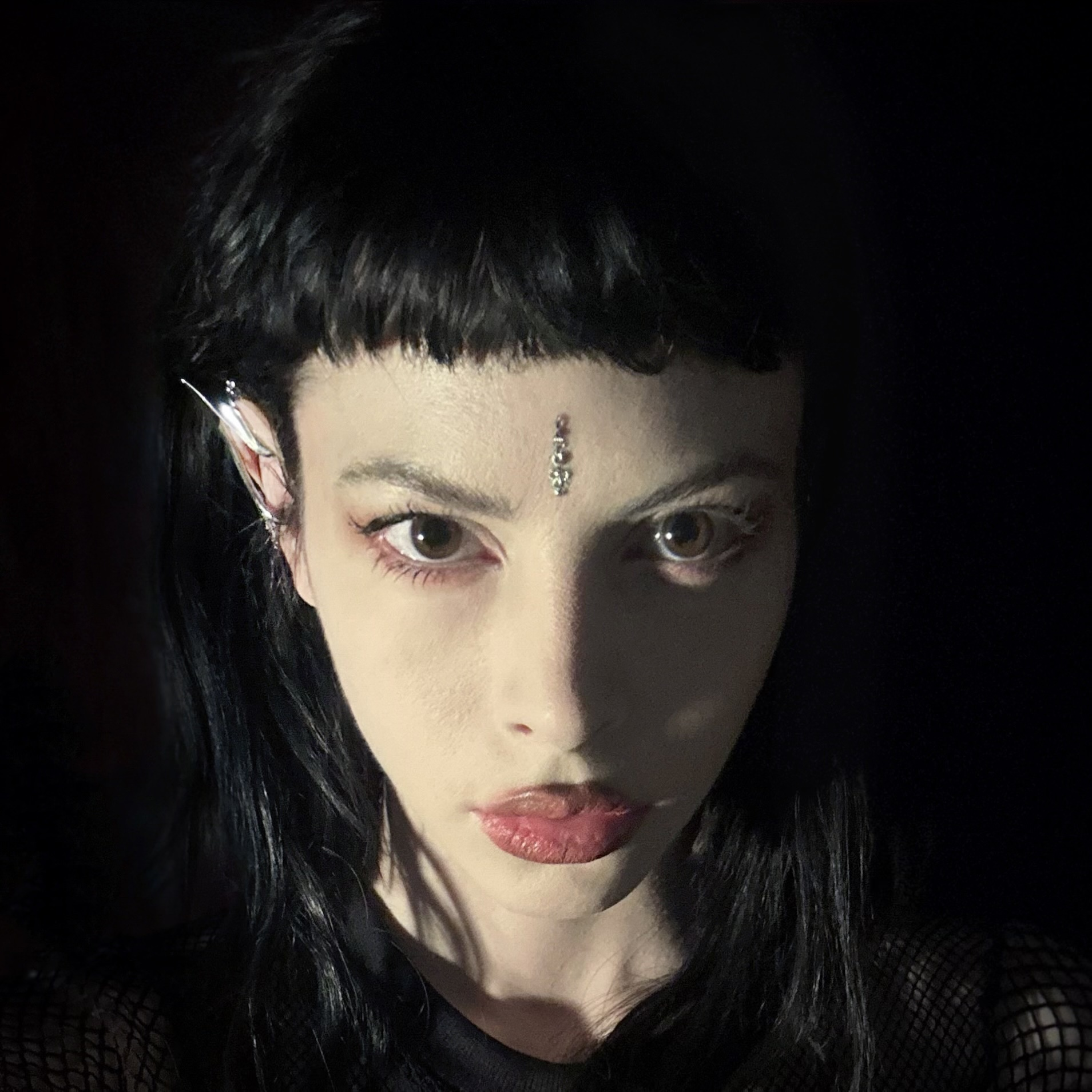
- Muhl in 2024
- Born: August 17, 1987 (age 39); Atlanta, Georgia, U.S.
- Occupations: Singer; songwriter; writer; model; director
- Partner: Sean Lennon (2007–present)
- Children: 1
- Modeling information
- Hair color: Brown
- Eye color: Brown
- Agency: Elite Model Management (New York, Paris, Barcelona, Los Angeles, Copenhagen); Models 1 (London); Model Management Hamburg; MP Management (Stockholm); Bon Image Corp. (Tokyo)
- Musical career
- Instruments: Vocals; guitar; bayan; bass guitar; keyboards
- Member of: The Ghost of a Saber Tooth Tiger; UNI and The Urchins
- Website: uni-bomber.com

Charlotte Kemp Muhl (born August 17, 1987), also known as Kemp Muhl, is an American musician, writer, model and director from Atlanta, Georgia. She is best known as a model for Maybelline.

Muhl has been in a relationship with Sean Lennon since 2007 and performs with him in the musical duo The Ghost of a Saber Tooth Tiger. She is also the bassist and band leader for the group UNI and The Urchins, which released their debut album in January 2023.

== Career ==
=== Music ===
Muhl is a singer, songwriter and multi-instrumentalist, playing guitar, bass, keyboard, and the accordion. Muhl has stated that she uses funds earned from her modeling career to produce her music. Muhl and Sean Lennon formed the record company Chimera Music.

In 2017, Muhl founded the band Uni. Currently, Uni includes vocalist Jack James and guitarist David Strange. On November 17, 2017, with their original vocalist Nico, they released their debut 7" single "What's the Problem" b/w "Adult Video". Both songs on the single had a music video, directed by Muhl, produced for them. "Mushroom Cloud", their second 7" single, was released March 23, 2018, with a video debuted on Rolling Stone.

In 2024, Muhl was the bassist in St. Vincent's touring live band supporting the release of her seventh album All Born Screaming.

She composed the score for Crispin Glover's feature film No! You're Wrong. or: Spooky Action at a Distance (2025).

=== Modeling ===
Muhl has a successful modeling career. She was under contract with Maybelline for 10 years, and has been featured in campaigns for Tommy Hilfiger, Sisley, D&G, Donna Karan, Swarovski, and Jennifer Lopez’s brand J.Lo. She has worked with Ellen Von Unwerth, Terry Richardson, Greg Kadel, Gilles Bensimon, and Steven Klein. From 2002–2005, Muhl was the spokesmodel of Vidal Sassoon in Asia, appearing in commercials and films across the continent.

=== Music videos appeared in ===
- "Imbranato" music video by Tiziano Ferro (2002)
- "Purple" music video by Whirlwind Heat (2003)
- "Just Feel Better" music video by Carlos Santana (2005)
- Music video for "Lolita" (song by Elefant) (2006)
- Music video for "Find a New Way (Terry Richardson Version)" (song by Young Love) (2007)

=== Music videos directed ===
- "Debris", by Uni
- "DDT", by Uni
- "Electric Universe", by Uni
- "American F*g", by Uni
- "Act One", by Invisible Familiars
- "Black Hanz", by the Moonlandingz
- "Blood and Guts", by Mark Stoermer
- "What's the Problem?", by Uni
- "Adult Video", by Uni
- "Donna Marijuana", by Uni

== Personal life ==
Muhl met Sean Lennon at the Coachella Valley Music and Arts Festival in 2005, and the two have been in a relationship since 2007. In an interview, Lennon stated that he discovered Muhl was musically talented over a year after they had started dating. Muhl and Lennon work together in a number of musical endeavours, and much of their work is written at their own home-based studio in Greenwich Village.

In August 2026, Muhl and Lennon welcomed their first child, a son named Aurelius.
