= Michele Civetta =

Italian film director (born 1976)

- Born: 1976 (age 48–49); Italy
- Occupation(s): Film director, artist
- Spouse: Asia Argento (m. 2008; div. 2013)
- Children: Nicola Civetta

Michele Civetta (born 1976) is an Italian film director and multi-media artist and founder of Quintessence Films.

== Career ==
Michele Civetta is an Emmy-nominated director. He has directed videos for Lou Reed, Sparklehorse, Edward Sharpe & the Magnetic Zeros, Curtis Harding, Ladytron, and Yoko Ono, as well as commercials for Coca-Cola, Martini & Rossi, Cingular wireless, and Badoit mineral water. In 2006 Civetta wrote and directed a musical feature for Sean Lennon's Capitol Records release Friendly Fire. The 50-minute film debuted January 2008 on Mark Cuban's HDNet channel.

Civetta was preparing a film based on the international bestseller Coin Locker Babies that was scheduled to shoot in the summer of 2010 in Thailand and Japan, a co-production with Don Murphy's Angry Films. Production was delayed to 2013; by May of that year, the project had been renamed Regular Boy, and it was listed on IMDb as being in "pre-production". In 2015 it was reported to be in development again with the same script and director, now starring Vincent Gallo, Liv Tyler, Asia Argento and Sean Lennon.

Civetta and his company Quintessence Films commissioned and produced a series of 42-second short films based on Dreams for 42 Below Vodka/ Bacardi. Some of the filmmakers involved include David Lynch, Kenneth Anger, Gaspar Noe, Sergei Bodrov, Larry Clark, Harmony Korine, and Taika Waititi.

Civetta embarked on a psychedelic surf film for the New York-based label Mexican summer as a collaboration with members of MGMT, Ariel Pink and Connan Mockasin. Shooting began in Nicaragua in fall 2014.

Civetta has worked with a wide array of actors including Asia Argento, Brady Corbett, Lindsay Lohan, Carrie Fisher, Devon Aoki, Paz de la Huerta, Burt Young, Grant Morrison and artists from Yoko Ono to Luigi Ontani, Donald Baechler.

In 2016 Civetta's commercial Halloween Today for NBC was nominated for an Emmy Award.

On April 3, 2020, Civetta's feature film Agony was released via Gravitas Ventures. A psychological thriller starring Asia Argento, Rade Serbedzija, Ninetto Davoli, Monica Guerritore and Franco Nero.

Civetta released feature film The Gateway, an inner city crime thriller starring Bruce Dern, Olivia Munn Shea Whigham, Frank Grillo, Mark Boone Jr., Taryn Manning and Keith David. The film has received positive critical reception upon its release.

=== Music videos ===
- "Can't Hide It" - Curtis Harding featuring Anthony Mackie and Omar Dorsey (2021)
- "Sangue" Andres Serrano (2022)
- "Ghetto Blastah" — Smims & Belle (2015)
- "Better Days" - Edward Sharp and the Magnetic Zeros (2013)
- "Ours" - Asia Argento (2013)
- "White Elephant" - Ladytron (2011)
- "Come la Cina" – Marracash (2009)
- "Little Fat Baby" – Sparklehorse (2008)
- "By the Time I Get Home" – Grand National (2007)
- "Ecstasy" – Lou Reed (2007)
- "Parachute" – Sean Lennon (2007)
- "Dead Meat" – Sean Lennon (2006)
- "Friendly Fire" – Sean Lennon (2006)
- "Now That I know" – Shannon McNally (2002)

== Personal life ==
Civetta and Italian actress Asia Argento were married on August 27, 2008, in Arezzo, Italy. The couple lived in Rome with their son, Nicola Civetta. The couple divorced in 2013.

Michele currently lives between Los Angeles, New York, and Italy with his longtime girlfriend and collaborator, DJ and music supervisor Alix Brown.
