= Sean Lennon =

British and American musician (born 1975)

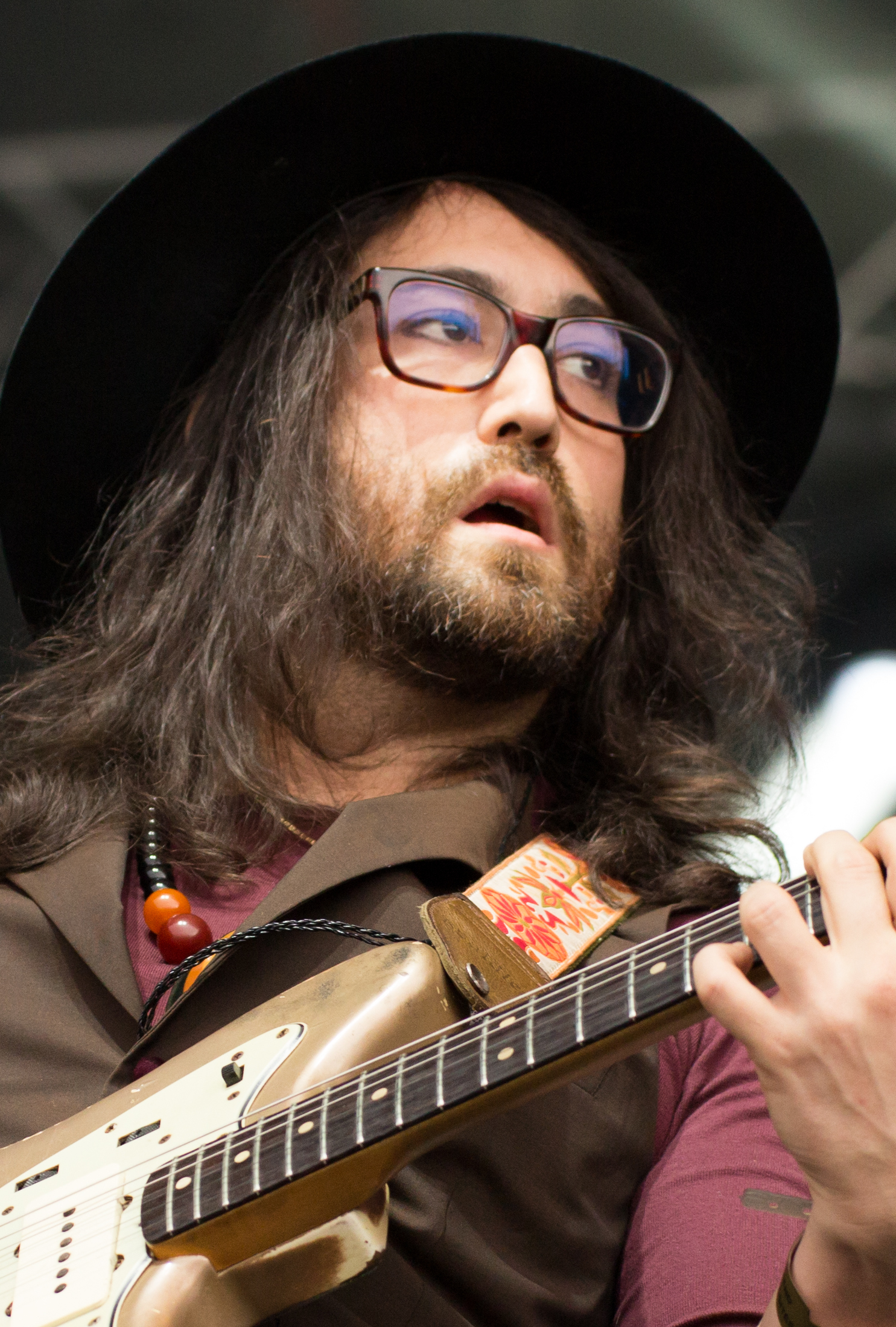
- Lennon in 2015
- Born: Sean Tarō Ono Lennon; October 9, 1975 (age 51); Manhattan, New York, U.S.
- Partner: Charlotte Kemp Muhl (2007–present)
- Children: 1
- Parents: John Lennon; Yoko Ono
- Relatives: Julian Lennon (half-brother); Julia Lennon (paternal grandmother); Alfred Lennon (paternal grandfather)
- Musical career
- Also known as: Tarō Ono (小野太郎)
- Genres: Rock; avant-garde; experimental; psychedelia
- Occupations: Singer; musician; songwriter; record producer; actor
- Instruments: Vocals; guitar; bass; keyboards; drums; omnichord
- Years active: 1987–present
- Labels: Grand Royal; Capitol; Chimera; Tzadik
- Member of: The Ghost of a Saber Tooth Tiger; The Claypool Lennon Delirium; Colonel Les Claypool's Fearless Flying Frog Brigade
- Formerly of: Cibo Matto; Plastic Ono Band; Butter 08

Sean Tarō Ono Lennon (Japanese: 小野 太郎, Hepburn: Ono Tarō; born October 9, 1975) is a British and American musician. He is the son of the musical artists John Lennon and Yoko Ono and half-brother of Julian Lennon and Kyoko Cox.

Over the course of his career, Lennon has been a member of the bands Cibo Matto, the Ghost of a Saber Tooth Tiger, the Claypool Lennon Delirium and his parents' group, Plastic Ono Band. Lennon has released three solo albums: Into the Sun (1998), Friendly Fire (2006), and Asterisms (2024). He has produced numerous albums for various artists, including Black Lips and the Plastic Ono Band. Lennon served as executive producer and music producer for One to One: John & Yoko (2024). The film centers on the only full-length post-Beatles concert John Lennon and Yoko Ono performed, the "One to One" benefit show in 1972.

== Early life and education ==
Sean Taro Ono Lennon was born at Weill Cornell Medical Center in the Lenox Hill, Manhattan neighborhood of New York City, on October 9, 1975, his father's 35th birthday. He is of Japanese descent on his mother's side and English, Welsh and Irish descent on his father's side. Julian Lennon is his half-brother, Kyoko Chan Cox is his half-sister, and Elton John is his godfather. After Sean's birth, John took a hiatus from music and became a stay-at-home dad. John was murdered on December 8, 1980, when Sean was five years old.

Lennon attended kindergarten in Tokyo and, at his request, was educated at the exclusive private boarding school Institut Le Rosey in Rolle, Switzerland, and earlier at New York's private Ethical Culture Fieldston School and Dalton School. Lennon attended Columbia University for three semesters, majoring in anthropology before dropping out to focus on his music and tour with his mother.

In October 1984, when Steve Jobs was visiting Manhattan, he attended Lennon's birthday party and gave him one of the first Macintosh computers as a present. That same year, he sang "It's Alright" on Every Man Has a Woman, a tribute album to his mother.

Lennon's parents started his musical career as his debut into the music world came at age five, when Lennon recited a story on his mother's 1981 album, Season of Glass. From childhood into his teen years, Lennon continued to collaborate with his mother, contributing vocals and receiving production credit on her solo albums It's Alright, Starpeace and Onobox. At age 16, Lennon co-wrote the song "All I Ever Wanted" with Lenny Kravitz for his 1991 album Mama Said, and worked with Kravitz on a cover of his father's song "Give Peace a Chance" in protest of the Gulf War. By 1995, Lennon had formed the band IMA (with Sam Koppelman and Timo Ellis) to play alongside his mother on her album Rising. Lennon also made appearances in film, featured in the cast of Michael Jackson's 1988 Moonwalker and portraying a teenager experiencing visions of various M. C. Escher prints in Sony's 1990 promotional short-film Infinite Escher.

Lennon holds dual citizenship with the United States through birth, and the United Kingdom by virtue of his father being British born.

== Professional career ==
=== Performance ===
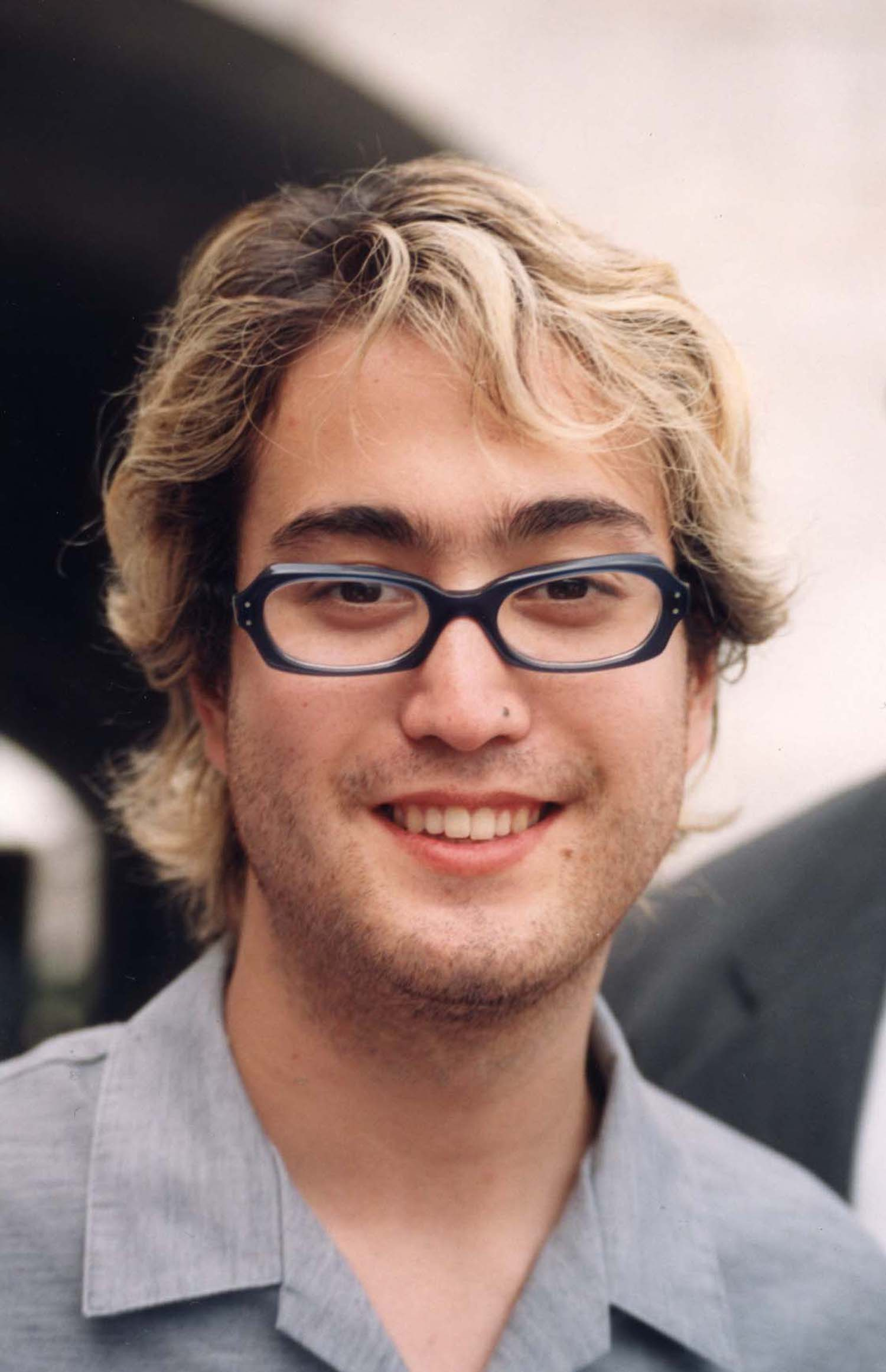
Lennon at a Free Tibet event in 1998

In 1996, Miho Hatori and Yuka Honda of Cibo Matto were invited by Ono to remix the song "Talking to the Universe" for a Rising remix EP Rising Mixes. They met Lennon and invited him to join them on tour as a bass player. This eventually led to Lennon's contributing to their side-project Butter 08 and to his becoming a member of the group. He continued to play with them on tour, joining them on television and providing bass guitar and vocals on their EP Super Relax. Through his association with Cibo Matto, Lennon was approached by Adam Yauch (of Beastie Boys), who expressed an interest in his music and persuaded him to sign a record contract with Grand Royal Records. Regarding Grand Royal, Lennon has said:

I think I found the only label on the planet who doesn't care who my parents are and what my name is. It's a good feeling to know that I wouldn't have gotten the offer if they wouldn't have liked my songs. That's pretty rare in the music business!

Lennon's solo debut, Into the Sun, was released in 1998. A music video for "Home", a single from the album, was directed by Spike Jonze and enjoyed extended airplay on MTV. The album was produced by fellow Cibo Matto member Yuka Honda, whom Lennon had begun dating at the time and whom he claimed was his inspiration for the album.

Lennon went on tour (often backed by Cibo Matto) supporting Into the Sun. During this period, he appeared on radio programs such as The Howard Stern Show and KCRW's Morning Becomes Eclectic. Lennon later recalled promoting the album as a bitter experience due to the media focus on his family rather than his own music. In 1999, Lennon's EP Half Horse, Half Musician was released featuring new tracks such as "Heart & Lung" and "Happiness" as well as remixes of songs from Into the Sun. Along with Half Horse Half Musician, 1999 saw the release of Cibo Matto's second album Stereo Type A. Lennon stepped out of his traditional role as the group's bass player, this time playing a much wider range of instruments (such as drums, guitars, and synthesizers). Despite being well-received, Stereo Type A was followed by an extended Cibo Matto hiatus.

In 2000, Lennon contributed vocals to Del tha Funkee Homosapien (a single stanza on the Deltron 3030 track "Memory Loss"), Handsome Boy Modeling School and Jurassic 5. In 2001 on national television, Lennon performed several classics by the Beatles, "This Boy", "Across the Universe" and "Julia" alongside Robert Schwartzman, Rufus Wainwright and Moby for Come Together: A Night for John Lennon's Words and Music. In the following years, Lennon faded out of the spotlight to focus more on his role as a producer.

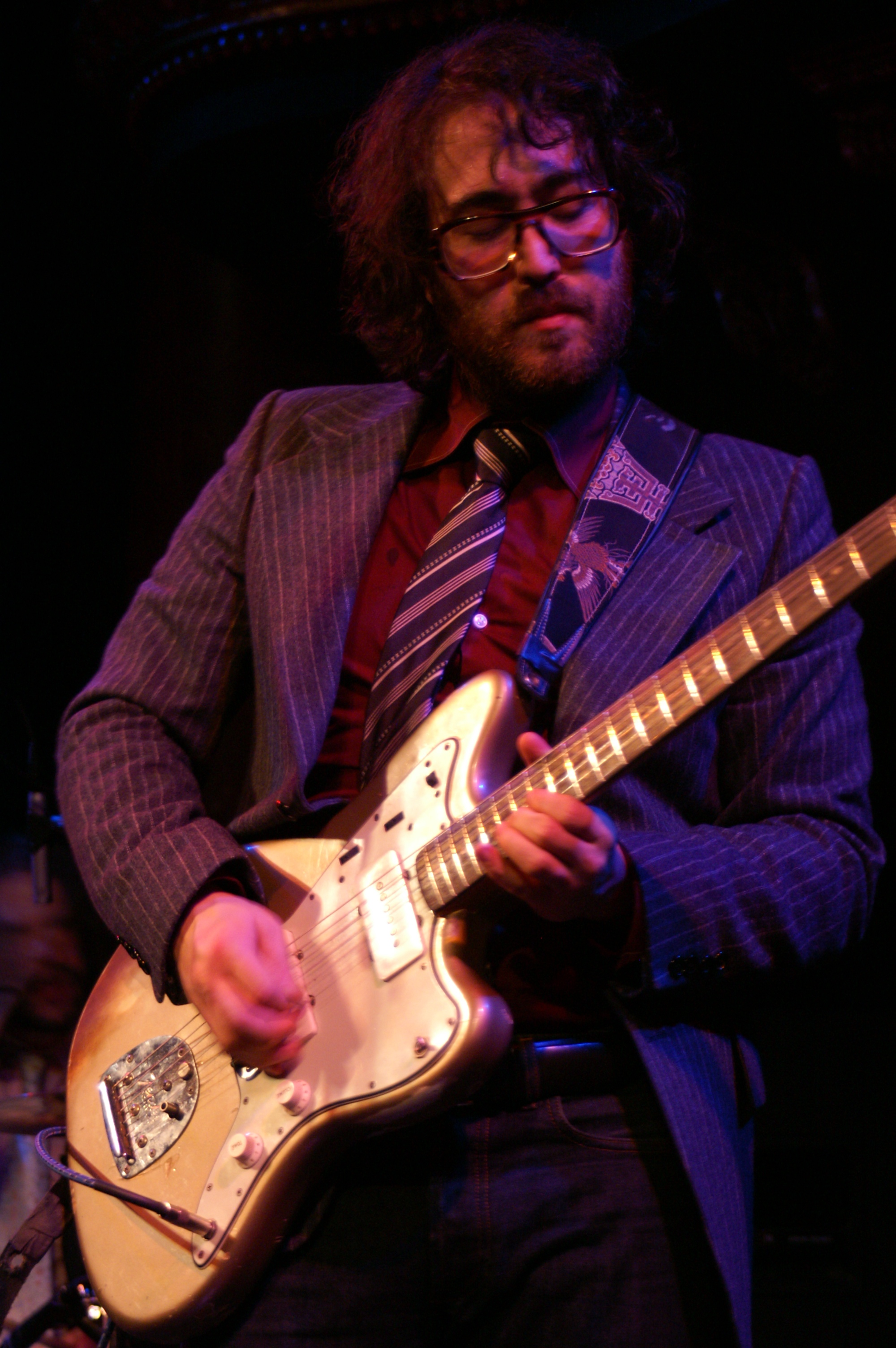
Lennon performing in 2007

In 2000, Lennon had a guest appearance on the Soulfly album Primitive on the song "Son Song". After the folding of Grand Royal Records in 2001, Lennon signed with Capitol Records, yet no solo material surfaced until February 2006, when "Dead Meat" was released as the first single from his new album, Friendly Fire. A promotional trailer for the CD/DVD package of Friendly Fire was leaked online in early 2006. The trailer featured scenes from the film version of the album, a DVD of music videos comprised into a film. The videos were actually screen tests for Coin Locker Babies, another project on which Lennon was working which became a cinematic counterpart to his new album.

Friendly Fire was released in October 2006. The theme of the album is love and betrayal, and it is dedicated to the memory of a close friend who died. The night the album was released, Lennon made his first major television appearance in five years, performing "Dead Meat" live on the Late Show with David Letterman. Lennon has since appeared on Late Night with Conan O'Brien and The Sharon Osbourne Show. When questioned about the eight-year gap between solo albums in interviews, Lennon said that he did not feel like a solo artist during those years and that he wanted to experience music anonymously without the spotlight on him and his girlfriend.

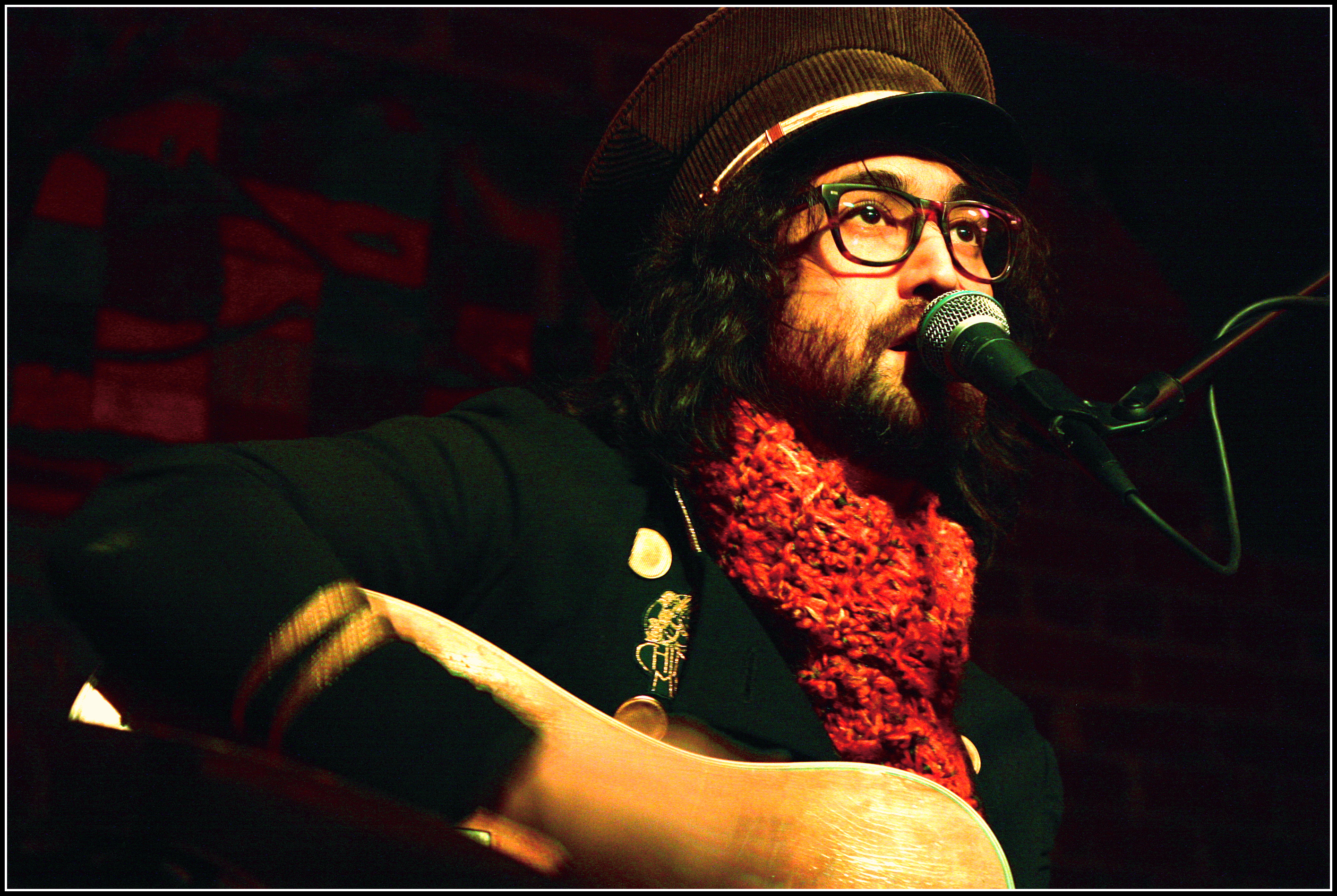
Lennon performing in 2011

Since the release of Friendly Fire, Lennon has toured extensively around the world and while in France, he remixed his song "Parachute" in collaboration with French artist -M-. The remix is titled "L'éclipse" and was featured as a bonus track on the French release of Friendly Fire, while the single "Dead Meat" was featured in an episode of the TV drama True Blood.

With the release of new material and subsequent touring Lennon launched a website featuring music, videos, and a forum for his fans. Various members of the forum have created a fan-made cover album titled Truth Mask Replica.

Muhl and Lennon premiered the band the Ghost of a Saber Tooth Tiger during a live performance at Radio City on Valentine's Day, 2008. The duo, commonly referred to as the GOASTT, released their debut single, "Jardin Du Luxembourg", on July 6, 2010, and their debut album, Ghost of a Saber Tooth Tiger (Acoustic Sessions), on October 26, both on Chimera, their own label. In conjunction with the debut, they performed six songs during an hour-long interview on WNYC and four songs for a Tiny Desk Concert on NPR. Lennon has also collaborated with Muhl with a group called "Kemp and Eden" who premiered at The Living Room in the spring of 2012. On April 29, 2014, the Ghost of a Saber Tooth Tiger released their most successful album to date, titled Midnight Sun. The album was selected as one of the Top 50 best albums of 2014 by Rolling Stone. The album's release was followed by tours with the Flaming Lips, Tame Impala, Beck, Florence and the Machine, Dinosaur Jr., and Primus.

At the end of 2018, Lennon collaborated with Miley Cyrus and Mark Ronson for a cover of Yoko Ono and John Lennon's original Christmas song "Happy Xmas (War is Over)." The trio performed the song at the Winter finale of Saturday Night Live.

In 2015, Lennon co-founded the Claypool Lennon Delirium with Primus' lead vocalist and bassist Les Claypool, with Lennon playing lead guitar. The following year, the group released their debut album, Monolith of Phobos, which reached the Top 10 of three Billboard charts, followed by the covers EP Lime and Limpid Green in 2017. Their second album, South of Reality, was released on February 22, 2019.

=== Production and other contributions ===
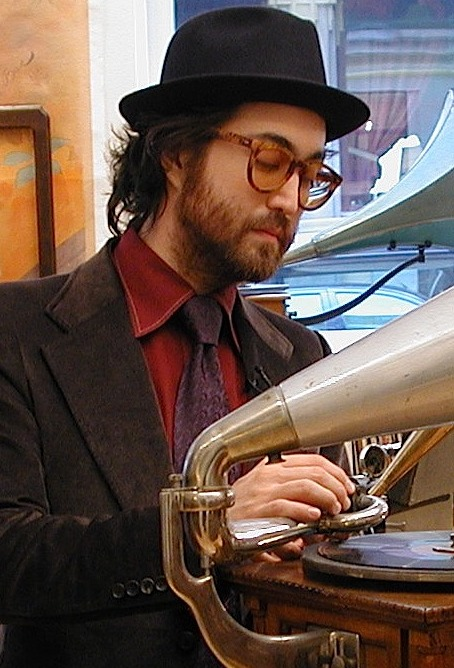
Lennon in 2006

While reestablishing himself as a solo artist, Lennon continued his work as a session musician and producer, lending his talent to the likes of Dopo Yume, Albert Hammond, Jr. (of the Strokes) and model/singer Irina Lăzăreanu. Lennon first appeared on the Soulfly album Primitive, released in 2000, while in October 2007, Lennon joined Mark Ronson in the BBC Electric Proms where he sang "Sail on, Sailor", as well as "We Can Work It Out" alongside Daniel Merriweather, and Tawiah. The year prior, Lennon wrote and directed his first film, Friendly Fire, starring Carrie Fisher, Lindsay Lohan and others. His eponymous second studio LP served as the film's soundtrack as well.

In 2009, Lennon produced a second album for his mother on his record label Chimera Music, Between My Head and the Sky, by Yoko Ono and the Plastic Ono Band. Lennon further worked with Ono as a producer for John Malkovich's 2016 remix EP Illuminated. Lennon co-produced Fat White Family's 2016 album Songs for Our Mothers, which was recorded in his New York City recording studio. Lennon also lent his production and songwriting talents to Lana Del Rey's fifth studio album Lust for Life, where he featured on the track "Tomorrow Never Came".

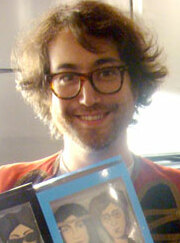
Lennon in September 2011

Lennon entered the field of film scores in 2009 with Rosencrantz and Guildenstern Are Undead, directed by long-time friend and school mate Jordan Galland. Lennon again collaborated with Galland as he contributed the score to the 2012 film Alter Egos, and appeared as the character "Electric Death." The soundtrack premiered on Rolling Stone's website following the film's release. In 2014, Lennon contributed the song "Animals" for the Zombeavers soundtrack, while he additionally wrote and recorded "Heart Grenade" for the Japanese anime TV series Ghost in the Shell: Arise. Lennon also created the film score for the 2015 comedy horror film Ava's Possessions, a project which took over two years to create. The lead single from the soundtrack "Demon Daughter" premiered alongside the film's DVD release.

Along with girlfriend Charlotte Kemp Muhl, Lennon started a record label, Chimera Music, which has signed a number of his collaborators including the Moonlandingz, Cibo Matto and Yoko Ono.

On April 12, 2024, James McCartney, son of Paul McCartney, released a song called "Primrose Hill" with Sean being credited as a composer and songwriter, marking their first collaboration.

Lennon is credited as co-producer for one song ("In the Eyes of the Girl") on the fifth studio album by The Lemon Twigs, "A Dream Is All We Know", and is credited as playing bass guitar on the same track.

=== Restorations ===
Lennon contributed significantly to the restoration of Power to the People (Super Deluxe Edition), a 12-disc box set released in 2025, by overseeing the remastering and curation of 123 tracks, including 90 previously unreleased recordings, such as demos, home tapes, studio jams, and live performances, allowing for a deeper exploration of his father John Lennon's politically charged and activist-driven music from the early 1970s; through this process, Lennon reflected on the personal significance of rediscovering unheard material, which offered him a renewed connection to his father's artistic and political legacy during a transformative period in his life.

== Activism and beliefs ==
From 1996 to 1999, Lennon performed in and was involved in organizing the Tibetan Freedom Concerts with Adam Yauch of the Beastie Boys. The series advocated for the independence of Tibet from China.

On October 19, 2011, Lennon was asked by Josh Sigurdson over Twitter what his opinion on the Occupy Wall Street protests was. He replied: "I'm heading down there this weekend." Three days later, Lennon showed up on Wall Street with Rufus Wainwright and Josh Fox. The three played music throughout the day to protesters and others joined in. Lennon did not speak to the media or press about the event.

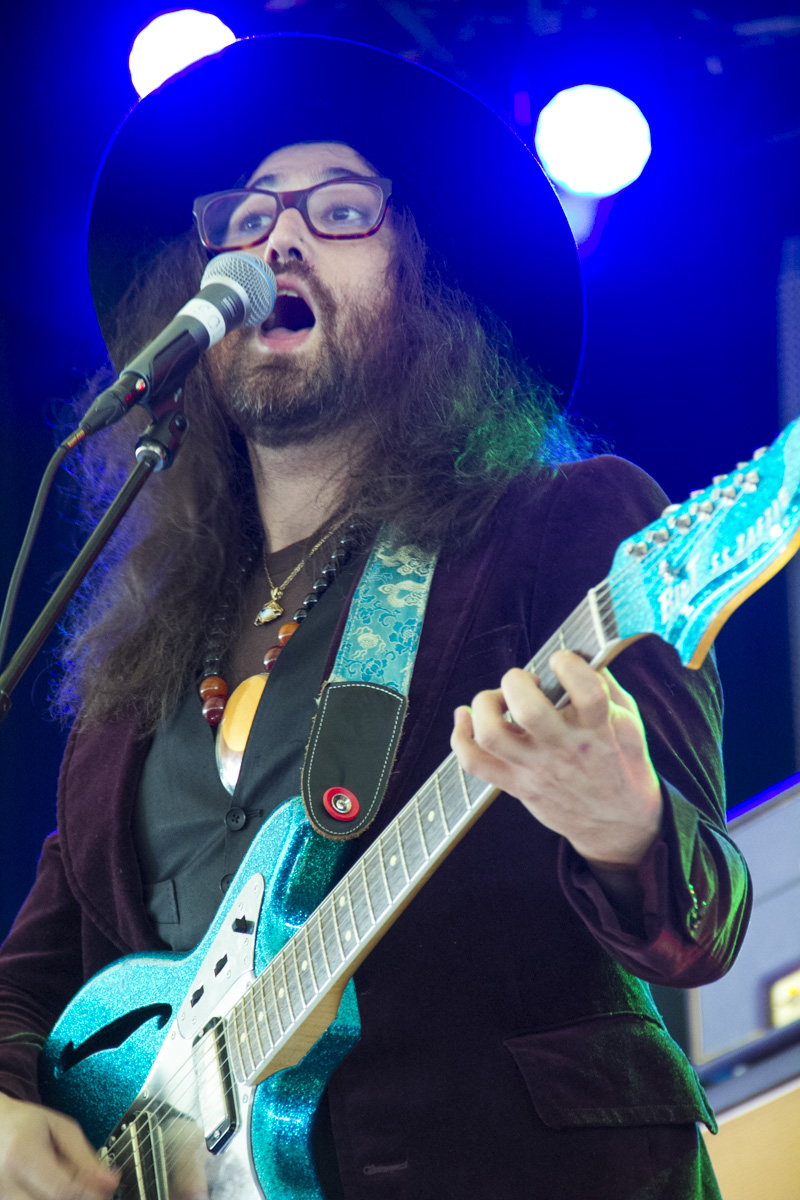
Lennon performing in July 2015

On August 28, 2012, Lennon's opposition to hydraulic fracking was published as an op-ed article, "Destroying Precious Land for Gas", by The New York Times. Of Artists Against Fracking, in 2014 he said that "we can make more people aware of the damage fracking poses to our water supply, global warming, and climate change. Methane is 100 times more powerful of a greenhouse gas than carbon dioxide and most people don't realize how climate change will be triggered by a globalized fracking industry." On August 30, 2012, Lennon unveiled "Artists Against Fracking", a campaign aimed at preventing the expansion of fracking in the United States. Over 200 artists have signed onto the initiative, including Mark Ruffalo and Anne Hathaway, as well as Beatles' members Paul McCartney and Ringo Starr.

Asked by the Dallas Observer for his view of religion and spirituality, Lennon said: "I'm not against religion, because I think it serves a purpose in our society and it can be helpful to certain groups of people. But, for me, religion is mythology. ... I do think we all have a spirit, and I think there's a lot more to life and human consciousness than science can explain. But I prefer looking to science for answers because it can be tested and vigorously logical." On October 16, 2013, Lennon, along with Spacehog and Liv Tyler, played "Live on Earth" – an Internet-only performance – to benefit the David Lynch Foundation, which funds the teaching of Transcendental Meditation. Of his own practice of Transcendental Meditation, in 2014, Lennon said that "for me, it's like a scientific method to calm my brain down and making my frontal lobe more active. It's an exercise, really. It helps me to have about 10 percent more conscious thinking."

Lennon once described himself as a pacifist, capitalist, and anarchist; on February 6, 2016, Lennon tweeted, "AnCap is the only logical result of the non aggression [principle]. I am a pacifist so therefore an anarchist."

== Personal life ==
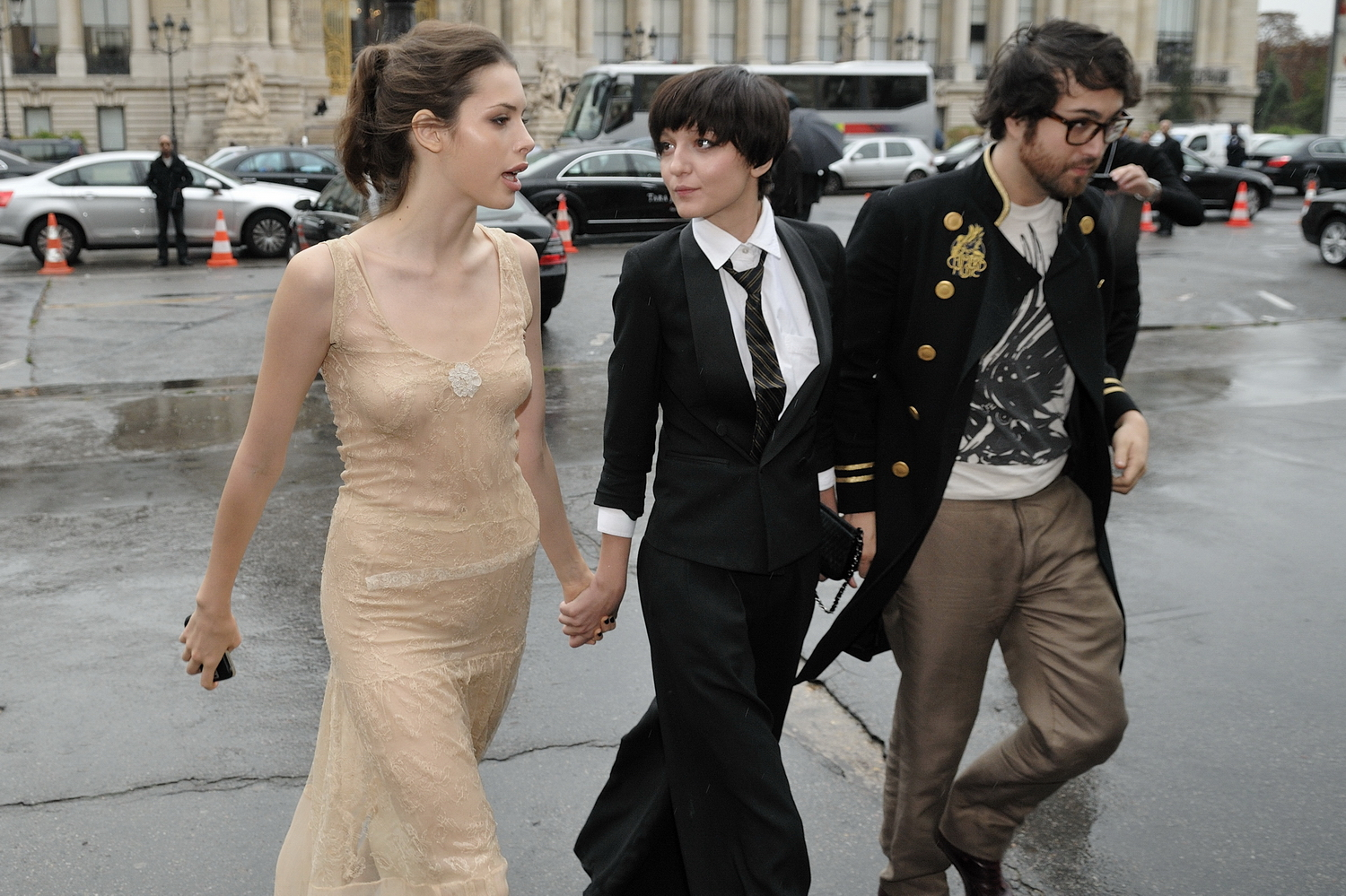
Sean Lennon in 2009 with models Irina Lăzăreanu (center) and his partner Charlotte Kemp Muhl (left)

Lennon is in a relationship with Charlotte Kemp Muhl, whom he met at the Coachella Valley Music and Arts Festival in 2005. In an interview, Lennon states that he stumbled upon Muhl's musical talents over a year after they had started dating, and formed the Ghost of a Saber Tooth Tiger around 2008. They have one son, born in August 2026.

Muhl and Lennon are involved in several musical endeavors and much of their work is written at their home-based studio in Greenwich Village, New York.

== Discography ==
=== Solo releases ===
==== Studio albums ====
| Title | Details | Peak chart positions | | | | Certifications |
| Title | Details | US | FRA | JPN | UK | Certifications |
|---|---|---|---|---|---|---|
| Into the Sun | Released: May 8, 1998; Label: Grand Royal; Format: LP, CD | 153 | — | 50 | 90 | |
| Friendly Fire | Released: October 2, 2006; Label: Parlophone, Capitol, EMI; Format: LP, CD | 152 | 59 | — | — | SNEP: Silver |
| Asterisms | Released: February 16, 2024; Label: Tzadik; Format: LP, CD, streaming | — | — | — | — | |

==== Extended plays ====
- Half Horse, Half Musician (1999)

=== with Cibo Matto ===
- Super Relax (1997)
- Stereo Type A (1999)

=== with the Ghost of a Saber Tooth Tiger ===
- Acoustic Sessions (2010)
- La Carotte Bleue (2011)
- Midnight Sun (2014)

=== with Yoko Ono/Plastic Ono Band ===
- Rising (1995)
- Blueprint for a Sunrise (2001)
- Don't Stop Me! EP (2009)
- Between My Head and the Sky (2009)
- The Flaming Lips 2011 EP: The Flaming Lips with Yoko Ono/Plastic Ono Band (2011)
- Take Me to the Land of Hell (2013)

=== with Mystical Weapons ===
- Mystical Weapons (2012)
- Crotesque (2013)

=== with the Claypool Lennon Delirium ===
- Monolith of Phobos (2016)
- Lime and Limpid Green (2017)
- South of Reality (2019)
- The Great Parrot-Ox and the Golden Egg of Empathy (2026)

Sean Lennon performing with the Claypool Lennon Delirium at Jacob’s Pavilion in 2026

=== Film scores ===
- Smile for the Camera (2005)
- The Stranger (2008)
- Rosencrantz and Guildenstern Are Undead (2008)
- Tea Fight (2008)
- Alter Egos (2012)
- Ava's Possessions (2015)

=== Producer ===
- Soulfly – Primitive (2000)
- Valentine Original Soundtrack (2001)
- Five Children and It Soundtrack (2004)
- Esthero – Wikked Lil' Grrrls (2005)
- Irina Lăzăreanu – Some Place Along the Way (2007)
- Yoko Ono/Plastic Ono Band – Between My Head and the Sky (2009)
- The Ghost of a Saber Tooth Tiger - Acoustic Sessions (2010)
- The Ghost of a Saber Tooth Tiger - Midnight Sun (2010)
- The Ghost of a Saber Tooth Tiger - La Carotte Bleue (2011)
- Kemp & Eden – Blackhole Lace (2012)
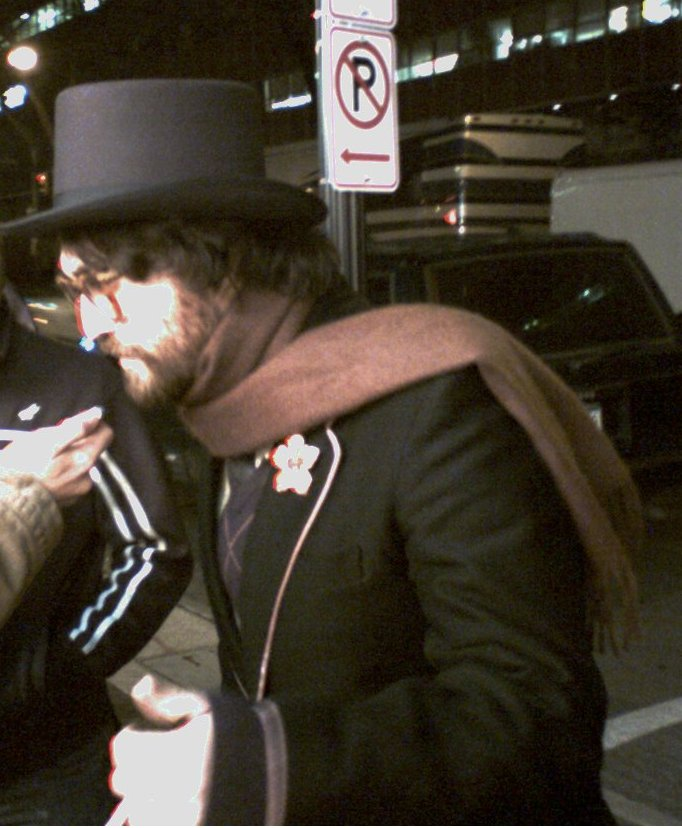
  Lennon in 2006
- Plastic Ono Band - Take Me to the Land of Hell (2013)
- Fat White Family - Songs for Our Mothers (2016)
- Lana Del Rey – Lust for Life (2017)
- The Moonlandingz - Interplanetary Class Classics (2017)
- Black Lips - Satan's Graffiti or God's Art? (2017)
- Insecure Men - Insecure Men (2018)
- Temples - Paraphernalia (2020)
- Glüme – Main Character (2023)
- Temples - Exotico (2023)
- The Lemon Twigs - A Dream Is All We Know (2024)

=== Other contributions ===
- Marianne Faithfull's album Easy Come, Easy Go (2008) – "Salvation" (originally by Black Rebel Motorcycle Club)
- Salyu's compilation album Merkmal (2008) – "Shady"
- Lennon contributed vocals and guitar to "Son Song", on the Soulfly album Primitive. He can be heard in the final seconds of the song talking about how Soulfly guitarist/vocalist Max Cavalera's heavy-gauge strings hurt his fingertips.
- Deltron 3030's album Deltron 3030 (2000) – "Memory Loss"
- Lennon sang backing vocals on the track "Sandpaperback" on Ben Lee's 1998 album Breathing Tornados.
- Collaborated in John Zorn's Great Jewish Music tributes to Marc Bolan, Burt Bacharach and Serge Gainsbourg, in 1997 and 1998.
- Sean Lennon Vs. Kool Keith - "Rockets on the Battlefield" single (1999, Grand Royal)
- Lennon remixed Tom Ze's single "O Olho Do Lago" in 1999.
- Lennon made a spoken-word contribution to the Flaming Lips' "Found This Star on the Ground", a six-hour song. Lennon read the names of charity contributors who had donated in order to have their names featured in the song.
- Lennon was a featured artist on the track "Before the Skies" for Haale's EP Paratrooper.
- Lennon contributed vocals for the 2011 film A Monster in Paris.
- Lennon co-wrote "Perfect Crime" with John Zorn (sung by Mike Patton and Sofia Rei Koutsovitis) for 2014's "The Song Project".
- Lennon remixed the Moonlandingz' 2015 single "Sweet Saturn Mine" through Chimera Music.
- Lennon covered "Row Bulies Row" with Charlotte Kemp Muhl and bassist Jack Shit for Son of Rogues Gallery: Pirate Ballads, Sea Songs & Chanteys (2013).
- Lennon played slide guitar in Lady Gaga's "Sinner's Prayer", from her 2016 album Joanne.
- Lennon appeared with the Sachal Ensemble on their album Song of Lahore (Universal, 2016)
- Lennon remixed John Malkovich's 2016 single "Cryolite".
- Lennon was a featured artist on the track "Tomorrow Never Came", included on Lana Del Rey's 2017 album Lust for Life.
- Lennon co-wrote "Theme for Valhalla Dale", from the Moonlandingz 2017 album, Interplanetary Class Classics.
- Lennon recorded a cover of "(Happy Xmas) War Is Over" with Miley Cyrus and Mark Ronson in 2018.
- Lennon performed "Mambo Sun" with Charlotte Kemp Muhl on Angelheaded Hipster: The Songs of Marc Bolan & T. Rex, and the duo performed the song on Late Late Show with James Corden (2020)
- Lennon performed with Lily Allen on her album No Shame (2018)
- Lennon performed "Come Together" with Aerosmith at Madison Square Garden (2012)
- Lennon is credited as composer/songwriter for the 2024 James McCartney track "Primrose Hill"
- Lennon played bass on the tracks "Church Bells" and "In The Eyes Of The Girl" for the Lemon Twigs' A Dream Is All We Know (2024)

== Filmography ==
- Moonwalker (1988) – Himself
- Imagine: John Lennon (1988) – Himself
- Buffy the Vampire Slayer – Season 2, Episode 1 – "When She Was Bad" (1997) – musician, Cibo Matto
- Melrose Place – Season 7, Episode 8 – "The World According to Matt" (1998) – Himself
- Smile for the Camera (2005) – Original score, writer
- Friendly Fire (2006) – Actor, original score, writer
- Coin Locker Babies (2008 in production) – Actor, writer
- Rosencrantz And Guildenstern Are Undead (2010) - Score
- A Monster in Paris (2011) – Francœur (English dub)
- Alter Egos (2012) – Original score, cameo appearance
- Ghost in the Shell: Arise, Episode 3 (2014) – Singer, lyrics
- Ava's Possessions (2015) – Original score
- Poker Face Episode 8, Guest Number 1
- No! You're Wrong. or: Spooky Action at a Distance - Instrumentals and voice of "Dream Toddler"

== Bibliography ==
- Part Asian, 100% Hapa by Kip Fulbeck (2006) – Lennon is credited with writing the foreword.
- Arcana III by John Zorn (2008) - Lennon wrote the essay "Muse or Ick"
