= Ketchen =

Ketchen may refer to:

== Surnames ==
- Brad Ketchen, Canadian founder of Hollowphonic festival
- Huntly Ketchen (1872-1959), Canadian politician

== Places ==
- Ketchen, Saskatchewan, hamlet

== See also ==
- Ketch (disambiguation)
