= Alter Egos =

- Directed by: Jordan Galland
- Written by: Jordan Galland
- Produced by: Dan Farah; Jordan Galland
- Starring: Kris Lemche; Sean Lennon; Danny Masterson; Geneva Carr
- Cinematography: Christopher LaVasseur
- Edited by: Jordan Galland
- Music by: Sean Lennon
- Production companies: Attic Light Films; Cloud 9 Film Partners; Off Hollywood Pictures; Offhollywood Digital
- Distributed by: Phase 4 Films; SModcast Pictures
- Release dates: July 24, 2012 (Fantasia Film Festival); October 19, 2012 (United States)
- Running time: 77 minutes
- Country: United States
- Language: English

Alter Egos is a 2012 American superhero comedy film written, edited, and directed by Jordan Galland. The film, starring Kris Lemche, Sean Lennon, Danny Masterson, and Geneva Carr, was distributed by Kevin Smith's SModcast Pictures and Phase 4 Films. It premiered was at the Fantasia Film Festival on July 24, 2012, where it was chosen as an official selection.

== Plot ==
The plot follows the misadventures of the Fridge, an under-appreciated superhero, at a time when superheroes have lost government funding and all public support. In a synopsis by Interview Magazine:

"Alter Egos inhabits a fantasy world where superheroes are a dime a dozen. If you have the powers, as lead supers Fridge (Kris Lemche), and C-Thru (Joey Kern), do, then, well, you can practice them for good, as long as you follow the guidelines, or at least some of them. Quite obviously, this is a parody of parodies and flips the superhero genre on its head. Like Superman, Fridge is dorky in his human clothes. Unlike Superman, it's not because he has to do so to keep his identity under wraps—more like he uses his superhero garb to explore different facets of his personality, as evidenced by the title. Somewhere along the storyline, he must tackle the fact that his girlfriend loves his superhero identity more than his unmasked self, and, naturally, face his nemesis, the man who killed his mom and dad—although he really doesn't want to."

We went through several versions of the style, or the approach, that we were going to take. At first, we did a kind of goofy, Napoleon Dynamite sort of thing which didn't really work out. It sort of highlighted the wrong aspects of the film. Then there was another direction we went, which was a retro Italian superhero film, kind of a Barbarella direction. I really enjoyed making that music, but it didn't ground the film and it lacked gravity. Despite how silly the film is and how kind of comedic it is, it needed a certain seriousness to sort of propel the more important aspects of the narrative – you know, the parents having been killed by this bad guy and the superhero avenging the murder of his parents. It needed some grounding. That was when we sort of went with the third direction, which was kind of a straight-up action hero style– a serious, orchestrated superhero score.

— Sean Lennon in Rolling Stone Interview

== Cast ==
- Kris Lemche as Brendan/"Fridge"
- Sean Lennon as "Electric Death"
- Danny Masterson as "Jimmy"
- Geneva Carr as Newscaster
- Joey Kern as "C-Thru"
- John Ventimiglia as Shrink
- Brooke Nevin as Claudel
- Christine Evangelista as Emily
- Kristina Klebe as "Ice Scream"
- Marina Squerciati as Dr. Sara Bella
- Aurélie Claudel as Rich woman
- Carlos Velazquez III as Moon Dog

== Production ==
Musician Sean Lennon, besides playing "Electric Death", also contributed the musical score for this film. Galland and Lennon have been friends for around 15 years, and have collaborated on each other's albums. Lennon also scored Galland's 2009 feature, Rosencrantz and Guildenstern Are Undead, and also worked with Galland on his award-winning debut short, surreal film Smile for the Camera.

=== Music ===
Rolling Stone editor Matthew Perpetua discusses the process of developing the soundtrack of Alter Egos in an interview with Sean Lennon. Oh No They Didn't states the following: "Lennon, who also makes a cameo as a super villain, began working on the project earlier this summer, composing what Galland describes as "an epic superhero sound."

In Variety, in an interview with Sean Lennon, he discusses the blending of various genres for the soundtrack "When it came time for writer/director Jordan Galland to give his friend and musical colleague Sean Lennon instruction on scoring his indie film, "Alter Egos," Galland recalls requesting "something that feels like 'Twin Peaks' at times and that feels like it's harnessing the power of 'The Dark Knight' at times." Twitch Film Premiered the Trailer on its website, and editor Todd Brown had the following to say about it: "While I won't spoil the cause of the 'emotional crisis' here — it's contained in the trailer and is pretty damn fantastic — this whole thing just oozes style and charm and a sense of comedy based in wit and a sincere love for the genre. Galland takes himself in some new directions here while still preserving the unique voice that made Rosencrantz an indie hit."

== Release ==
Daniel Schechter, a personal friend of Galland's, did the trailer in exchange for Galland providing the soundtrack for Supporting Characters. The trailer was featured on Hipster GeekChicDaily.

Popular online magazine Interview featured Alter Egos in its "Thursday Trailer Face off" on January 12, 2012, against the upcoming big budget movie G.I. Joe: Retaliation, with Alter Egos winning all categories and tying in one.

The film has grossed over $1 million on VOD.

=== Accolades ===
The film won the Best Narrative Feature at Bay City, Michigan's Hell's Half Mile Film & Music Festival.
