= Jordan Galland =

American singer-songwriter (born 1980)

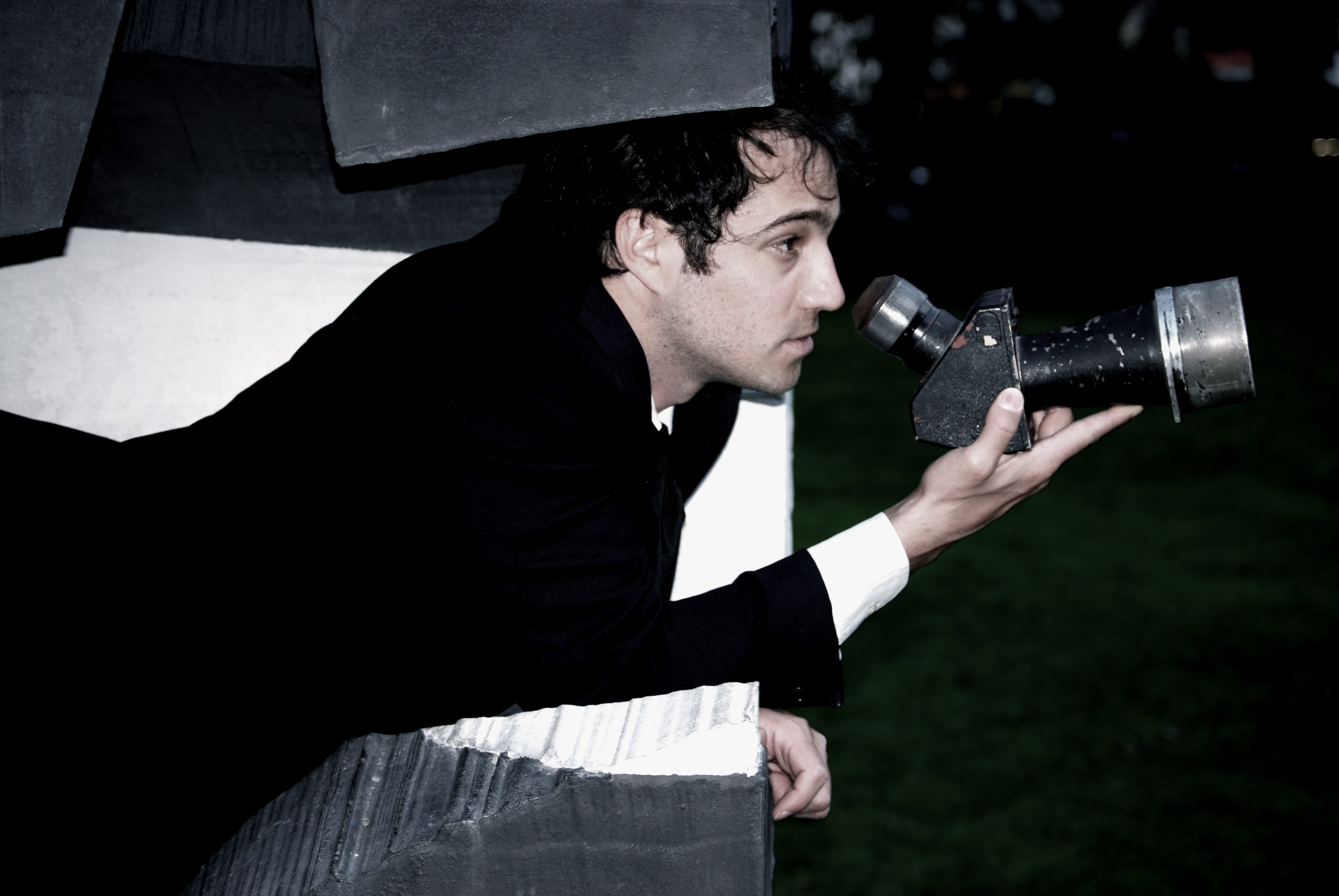
- Galland in 2009

Background information
- Born: 1980 (age 45–46); Farmington, Connecticut, United States.
- Genres: Indie pop, indie rock, folk, country, Burlesque
- Occupations: Filmmaker, singer-songwriter, writer
- Instruments: Guitar, piano, flute
- Years active: 2001–present
- Label: Allido
- Website: Dopoyume.com

Jordan Galland (born 1980) is an American filmmaker and musician based in New York City.

== Early life ==
Born in Farmington, Connecticut, Galland was raised in New York City and graduated in 2002 from New York University, where he studied film, animation and mythology.

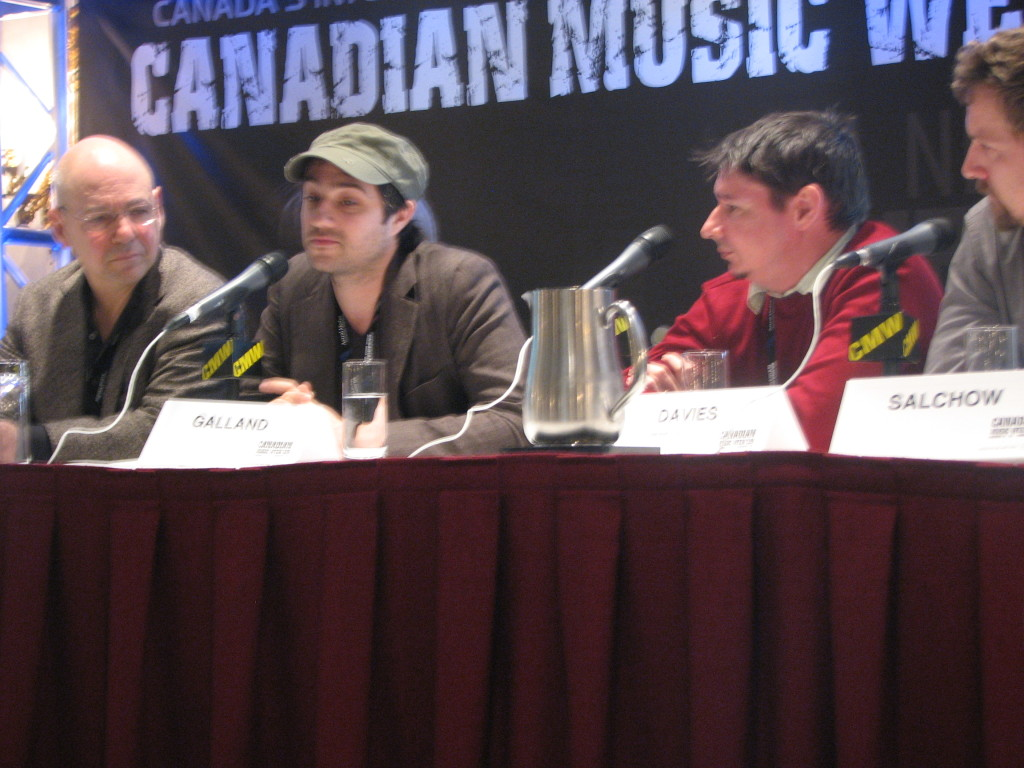
Galland as Panel Member at Canadian Music Week taken by a member of the Canadian Independent Press

== Music career ==
At eighteen, Galland formed the rock band Dopo Yume. Dopo Yume also played shows with musical group Phantom Planet, both contributed musical selections to the popular show The O.C. California, and Dopo Yume's contribution The Secret Show (The Day After Tomorrow).

A later band, Domino, is signed to Mark Ronson's Allido Records label. Additionally, Galland has collaborated with his childhood friend, Sean Lennon, played electric piano on Mark Ronson's album Version and co-wrote tracks on Daniel Merriweather's 2010 Love & War, also released on Allido Records.

In 2006, Jordan Galland began working on a series of solo material with friends and former band-mates David Muller (formerly of the Fiery Furnaces) and Sam Oates for what would ultimately become his solo-debut, "Airbrush." In 2008, Galland and Muller continued to build on the solo-material and co-produced Jordan Galland's sophomore solo release, "Search Party." The album was recorded in Hampton Bays, New York, and mixed by Ron Shaffer at Atlantic West Studios in Brooklyn.

Galland collaborated with Mark Ronson on a video homage to The Legend of Zelda. Galland provided the music for director Sara Ziffs award-winning film Picture Me. She had appeared in an earlier music video of Gallands' "The Princess Waits" In 2011, Galland released an EP via his record label Slush Puppy Music, titled To The Top. The music video for the EP's title track appeared on Glamour.com and AOL's music website, Spinner.com as the Music Video of the Day on May 31, 2011.

Galland did a cover version of "birthday cake" by Cibo Matto

== Film career ==
Galland has contributed to a wide spectrum of movies, ranging from romantic comedy to the genre of Horror film, and Zombie comedy.

Galland's 2005 short film, Smile for the Camera, received an award for best screencraft at the New York Independent International Film and Video Festival in 2005. Galland directed, photographed, and edited the film himself, and wrote the film's theme song and musical score with Sean Lennon and Timo Ellis. An animated music video for his band Domino, Green Umbrella, was shown at multiple film festivals in the U.S., and in Madrid at Alcine37.

Galland has been working on a screen adaptation of Ryu Murakami's Coin Locker Babies, since 1998, in collaboration with Michele Civetta, Peter Kline, and Sean Lennon.

Galland's feature-length debut, Rosencrantz and Guildenstern Are Undead, a vampire film he wrote and directed, was filmed in New York City in December 2007 and stars Ralph Macchio, Jeremy Sisto, and Jake Hoffman. A 2009 Halloween launch party was held at Wooleys in New York. The movie is set to be released in June 2010 through Indican Pictures. This movie is currently playing on Showtime (TV network)

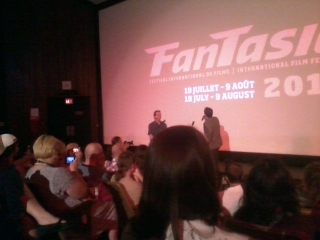
Galland at the Premier of Alter Egos at Fantasia Film Festival in Montreal July 24, 2012

Alter Egos, a movie about super heroes written and directed by Galland, was released in November 2012. It stars Kris Lemche and Danny Masterson, and again involves a collaboration with Sean Lennon, who both stars (as "Electric Death") and contributes the music.

Galland had music contributions in two entries in Tribeca Film Festival 2012; the movie Supporting Characters and also Krysten Ritter's movie, L!fe Happens.

Jordan contributed a song, "Hearts on Ice," to the film Life of Crime.

== Filmography ==
Year	Title	Comments
2004	The Long Weekend	Song: "Central Park"
2004	Knots	Song: "The Postcard"
2005	Smile for the Camera	Writer/actor, won award at prestigious New York International Independent Film and Video Festivalfilm debut of Jemima Kirke
2005	National Lampoon's Adam & Eve	songwriter: "Postcard", "I Can't Say Why", "The Fun")
2005	Green Umbrella	Writer/actor, won numerous awards
2006	Friendly Fire	Co-wrote various songs/ actor
2006	Coven (short)	(score)
2008	Day of the Dead	songwriter "Coolest Boy on Earth"
2008	Coin Locker Babies	Screenwriter
2008	21	song on soundtrack: "Tropical Moonlight", performed by Domino
2008	The Last International Playboy	song on soundtrack: "Brigitte Bardot", performed by Dopo Yume
2009	Rosencrantz and Guildenstern Are Undead	Executive producer, cartoonist, won comedy award at DC Independent Film Festival. Nominated for best production design at European Release at the Strasbourg Film Festival.
2009	The Missing Person	song on soundtrack: "Can't Say Why"
2010	Tiny Furniture	song on soundtrack (writer): "Hide and Seek"
2012	Alter Egos	Director, starring Kris Lemche, Danny Masterson, and long time friend Sean Lennon
2013	Life of Crime	song on soundtrack (writer)
2015	Ava's Possessions	Director, writer
2022	Measure of Revenge	Director, writer

== Discography ==
=== Solo discography ===
- Airbrush (2009)
- Search Party (2010)
- To the Top (2011)
- Wind-up Rabbit (2013)

=== With Dopo Yume ===
- Yumania (2001)
- In the Bedroom (2002)
- True Romance (2003) (with guitar and piano by Sean Lennon, and backing vocals by Bijou Phillips)
- The Secret Show (2006)

=== Other ===
Year	Title	Comments
2006	Friendly Fire by Sean Lennon	co-wrote "Spectacle" and "Falling Out of Love"
2007	Version by Mark Ronson	electric piano on Amy Winehouse's cover of The Zutons' "Valerie" and Lily Allen's cover of the Kaiser Chiefs' "Oh My God"
2010	Love & War by Daniel Merriweather	co-wrote "Cigarettes" and "Live by Night"

== Animation ==
- Galland has done all the animation work in his movies, having studied animation at New York University. In addition he contributed animation (the welcoming birds) in the promotional posters for Plastic Ono Band.
- Galland recently did the animation for the Jewellery ad campaign "you're my Boo" for Waris Ahluwalia's House of Waris.

== Philanthropy ==
- Galland's band Dopo Yume contributed a song to a cd:Mystique, "a Benefit for the AIDS Action."
- Galland's other band Domino had a listing on Mark Ronson Presents Hard Rock, which was distributed exclusively through the Hard Rock Cafe where a portion of the proceeds go to the non-profit organization: Play Pumps (Roundabout PlayPump), that helps to provide clean drinking water to third world countries.
- Galland has contributed music to countless Charity Art shows, including shows that benefit the Nest Foundation, which aids abused children in New York.

== Awards and nominations ==
- Green Umbrella — Best Musical Form, 2006 Da Vinci Film and Video Festival
- Green Umbrella — Best Animated Short, 2006 Black Earth Film Festival
- Green Umbrella — Music Video Award (animation), second place, 2006 Indie Gathering
- Smile for the Camera — ScreenCraft Award (short film), 2005 New York International Independent Film and Video Festival
- Rozencrantz and Guildenstern are Undead – Comedy Award at DC Independent Film Festival,
- 2010 L.A. Comedy Shorts Film Festival Movie Magic Screenwriter Screenplay Competition Semi-finalists: Commercial Affairs
- 2012 Best Narrative feature at Hells Half Mile Festival for Alter Egos
