= Audiokite =

Online market research company

Audiokite Research
- Company type: Private
- Industry: Online services
- Founded: 2014
- Fate: Acquired by ReverbNation
- Headquarters: Queens, New York
- Key people: Alex Jae Mitchell (Co-Founder), Benjamin Sklovsky (Co-Founder)
- Products: Market research Online service provider
- Website: Audiokite.com

Audiokite is an online market research company based in New York, offering consumer research and opinion polling to musicians and labels. Using the Amazon Mechanical Turk service and an internal reviewer filtering process, the service streams music over the internet to U.S.-based music consumers and administers a survey. The results are organized into a report, which determines eligibility for a variety of discounts and opportunities through partnerships with music services including Bandzoogle, New Artist Model, Feature.fm and others.

In an article about data in the modern music industry, Forbes noted that "More and more artists are A/B-testing their music, either on their own or through market research services like Audiokite."

== History ==
The company was founded in 2014 by the musician Alex Jae Mitchell and law student Benjamin Sklovsky, following their previous music venture. Citing the accessible price point, the service earned praise from members of the music technology community following its launch.

In 2015, Audiokite won the SF Music Tech Summit Startup Innovators Challenge.

In 2016, the company pitched in the first Canadian Music Week Startup Launchpad.

== Acquisition ==
Audiokite was acquired by ReverbNation in November 2016 for an undisclosed sum. ReverbNation CEO Mike Doernberg reported the reasoning behind the acquisition was to "deliver more comprehensive and insightful information to promoters of festivals, licensing companies and radio at a much broader scale."
