= Gastón Iungman =

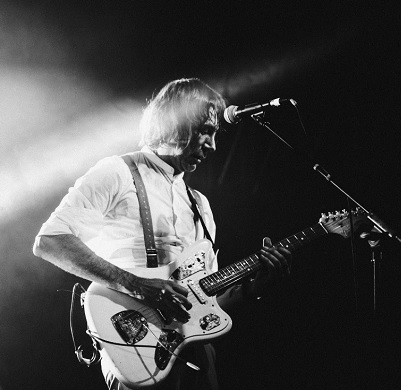

Background information
- Born: December 9, 1972 (age 52); Santa Fe, Argentina
- Origin: Argentina
- Genres: Rock; Experimental music
- Occupation(s): Musician songwriter producer
- Instrument: Guitar
- Labels: In This Area

Gastón Iungman (Santa Fe, December 9, 1972) is an Argentine musician, songwriter and musical producer, known for being one of the founders of the experimental rock group Duchamp Pilot. Iungman was also one of the creators of the theater and visual arts companies Puja! and Voalá, with which he has performed at important festivals and other events around the world. His most remarkable show is Muaré, a mixture of detailed aerial choreographies and rock music that has achieved international success since 2010.

== Career ==
=== Beginnings and Grupo Puja! ===
Iungman was born in 1972 in Santa Fe, Argentina. Since his childhood he became interested in playing the guitar, influenced by classical rock bands such as The Who, Pink Floyd and The Kinks. Between 1989 and 1997 he worked as a guitarist and composer playing for several bands in his natal country.

In 2001, Iungman became the musical director and producer of Grupo Puja!, an experimental theater initiative born in Argentina and currently based in Spain that performs in urban spaces using different disciplines such as theater, dance and music, emphasizing in aerial choreography. The group, which has presented, among others, the shows K@osmos and Dodoland around the world, has won several awards and recognitions throughout its trajectory, among which the First Prize for Excellence in 1999 in Santa Fe, the Audience Award in the fifteenth edition of the FiraTàrrega in 2005 in Catalonia and in the festivals of Espartinas (2005), Loja (2006) and Torrejón de Ardoz (2008).

In 2006 he created the band Beautiful Taste, with which he performed at important events such as the Canadian Music Week in Toronto and the Pukkelpop festival in Belgium. With Beautiful Taste he released the studio album Of Our Cornea, recorded in the Blind Records Studios in Barcelona and mastered in the Fluid Studios in London.

=== Voalá Project, Duchamp Pilot and Muaré ===
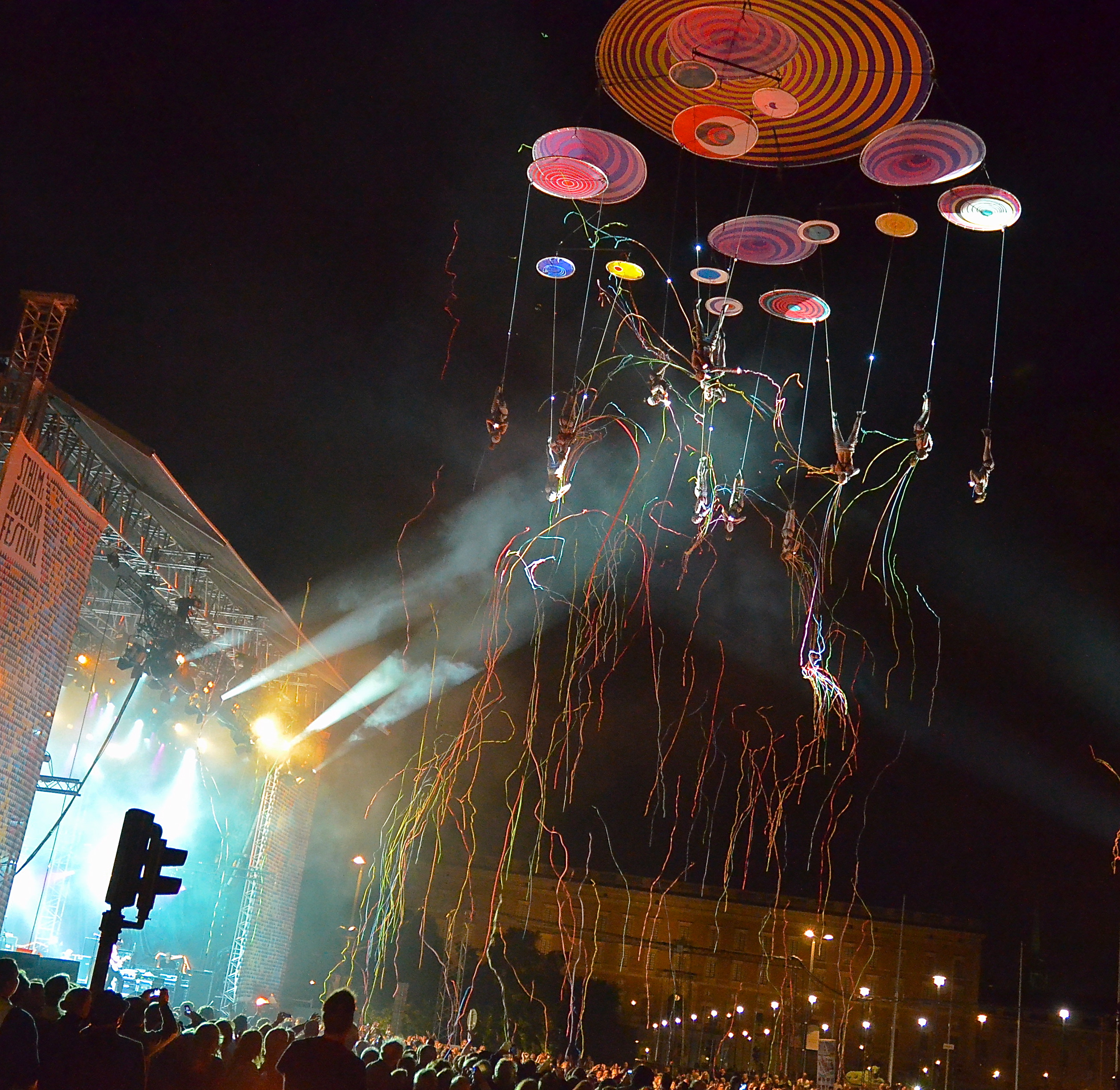
Performance of Muaré in the Stockholms Kulturfestival, 2012.

Iungman, settled down in Europe, founded in 2007 the Voalá Project with the collaboration of the Argentinian plastic artist Roberto Strada. Voalá Project is a theatrical and visual arts company that creates aerial choreographies accompanied by a rock band. In 2010 Iungman produced a visual and musical show called Muaré, inspired in the French artist Marcel Duchamp and his rotorelief technique. The "muaré effect" is an interference pattern that illustrates a principle: two properly combined patterns can generate a different, random pattern.

The performance incorporates a group of acrobats who make random geometric figures in the air, using a crane system that allows the development of artistic activity in the air, accompanied by the music of Duchamp Pilot. The project resides in Spain and has operational bases in England and Argentina, as well as a cast of artists from countries such as Brazil, England, Scotland, France, Greece, Argentina and Spain. The show was performed on the opening night of the twentieth edition of the FiraTàrrega in Catalonia and took part in other important events worldwide shortly after its founding.

People appreciate a concept that's not just seeing a rock band at a concert, this is a multimedia presentation. The audience has their sights set on different parts, in all spaces, that's known as a large-format show.

— Gastón Iungman about Muaré.

The band Duchamp Pilot was created to accompany Voalá's visual spectacle. The name of the band was based on the experimental work of French artist Marcel Duchamp.

In 2014 the group performed at the famous Queen's House in Greenwich and took part in a large number of events in Europe, Asia and Latin America, as well as commemorating the anniversary of the city of Santa Fe, Argentina, in a free concert held on the West Coast before 60,000 people. In 2015 the group was responsible for the opening show of the popular Argentine variety program led by Marcelo Tinelli, Showmatch.

Other venues and events visited during this tour were the Puebla International Theatre Festival, the Cervantino International Festival, La Mercè in Barcelona, the Singapore International Festival of Arts and the Cibeles and Salamanca squares.

After successful performances in Europe, Asia and Mexico in 2017, a year later the group made two shows in the Iberoamerican Theatre Festival of Bogotá, returning after their multitudinous experience in 2015. Also in 2018 they presented the show Voalá Station in England, France, Romania, Poland, Mexico and Taiwan.

Iungman has recorded some albums with the band Duchamp Pilot, in which he presents a fusion of rock, pop, new wave and psychedelic elements. In 2015 the band independently released the single "Erratic Rigor Mortis" and a year later their first feature, Part of the Process. In 2018 a new single by the band was released, titled "Hello, what's going on?, with a videoclip recorded in Bogotá, Colombia.

=== Future projects ===
Two new shows are currently being created and consolidated by Voalá: Sylphes, a ballet developed entirely in the air, and a collaboration with the Spanish theatre company La Fura dels Baus, pioneer of the so-called "friction theatre".

== Major shows ==
- 1999 – El puente que viene
- 1999 – Celebración en las alturas
- 2000 – Santa Fe sin limites
- 2000 – K@osmos
- 2004 – Esthesia
- 2007 – Voala Station
- 2009 – Dodoland
- 2010 – Muaré

== Duchamp Pilot members ==
- Gastón Iungman – guitar
- Gaz Twist – vocals
- Alan Ferguson – bass
- Theo Cuevas – drums

== Discography ==
=== With Beautiful Taste ===
Year	Title	Label
2009	Of Our Cornea	In This Area Records

=== With Duchamp Pilot ===
==== Studio albums ====
Year	Title	Label
2016	Part of the Process	Independent

==== Singles ====
Year	Title	Label
2015	"Erratic Rigor Mortis»	Independent
2018	"¿Hola, qué pasa»	Independent
