= Joanna Wyatt =

Joanna Wyatt may refer to:

- Jo Wyatt, voice actress
- Joanna Wyatt, character in Visions of Joanna played by Geneva Carr
