= Adam Crystal =

American composer, violinist, and keyboardist

Adam Akio Crystal
- Born: California, United States
- Genres: Film score, contemporary classical music
- Occupation: composer
- Instruments: violin, piano, keyboards

Adam Akio Crystal (born in Oakland, California, US) is an American composer, violinist, and keyboardist known for his work in film score and contemporary classical music composition for modern dance and ballet.

== Music career ==
Crystal is a prolific composer of contemporary classical music for modern dance and ballet. His commissioned work has been performed at The Guggenheim's Works & Process, the Vail International Dance Festival, and the Royal New Zealand Ballet In 2016 Crystal's orchestral piece "Rush Hour" premiered at Lincoln Center with choreography by Larry Keigwin and performed by Orchestra of St. Luke's and Paul Taylor Dance Company. In 2017 Crystal was commissioned to create a work with choreographer Ethan Stiefel for the Washington Ballet entitled "Frontier" as part of the John F. Kennedy centennial celebration. It premiered in May 2017 at the Kennedy Center.

Crystal, originally trained as classical violinist, began playing keyboards for the NYC band Dopo Yume and later was the keyboardist for electroclash band Fischerspooner.

== Music ==
=== Ballets ===
- 2011: Trio – choreographed by Larry Keigwin for the Works & Process at the Guggenheim
- 2011: Descent – choreographed by Brian Brooks Moving Company
- 2012: "Final Dress" – choreographed by Larry Keigwin for The Royal New Zealand Ballet
- 2014: "Canvas" – choreographed by Larry Keigwin
- 2015: "Dakini" – choreographed by Ethan Stiefel for Starz mini series Flesh and Bone
- 2015: "Rush Hour" – choreographed by Larry Keigwin for Paul Taylor's PTAMD
- 2016: "Green Mountain" – choreographed by Larry Keigwin for Green Box Arts Festival
- 2017: "Frontier" – choreographed by Ethan Stiefel for The Washington Ballet

=== Film and television ===
- 2002: Slumming It: Myth and Culture on the Bowery
- 2005: Smile for the Camera
- 2009: What's on Your Plate
- 2010: The Park
- 2011: Give Up Tomorrow
- 2012: Beginnings
- 2012: Drivers Wanted
- 2013: Matteo Garrone: The Player
- 2014: Selfie
- 2014: Born to Fly: Elizabeth Streb vs. Gravity
- 2015: This Is Happening
- 2015: Those People
- 2015: Flesh and Bone (original ballet score)
- 2016: So Good To See You
- 2016: Almost Sunrise
- 2017: The Institute
- 2018: The Dawn Wall (SXSW: Winner of SXSW Audience Award)
- 2019: Bonding Season 1
- 2020: Bonding Season 2

== Discography ==
List of albums, with selected chart positions
Title	Album details
Bonding: Music from the Original Netflix Series	Released: July 26, 2019; Label: Lakeshore Records; Formats: Digital download
Frontier	Released: May 15, 2017; Label: Paper Drum Music; Formats: Digital download
Those People (Original Motion Picture Soundtrack)	Released: July 10, 2016; Label: Paper Drum Music; Formats: Digital download
Flesh and Bone: Ballet Music From The Starz original Series	Released: January 15, 2016; Label: Varèse Sarabande; Formats: Digital download
Canvas	Released: September 1, 2014; Label: Paper Drum Music; Formats: Digital download
Final Dress	Released: April 10, 2013; Label: Paper Drum Music; Formats: Digital download

== Awards ==
- 2014 HMMA Nomination for best Documentary Score: Born to Fly: Elizabeth Streb vs Gravity
- 2014 Clio Award for Selfie
