= Thormahlen =

Thormahlen, Thormählen is a Swedish surname. Notable people with the surname include:

- Edmund Thormählen (1865–1946), Swedish sailor
- Erika Thormahlen (born 1983), American actress, writer, and child educator
- Hank Thormahlen (1896–1955), American baseball player
