= After Class (film) =

2019 American comedy-drama film

- Directed by: Daniel Schechter
- Written by: Daniel Schecter
- Produced by: Lawrence Greenberg; Courtenay Johnson; Jordan Kessler
- Starring: Justin Long; Fran Drescher
- Cinematography: Gregory J. Wilson
- Edited by: Joshua Raymond Lee; Daniel Schechter
- Music by: Aaron Esposito
- Production company: Cojo Pictures
- Distributed by: Gravitas Ventures
- Release dates: April 29, 2019 (Tribeca); December 6, 2019 (United States)
- Running time: 93 minutes
- Country: United States
- Language: English

After Class (originally titled Safe Spaces) is a 2019 American comedy-drama film written and directed by Daniel Schechter and starring Justin Long, Kate Berlant, Lynn Cohen, Michael Godere, Fran Drescher and Richard Schiff. It premiered at the 2019 Tribeca Film Festival, and was released in theaters on December 6, 2019.

== Cast ==
- Justin Long as Josh Cohn
- Kate Berlant as Jackie Cohn
- Michael Godere as David Cohn
- Lynn Cohen as Agatha
- Fran Drescher as Diane Cohn
- Richard Schiff as Jeff Cohn
- Silvia Morigi as Caterina
- Becky Ann Baker as Mary
- Tyler Wladis as Ben Cohn
- Samrat Chakrabarti as Terry
- Nic Inglese as Alan
- Emily Ferguson as Jennifer
- Bryce Romero as Peter

== Reception ==
87% of the 15 reviews compiled on Rotten Tomatoes are positive, with an average rating 6.7/10.
