= Dopo Yume =

American rock band

Dopo Yume is an American rock band from New York City. Founded in 1998 by Jordan Galland (lead vocals, guitar), Dopo Yume's lineup rotated regularly. The band's name is derived from the Italian word for "after" (dopo) and the Japanese translation for "dream" (yume).

Their music is a combination of pop and indie rock and has been compared to The Strokes and Pulp.

== History ==
At eighteen years old, Jordan Galland began songwriting for Dopo Yume. With a lineup that included Sean Lennon, Miho Hatori, Yuka Honda and Timo Ellis, the band performed around New York City and toured the United States as an opening act for Rufus Wainwright, Phantom Planet and Cibo Matto.

In 2001, Dopo Yume independently released their debut album, Yumania. That same year, the band was promoted in the film "Lovely & Amazing," when the character Jordan, played by Jake Gyllenhaal, wore a Dopo Yume t-shirt that can be seen in the film's trailer. Dopo Yume is also mentioned in the 2005 film Havoc, starring Anne Hathaway.

In the following years, Dopo Yume released In the Bedroom in 2002 and True Romance, on independent label Slush Puppy Music, in 2003. True Romance includes Jordan Galland on vocals and guitar with Adam Crystal (keyboards), David Muller (bass) and Kevin McGinnis (guitar). Actress and singer Bijou Phillips contributed vocals to the album's track "What Kills Me," and also appeared in the music video for "The Postcard," directed by Michele Civetta.

Following the release of True Romance, Dopo Yume performed as Fischerspooner's backing band for a South American tour. Also in 2004, Dopo Yume performed at the grand opening of Target's Brooklyn, New York location.

The band's final album, The Secret Show, was released after Dopo Yume stopped playing live; its title is a tongue in cheek reference to that fact. Galland and Sean Lennon co-wrote the album's title track, which was featured on Episode 20, Season 3 of the hit television show, The O.C.

Dopo Yume disbanded in 2005 when Galland went on to start the band Domino, with Domino Kirke and Dopo Yume member David Muller.

Many of Dopo Yume's members have gone on to perform with other acts, including Caveman, Morningwood, The Ghost of a Saber Tooth Tiger, The Interpreters, Netherlands, or to pursue solo careers.

== Awards and recognition ==
In 2003, Dopo Yume was selected as a semi-finalist for AOL's "First Break," Competition, wherein local bands competed for a record deal with Atlantic Records.

== Past band members ==
- Jordan Galland – vocals, guitar
- Sean Lennon - bass drums, guitar
- Yuka Honda – bass
- Miho Hatori - drums
- Stefan Marolachakis – drums
- Lissy Trullie – guitar
- Robert Schwartzman - guitar
- Smokey Hormel – guitar
- Brendan Fowler – drums
- Peter Yanowitz – drums
- Adam Crystal – keyboards
- Herschal Gaer – bass
- Timo Ellis – drums, guitars
- Sam Axelrod - guitar

== Discography ==
Year	Title	Label
2001	Yumania	Self-released
2002	In the Bedroom	Self-released
2003	True Romance	Slush Puppy Music
2005	The Secret Show	Slush Puppy Music

== Music videos ==
Year	Title	Director
2003	"The Postcard"	Michele Civetta
