= Just Deal =

- Created by: Jessica Klein; Thomas W. Lynch
- Starring: Brian T. Skala; Erika Thormahlen; Shedrack Anderson III; John L. Adams (season 1)
- Theme music composer: Todd Haberman
- Composers: Reg Powell; Andrew R. Powell; Chris Powell
- Countries of origin: United States; Canada
- Original language: English
- No. of seasons: 3
- No. of episodes: 39

Production
- Camera setup: Single-camera
- Running time: 22 minutes
- Production companies: Lynch Entertainment; GEP Productions

Original release
- Network: NBC
- Release: September 23, 2000 – September 7, 2002

Just Deal is a comedy-drama series that aired Saturday mornings on NBC as a part of the network's TNBC lineup. The series premiered on September 23, 2000 and ended on September 7, 2002.

== Premise ==
The show revolves around Dylan Roberts, an ordinary teenager living in the suburbs outside of Seattle, whose older brother Mike is the star quarterback of the high-school football team. Dylan's best friend Jermaine Greene is a biracial, highly educated teen who wants to go to Harvard someday. They spend a lot of time together until Ashley Gordon, the new girl in town, takes up most of Dylan's attention. Together they add up to a strong group of friends.

== Production ==
The show was the first on TNBC to use the single-camera format (i.e. not in front of a live audience and with no laugh track). Another single-camera show, Sk8, was created soon after, but the TNBC lineup, including Just Deal, was soon canceled in favor NBC leasing its Saturday morning lineup to Discovery Kids in fall 2002. The show later aired briefly on Noggin's The N programming block from 2003 to 2004.

== Cast ==
=== Main cast ===
- Brian T. Skala as Dylan Roberts
- Erika Thormahlen as Ashley "Ash" Gordon
- Shedrack Anderson III as Jermaine Greene
- John L. Adams as Mr. Peña (Season 1)

=== Recurring cast ===
- Will Sanderson as Mike Roberts Jr.
- Eileen Pedde as Coleen Roberts
- Eric Keenleyside as Mike Roberts Sr.
- Alison Matthews as Emily Gordon
- Fiona Scott as Naomi Esterbrook
- Kandyse McClure as Kim
- Jewel Staite as Laurel
- Michael P. Northey as Benny
- Parker Jay as Vijal
- Antonio Cupo as Josh
- David Paetkau as Hunter Kerrigan

== Episodes ==
=== Season 1 (2000) ===
| No. overall | No. in season | Title | Directed by | Written by | Original release date | Prod. code |
|---|---|---|---|---|---|---|
| 1 | 1 | "Incoming" | James Marshall | Jessica Klein & Thomas W. Lynch | September 23, 2000 | 63951 |
| 2 | 2 | "Homecoming" | Nicholas Kendall | Thomas W. Lynch | October 7, 2000 | 63952 |
| 3 | 3 | "State of Emergency" "The Unusual Suspect" | Bill Corcoran | Julie Nathanson | October 14, 2000 | 63953 |
| 4 | 4 | "The Right Question" | Anthony Atkins | Kevin Arnovitz | October 21, 2000 | 63954 |
| 5 | 5 | "Totally Random" | Bill Corcoran | Thomas W. Lynch | October 28, 2000 | 63955 |
| 6 | 6 | "One for the Road" | Bill Gereghty | Thomas W. Lynch | November 11, 2000 | 63956 |
| 7 | 7 | "The Tutor" | Bill Corcoran | Elizabeth Craft & Sarah Fain | November 18, 2000 | 63957 |
| 8 | 8 | "Have Your Cake" | Bill Gereghty | Julie Nathanson | November 25, 2000 | 63958 |
| 9 | 9 | "Getting Inked" | James Marshall | Darryl Lemont Wharton-Rigby | December 2, 2000 | 63959 |
| 10 | 10 | "Joyride" | Bill Gereghty | Thomas W. Lynch | December 9, 2000 | 63960 |
| 11 | 11 | "With the Band" | James Marshall | Jessica Klein | December 16, 2000 | 63961 |
| 12 | 12 | "Washed Up" | Alan Simmonds | Mark Palmer | December 23, 2000 | 63962 |
| 13 | 13 | "Uncovered" | Patrick Williams | Jessica Klein & Thomas W. Lynch | December 30, 2000 | 63963 |

=== Season 2 (2001) ===
| No. overall | No. in season | Title | Directed by | Written by | Original release date | Prod. code |
|---|---|---|---|---|---|---|
| 14 | 1 | "Second Date" | Patrick Williams | Jessica Klein | September 8, 2001 | 63964 |
| 15 | 2 | "Picture Day" | Patrick Williams | Kelly Senecal | September 22, 2001 | 63975 |
| 16 | 3 | "Low Fidelity" | James Marshall | Kelly Senecal | September 29, 2001 | 63965 |
| 17 | 4 | "School Prayer" | Patrick Williams | Thomas W. Lynch | October 6, 2001 | 63966 |
| 18 | 5 | "Painted Love" | Anthony Atkins | Julie Nathanson | October 13, 2001 | 63967 |
| 19 | 6 | "The Perfect Mix" | James Marshall | Story by : Jessica Klein; Teleplay by : Julie Nathanson | October 20, 2001 | 63968 |
| 20 | 7 | "Home Sweet Home" | Anthony Atkins | Sam Kass | October 27, 2001 | 63969 |
| 21 | 8 | "Motel Hell" | Bill Gereghty | Stephen Langford | November 3, 2001 | 63970 |
| 22 | 9 | "Urban Legend" | James Marshall | Thomas W. Lynch | November 10, 2001 | 63971 |
| 23 | 10 | "Women's Work" | Bill Gereghty | Story by : Jessica Klein; Teleplay by : Stephen Langford & Julie Nathanson | November 17, 2001 | 63972 |
| 24 | 11 | "Under Suspicion" | Anthony Atkins | Darryl Lemont Wharton-Rigby | November 24, 2001 | 63973 |
| 25 | 12 | "Dojo Mojo" | Bill Gereghty | Thomas W. Lynch | December 1, 2001 | 63974 |
| 26 | 13 | "Passages" | Bill Gereghty | Jessica Klein & Thomas W. Lynch | December 8, 2001 | 63976 |

=== Season 3 (2002) ===
| No. overall | No. in season | Title | Directed by | Written by | Original release date | Prod. code |
|---|---|---|---|---|---|---|
| 27 | 1 | "Flashback" | Anthony Atkins | Jessica Klein & Thomas W. Lynch | May 4, 2002 | 64551 |
| 28 | 2 | "Condomania" | Bill Gereghty | Stephen Langford | May 11, 2002 | 64552 |
| 29 | 3 | "Up Too Late" | Matt Hastings | Julie Nathanson | May 18, 2002 | 64553 |
| 30 | 4 | "The Little Tramp" | Kelly Senecal | Kelly Senecal | May 25, 2002 | 64554 |
| 31 | 5 | "Dog Day Afternoon" | James Marshall | Jim Kramer | June 1, 2002 | 64555 |
| 32 | 6 | "Conscientious Objections" | Bethany Rooney | Thomas W. Lynch | June 8, 2002 | 63982 |
| 33 | 7 | "Happy Medium" | Bill Gereghty | Stephen Langford & Julie Nathanson | June 15, 2002 | 63983 |
| 34 | 8 | "I Never" | Anthony Atkins | Stephen Langford & Julie Nathanson | June 22, 2002 | 63984 |
| 35 | 9 | "Over the Net" | Martin Wood | Thomas W. Lynch | June 29, 2002 | 63985 |
| 36 | 10 | "Last Dance" | Bill Gereghty | Story by : Jessica Klein; Teleplay by : Stephen Langford & Julie Nathanson | July 13, 2002 | 63987 |
| 37 | 11 | "Looking Back" | Kelly Senecal | Stephen Langford & Julie Nathanson | July 20, 2002 | 63989 |
| 38 | 12 | "Yearbook" | James Marshall | Jessica Klein & Thomas W. Lynch | July 27, 2002 | 63988 |
| 39 | 13 | "Animal House Rules" | Peter DeLuise | Story by : Stephen Langford; Teleplay by : Julie Nathanson & Kelly Senecal | September 7, 2002 | 63986 |
