= Departure Festival =

Canadian industry conference and music festival

Departure Festival + Conference
- Locations: Toronto, Ontario
- Country: Canada
- Founded: 1981

The Departure Festival + Conference, formerly known as Canadian Music Week, is an industry conference and music festival held in Toronto, Ontario, Canada.

The event announced its new name in November 2024, noting that it will expand its focus to include art, comedy, technology, film and fashion events.

== History ==
The event is an annual four-day music and media conference that began in 1981. It is one of Canada's largest and most influential conferences, drawing top industry professionals from around the world. The event is designed to stimulate the exchange of market intelligence, increase dialogue, and provide networking opportunities.

The conference includes a variety of activities, such as conferences, award shows, and one of Canada's biggest "New Music" festivals. The festival features performances by emerging and established artists at venues ranging from bars and halls, to clothing stores and cafés.

It draws in significant numbers of A&R representatives. Emerging new bands use the festival as an opportunity to be spotted by these representatives.

In January 2017, Jim Beam along with Canadian Music Week Canada launched the "Jim Beam Make History Talent Search", a talent search program designed to discover the next big Canadian music star.

Canadian Music Week has become a platform for the Canadian music industry, consistently bringing together more than 3,000 music industry professionals for the week's events. It is a multi-day Canadian music and media event that helps to increase the visibility of emerging artists and encourage collaboration among industry professionals.

In June 2024 festival founder Neill Dixon announced his retirement and the sale of Canadian Music Week to a partnership led by Randy Lennox, former CEO of Universal Music Canada. The partnership is between Lennox's Canadian production house LOFT Entertainment and US-based sports & real estate company Oak View Group.

== Notable participants ==
Notable speakers and performers who have been a part of the event include:

- Slash, celebrity interview artist
- Gene Simmons, celebrity interview artist
- David Foster, celebrity interview record producer
- Dennis DeYoung, celebrity interview artist/songwriter
- Chuck D, keynote speaker artist/record producer
- Stereos, pop-rock band
- Alan Parsons, keynote speaker British record producer
- Hollowphonic, an ambient, post-rock unit
- Seymour Stein, president of Sire records
- Trapt, a nu metal rock outfit
- Public Enemy, hip hop group
- Cassius Khan, Indian classical musician; The Ghazal Tabla Wizard
- Wolfmother, rock band
- MENEW, indie rock band
- The Exies, an indie rock band
- Glen Ballard, producer
- Don Was, producer
- Sturle Dagsland, Norwegian artist
- Mark Hudson, producer
- Mathew Knowles, keynote speaker – World Music Entertainment C.E.O.
- Sir George Martin, producer
- Jordan Galland, panel member, director/musician
- Gastón Iungman, rock musician and producer;
- Bullmoose, indie rock band.

== Halls of fame ==
=== Canadian Indies Hall of Fame ===
CMW honors important independent and alternative artists with its annual "Canadian Indies Hall of Fame" program. Artists who have been inducted into the Hall of Fame include Parachute Club, The Pursuit of Happiness, Martha and the Muffins, D.O.A. and Rough Trade.

=== Canadian Music Industry Hall of Fame ===
Canadian Music Week hosts the Canadian Music Industry Hall of Fame.

In 2008, singer-songwriter Alanis Morissette was inducted into the Canadian Music Industry Hall of Fame.

In 2016, Andy Kim, Rob Steele, André Ménard and Alain Simard were made inductees.

== Featured Cultural Spotlight performances ==
- 2010 Spotlight on India – Rock Showcase featured a number of South-Asian-Canadian acts such as J'sin who performed tracks from his Fatlab's produced first album, Born.

== Canadian Music Fest ==
Since 2009 Canadian Music Week has referred to the festival component of the event as Canadian Music Fest, which it calls "Canada's largest new music festival".

== Startup Launchpad ==
In 2016, CMW hosted its first annual Startup Launchpad event, a pitch competition for startups in the music industry. Seven startups were selected to pitch their business to potential investors and a judging panel including Michael Wekerle and Ted Cohen. The first finalists of this event were Mugatunes, an intercollegiate music sharing site, Audiokite Research, a market research company for musicians, Mission Control, a music management platform, Aybo, Trebba, and Notetracks, a music collaboration app.

== Canadian Radio Music Awards ==
In 2016, the CMW launched an award show, called the Canadian Radio Music Awards. The show, similar to the Juno Awards, recognized and celebrated Canadian music artists. The award show has not been held since 2018.

== See also ==
- List of festivals in Canada
- Music of Canada
