= John Ventimiglia =

American actor

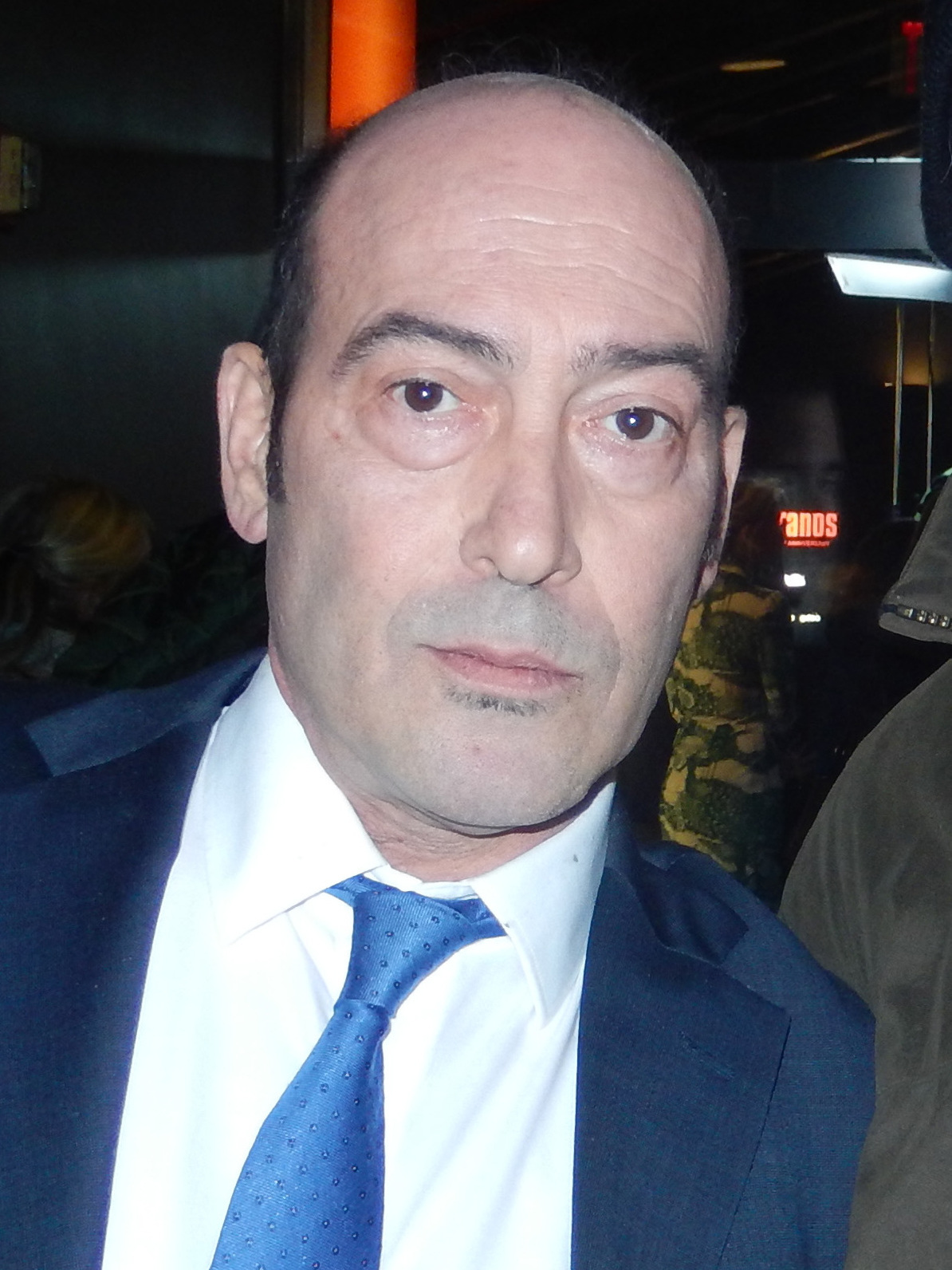
- Ventimiglia in 2019
- Born: July 17, 1963 (age 63); New York City, U.S.
- Occupation: Actor
- Years active: 1985–present
- Spouse: Belinda Cape (m. 1991)
- Children: 2

John Ventimiglia (/vɛntɪˈmiːljə/, Italian: [ventiˈmiʎʎa]; born July 17, 1963) is an American actor. He portrayed Artie Bucco in the HBO television series The Sopranos and had a recurring role as Dino Arbogast, an Organized Crime Control Bureau Chief for the NYPD, on the American police procedural/drama series Blue Bloods on CBS.

== Early life ==
Ventimiglia was born in Ridgewood, Queens to Sicilian immigrants from Castellammare del Golfo, Sicily and grew up in Teaneck, New Jersey. Ventimiglia grew up speaking Sicilian at home with his parents and still speaks fluent Sicilian to this day. He graduated from Teaneck High School in 1981 where he played on the football team. In the 1980s he lived in the East Village with Michael Imperioli, who would later play Christopher Moltisanti on The Sopranos.

== Career ==
Ventimiglia is most notable for portraying Artie Bucco, owner of restaurant Vesuvio and childhood friend of main character Tony Soprano friend in the HBO show The Sopranos. He appeared in 37 episodes, running from 1999 to 2007.

Ventimiglia has had parts in feature films such as Cop Land, Jesus' Son, The Iceman, The Funeral, The Wannabe, and Mickey Blue Eyes and has appeared in numerous television shows including Law & Order and NYPD Blue. He also made a brief cameo in the made-for-television movie Gotti.

In August 2007, Ventimiglia and the David Amram quartet presented a musical and oral homage to sociologist C. Wright Mills and beat author Jack Kerouac. They continued with a Kerouac show in Denmark in autumn of 2007. Ventimiglia starred in the comedy Rosencrantz and Guildenstern are Undead (2008), playing the role of Theo Horace. In 2008, he played a small role as a police officer in Notorious. In 2011, he appeared as "Weinstein" in the film Flypaper.

In 2011, he starred in a small indie film, PONIES. In 2012, he guest starred in the short lived CBS series Made in Jersey. In 2012, he starred as General Humberto Delgado in the Portuguese film Operation Autumn, a film about Delgado's brutal assassination in Spain by the Portuguese fascists.

In 2016, he played Harry Magarac on the episode of Elementary, entitled "Murder Ex Machina", first aired on January 21, 2016. He also did narration for the Nat Geo television documentary series Inside the American Mob.

== Legal issues ==
On May 24, 2001, actor Vincent Gallo successfully sued Ventimiglia for assault and battery. The New York Supreme Court decided the case in Gallo's favor in Gallo v. Ventimiglia (2001).

In May 2006, Ventimiglia was arraigned on drunken driving, drug possession, and other charges. Police officers allegedly spotted Ventimiglia weaving in and out of traffic, and tested his blood alcohol content at 0.12 (above the legal limit of .08), while also finding a zip-lock bag with cocaine residue in his possession. He was released on bail. In June, Ventimiglia pleaded guilty to drunk driving; he was fined $500 and had his license suspended for 90 days. His drug possession charges were dropped by prosecutors as part of a plea deal.

== Personal life ==
Ventimiglia is divorced from his wife, Belinda, with whom he has a daughter and a granddaughter. His daughter, Odele Cape, died in 2023 two months after giving birth to her daughter and Ventimiglia's first grandchild.

He is a lifelong New York Mets fan.

== Filmography ==
=== Film ===
Year	Title	Role	Notes
1992	Swoon	Prison Guard	
1994	Hand Gun	Angel	
1994	The Cowboy Way	Uniformed Cop	
1994	Bullets over Broadway	Waterfront Hood	
1994	Post Cards from America	Driver	
1995	Party Girl	Tough Guy	
1995	Angela	Andrew	
1995	Low	Terry 'Lullaby' Fairlane	
1995	Stonewall	Tea Dance Bouncer	
1996	I Shot Andy Warhol	John Who Likes Lesbians	
1996	Girls Town	Eddie	
1996	Trees Lounge	Johnny	
1996	Under the Bridge	Unknown	
1996	The Funeral	Sali	
1996	Extreme Measures	Detective Manning	
1997	Arresting Gena	Joey / Cop	
1997	Kicked in the Head	Man At Party	
1997	Cop Land	Officer V	
1997	Niagara, Niagara	Doug	
1997	Sue Lost in Manhattan	Larry	
1998	No Looking Back	Tony, Pizza Guy	
1998	Claire Dolan	Newark Cab Driver	
1998	Louis & Frank	Alvin	
1999	On the Run	Louie Salazar	
1999	Row Your Boat	Anton	
1999	Mickey Blue Eyes	Johnny Graziosi	
1999	Jesus' Son	McInnes	
2001	Series 7: The Contenders	Dispatch Operator	
2001	The Boys of Sunset Ridge	Hank Bartlowski at 33	
2001	Plan B	Raymond Pelagi	
2002	Personal Velocity: Three Portraits	Narrator	Voice
2005	The War Within	Gabe	
2005	The Notorious Bettie Page	Photographer	Uncredited
2005	The Collection	Various	
2007	The Lovebirds	John Constantin	
2009	The Missing Person	Hero	
2009	Notorious	Detective Farelli	
2009	Rosencrantz and Guildenstern Are Undead	Theo Horace / Horatio	
2009	The Hungry Ghosts	James	
2011	Flypaper	Weinstein	
2011	Violet & Daisy	Man #1	
2011	Ponies	Drazen	
2012	Alter Egos	Shrink	
2012	The Iceman	Mickey Scicoli	
2012	BMW: Bombay's Most Wanted	Unknown	
2012	Operation Autumn	Humberto Delgado	
2013	The Cold Lands	Jackson	
2013	Blood Ties	Detective Valenti	
2014	Glass Chin	Jack Marchiano	
2014	Tim Maia	Cab Driver	Credited as John Vee
2015	Houses	Unknown	
2015	The Wannabe	Arthur	
2015	Ava's Possessions	Father Merrino	
2016	The Phenom	'Red' Briles	
2016	Money Monster	A Team Leader	
2018	Cabaret Maxime	Veebie	
2019	Human Capital	David	
2020	Haymaker	Javier	
2023	Ex-Husbands	Sipple	

=== Television ===
Year	Title	Role	Notes
1994–2010	Law & Order	Various	5 episodes
1995	Homicide: Life on the Street	Manuel	1 episode
1995	As the World Turns	Chuck	1 episode
1996–1999	New York Undercover	Peter Vitti / Lenny	2 episodes
1997	NYPD Blue	Michael Zorzi	1 episode
1997	Feds	Alfonse Bucco	1 episode
1997	C-16: FBI	Nick Tulli	6 episodes
1999–2007	The Sopranos	Artie Bucco	37 episodes
2000	King of the World	Angelo Dundee	TV movie
2000	Prince Street	Unknown	2 episodes
2000–2001	Level 9	Justin Malik	3 episodes
2007	Six Degrees	Jimmy McLean	3 episodes
2007	CSI: Crime Scene Investigation	Stanley Vespucci	1 episode
2007	Law & Order: Criminal Intent	Ronald Hawk	1 episode
2008	Backdrop NYC	Justin	Documentary series
2009	White Collar	Burrelli	1 episode
2010	Mercy	Damiano	3 episodes
2011–2014	Blue Bloods	Dino Arbogast	16 episodes
2012	NYC 22	Inspector Carl Woods	1 episode
2012	Person of Interest	Christopher Zambrano	1 episode
2012	Made in Jersey	Ed Koeneke	1 episode
2013	Law & Order: Special Victims Unit	Bobby Navarro	1 episode
2014	Believe	Steve	1 episode
2014–2015	The Good Wife	Detective Gary Prima	5 episodes
2015	The Blacklist	Warden Ramsey Mills	1 episode
2016	Elementary	Harry Magarac	1 episode
2016	Vinyl	Lou Meshejian	1 episode
2016	Bull	Dormit	1 episode
2017	The Breaks	Orson Bainbridge	2 episodes
2018	Crashing	Raymond	1 episode
2018–2019	Jessica Jones	Detective Eddy Costa	14 episodes
2019	At Home with Amy Sedaris	Sugar Man	1 episode
2019	Reprisal	Tolly	1 episode
2020	Joe Pera Talks with You	Himself	1 episode
2022	Gaslit	John Sirica	3 episodes
