= Supporting Characters =

- Promotional Poster
- Directed by: Daniel Schechter
- Written by: Daniel Schechter; Tarik Lowe
- Produced by: Alex A. Ginzburg; Tim Duff; Adam Der Aris
- Starring: Alex Karpovsky; Tarik Lowe; Arielle Kebbel; Melonie Diaz; Sophia Takal
- Cinematography: Richard P. Ulivella
- Edited by: Daniel Schechter
- Music by: Jordan Galland
- Production company: Let It Play
- Distributed by: Tribeca Film
- Release date: April 20, 2012 (Tribeca Film Festival)
- Country: United States
- Language: English
- Box office: $4,917

Supporting Characters is a film directed by Daniel Schechter. It was written by Schechter and Tarik Lowe. It had its world premiere at the Tribeca Film Festival on April 20, 2012.

== Plot ==
The film follows two New York film editors, Nick and Darryl, trying to balance their love lives while reworking a film and maintaining their friendship despite their work differences. Nick, who is engaged to Amy, considers having an affair with Jamie, the star of the film he and Darryl are editing, while Darryl has troubles with his bossy and demanding girlfriend Liana.

== Cast ==
- Alex Karpovsky as Nick
- Tarik Lowe as Darryl
- Arielle Kebbel as Jamie
- Sophia Takal as Amy
- Melonie Diaz as Liana
- Mike Landry as Mike
- Kevin Corrigan as Adrian
- Lena Dunham as Alexa
- Sebastian Sozzi as Sebastian

== Production ==
Dan Schechter: "When I started, I just wanted to make a film, a really good film, for under $50,000, and that was the main goal (and we ended up incredibly close to that number). The editing thing was an arbitrary choice at first. This film was about two best buds and their respective relationships, and we just needed to give them some career to do together so they could bitch at work to one another. So I chose editing because I had some good experiences I could draw from, and perhaps we could get away with not being a "film about making films” because, really, that storyline is about specifically being an editor and what that day job is like."

Schechter and Lowe based the semi-autobiographical film on incidents from their personal lives, crafting a simultaneously offbeat and naturalistic New York story. Schechter's own experience as an editor is evident in the script, which blends intimate relationships with humorous details of life in an editing room. Schechter had a number of his indie movie associates perform in this movie, such as Melonie Diaz. Lena Dunham and Alex Karpovsky, both of Girls fame also starred. The film was shot in 12 days.

== Reception ==
On the review aggregator website Rotten Tomatoes, 86% of 7 critics' reviews are positive. Metacritic, which uses a weighted average, assigned the film a score of 62 out of 100, based on 7 critics, indicating "generally favorable" reviews.

Jason Bailey of DVD Talk had the following evaluation to make: "Lowe and director Daniel Schechter's script is fast and witty—the Nick/Darryl duets (which make up a good chunk of the picture) have a sharp, conversational style and tempo." Vanessa Martinez, a critic with Indie Wire, discusses the powerful rapport of the main characters of the film: "you will enjoy witnessing this duo’s connection, and even co-dependence to a degree."

Brandon Harris, a reporter with Filmmaker, wrote that "i was prepared to hate it. Excited to, even. It charmed the pants right off me." Jason Guerrasio of Fandango wrote that "director Daniel Schechter has a witty sense of humor that's delivered perfectly by leads."

== Soundtrack ==
Drawing on his friends in the indie movie business, the soundtrack is by Schechter's friend indie director and musician Jordan Galland. In exchange for doing the soundtrack for the movie, Schecter edited the trailer for Alter Egos, Jordan Galland’s movie.
