= Ava's Possessions =

2015 film by Jordan Galland

- Theatrical release poster
- Directed by: Jordan Galland
- Written by: Jordan Galland
- Produced by: Maren Olson; Carlos Velazquez; Jordan Galland; Doug Weiser
- Starring: Louisa Krause; Whitney Able; Deborah Rush; William Sadler; Wass Stevens; Zachary Booth; Dan Fogler; Carol Kane; Lou Taylor Pucci
- Cinematography: Adrian Peng Correia
- Edited by: Jordan Galland; Daniel Hahn
- Music by: Sean Lennon
- Production companies: Ravenous Films; Traction Media; Off Hollywood Pictures
- Distributed by: Orion Pictures; Momentum Pictures
- Release dates: April 26, 2015 (Dead by Dawn Horror Film Festival); March 4, 2016 (United States)
- Running time: 89 minutes
- Country: United States
- Language: English

Ava's Possessions is a 2015 American supernatural comedy horror film written and directed by Jordan Galland. Louisa Krause stars as the titular Ava, a young woman that must learn how to put her life together after a demon is exorcised from her body. The film had its world premiere at the Dead by Dawn Horror Film Festival on April 26, 2015.

== Plot ==
A priest (John Ventimiglia) successfully completes an exorcism on Ava (Louisa Krause), who was possessed by the demon Naphula for 28 days. During the possession, Ava caused serious emotional and physical damage, resulting in the loss of her job, friends, and boyfriend, as well as potential jail time.

Her parents (William Sadler and Deborah Rush), sister Jillian (Whitney Able), and Jillian's fiancée Roger (Zachary Booth) are all concerned for her. They push her into accepting a plea deal to avoid jail time or commitment in a facility for troubled ex-possessed people. Instead, she is required to complete a rehabilitation program for the recently exorcised. The final test will involve the participants wearing a necklace that invites the demon back into their body. Pulling the necklace off and rejecting the demon will prove their ability deter future possessions and warrant graduation from the program.

The program is led by Tony (Wass Stevens), a gruff man that warns Ava to take things seriously, as failing to do so would make repossessions more likely to happen. At one meeting Ava meets Hazel (Annabelle Dexter-Jones), a fellow ex-possessed person that wants her demon to return since she enjoyed its presence.

Ava attempts to piece together her missing 28 days to figure out why she was possessed, whom she killed and why. Her family is of little help and seems to be hiding something. An engraved watch leads her to Ben (Lou Taylor Pucci), who tells her that it belonged to his father. Certain that Ben's father is dead because of her, Ava lies to Ben about how she found the watch.

Lonely and confused as to what exactly caused her to become possessed, Ava agrees to help Hazel's demon return, causing Hazel to be committed and leaving a tattoo on Ava's neck, which Tony discovers. He throws her out of the program, as the tattoo makes it easy for the demon to return. Ava's family chooses to commit her but Ava manages to gain a lead on Ben's father via a prostitute. The prostitute is murdered before she can tell Ava anything.

She is then recaptured and is put in a car with Roger, who is to take her to the asylum. However instead of taking her to the facility, Roger reveals he murdered the prostitute. Ava discovers that while she did kill Ben's father, it was in self-defense. He was a hitman hired by Roger to murder her. Roger wanted to hide the fact that Ava, Roger and the prostitute had a sexual encounter.

Roger drives Ava to Tony's now empty classroom, where he forces her to put on the necklace and bring back Naphula. While she’s possessed, Roger confesses his crimes, captured by the facility's security cameras. Ava suppresses Naphula and uses its abilities to capture Roger. She then rips off the necklace.

Ava rebuilds her life and works with Tony in the facility office. She senses that Naphula is near and accidentally scatters old folders containing profiles of former possessed people. She discovers her mother was also possessed by Naphula, hinting that their bloodline is predisposed to possessions. Ava then recalls seeing a tattoo on Jillian's neck, similar to the one she received during the ritual. She realizes that Jillian had arranged the possession to avoid getting possessed herself. Furious, Ava screams. The office door swings open, showing the shadow of Naphula.

== Cast ==
- Louisa Krause as Ava
- Annabelle Dexter-Jones as Hazel
- Wass Stevens as Tony
- Whitney Able as Jillian
- Lou Taylor Pucci as Ben
- Carol Kane as Talia
- William Sadler as Bernard
- Alysia Reiner as Noelle
- Dan Fogler as JJ Samson
- Joel de la Fuente as Escobar
- John Ventimiglia as Father Merrino
- Deborah Rush as Joanna
- Zachary Booth as Roger
- Geneva Carr as Darlene
- Jemima Kirke as Ivy
- Olivia Anton as little demon girl

== Reception ==
Critical reception for Ava's Possessions has been mixed and the film holds a rating of 69% on Rotten Tomatoes, based on 16 reviews. Entertainment Weekly wrote a mostly favorable review, criticizing it for having too many plot threads in one movie but stating that "Krause’s deadpan wit, coupled with the inspired scenes at Spirit Possessions Anoymous, make Ava’s Possessions a fun, fresh take on a genre staple." Bloody Disgusting shared a similar opinion and noted that while the film was flawed, it had good acting and was "still a unique film that deserves a watch to see that not every possession film has to be told the same way." The New York Times was more critical, writing that "Though at times pleasingly quirky, the story is too slackly written and insipidly photographed to entertain."
