= Waffles + Mochi =

American children's cooking television series

- Promotional poster
- Created by: Erika Thormahlen; Jeremy Konner
- Directed by: Jeremy Konner
- Country of origin: United States
- Original language: English
- No. of seasons: 1
- No. of episodes: 10 + 1 special

Production
- Executive producers: Erika Thormahlen; Jeremy Konner; Tonia Davis; Priya Swaminathan; Alex Braverman; Barack Obama; Michelle Obama
- Production companies: Hello Erika Productions; Konner Productions; Higher Ground Productions; Netflix Studios

Original release
- Network: Netflix
- Release: March 16, 2021

Waffles + Mochi (pronounced Waffles and Mochi) is an American children's cooking musical comedy puppet television series. Produced by Higher Ground Productions with Michelle Obama as executive producer, it was released on Netflix on March 16, 2021.

Three companion books were also released in 2021: Follow That Food! by Christy Webster and Sarah Rebar, Pickle Party by Frank Berrio and Sarah Rebar, and Waffles + Mochi: Get Cooking! by Yewande Komolafe.

On November 23, 2021, Netflix released a special holiday episode titled "Waffles + Mochi's Holiday Feast". On October 17, 2022, Netflix released a spinoff series titled Waffles + Mochi's Restaurant.

== Premise ==
Waffles (whose dad is a frozen waffle and mom is a yeti) and Mochi (a mochi ball) are two friends that wish they could become chefs but live in the land of frozen food where everything is made of ice. They're hired as employees of a grocery store owned by Michelle Obama. Through the series they encounter tasks they need to accomplish and travel around the world on Magicart where they meet chefs, other food experts, and learn to eat and make different kinds of foods in each episode.

== Cast ==
- Michelle Zamora as Waffles
- Piotr Michael as Mochi (voice)
- Russ Walko as Mochi (puppeteer)
- Jonathan Kidder as Busy Bee, the store manager
- Diona Elise Burnett as Magicart and Steve the Mop
- Lyric Lewis as Baker
- Taleia Gilliam as Shelfie
- Katie Leclerc as herself
- Michelle Obama as herself
- Sia as Tomato
- Kira Hagi as a double for Waffles
- Arturo Castro, Chris Fleming, and Demi Adejuyigbe as Cheese Boy Band.

== Episodes ==
Series overview
Season	Episodes	Originally released
1	10	March 16, 2021
Special	1	November 23, 2021
Waffles + Mochi's Restaurant	6	October 17, 2022

=== Season 1 (2021) ===
No. overall	No. in season	Title	Original release date
1	1	"Tomato"	March 16, 2021
2	2	"Salt"	March 16, 2021
3	3	"Potato"	March 16, 2021
4	4	"Pickles"	March 16, 2021
5	5	"Rice"	March 16, 2021
6	6	"Egg"	March 16, 2021
7	7	"Herbs & Spices"	March 16, 2021
8	8	"Corn"	March 16, 2021
9	9	"Mushroom"	March 16, 2021
10	10	"Water"	March 16, 2021

=== Special (2021) ===
No. overall	No. in season	Title	Original release date
11	1	"Waffles + Mochi's Holiday Feast"	23 November 2021

=== Waffles + Mochi's Restaurant (2022) ===
No. overall	No. in season	Title	Original release date
12	1	"Honey"	17 October 2022
13	2	"Bread"	17 October 2022
14	3	"Chocolate vs. Vanilla"	17 October 2022
15	4	"Bananas"	17 October 2022
16	5	"Cheese"	17 October 2022
17	6	"Spicy"	17 October 2022

== Production and release ==
Waffles + Mochi was produced by Higher Ground Productions, the production company founded by former president and First Lady of the United States Barack Obama and Michelle Obama. It is one of the first programs to be made by the company for Netflix. Executive produced by Erika Thormahlen, Jeremy Konner, Tonia Davis, Priya Swaminathan, Alex Braverman, and the Obamas, it was announced on February 9, 2021, and its trailer was released on February 11. All episodes were made available to stream on Netflix on March 16, 2021.

The series was also produced by Hello Erika Productions, which was made by Erika Thormahlen, and Konner Productions, which was made by Jeremy Konner.

=== Puppets ===
The puppets were created by Viva La Puppet and had the unusual feature of being able to eat food on camera for multiple takes. Waffles had a "hidden pocket" that's cleanable along with a specifically designed glove to let Waffles eat hot food safely, according to Waffle's puppeteer Michelle Zamora. To improve Zamora's real-time reactions to Waffles eating food, they rigged the sets so Zamora could eat at the same time as Waffles and she said she was "getting spoon-fed tortellini from Massimo Bottura — world-renowned chefs!" They had "three or four puppets" on set for the eating scenes in case the puppets got too messy and were unable to be cleaned. The original plans for the puppets had them "as detailed as possible with animatronics" but decided to keep them simpler and Sesame Street-like with "puppetry rods clearly visible".

== Critical reception ==
On the review aggregation website Rotten Tomatoes, Waffles + Mochi holds an approval rating of 95% with an average rating 8.40/10, based on 21 reviews. The website's critics consensus reads, "A deliciously silly serving of edutainment, Waffles + Mochi is a delightful treat." On Metacritic, it has a score of 82 out of 100 based on 12 reviews, indicating "universal acclaim".

The Guardian critic Adrian Horton, giving the series a rating of 4 out of 5 stars, wrote that it is "hard to fault" and that it "strikes the difficult balance between didacticism, age-appropriate messaging and zany fun". The Los Angeles Times' Robert Lloyd described the series as "a well-balanced mix of familiar ingredients: a fanciful set, documentary visits to far-flung places, real kids being real, comical or calming adults, and puppets", while Sonia Saraiya of Vanity Fair wrote that Waffles + Mochi "feels wholesomely entertaining" as a show. Time's Judy Berman penned that the series is the "Sesame Street of food TV", describing it as "engaging, illuminating, curious and effortlessly inclusive".

On November 1, 2022, the series was nominated for five Children's and Family Emmy Awards including Outstanding Preschool Series at the 1st Children's and Family Emmy Awards.
