= Almost Sunrise =

- Directed by: Michael Collins
- Written by: Michael Collins; Eric Daniel Metzgar
- Produced by: Michael Collins; Marty Syjuco
- Cinematography: Clarissa de los Reyes
- Edited by: Eric Daniel Metzgar
- Music by: Adam Crystal
- Production company: Thoughtful Robot Productions
- Distributed by: Argot Pictures; Journeyman Films
- Release dates: May 27, 2016 (Telluride Mountainfilm Festival); June 11, 2016 (United States)
- Running time: 98 minutes
- Country: United States
- Language: English

Almost Sunrise is a 2016 American documentary film directed by Michael Collins and produced by Marty Syjuco. It recounts the story of two Iraq veterans, Tom Voss and Anthony Anderson, who, in an attempt to put their combat experience behind them, embark on a 2,700-mile trek on foot across America. It made its world premiere on the opening night of the Telluride Mountainfilm Festival on 27 May 2016. After its theatrical run, it aired on the PBS series POV.

== Premise ==
Tom Voss and Anthony Anderson are two troubled veterans of the Iraq War. Tom, haunted by his experiences in Iraq, struggles to find peace within himself. He comes from a family with a strong military background, and the scars of war have left him feeling disconnected and searching for healing. Anthony also battles inner demons and alienates those around him. He feels let down by the Veteran Affairs system, which fails to adequately address the complexities of veterans' struggles.

The two veterans decide to walk from Milwaukee, Wisconsin, to Los Angeles, California – over 2,700 miles, taking 155 days – in an attempt to find purpose, meaning, and healing and to cope with the "moral injury" caused by their actions during the war. As they set out on their arduous journey, the initial days prove difficult, with physical and emotional challenges taking a toll. As they progress, the support from fellow veterans and well-wishers along the way keeps them going.

Throughout the trek, Tom and Anthony engage in deep and honest conversations, sharing their experiences and grappling with the question of how a just God could allow such horrors in the world. The documentary intersperses their current journey with footage of war atrocities from their time in Iraq.

Amid the vast desert landscape, they meet a Native American veteran, who offers the two spiritual advice and provides an opportunity for an exchange of perspectives on war and its aftermath, and Father Thomas Keating, a 93-year-old Trappist monk who has counseled veterans since World War II.

As they finally reach the water at the end of Santa Monica Boulevard, joined by a combat mate of Tom's, Anthony expresses a restored faith in humanity, with the journey having opened his heart and mind to some level of hope and connection with people. On the other hand, Tom remains realistic about the trip's value, acknowledging its role in raising awareness about veterans' struggles but recognizing that it hasn't entirely "fixed" him.

== Cast ==
- Thomas Voss
- Anthony Anderson

== Reception ==
On the review aggregator website Rotten Tomatoes, the film holds an approval rating of 90% based on 10 reviews.

In his review for RogerEbert.com, film critic Glenn Kenny gave the documentary 3 out of 4 stars. He notes that the film "goes on to make a strong point about PTSD and “moral injury" and he recommends it to anyone concerned about the impact of war on veterans.

Frank Scheck of The Hollywood Reporter notes that Almost Sunrise "makes for powerful viewing" and highlights how the film distinguishes "moral injury" from PTSD. The New York Times' Neil Genzlinger praises the documentary for providing a deeper understanding of the troubles many veterans experience, specifically focusing on the concept of "moral injury". However, he notes that the film's exploration of therapeutic meditation for treating such trauma lacks in specific details, leaving the complex problem of veterans' struggles still relatively dimly illuminated.
