= Erika Thormahlen =

American actress

- Born: Oregon's Cascade Valley, U.S.
- Occupations: Actress (formerly); writer; producer; educator
- Years active: Acting (2000–2005); Education (2006–2011); Producing (2020–present)

Erika Thormahlen is an American former actress, writer, producer, former child model and former child educator. She is best known for her role as Ashley "Ash" Gordon on the NBC comedy-drama Just Deal. She is the co-creator of Waffles + Mochi, a show about food produced by Barack and Michelle Obama's production company, Higher Ground Productions for Netflix.

== Career ==
Thormahlen was born in Oregon's Cascade Valley. She began modeling at the age of 10. She attended Alameda High School in Alameda, California, and was slated to graduate in 1998 but instead opted for a GED. While studying for her degree in English and creative writing at UCLA, she was cast in the NBC Saturday morning program Just Deal co-starring as Ashley "Ash" Gordon. The show ran for 39 episodes before ending in its run 2002. Within the same year, she guest starred on episode of Angel as well as getting the lead role in the 2005 short film Smile for the Camera.

In 2007, Thormahlen earned a Master's degree in Education in Arts & Humanities at New York University.

Thormahlen also created, wrote and produced a TV pilot for kids focusing on food and nutrition called, What's Cooking with Waffles and Mousemeat. The puppet show also features a human cast including Simon Helberg, Jason Ritter and a guest interview with Maroon 5. The show premiered at the 2006 New York Television Festival.

In 2021, she and Jeremy Konner co-created a version of the original food-focused show with puppets called Waffles + Mochi on Netflix.

Thormahlen currently lives in New York City and works as a freelance writer, producer and creative consultant, as well as contributor to The Cut and New York Family magazine.

== Filmography ==
Film and television
Year	Title	Role	Notes
2000–2002	Just Deal	Ashley "Ash" Gordon	TV series, lead, 39 episodes
2002	Angel	Sunny	TV series, 1 episode
2005	Smile for the Camera	Kate	Lead role, independent short film
2021	Waffles + Mochi	Co-creator, executive producer, co-writer	TV series, 10 episodes
