= Kris Lemche =

Canadian actor (born 1978)

- Born: Kris Lemche; February 23, 1978 (age 48); Brampton, Ontario, Canada
- Occupation: Actor
- Years active: 1996–present
- Known for: Ian McKinley in Final Destination 3

Kris Lemche (born February 23, 1978) is a Canadian actor.

== Career ==
At 17 years old, Kris Lemche answered a newspaper casting call and won a role on the Disney series Flash Forward.

Abandoning plans to study biochemistry in university, Lemche instead moved to Prince Edward Island to work on the CBC series Emily of New Moon. His work on the show earned him a Gemini Award.

In 2015, Lemche was cast as the lead in the drama pilot Tales From The Darkside, a remake of the 1980s horror/fantasy/thriller anthology series; ultimately, the Tales From The Darkside pilot was not picked up by a television network.

== Filmography ==
=== Film ===
Year	Title	Role	Notes
1998	Teen Knight	Peter	as Kristopher Lemche; also known as Medieval Park
1999	eXistenZ	Noel Dichter	
1999	Johnny	Sean	
2000	Ginger Snaps	Sam McDonald	
2000	Saint Jude	Gabe	
2001	Knockaround Guys	Decker	
2002	My Little Eye	Rex	
2005	A Simple Curve	Caleb	
2006	Roundhay Garden Scene 2	Canadian Spy	Short film
2006	Final Destination 3	Ian McKinley	
2006	Jack Rabbit	Darien DeCallo	Short film
2006	State's Evidence	Patrick	
2007	The FP	KCDC	Short film
2007	The Day the Dead Weren't Dead	Vincent Baker	Short film
2008	Conversation with the Supplicant	Supplicant	Short film
2009	Rosencrantz and Guildenstern Are Undead	Vince	
2011	In Time	Markus	
2011	Green Guys	Travis Howard	
2012	Alter Egos	Fridge/Brendan	
2013	The Frankenstein Theory	Jonathan Venkenheim	
2015	Magic Hour	Dillon Fox	
2016	They're Watching	Alex Torini	
2016	New Life	Michael	
2018	A Good Dinner Party	Leo-Paul	Short film
2019	The Wound	Otto	Short film

=== Television ===
Year	Title	Role	Notes
1996	Flash Forward	Zed Goldhawk	Episode: "Double Bill"
1996	Goosebumps	Sticks	Episode: "The Scarecrow Walks at Midnight"
1997	Newton: A Tale of Two Isaacs	Humphrey Newton	TV movie
1998	Eerie, Indiana: The Other Dimension	Rodney Covington	Episode: "The Goody Two-Shoes People"
1998–2000	Emily of New Moon	Perry Miller	32 episodes
1998–2000	La Femme Nikita	Greg Hillinger	5 episodes
1999	Joan of Arc	Emile	TV miniseries
2000	Twitch City	Clinton	2 episodes
2000	Children of Fortune	Shane Robertson	TV movie
2001	Bailey's Mistake	Malachy	TV movie
2002	My Guide to Becoming a Rock Star	Lucas Zank	Main role, 6 episodes
2003	The Division	Darren	Episode: "Murder.com"
2003	L.A. Dragnet	Randy Southbrook	Episode: "Sticks and Stones"
2003–2004	Joan of Arcadia	Cute Boy God	9 episodes
2004	The Last Casino	Scott	TV movie
2005	Criminal Minds	Eddy Mays	Episode: "Blood Hungry"
2007	Psych	Brandon Peterson	Episode: "Poker? I Barely Know Her"
2007	Ghost Whisperer	Scott	3 episodes
2008	24: Redemption	Chris Whitley	TV movie
2009	NCIS: Los Angeles	Tom Smith	Episode: "Random on Purpose"
2010	Edgar Floats	Timmy/Bunny	TV movie
2010	CSI: Crime Scene Investigation	Joey	Episode: "Sgweegel"
2012	Flashpoint	Stewart	Episode: "Eyes In"
2013	CSI: NY	Anthony Lombardo	Episode: "Civilized Lies"
2013–2015	Haven	Seth Byrne	6 episodes
2015	Agents of S.H.I.E.L.D.	Ethan Johnston	2 episodes
2018–2020	Private Eyes	Deputy Eddie Conroy	3 episodes
2022	Beyond the Dark	Otto	Episode: "The Wound"
2025	Wild Cards	Edgar "Lorne" Peplow	Episode: "The Lorne Identity"
