= Ketchen, Saskatchewan =

Community in Saskatchewan, Canada

Coordinates: 51°59′37″N 102°49′06″W

Ketchen is a hamlet in the Canadian province of Saskatchewan.

== Demographics ==
In the 2021 Census of Population conducted by Statistics Canada, Ketchen had a population of 20 living in 9 of its 9 total private dwellings, a change of 33.3% from its 2016 population of 15. With a land area of 0.18 km^{2} (0.069 sq mi), it had a population density of 111.1/km^{2} (287.8/sq mi) in 2021.

== See also ==
- List of communities in Saskatchewan
