= Geneva Carr =

American actress (b. 1971)

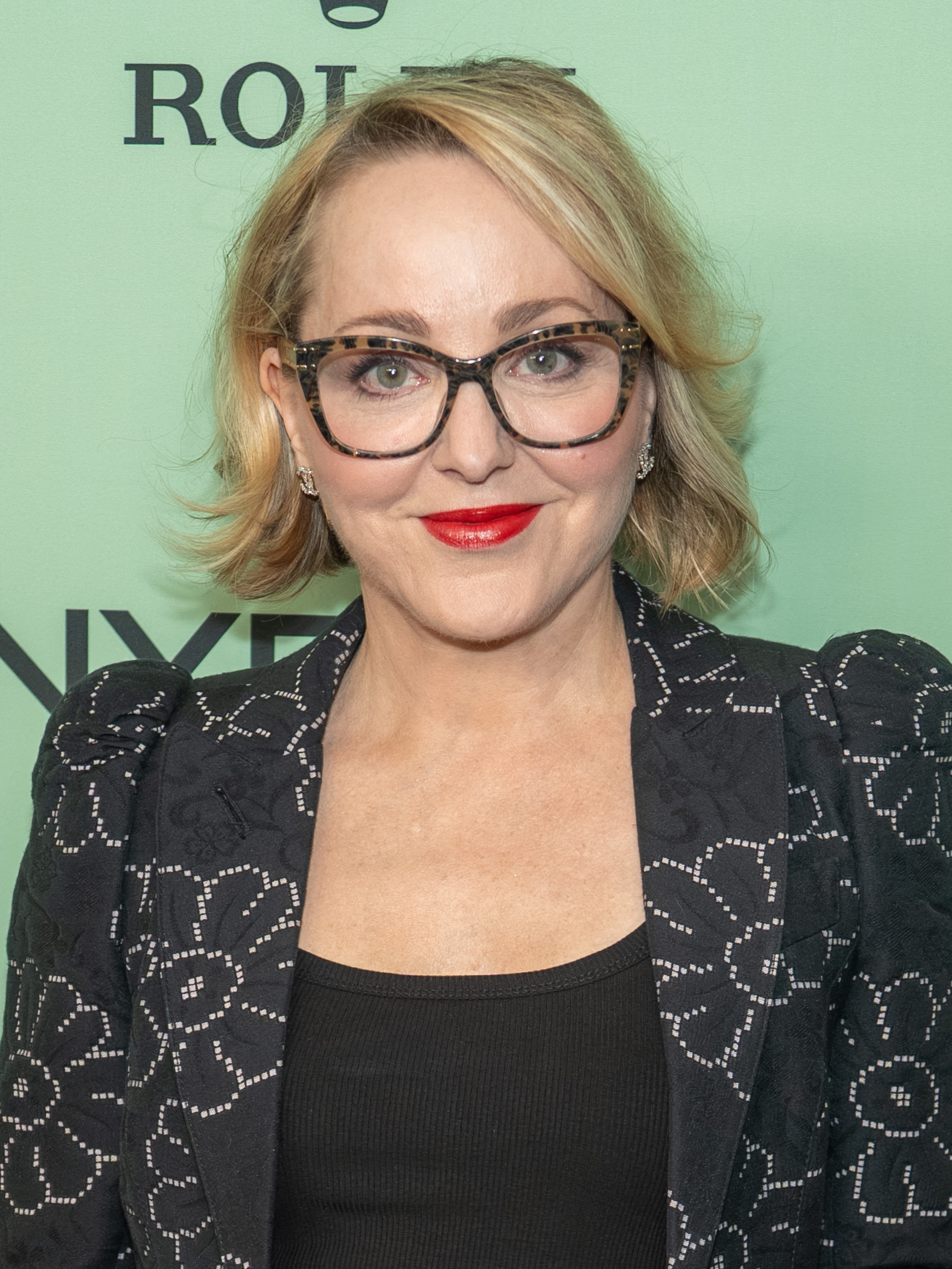
- Carr at the 2025 New York Film Festival
- Born: May 6, 1971 (age 55); Jackson, Mississippi, U.S.
- Education: Mount Holyoke College, ESCP Europe
- Occupation: Actress
- Years active: 1997–present
- Spouse: Yuji Yamazaki (m. 2014; div. 2015)

Geneva Carr (born May 6, 1971) is an American television and stage actress with an extensive acting résumé. She is best known for her portrayal of Marissa Morgan on the CBS television series Bull and for her performance as Margery in the original Broadway cast of Hand to God, earning a nomination for the Tony Award for Best Actress in a Play.

== Early life and career ==
Carr was born in Jackson, Mississippi, to George and Phyllis (née Duba) Carr. She has two brothers, George Carr II and Joseph Carr.

Carr studied French at Mount Holyoke College and initially had a career in banking before deciding to become an actress. She studied French in Paris and earned her MBA in Business from ESCP. She studied acting with Jane Hoffman at the Actors Studio. To support herself while she honed her craft and auditioned for parts, Carr waited on tables, bartended, and did gigs as a voice actress.

She played "Mom" on the AT&T commercials where she fretted over lost "rollover" minutes, and her big break was in the Broadway play Hand to God in 2015.

== Filmography ==
=== Film ===
Year	Title	Role	Notes
1998	Restaurant	Funeral Guest	Uncredited
2001	The 3 Little Wolfs	Shannen Wolf	
2002	Fish in the Sea Is Not Thirsty	Veronique	Short film
2004	Neurotica	Stacey	
2005	Charlie's Party	Mitsy Ann	
2005	One Last Thing...	Hospital Administrator	Uncredited
2007	Then She Found Me	Woman in Her 20s	
2008	College Road Trip	Mrs. O'Mally	
2009	Rosencrantz and Guildenstern Are Undead	Charlotte Lawrence	
2009	Company Retreat	Chessy	
2009	It's Complicated	Woman at Fertility Clinic	
2010	Case Closed	Angela Biggs	Short film
2010	Love & Other Drugs	Viagra Nurse #2	
2011	High Maintenance	Melissa	Short film
2011	The Melancholy Fantastic	Mrs. Wiley	
2011	Smile	Tess	Short film
2012	Alter Egos	Newscaster	
2012	Visions of Joanna	Joanna Wyatt	Short film
2013	Darkroom	Mother	Video
2015	Creative Control	Client	
2015	Ava's Possessions	Darlene	
2015	Completely Normal	Mary	
2016	The Harrow	Adele	
2017	Blame	Mrs. Howell	
2017	Wonder Wheel	Ginny's Friend	
2019	klutz.	Shandra	Short film
2019	All the Little Things We Kill	Ann Archer	
2020	Karma	Dr. Green	Short film
2023	Run Amok	Principal Linda	Short film
2023	Asian Persuasion	Helene Dubois	
2025	Mooch	Sheila	
TBA	American Retail	Lilith	Short film; post-production

=== Television ===
Year	Title	Role	Notes
1997	Spin City	Kathy	Episode: "The Thirty Year Itch"
2002	Sex and the City	Delivery Nurse	Episode: "I Heart NY"
2003	Law & Order: Criminal Intent	Camilla	Episode: "Pravda"
2004	Chappelle's Show	Airline Employee	Episode: "2.6"
2004	Third Watch	Caroline / Sarah Guile	2 episodes
2004	Law & Order: Special Victims Unit	Margo Sanders	Episode: "Weak"
2005	Jonny Zero	Mrs. Weston	Episode: "No Good Deed"
2005	Hope & Faith	Kathy	2 episodes
2005	Law & Order: Trial by Jury	Talia Rawlings	Episode: "Baby Boom"
2005–2009	Law & Order: Criminal Intent	Faith Yancy	6 episodes
2007	What Goes On	Naomi Knowles	Unknown episodes
2007	Two Families	—N/a	TV movie
2009	The Unusuals	Cheryl Thayler	Episode: "The E.I.D."
2009	Law & Order: Special Victims Unit	Katie Harris	Episode: "Unstable"
2009	Law & Order	Larry's Accountant	Episode: "Reality Bites"
2010	How to Make It in America	Tiny Apartment Mom	Episode: "Unhappy Birthday"
2010	Team Umizoomi	(voice)	Episode: "The Ghost Family Costume Party"
2010	The Good Wife	Beth	Episode: "Bad Girls"
2011	Onion News Network	Diane Connor	6 episodes
2011	Rescue Me	Pamela Keppler	4 episodes
2012	Person of Interest	Nurse Liz Picket	Episode: "Critical"
2012	Blue Bloods	Sally Burton	Episode: "Secrets and Lies"
2013	Yoga Partner	Tanya	Unknown episodes
2013	Your Pretty Face Is Going to Hell	Tiffany	Episode: "Devil in the Details"
2013	Elementary	Rebecca Burrell	Episode: "Déjà Vu All Over Again"
2014	The Mysteries of Laura	Danielle Bailey	Episode: "The Mystery of the Mobile Murder"
2015	Younger	Mary Beth Bell	Episode: "Pilot"
2015	Deadbeat	Linda	Episode: "The Ex-orcism"
2015	Law & Order: Special Victims Unit	Pam Baker	Episode: "Patrimonial Burden"
2016	I Shudder	Susan Marie Henglebert	TV movie
2016–2022	Bull	Marissa Morgan	125 episodes
2023	Law & Order	Jenny Newhall	Episode: "Collateral Damages"
2024	Elsbeth	Poppy Hayes	Episode: "Something Blue"
2026	Cape Fear	Legal commentator	1 episodes

=== Video games ===
Year	Title	Role
2006	Bully	Jimmy Hopkins' Mom
2011	Saints Row: The Third	Radio Voices
