= Daniel Schechter (director) =

American film director, editor and screenwriter

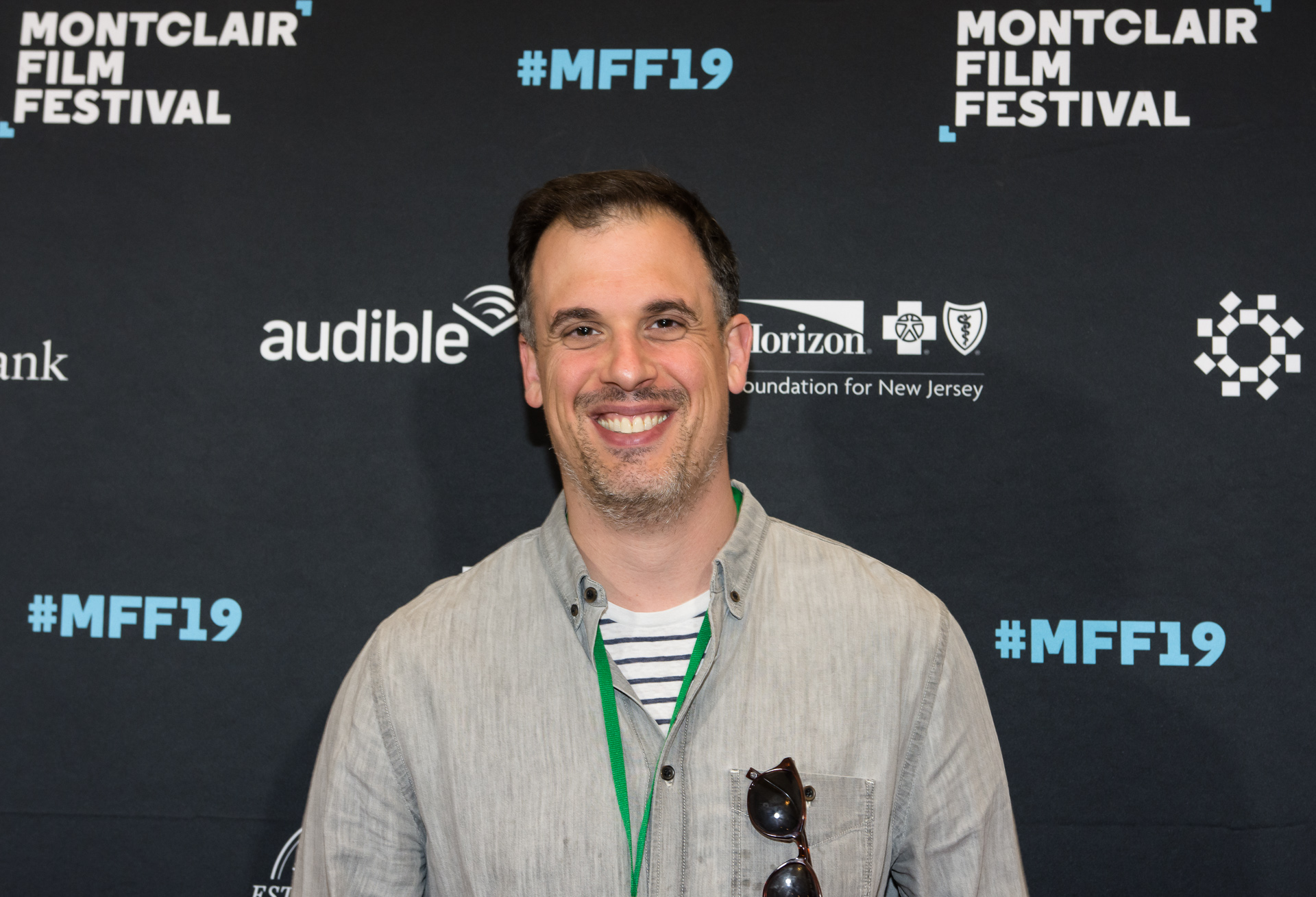
- Schechter at the premiere of Safe Spaces during the Montclair Film Festival 2019
- Occupations: Director, screenwriter, editor
- Years active: 2003–present

Daniel Schechter is an American film director, editor and screenwriter. His film Supporting Characters debuted at the Tribeca Film Festival in 2012. His third film, Life of Crime, which stars Jennifer Aniston, Tim Robbins and Isla Fisher, was chosen to close out the 2013 Toronto International Film Festival and was released in theaters and on VOD on August 29, 2014. His film After Class (originally titled Safe Spaces), starring Justin Long, premiered at the 2019 Tribeca Film Festival, and was released in theaters on December 6, 2019.

== Filmography ==
Year	Title	Credited as	Notes
2003	The Good Life	Writer and editor	Short film
2005	The Butcher and the Housewife	Writer	Short film
2006	The Big Bad Swim	Writer	
2007	Goodbye Baby	Writer and director	
2012	Supporting Characters	Writer, director, and editor	
2013	Life of Crime	Writer and director	
2019	After Class	Writer, director, and editor	
