= Rosencrantz and Guildenstern Are Undead =

2009 film by Jordan Galland

- Film poster
- Directed by: Jordan Galland
- Written by: Jordan Galland
- Produced by: Mike Landry; Carlos Velazquez
- Starring: Jake Hoffman; Devon Aoki; John Ventimiglia
- Cinematography: Chris Lavasseur
- Edited by: Connor Kalista
- Music by: Sean Lennon
- Production companies: C Plus Pictures; Off Hollywood Pictures; Offhollywood Digital
- Distributed by: Indican
- Release date: January 19, 2009 (Slamdance Film Festival)
- Running time: 95 minutes
- Country: United States
- Language: English

Rosencrantz and Guildenstern Are Undead is a 2009 American independent film written and directed by Jordan Galland. The film's title refers to a fictitious play-within-the-movie, which is a comic reinterpretation of Shakespeare's Hamlet and its aftermath and whose title is a reference to the play Rosencrantz and Guildenstern Are Dead by Tom Stoppard. Jake Hoffman stars and the cast includes Devon Aoki, John Ventimiglia, Kris Lemche, Ralph Macchio, Jeremy Sisto and Waris Ahluwalia. The score was composed and performed by Sean Lennon.

Shooting began in November 2007, and principal photography was completed on December 23, 2007.

== Plot ==
Unemployed young lothario Julian Marsh is forced by his doctor father to accept a job directing an off-Broadway play called Rosencrantz and Guildenstern Are Undead, which is described as a weird adaptation of Hamlet. The play has been written by mysterious, pallid Romanian Theo Horace, a vampire who has just killed a young woman. Unaware of the danger surrounding Theo's play, Julian casts his best friend Vince as Hamlet and uses his new job to impress his ex-girlfriend Anna, an aspiring actress. Anna has taken up with shady businessman Bobby Bianchi who has reputed ties to the Mafia. When Anna is cast as Ophelia, she slowly gets involved with Theo. The roles of Rosencrantz and Guildenstern in Theo's play are filled by Carlo and Mickey, two narcissistic actors as foolish as their assigned characters. Opening night draws near and people begin to die. Two bumbling New York City detectives chase suspects.

The play within the film

Theo's play, Rosencrantz and Guildenstern Are Undead, is revealed in short segments throughout the movie. Its basic plot points are that Hamlet's friend Horatio (played by Theo) is a master vampire, over 2000 years old, who had once lived in ancient Rome. Through a series of twists and turns, Hamlet and his simple-minded friends, Rosencrantz and Guildenstern, become vampires themselves. When Horatio attempts to turn Hamlet's girlfriend Ophelia into a vampire, she thwarts him by drowning herself first. Hamlet angrily confronts Horatio but discovers that one vampire cannot kill another. His only hope of reversing the curse that rendered him a vampire is to find the Holy Grail and drink from it. Horatio also becomes obsessed with finding the Grail in order to destroy it. The battle for the Grail between Hamlet and Horatio lasts for centuries and leads to the creation of four plays, each concealing a secret message. The first is Shakespeare's Hamlet, written at Horatio's bidding. The second is Rosencrantz and Guildenstern, written in the nineteenth century by W. S. Gilbert (one half of Gilbert and Sullivan). The third is Tom Stoppard's Rosencrantz and Guildenstern Are Dead, written in 1964. The final play in the cycle is this one, Rosencrantz and Guildenstern Are Undead, written by Horatio himself under the name Theo Horace, with the purpose of luring the real Hamlet into a final confrontation.

== Cast ==
- Jake Hoffman as Julian Marsh
- Devon Aoki as Anna Blake
- John Ventimiglia as Theo Horace
- Kris Lemche as Vince
- Ralph Macchio as Bobby Bianchi
- Jeremy Sisto as Detective Wimbly
- Geneva Carr as Charlotte Lawrence
- Waris Ahluwalia as Hugo Pepper
- Joey Kern as the real Prince Hamlet
- Graham Malcolm as Mr. Liden
- Chip Zien as Dr. Marsh
- Azie Tesfai as Zadeska
- Carmen Goodine as Lyuba
- Carlos Velazquez as Carlo
- Mike Landry as Mickey
- Lou Carbonneau as Rookie Detective

== Production ==
Jordan Galland first conceived of the name, Rosencrantz and Guildenstern Are Undead, after playing Rosencrantz in a high school production of Tom Stoppard's play Rosencrantz and Guildenstern Are Dead at the age of 14. Several years later he was introduced to Stoppard, who encouraged him to pursue the idea. The film was shot in New York City at the end of 2007. Galland, along with his editor, Connor Kalista, and cinematographer, Chris Lavasseur, presented their experience with the Red One at a content panel ("Case Study: Rosencrantz and Guildenstern Are Undead") at the National Association of Broadcasters convention (NABShow 2008), on April 15, 2008.

== Soundtrack ==
Galland's longtime collaborator Sean Lennon created an original musical score for the film.

== Awards and nominations ==
- 2010 Comedy Award at the Washington DC Independent Film Festival
- 2009 Nominated for best production design at the Strasbourg Film Festival

== Release ==
The film ran in a limited cinema release in the United States on 11 June 2010. It is distributed by Indican Pictures.

=== Film festivals ===
- World premiere at a special screening at the Slamdance Film Festival in January 2009.
- Canadian premiere at the Canadian Music Week Film Festival, March 14, 2009.
- Special Presentations screening at the American Film Institute Dallas International Film Festival, March 27 and 29, 2009.
- Feature film presentation at Newport Beach Film Festival, April 26, 2009.
- Feature film presentation at the Delray Beach Film Festival, May 24, 2009.
- East Coast premiere at the Stony Brook Film Festival, July 24, 2009.
- European premiere, Strasbourg International Film Festival, September 6, 2009.
- Spotlight screening at the Friars Club Comedy Film Festival, September 26, 2009.
- Feature film screening at the Hollywood Film Festival, October 24, 2009.
- Middle East premiere: Icon Film Festival, October 10, 2009.
- Asian festival premiere at the Kaohsiung Film Festival, October 18, 20 and 24, 2009.
- Feature film screening, San Francisco Independent Film Festival, February 5 and 9, 2010.
- Feature film screening, Washington DC Independent Film Festival, March 13, 2010.
- United States cinema release, June 11, 2010.

== Critical reception ==
Website Metacritic assigned the film a 45 out of 100, indicating "mixed or average reviews". Variety gave the film a fairly positive review stating: "Rosencrantz & Guildenstern Are Undead is one sly slice of the ridiculous."
