= Ketch (disambiguation) =

A ketch is a sailing craft with two masts.

Ketch may also refer to:

- Ketch Harbour, Nova Scotia, Canada

== People with the surname ==
- Daniel Ketch, a Marvel Comics character
- Jack Ketch (died 1686), English executioner
- Megan Ketch, American actress

== Other uses ==
- Project Ketch, a Project Plowshare program to create a natural gas reservoir in Pennsylvania with nuclear explosives

== See also ==
- Catch (disambiguation)
