= Hollowphonic =

Canadian music collective

- Origin: Toronto, Ontario, Canada
- Genres: ambient, space rock
- Years active: 1996–2019
- Labels: Pharmasound, Minor Sphere Records, Sweet Tooth Recordings
- Members: Brad Ketchen

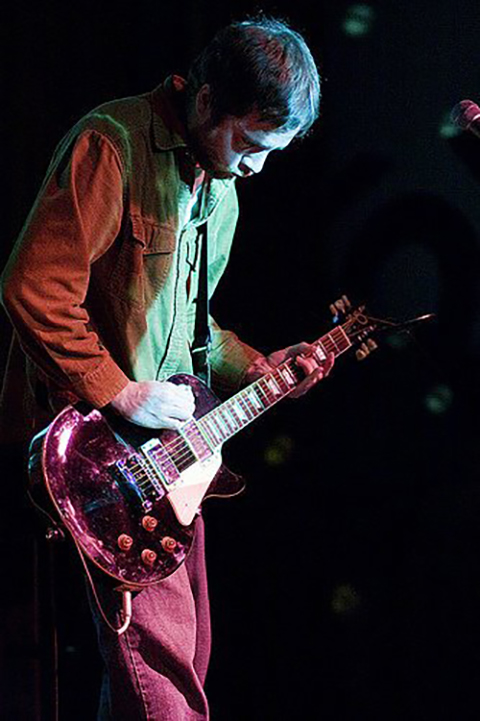
Brad from Hollowphonic on stage at The Drake, Toronto. February 14 2010.

Hollowphonic is an ambient, space rock, shoegaze, musical collective based out of the Canadian city of Toronto, Ontario. The outfit, founded by Brad Ketchen in 1999, has performed at various notable events, including the Canadian Music Week and North by Northeast festivals.

Hollowphonic has also opened for a variety of acts, including Manic Street Preachers, Low, Super Furry Animals, and Los Campesinos.

Hollowphonic first began in 1996 as the name 'Hollow'. After Brad recorded a 4-track demo, he began recording songs (all in the key of D) at Rob Sanzo's 'Signal To Noise' studio with assistance from James Cavalluzzo (Malhavoc) tweaking the effects on 2" inch tape. Brad further worked the tracks into a couple of songs that appeared on the first release Phonic 50 mg. The first being "Sertraline" and the second originally appearing on a split Modernation release with 'More Plastic' called "Happy". The drums from the latter were reworked into a song called "Time Is All I Need" on Phonic 50 mg.

Phonic 50 mg was recorded with Rob Sanzo with additional tracks recorded and mixed at Brad's studio, Pharmasound. Tom Bartnick created the electronic element and the band went from a sludge/space rock sound to a full out Electronic space rock shoegaze bliss. The record, released in June 1999, was not shopped around but was approached by a new label called 'Sweet Tooth Recordings'. Brad enlisted a barrage of musicians to back him up live. Some of these included members of Escalate, Vulcan Dub Squad, Speedway, Crystal Castles, The Uncut, and Old Soul.

During the release of the second record Majestic in 2002, Brad played bass in the post Southpacific group Summerside. Brad then joined the band Bluescreen, playing guitar while writing, producing, recording and playing live with his Electronic/idm side group In Support of Living, scoring feature-length films and collaborating with Portland, Oregon, Film Director Rob Tyler.

Hollowphonic has been playing random gigs including a 4-song set for the Toronto Spacemen 3 benefit gig for Spacemen 3/Spiritualized record sleeve designer and artist, Natty Brooker, December 4, 2010, and some scaled down solo shows, including playing material from his In Support of Living project, in and around Toronto. Brad has also been involved in remixing artists such as The Holiday Crowd, and feature film, trailer post production and score work.

The latest record 'Viaduct' was released on February 14, 2014, internet only through Chicago label Minor Sphere Records. A CD/vinyl version will be available in the future.

Brad contributed a cover of Sianspheric's "Broken Man" to Canadian blog, Quick Before It Melts compilation, Canadian bands covering Canadian songs recorded before 2004, called Dominionated Deux released on Canada Day in 2015 celebrating Canada's birth of 148 Years.

A new record released in September 2019 celebrates 20 years of the band and a "retrospective" of unreleased material, demos and new mixes during that time. It will also signal the end of the Hollowphonic name as Brad moves on with future endeavours.

== Discography ==
=== Albums ===
- Phonic 50mg, 1999, Sweet Tooth Recordings (Re-released 2002 via Pharmasound)
- Majestic, 2002, Pharmasound
- Viaduct, 2014, Minor Sphere Records
- Retrospectiv 20, 2018, Pharmasound

=== EPs and singles ===
- Happy and Sertraline on Split Single with More Plastic (1996 release via Modernation Records) Listed as "Hollow"
- Sticky 'Feeling Zero' Remix (1999 release via Sweet Tooth Recordings) Listed as "Hollow"

=== Compilation inclusions ===
- Sweet Little Things, 1998, Sweet Tooth Recordings
- Errol's Compilation, 2002, Errol Records
- Dominionated Deux, 2015, Dominionated Magazine
- Rock Back For Ecuador, 2016, Patetico Recordings
