= Waris Ahluwalia =

Indian-American designer and actor

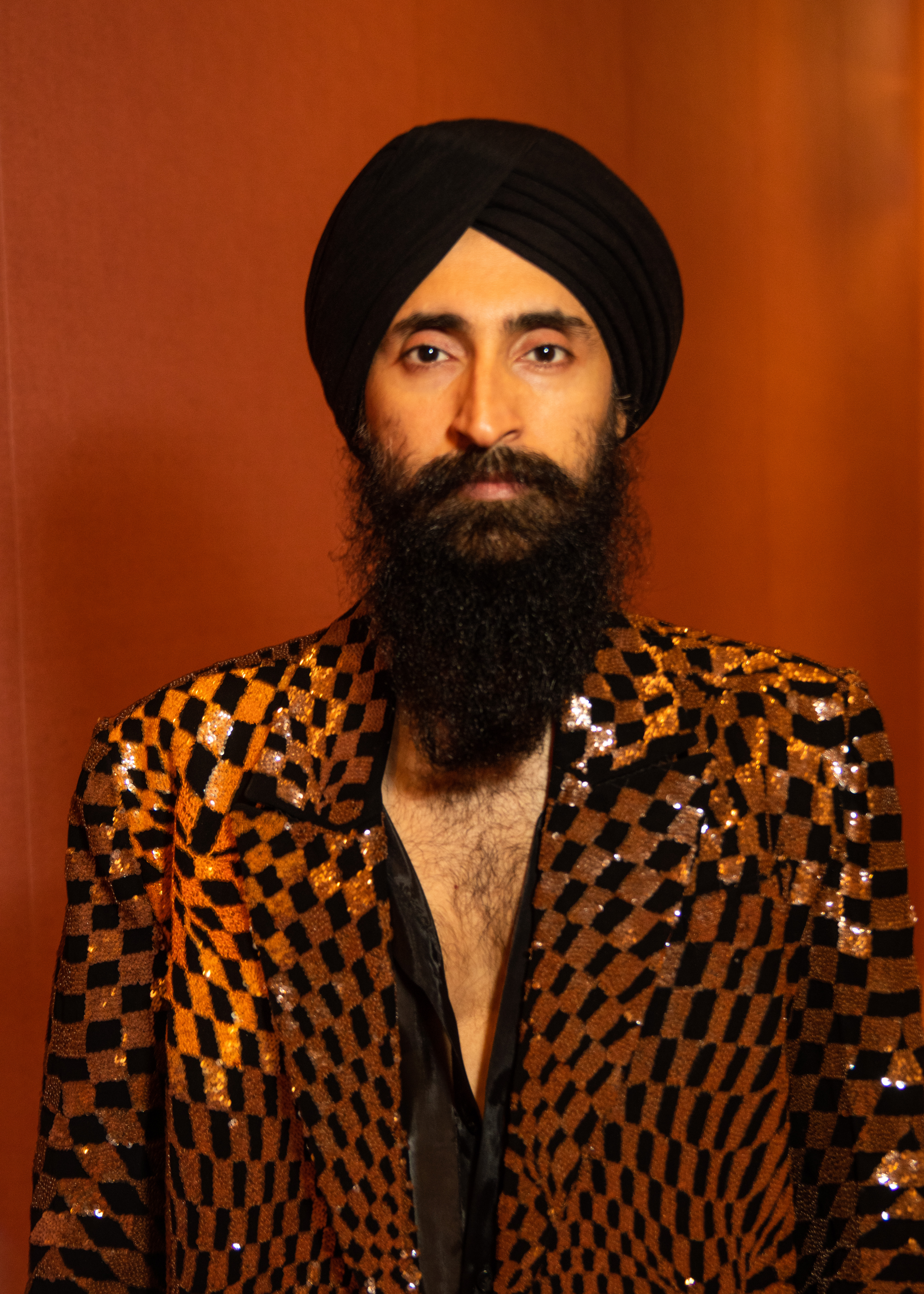
- Ahluwalia at the Nita Mukesh Ambani Cultural Centre in 2023
- Born: Waris Singh Ahluwalia; 1975 or 1976 (age 50–51); Amritsar, Punjab, India
- Occupations: Designer, actor
- Years active: 2004–present

Waris Singh Ahluwalia is a Sikh-American designer and actor based in New York City. His company, House of Waris, has collaborated with a number of other designers and artists throughout the years. House of Waris came into being after the owners of Maxfield's in Los Angeles noticed Ahluwalia's elaborate diamond rings and placed an order, which sold out.

== Early life ==
Waris Singh Ahluwalia was born in Amritsar, Punjab, India into a Punjabi Sikh family of the Ahluwalia caste. When he was only five years old, his family migrated to the United States from India and grew up in Bay Ridge, Brooklyn, New York. He is based in New York City but has also lived in Los Angeles.

== Career ==
=== Designer ===
House of Waris, founded by Ahluwalia, is strongly influenced by ancient kingdoms.

Ahluwalia isn't primarily a jewellery designer, but he has designed several pieces. He is now based in New York City and travels frequently to Rome and Rajasthan, working with craftsmen in each city, from goldsmiths to diamond setters who once made the crests for royal families. He was a CFDA/Vogue Fashion Fund Finalist in 2009, and in 2010 he was inducted as a member of the CFDA. The same year, Ahluwalia was placed on Vanity Fair's Best Dressed List, anointed British GQ's second best dressed man internationally and included in Vogue's 10 Most Impactful People list. He also pens the column "Love & Waris" on Style.com.

The pavilion of the pop up space housed apparel and accessories, and jewellery by Ahluwalia.

In February 2011, Ahluwalia held his first New York Fashion Week presentation at the Museum of Arts & Design, launching a line of scarves made in India: block printed, hand dyed, silk screened.

==== Collaborations/special projects ====
Using House of Waris as a platform for collaborations, Waris has worked with A.P.C., Forevermark of the De Beers Group of Companies, and Tilda Swinton for Pringle of Scotland. Ahluwalia has also collaborated with Benjami Cho, yoox.com, Lookmatic, the Webster Miami, Colette in Paris, Elliott Puckette for NewbarK, and the World Gold Council.

In response to the Mumbai attack in November 2008, Ahluwalia, along with Mortimer Singer and Tina Bhojwani, created To India, with Love, a book aiming to raise funds, spirits, and awareness for the victims of the attacks. All of the proceeds went to Taj Public Service Welfare Trust in conjunction with Mumbai: We Got Your Back! (WGYB!), an organization founded by the three editors.

In 2012, Ahluwalia contributed to the summer issue of The Paris Review, writing an essay on art featuring the work of Walton Ford and Ryan McGinley. Ahluwalia also collaborated with the world-renowned restaurant from New Delhi, BUKHARA. The restaurant opened an exclusive pop up in London at the Sheraton Park Tower in which Ahluwalia served as Creative Director. The pop up ran for two weeks and donated a portion of the proceeds obtained to support the Elephant Family non-profit organization.

As a part of his role as Global Ambassador for Starwood, Ahluwalia wrote and produced the short film, "HERE: a Film" by Luca Guadagnino. The film's team included Tilda Swinton (co-writer), Heidi Bivens (stylist), Jason Schwartzman (music) and Agyness Deyn (actress).

In 2013, House of Waris launched a line for Valentine's Day, called 'Boo', referring to it as a term of endearment. To promote the line, Ahluwalia commissioned nine artists and filmmakers to make short films titled You're my Boo including Phillip Andelman, Casey Neistat, Brett Stabler, Ben Watts, Hailey Gates, John Forté, Mick Rock, and Matthew Frost.

Ahluwalia collaborated with Illesteva Eyewear on a line of sunglasses that were launched in April 2013. The sunglasses are made in France and are available in four colors.

In 2013, Ahluwalia started House of Waris Rare, a chain of boutiques, and celebrated its opening in the Gritti Palace in Venice.

As one of the most photographed men in the city, he modeled for GAP in 2013.

In 2019, he opened a pop up tea room House of Waris Botanicals under the High Line. The tea house is located in Chelsea.

=== Actor ===
Ahluwalia's first film was The Life Aquatic with Steve Zissou (2004) by Wes Anderson, as Vikram Ray, with a cast that included Bill Murray, Owen Wilson, Anjelica Huston, and Cate Blanchett. He played a short role in Wes Anderson's critically acclaimed The Grand Budapest Hotel. His film Beeba Boys, directed by Deepa Mehta and starring Randeep Hooda, was released on October 16, 2015.

== Filmography ==
=== Film ===
Year	Title	Role	Notes
2004	America Brown	Natasha Lyonne's friend	
2004	The Life Aquatic with Steve Zissou	Vikram Ray	
2005	The F Word	Republican Fundraiser	
2006	Inside Man	Vikram Walia	
2007	High Falls	Bud	Short film
2007	The Darjeeling Limited	The Chief Steward	
2007	Hotel Chevalier	Security	Short film
2007	Henry the Otter	Store Clerk 1	Short film
2009	Rosencrantz and Guildenstern Are Undead	Hugo Pepper	
2010	I Am Love	Shai Kubelkian	
2012	Missed Connections	Pradeep	
2014	The Grand Budapest Hotel	M. Dino	
2015	Beeba Boys	Manny	
2017	Okja	Waris	
2018	Ocean's 8	Himself	
2025	Ballerina	The Eye	

=== Television ===
Year	Title	Role	Notes
2009	The Unusuals	Customer	Episode: "Pilot"
2013	The Carrie Diaries	The Sikh	Episodes: "Pilot" "The Great Unknown"
2019	Russian Doll	Wardog	Episode: "The Great Escape"
2021	Ramy	Sikh man at Sex Addicts AA	Episode: "a blanket over the television"
2022	Russian Doll	Wardog	Episode: "Matryoshka"
2023	Extrapolations	Dr. Harbaksh Mann	Episode: "2059 Part II: Nightbirds"
2025	Poker Face	Director	Episode: "Last Looks"

== Turban-related incident in Mexico City ==
In February 2016, Ahluwalia stated he was barred from boarding an Aeroméxico flight due to his turban and that therefore he was delayed from flying home to attend New York Fashion Week. He called for education and cultural sensitivity at the Mexico City International Airport with regard to Sikhism and other religious headwear.

== Recognition ==
In 2010, Ahluwalia was listed among the International Best-Dressed List's honorees by Vanity Fair.

== See also ==
- Indians in the New York City metropolitan area
