= Feature.fm =

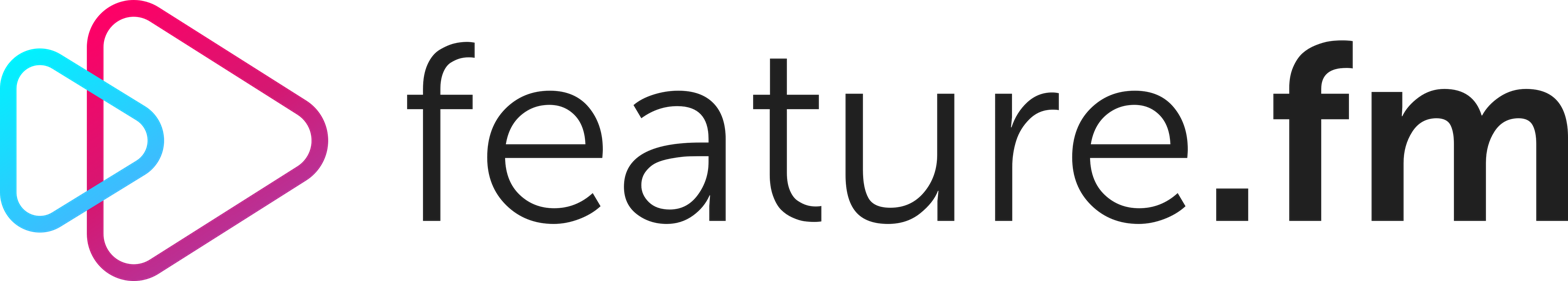
- Company type: Private
- Founded: 2013
- Headquarters: New York City, United States and Tel Aviv, Israel
- Country of origin: Israel
- Founders: Lior Aharoni, Zohar Aharoni, Lior Shapsa
- CEO: Lior Aharoni
- Key people: Lior Aharoni: Co-Founder & CEO; Zohar Aharoni: Co-Founder & CTO; Daniel Sander: CCO
- Industry: Music
- Products: Music Smart Links, Pre-Saves, Social Unlocks, Action Pages, Contests, Sponsored Songs, Social Advertising, Retargeting, Audience Email Collection, Audience Communications
- Services: Music marketing, advertising, and analytics platform
- Website: feature.fm
- Launched: 22 July 2014
- Current status: Active

Feature.fm is a marketing and advertising platform for music industry professionals like labels, artists, and other music marketers. They offer a self-serve, music-focused ad platform and a marketing suite to help artists marketing to fans in a smarter way. The Marketing Suite includes tools like Pre-Saves, Gated Unlocks & Contests, Music Smart Link Landing Pages, Audience Email Collection, Music Analytics, and other landing pages that fans engage with or are directed to the artist's content. The ad platform includes a native song advertising network through which artists can promote their songs inside music streaming services and on music websites. Artists' sponsored songs are played to people who are currently listening to streaming radio of the artist's style of music as an alternative to traditional audio ads. Feature.fm partners with streaming services to help them reduce audio ads and improve user experience by using native content as a source of advertising.

Feature.fm is currently funded by Star Farm Ventures.

== Sponsored Song Partners ==
Feature.fm is currently partnered with 8tracks, Deezer, Audiomack, Sua Musica, and a network of music websites and blogs.

== Founders ==
Feature.fm was founded by Lior Aharoni, Zohar Aharoni and Lior Shapsa.
