= Smile for the Camera =

- Film poster
- Directed by: Jordan Galland
- Written by: Jordan Galland; Sean Lennon
- Produced by: Jordan Galland
- Starring: Erika Thormahlen; Mark Sarosi; Steven Bender; Kristin Victoria Barron
- Cinematography: Jordan Galland; Sean Lennon; Mark Sarosi
- Edited by: Jordan Galland
- Music by: Adam Crystal; Timo Ellis; David Muller; Jordan Galland; Sean Lennon
- Distributed by: Dopo Yume Pictures
- Release date: March 11, 2005
- Running time: 29 minutes
- Country: United States
- Language: English

Smile for the Camera is a short 2005 independent film. It was directed, produced and edited by Jordan Galland, who co-wrote the story and screenplay with Sean Lennon. Galland and Lennon also wrote the theme song, which was performed by Galland's Domino bandmate Domino Kirke and her sister Jemima Kirke. Although the film's cast, with the exception of Erika Thormahlen, had no previous acting experience, Milla Jovovich and Sean Lennon make cameo appearances as "Boxheads". The film has been released on DVD.

== Plot summary ==
Two students uncover a series of mysterious signs in otherwise normal photographs taken around New York City with an antique spoon. They determine that these are clues that depict a pathway from a train station in New York City to a seahorse in the wilderness. Kate sets off alone to follow the crumbs, which leads her to a terrifying encounter with a psychic in a decaying cottage. The psychic falls prey to the Boxheads, a mysterious and evil cult that traps victims, whose smiling photographs appear on boxes that hide the faces of the cult members. Escaping from the psychic's cottage, Kate waltzes through the woods, taking shelter for the night in an eerie motel where she has frightening dreams and hallucinations. In one of these, a young girl falls victim to the Boxheads and disappears.

Joined by her friend Mark, who has been analyzing and enhancing the photographs, Kate discovers that the young girl's image can be found hidden in all the pictures she had taken. The trail of photographs leads Kate and Mark to the home of Walter, the domineering leader of the Boxhead cult. Walter bombards his guests with pompous opinions about porcupines, as his young wife Lisa silently cowers in his presence and vents her emotions on a turnip mash. After dinner, Walter overpowers his guests. Kate is chained in a basement dungeon and told to "smile for the camera" as she fights back her tears. Mark is taken to a remote place in the woods to be sacrificed in a Boxhead ritual. Mysteriously freed from her chains by the young piglet, Kate escapes and follows Walter into the teacup, where she fights for her life and exacts her revenge.

== Cast ==
- Erika Thormahlen as Kate
- Mark Sarosi as Mark
- Stephen Bender as Walter
- Kristin Victoria Barron as Lisa
- Helen Burgess as the psychic
- Mariah Balaban as the waitress
- Lawrence O’Toole as the motel clerk
- Mandy Capuano as the little girl
- Patrician Priola, Jennifer O’shea as the singers
- David Kahn as the keyboard player
- Jordan Galland as the guitar player
- Jemima Kirke singer
- Domino Kirke Singer

== Awards ==
The film won the Best Short ScreenCraft Award at the 2005 New York International Independent Film and Video Festival, and was shown at the 2005 Big Apple Core Film Festival.

== Production ==
Smile for the Camera was filmed during November 2004, on Long Island's south fork, with an all-volunteer cast and crew, using a Panasonic AG-DVX 100B Digital video camera. The DVD and music can be purchased from the movie's website

== Soundtrack ==
The film has an original musical score by Timo Ellis and Jordan Galland. The title song, "Smile for the Camera", was written by Galland and Sean Lennon, performed by Domino and Jemima Kirke, and produced by David Kahn. Additional music was created by Adam Crystal and David Mueller, former bandmates of Galland in the rock band, Dopo Yume.
