= FiraTàrrega =

Outdoor arts festival and market in Spain

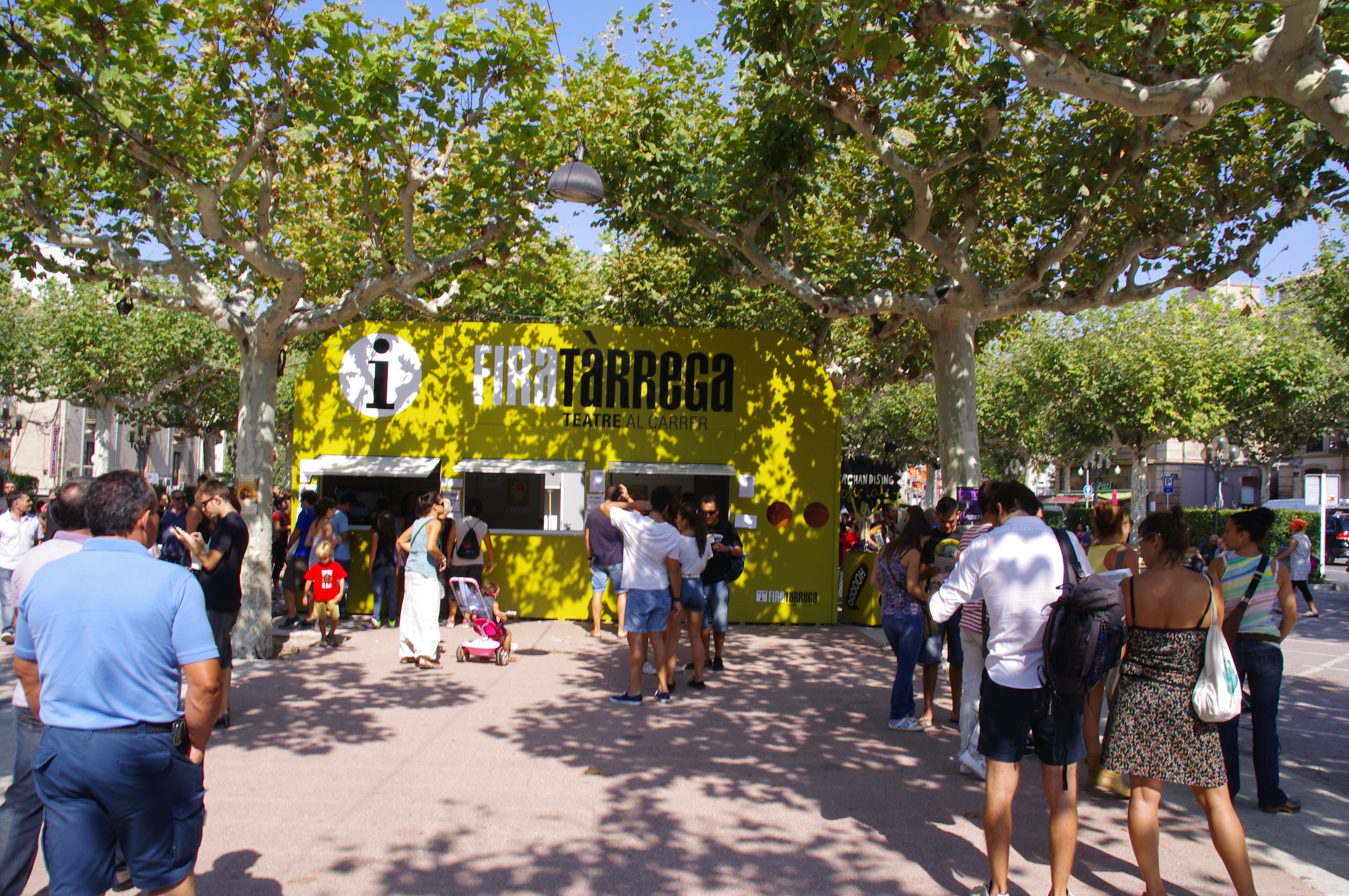
- Stand of information at FiraTàrrega
- Location: Tàrrega
- Opening date: 1981
- Developer: Eugeni Nadal
- Goods sold: Performing arts
- Days normally open: Second weekend in September
- Interactive map of FiraTàrrega

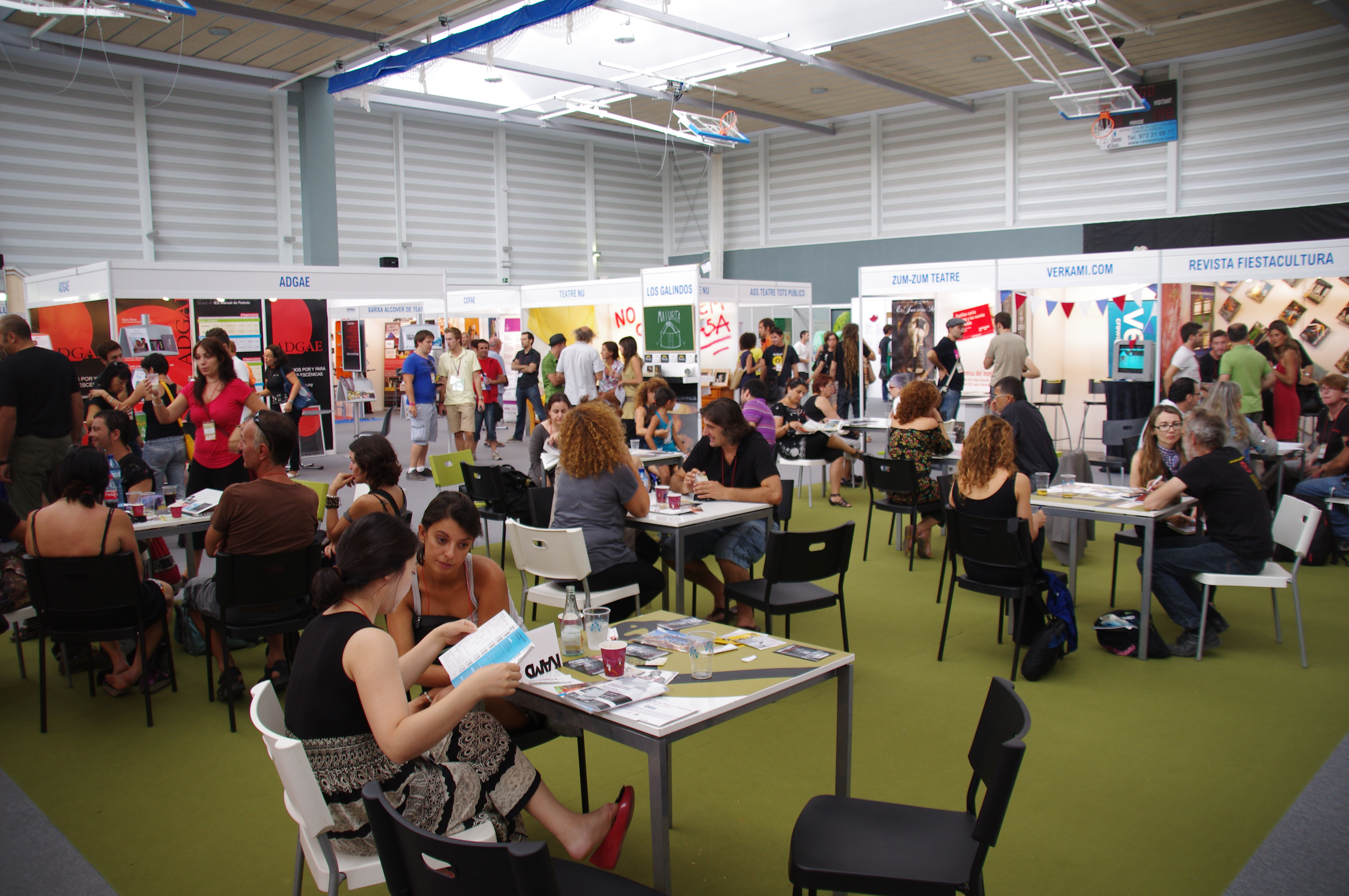
La Llotja, professional meeting at FiraTàrrega 2012

FiraTàrrega (also Fira de Teatre al Carrer de Tàrrega) is the international market for performing arts that takes place every year in Tàrrega during the second weekend in September. Founded in 1981, it is a great shop window of what is going on in performing arts, with special emphasis on street arts, visual and unconventional shows. As a meeting place and an international point of reference for debate, the main objective of FiraTàrrega is to boost the performing arts market, opening the door to the internationalisation of the companies. Other more specific objectives are the accompaniment and promotion of creations by emergent artists, encouraging training, focused on artistic creation and culture management and on generating strategic alliances to develop transnational street art circuits or productions.

The Fira de Teatre al Carrer de Tàrrega was born in 1981 thanks to the initiative of the then Mayor of Tarrega, Eugeni Nadal, and as the result of a confluence of ideas: that of converting the town's local festival into a grand fiesta; encouraging the people to take part and get involved and put the whole town to the service of a concrete project, in this case, for the theatre. To carry out this project, Nadal had, from the outset, the complicity of Xavier Fàbregas, Head of Servei de Cinematografia i Teatre at the Generalitat de Catalunya and Joan Font, director of Comediants.

At that precise historic moment, a series of factors contributed to getting this initial project of the ground:

- Politically, the restoration of democratic town councils after the first local elections, promoted the popular festivals and regained the street as a physical space for collective meetings and celebrations.
- In the cultural field, theatre companies and musical groups who reinforced this idea appeared in Catalonia. These include Comediants, founded in 1978, Vol Ras in 1980, La Vella Dixieland or El Tricicle. At the beginning of the 80s La Fura dels Baus, La Cubana, etc., also appeared.
- Geographically, Tàrrega is a town near the important urban centres but far enough away to mean staying there for a greater or lesser time.
- The calendar was also an element to keep in mind when organising la Fira. The fact that it coincided with the end of summer and the last weekend before the schools went back favoured the attendance.
- Finally, the medieval layout of the town allowed the organisers to concentrate the venues in the centre, which centralised the shows and bunched the audience together, making them into protagonists in the event.

== Bibliography ==
- AADD. "Tourism, branding and attractiveness of regions" dins Policy Handbook on How to strategically use the EU support programmes, including Structural Funds, to foster the potential of culture for local, regional and national development and the spill-over effects on the wider economy? Page 50 European Agenda for Culture. Work Plan for Culture 2011–2014. Working Group of UE Member States Experts on Cultural and Creative Industries. European Union, April 2012
- BADIA, Carmina; CLOP, Mercè i JUÁREZ, Francisco. Economia i cultura. Enquesta sobre l’impacte econòmic i anàlisi del públic de la 20a Fira de Teatre al Carrer de Tàrrega. Edició: Fira de Teatre de Tàrrega, Institut d’Estudis Ilerdencs i Caixa Catalunya. Col·lecció de la Llotja, 7. Tàrrega: 2001. ISBN 84-89943-49-4
- BURGUET ARDIACA, Francesc. "Les perifèries teatrals", into Barcelona, Metròpolis Mediterrània. Quadern Central, 17 (pages 91–94). Barcelona: Ajuntament de Barcelona, 1985 ISSN 0214-6215
- COLOMBO, Alba. "FiraTàrrega (Teatre al Carrer)". Pages 95 – 112, into Gestión cultural. Estudios de caso. (DDAA). Barcelona: Editorial Ariel, November 2008. ISBN 978-84-344-2226-1
- JUÁREZ RUBIO, Francisco; RIBALTA, Mike. "Fira de Teatre al Carrer de Tàrrega. Untersuchung der wirtschaftlichen Auswirkungen" Pages 93 – 104, into Handbuch Event-Kommunikation. Grundlagen und Best Practice für erfolgreiche Veranstaltungen. Erich Schmidt Verlag. Berlin: 2007. ISBN 978-3-503-10300-3
- JUÁREZ RUBIO, Francisco; RIBALTA, Mike. "Fira de Teatre al Carrer de Tàrrega. A performing arts market" Pàgs. 153 - 170, into Facets of contemporary event management. Theory & practice for event success. International University of Applied Sciences Bad Honnef. Bonn: 2008. ISBN 978-3-86796-027-4
- LLACUNA, Pau; OTAL, Mª Luisa i RIBERA, Eduard. Fira, festa, festival. Evolució d’un concepte. Informe històric de 20 anys de la Fira de Teatre al Carrer de Tàrrega. Edicions de la Universitat de Lleida. Lleida: 2003. ISBN 84-8409-973-3
- MARTÍ SAMBOLA, Oriol. "Cultura i perifèries. FiraTàrrega, per exemple". URTX. Revista Cultural de l'Urgell, 23. Museu Comarcal de l'Urgell. Tàrrega: 2009
- MARTÍ SAMBOLA, Oriol. "Ruralpower (o cómo centrarse en la periferia)”. Música para camaleones. El Black Album de la sostenibilidad cultural. Pages 94–97. Transit Projectes, February 2013 ISBN 978-84-615-9060-5. Digital version at http://musicaparacamaleones.transit.es
- MIR, Conxita; JARNE, Antonieta; SAGUÉS, Joan; VICEDO, Enric. Diccionari biogràfic de les Terres de Lleida. Política, economia, cultura i societat. Segle XX. Alfazeta. Lleida: 2010. ISBN 9788493771553
- MONTAÑÉS, Manel. "La Fira de Tàrrega. Crònica d'una transgressió". Pages 93–95 into Transversal. Revista de Cultura Contemporània, 3. Lleida: 1997 Departament de Cultura de l'Ajuntament de Lleida, June 1997. ISSN 1137-716X
- PÉREZ DE OLAGUER, Gonzalo. Fira de Teatre al Carrer • Tàrrega. RBA-La Magrana. Barcelona: 2005. ISBN 84-7871-495-2
