= Larry Keigwin =

American choreographer (born 1972)

- Born: 1972 (age 53–54)
- Education: Hofstra University (1994)
- Occupation: choreographer
- Known for: founder and artistic director of KEIGWIN + COMPANY

Larry Keigwin an American choreographer and the artistic director of KEIGWIN + COMPANY.

== Life and career ==
Keigwin was raised in Wading River on Long Island with three brothers, one of them his twin. Though his brothers were “very jocky,” he chose instead to pursue gymnastics, join a circus training program, and perform in school musicals. Keigwin auditioned for and performed in a number of “Club MTV” episodes before attending Hofstra University to study dance. Following graduation in 1994, he danced with artists including Penny Arcade, Robin Becker, David Roussève, Varla Jean Merman, Zvi Gotheiner, John Jasperse, Jane Comfort, Julie Taymor, Doug Elkins, Doug Varone, and Mark Dendy. It was this last artist, Dendy, who invited Keigwin to choreograph and perform a solo (what eventually became “Mattress Suite”) as part of Dendy's own program at the Joyce Theater. This opportunity launched Keigwin's career as a contemporary dance choreographer.

Larry Keigwin's work has been commissioned by Works & Process at the Guggenheim, The Juilliard School, The New York City Ballet's Choreographic Institute, and The Martha Graham Dance Company. He was the Vail International Dance Festival’s first artist in residence in 2010. He also staged the opening event of the 2010 Fashion Week, choreographed the musical Tales of the city and the off-Broadway production of RENT, worked with the pop band Fischerspooner, and held the role of associate choreographer for both The Radio City Rockettes and the Off-Broadway musical The Wild Party. Keigwin has also created Keigwin Kabaret, a fusion of modern dance, vaudeville, and burlesque presented by the Public Theater at Joe's Pub and by Symphony Space. He is a co-founder of the Green Box Arts Festival in Green Mountain Falls, Colorado, a multi-disciplinary festival designed to increase cultural opportunities in the region, as well as provide creative residencies to young, emerging choreographers.

== Keigwin + Company ==
Since K+C's premiere performance at Joyce Soho, Keigwin has created 16 dances, including the large-scale choreographic event Bolero and recent works such as Runaway (2008), the site-specific Sidewalk (2009) and Bird Watching (2010).

Over the past eight years, K+C has presented performances throughout New York City and nationwide at venues including The John F. Kennedy Center for the Performing Arts, Summerdance Santa Barbara, New York City Center, The Joyce Theater, the American Dance Festival, Bates Dance Festival, and more.

== Repertory ==
- Urban Birds (2002)
- Female Portraits (2002)
- Mattress Suite (2003)
- Angels of Anxiety (2004)
- Natural Selection (2004)
- Love Songs (2006)
- Caffeinated (2007)
- Elements (2008)
- Runaway (2008)
- Megalopolis (2009)
- Sidewalk (2009)
- Triptych (2009)
- Bird Watching (2010)
- Exit (2011)
- Trio (2011)
- Contact Sport (2012)
- 12 Chairs (2012)

== Reception ==
Keigwin's style, which toes the line between art and pop culture, has met with both positive and negative reviews.

New York Times journalist Roslyn Sulcas calls Keigwin's work “witty, kinetic and musically responsive, mixing the stretched lines of ballet with the more weighted, blunt quality of contemporary dance, often integrating everyday gestures and pop-culture references.”

The New York Press describes Keigwin's work as “witty, sexy, fashion-conscious and full of attitude while also being haunting.”

New York Times dance critic Gia Kourlas noted that Keigwin, in his massive community piece Bolero, “made a dance about a community add up to more than a community dance.”

New York Times dance critic Alastair Macaulay writes that Keigwin “has it in him to be an artist of rewarding originality...Most of the evening, however, suggests he finds it convenient to make choreography that is at best cute.”

Keigwin was named one of "25 to Watch" in 2004 by Dance Magazine.

== Awards ==
Larry Keigwin was one of the 2011 Society of Directors and Choreographers' Joe A. Callaway Award Recipients, which "recognizes excellence in the craft of directing and choreography during the New York City theatre season."

He was awarded the American Dance Festival's Doris Duke Award for New Work in 2004, 2006, 2008.

In 1999, he received a Bessie Award for his performance in Dream Analysis by Mark Dendy.
