= The Eureka E.P. =

EP by Grifters
- Released: May 1, 1995
- Recorded: January 1995, Shangri-La Records (store), Memphis, Tennessee
- Genre: Indie Rock
- Length: 21:55 (CD)
- Label: Shangri-La Records Shangri-La 013
- Producer: The Grifters, Doug Easley & Davis McCain

Grifters chronology
Crappin' You Negative (1994)	The Eureka E.P. (1995)	Ain't My Lookout (1996)

Professional ratings
Review scores
Source	Rating
Allmusic	3/5 stars

The Eureka E.P. is the third E.P. album by Memphis indie rock band The Grifters. Tripp Lamkins' liner notes state the reason for an EP instead of a full-length album:

"Well, after much touring, little band practice, a new young'un, 38 more Pavement comparisons, & the inevitable demise of the flower shop van, we bring you-an e.p. Hope no one feels slighted, but having 6 or 7 fewer songs to tear our greying hair out over will probably keep us together a long while. It was a pretty good year though. Touring with bands like Rodan(r.i.p.), Ruby Falls, Dambuilders, The Strapping Fieldhands, GBV, Ed Hall, Versus, Red Red Meat, & Jawbox kind of makes being away from Memphis worthwhile not to mention getting to meet so many good people all over the world. We sincerely love you and look forward to seeing you all again this year. And we will. Maybe we'll even have that lunch we're always talking about."

Also explained is the peculiar recording location of the album:

This recording is not only brought to you by Shangri-La Records again, but it was recorded there on 4-track. Once again it was sweetened at Easley studios by Doug & Davis.

== Track listing ==
All tracks are written by Stanley Gallimore, Tripp Lamkins, Dave Shouse and Scott Taylor, except where noted.

No.	Title	Writer(s)	Lead vocals	Length
1.	"Eureka I.V."		Dave Shouse	2:40
2.	"His Jesus Song"		Scott Taylor	2:34
3.	"Slow Day for the Cleaner"		Dave Shouse	4:18
4.	"Whatever Happened to Felix Cole"		Scott Taylor	2:24
5.	"Founder's Day Parade"	John Stivers	Dave Shouse	3:21
6.	"Banjo"		Scott Taylor	2:56
7.	"X-Ray Hip"		Dave Shouse	3:42
Total length:				21:55

== Album credits ==
=== Grifters ===
- Stanley Gallimore
- Tripp Lamkins
- Dave Shouse
- Scott Taylor

=== Additional musicians ===
- John Stivers (Impala) - Guitar on Founder's Day
- Melissa Dunn - Backing Vocals on X-Ray
- Roy Berry (The Simple Ones) - Percussion on Banjo
- Doug Easley - Slide Guitar on Eureka I.V.

=== Additional credits ===
- Settlement of Cover Concept Dispute by GBV
- Layout by Paul Ringger Jr.
- Disc Art by Johnny Taylor
- Photography by Dan Ball
