= Those Bastard Souls =

American rock band (1995–2001)

- Origin: United States
- Genres: Alternative Rock, indie Rock
- Years active: 1995–2001
- Labels: Darla, V2
- Past members: Dave Shouse, Joan Wasser, Matt Fields, Michael Tighe, Kevin March

Those Bastard Souls were an American independent rock band formed in 1995 as a solo side project by David Shouse of The Grifters. The name, somewhat of a nod to These Immortal Souls, was one that David Shouse coined as a replacement for A Band Called Bud, the original name of the Grifters. Shouse liked the name and held onto it, imagining a rotating roster of transient "bastard musicians" that would comprise a musical project that he might lead sometime in the future.

While recording the Grifters' first album for Sub Pop, Ain't My Lookout, Shouse was approached by someone from Darla Records with some DAT tapes and told that they would put out a solo album for him if he were interested. While the recording of Ain't My Lookout was pleasurable, Shouse, the eldest Grifter by almost a decade, was finding himself increasingly frustrated with the lyrics that he wrote for that band; finding them too abstract and not personal enough for where he found himself personally. Under the "Those Bastard Souls" moniker he felt that he had a place for his more direct, personal material.

== Twentieth Century Chemical ==
1996's Twentieth Century Chemical was recorded with his friends at Easley McCain Recording, Doug Easley, Davis McCain and engineer Stuart Sikes. Grifters drummer Stanley Gallimore also contributed on some tracks, including a 'sequel' to the Grifters song "Subterranean Death Ride Blues", titled "Subterranean Death Ride Blues, Pt.2" The album's liner notes are cryptic and minimalist: no personnel is given; along with Easley McCain, five European studios are listed; and David Shouse is credited under the pseudonym "Will David".

== Tour ==
Those Bastard Souls were offered the opening slot for Sebadoh's 1997 tour and Shouse and Red Red Meat's Matt Fields pulled together a band composed of Trenchmouth drummer and future Saturday Night Live star Fred Armisen, and longtime friends Joan Wasser of The Dambuilders, Steven Golub, and The Flaming Lips' multi-instrumentalist and drummer, Steven Drozd.

== Debt & Departure ==
Following the tragic May 29, 1997 drowning of Jeff Buckley, who was both a friend of Shouse's and Wasser's lover, Those Bastard Souls diverged from the "bastard musician" concept, and entered the studio as a proper band. To record Debt & Departure, Shouse, Wasser and Fields were joined by Jeff Buckley guitarist Michael Tighe and Dambuilders drummer Kevin March. The album, released in 1999, saw the band retreading a full third of the debut album and also included a piano ballad version of "Spaced Out", a song that appeared less than a year earlier on the Grifters' Full Blown Possession. Though the Grifters occasionally played shows together again, the recording of Debt & Departure and the touring that followed effectively placed the band on permanent hiatus.

== Bloodthirsty Lovers ==
Those Bastard Souls seems to have been abandoned by 2001 as that year saw yet another direction for Shouse, as he began recording new solo material on synthesizers and keyboards in his attic as Bloodthirsty Lovers, named for another track from the Grifters' Full Blown Possession. After a self-produced, self-titled album on French Kiss Records, Shouse recorded again with Kevin March, this time joining forces with Big Ass Truck's Steve Selvidge. 2003 saw the trio touring with The Flaming Lips, as well as playing opening slots for Modest Mouse and Guided by Voices (which March would later join). The Delicate Seam EP was released the following year.

== Members ==
- Dave Shouse : vocals, guitar, piano, keyboard, songwriter
- Joan Wasser: violin, vocals
- Matt Fields : bass, piano, vocals
- Michael Tighe : guitars
- Kevin March : drums, percussion

== Recording and tour members ==
- Doug Easley : various instruments
- Davis McCain : various instruments
- Stan Gallimore : drums
- Steven Drozd : drums, horns, keyboards, guitars
- Fred Armisen : drums
- Steven Golub : saxophone, gobolobophone, tapes, percussion

== Discography ==
- Twentieth Century Chemical, (Darla Records 1996)
- Debt & Departure (V2 Records, 1999)
