= The Kingdom of Jones =

The Kingdom Of Jones

EP by Grifters
- Released: 1991
- Recorded: 1991, Easley McCain Recording, Memphis, Tennessee
- Genre: Indie rock, alternative rock, art rock
- Length: 16:14 (7") (EP)
- Label: Doink
- Producer: The Grifters

Grifters chronology
Disfigurehead (1990)	The Kingdom Of Jones (1991)	So Happy Together (1992)

The Kingdom Of Jones is the second 7" EP by indie rock band The Grifters. Shangri-La Records re-released the first two Grifters singles in 1996 as The Doink Years 10" and again on CD in 2006. The song "Snake Oil" features the debut of Stan Gallimore on drums, establishing the Grifters as four-piece for the rest of their career.

== Track listing ==
All tracks are written by Stan Gallimore, Tripp Lamkins, David Shouse and Scott Taylor.

Side A
No.	Title	Lead vocals	Length
1.	"Encrusted"	David Shouse	3:39
2.	"Another Song"	Scott Taylor	3:45

Side B
No.	Title	Lead vocals	Length
1.	"Snake Oil"	Scott Taylor	5:16
2.	"Daydream Riot"	David Shouse	3:37

== Album credits ==
=== Grifters ===
- Stan Gallimore
- Tripp Lamkins
- David Shouse
- Scott Taylor
