= Disfigurehead =

EP by Grifters
- Released: 1990
- Recorded: 1990, Easley McCain Recording, Memphis, Tennessee
- Genre: Indie Rock
- Length: 13:31 (7") (EP)
- Label: Doink
- Producer: The Grifters

Grifters chronology
Dad (1989)	Disfigurehead (1990)	The Kingdom of Jones (1991)

Disfigurehead is the first 7" EP by Memphis indie rock band the Grifters. The band was still a trio and the dynamics were not dissimilar from their A Band Called Bud incarnation, except that the production was more polished and the effects were toned down so that the guitars had a rougher edge.

Shangri-La Records re-released the first two Grifters singles in 1996 as The Doink Years 10" and again on CD in 2006.

== Track listing ==
All tracks are written by Tripp Lamkins, David Shouse and Scott Taylor.

Side A
No.	Title	Lead vocals	Length
1.	"Disfigurehead"	David Shouse	3:18
2.	"Need You"	Scott Taylor	3:48

Side B
No.	Title	Lead vocals	Length
1.	"Reason Enough"	David Shouse	1:36
2.	"How Long"	Scott Taylor	3:49

== Album credits ==
=== Grifters ===
- Tripp Lamkins
- David Shouse
- Scott Taylor
