= Big Ass Truck =

American rock band

- Genres: Hip-hop, Rock, funk
- Labels: Upstart, Yep Roc, Peabody, Terminus
- Past members: Colin Butler; Robby Grant; Robert Barnett; Steve Selvidge; John C. Stubblefield; Grayson Grant; Joe Boone; Dros Liposcak; Alex Greene; Chris Parker; Ross Rice

Big Ass Truck (BAT) is an American rock band from Memphis, Tennessee which incorporates elements of hip-hop, rock, funk and psychedelia in their music. The band includes a DJ spinning records, that provides beats, loops, and samples during recordings and live performances. The group disbanded sometime after the release of the 2001 album The Rug; however, as of 2021, the band has been playing live shows again.

== Lineup ==
The founding members of Big Ass Truck included drummer Robert Barnett, DJ Colin Butler, bassist Joe Boone, keyboardist Alex Greene, singer/guitarist Robby Grant and singer/guitarist Steve Selvidge. The line-up changed throughout the 90s, including bass players such as Lucero's/Jello 1-2-3's John C. Stubblefield, Grayson Grant and Dros Liposack, as well as keyboard player Chris Parker. At times, the band also included producer Ross Rice.

== History ==
In 1995, Big Ass Truck released their self-titled debut album. Soon after, the group toured with 311 throughout the American South, among others. In 1996 they released the album Kent. The band also released an E.P. on Yep Roc entitled Sack Lunch. Under the name "Big Angelic Truck" the band recorded two Christmas songs, "Do You Hear What I Hear" and "Holly Jolly Christmas" for a local charity. Later these songs were released as a limited edition single.

The band's 2000 release, Who Let You In Here?, was described by one reviewer as "a clunky junk-shop mixture of sounds and styles". In 2001, the group released the album The Rug, and appeared on MTV's Oddville and 120 Minutes.

Band member Robby Grant was involved in a solo project under the name Vending Machine but now performs under his own name. He also plays guitar in the band MouseRocket with former Big Ass Truck bandmate Robert Barnett and guitarist/vocalist/songwriter Alicja Trout of The Lost Sounds and River City Tanlines. In 2019 he released Mellotron Variations with John Medeski, Pat Sansone and Jonathan Kirskcey. Steve Selvidge has recorded and toured with The Bloodthirsty Lovers along with Dave Shouse who is the former member of Memphis lo-fi rockers Grifters and Those Bastard Souls. In 2006, Selvidge produced, co-wrote, and released "The Service is Spectacular" by The Secret Service . From 2007 to 2010 he recorded and toured with Amy Lavere. He now plays guitar with The Hold Steady. Joe Boone owned and ran the Other Door Studio in Birmingham, AL, but moved back to Memphis in 2007, where he has been a writer for many Memphis publications and websites, writing especially about music. Boone was the music editor for The Memphis Flyer from 2013-2015.

The band held a reunion show February 13, 2014 at The 1884 Lounge at Minglewood Hall in Memphis.

They got back together once more on June 4, 2016 at Memphis' Levitt Shell with Ross Rice.

== Discography ==
- Big Ass Truck (1995, Upstart)
- Kent (1996, Upstart)
- Sack Lunch (1997, Yep Roc)
- Who Let You in Here? (1998, Peabody)
- The Rug (2001, Terminus)
- All You Can Handle (2023, Terminus)

Compilations

- On Air: Live Music From The WEVL Archives 1996 SCV
- Memphis in the Meantime 1995 Gravelsauce Records
