= Crappin' You Negative =

Studio album by Grifters
- Released: 1994
- Recorded: January 1994 at Easley McCain Recording & Here and There, Memphis, Tennessee
- Genre: Indie Rock, lo-fi
- Length: 48:36 (CD)
- Label: Shangri-La Records (Shangri-La 008); Fat Possum Records (Reissue)
- Producer: The Grifters & Shangri-La Records

Grifters chronology
One Sock Missing (1993)	Crappin' You Negative (1994)	The Eureka E.P. (1995)

2016 Reissue album cover

Professional ratings
Review scores
Source	Rating
AllMusic	4.5/5 stars
Pitchfork (Reissue)	7.9/10
Rolling Stone	4/5 stars

Crappin' You Negative is the third full-length album from Grifters and was released on Shangri-La Records. The album was reissued as a remastered version in 2016, by Fat Possum Records.

== Track listing ==
All tracks are written by Stan Gallimore, Tripp Lamkins, David Shouse and Scott Taylor.

No.	Title	Lead vocals	Length
1.	"Rats"	Scott Taylor/David Shouse	3:46
2.	"Maps of the Sun"	David Shouse	3:52
3.	"Dead Already"	David Shouse	4:18
4.	"Black Fuel Incinerator"	David Shouse	3:18
5.	"Skin Man Palace"	David Shouse	3:03
6.	"Arizona"	Scott Taylor	1:51
7.	"Felt-Tipped Over"	David Shouse	4:22
8.	"Holmes"	Scott Taylor	2:58
9.	"Get Outta That Spaceship and Fight Like a Man"	David Shouse	4:45
10.	"Piddlebach"	(instrumental)	1:57
11.	"Bronze Cast"	David Shouse	3:51
12.	"Junkie Blood"	David Shouse	4:13
13.	"Here Comes Larry"	(instrumental)	2:06
14.	"Cinnamon"	Scott Taylor	4:08

== Album credits ==
=== Grifters ===
- Stan Gallimore
- Tripp Lamkins
- David Shouse
- Scott Taylor

=== Additional musicians ===
- David Hall – Didgeridoo on Piddlebach
- Joseph Pegram (611) – Moaning on Piddlebach
- John Stivers (Impala) – Guitar on Here Comes Larry

=== Additional information ===
- Cover art by Tripp Lamkins
- Back cover and interior art by David Hall
- Graphic design by Paul W. Ringger Jr.
- Recorded at Easley Studios by The Grifters and Doug Easley and Davis McCain
- "Dead Already", "Arizona" and "Piddlebach" recorded at Scott's on 4-track
- "Here Comes Larry" recorded at Easley's on 4-track
- "Black Fuel Incinerator" rhythm section recorded on 4-track in a Memphis parking garage across the street from The Flower Shop

=== Album trivia ===
- The CD also carries the inscription of "Doink Records, 1993" under the © & ℗
