= Xtra-Acme USA =

Studio album by the Jon Spencer Blues Explosion
- Released: September 14, 1999
- Genre: Punk blues
- Length: 73:58
- Label: Matador Records

The Jon Spencer Blues Explosion chronology
Acme (1998)	Xtra-Acme USA (1999)	Plastic Fang (2002)

Professional ratings
Review scores
Source	Rating
AllMusic	3.5/5 stars
Pitchfork	7.1/10

Xtra-Acme USA is the US follow up to the album Acme by the group the Jon Spencer Blues Explosion. It is a collection of B-sides and remixes of songs originally appearing on the main album. This release differs slightly from the UK version, called Acme Plus. Two tracks from Xtra-Acme USA are not included in Acme Plus ("Lovin' Machine (Automator)" and "Calvin (Zebra Ranch)"); however, the same is true for the Acme Plus album. Two of the tracks contained on it ("Right Place, Wrong Time" and "I Wanna Make it All Right (Zebra Ranch)") are not on Xtra-Acme USA.

== Artwork ==
The album cover features actress Winona Ryder, who starred in the music video for "Talk About The Blues", which appeared in the band's sixth studio album, Acme.

== Track listings ==
=== Xtra-Acme USA ===
1. "Wait a Minute" - 3:48
2. "Get Down Lover" - 3:47
3. "Confused" - 3:04
4. "Magical Colors (31 Flavors)" - 4:09
5. "Not Yet" - 4:08
6. "Get Old" - 1:46
7. "Bacon" - 3:32
8. "Blue Green Olga [Remix]" - 4:30
9. "Heavy [Remix]" - 3:13
10. "Lap Dance" - 3:26
11. "Leave Me Alone So I Can Rock Again" - 5:06
12. "Soul Trance" - 4:28
13. "Electricity" - 2:30
14. "New Year" - 2:58
15. "Lovin' Machine (Automator)" - 3:39
16. "Chowder" - 3:16
17. "T.A.T.B. [For the Saints and the Sinners Remix]" - 7:29
18. "Hell" - 3:25
19. "Calvin (Zebra Ranch)" - 4:08
20. [Unlisted Track/Radio Advert for Acme] - 1:36

=== Acme Plus ===
1. "Wait a Minute" - 3:48
2. "Get Down Lover" - 3:47
3. "Confused" - 3:04
4. "Magical Colors (31 Flavors)" - 4:09
5. "Not Yet" - 4:08
6. "Get Old" - 1:46
7. "Bacon" - 3:32
8. "Blue Green Olga [Remix]" - 4:30
9. "Heavy [Remix]" - 3:13
10. "Lap Dance" - 3:26
11. "Right Place, Wrong Time" - 3:41
12. "Leave Me Alone So I Can Rock Again" - 5:06
13. "Soul Trance" - 4:28
14. "Electricity" - 2:30
15. "New Year" - 2:58
16. "Chowder" - 3:16
17. "T.A.T.B. [For the Saints and the Sinners Remix]" - 7:29
18. "Hell" - 3:25
19. "I Wanna Make it All Right (Zebra Ranch)" - 3:50
20. [Unlisted Track/Radio Advert for Acme] - 1:36
