= One Sock Missing =

1993 studio album by Grifters

Studio album by Grifters
- Released: 1993
- Recorded: 1992
- Studios: The Flower Shop and Easley McCain, Memphis, Tennessee
- Genres: Indie Rock, lo-fi
- Length: 44:59 (CD)
- Labels: Shangri-La; Shangri-La 004
- Producers: The Grifters, Shangri-La Records

Grifters chronology
So Happy Together (1992)	One Sock Missing (1993)	Crappin' You Negative (1994)

One Sock Missing is the second album by the American band the Grifters, released in 1993 on Shangri-La Records. The album was an underground hit. It was reissued by Fat Possum Records in 2016.

== Production ==
The album was in part recorded at Easley McCain Recording, in Memphis, Tennessee. "I Arise" is a bonus track on the vinyl format of the album.

== Critical reception ==
Professional ratings
Review scores
Source	Rating
AllMusic	4/5 stars

Trouser Press wrote that "Shouse and Taylor (who split vocals) often slip into a laconic saunter that’s a little too close for comfort to Pavement frontman Stephen Malkmus’ slacker slump." Billboard called "Corolla Hoist" "one of the great lofi singles." The Staten Island Advance praised the band's "process of chopping, skewing, rearranging and mixing the standard formulas of various musical genres into a whole new ball of wax."

AllMusic stated: "Certainly the most low-key (if not lo-fi) of the Grifters' early records, 1993's One Sock Missing is less noisy and aggressive than its immediate predecessor, So Happy Together." Magnet noted: "Few indie-rock groups of this time pulled off such an emotionally cathartic and powerful mix of desperate darkness, dynamic heaviness, convincingly abstract drug-influenced weirdness, unbelievably infectious and gorgeous hooks, real wall-shredding sheets of noise and discordance, and low-key every-guy approachability."

== Track listing ==
All tracks are written by Stank Gallimore, Tripp Lampshade, Diamond Dave Shouse and Slim Taylor.

No.	Title	Lead vocals	Length
1.	"Bummer"	Diamond Dave Shouse	2:53
2.	"She Blows Blasts of Static"	Shouse	4:04
3.	"Shark"	Taylor	4:16
4.	"Teenage Jesus"	Tripp Lampshade	3:02
5.	"Side"	Taylor	2:50
6.	"#1"	Shouse	1:16
7.	"Tupelo Moan"	Shouse	5:06
8.	"Wonder"	Taylor	1:20
9.	"Corolla Hoist"	Shouse	4:02
10.	"Encrusted"	Taylor/Shouse	2:19
11.	"The Casual Years"	Shouse	3:19
12.	"Sain"	Taylor	2:28
13.	"Just Passing Out"	Shouse	3:21
14.	"I Arise"	Taylor	4:35
Total length:			44:59

== Album credits ==
Grifters credited as

- Stank Gallimore
- Tripp Lampshade
- Diamond Dave Shouse
- Slim Taylor

Additional musicians

- Greg Easterly (Compulsive Gamblers) – Violins and Bass on Wonder

Skronkadelic Orchestra Unlimited on I Arise

- Jack Adcock – Gourd
- Jimmy Enck – Sax in Tune
- Robert Gordon – Jamming Untensil
- Fields Trimble (Compulsive Gamblers) – Saxophone

sitting in

- Jim Cole – Kwirrr Machine
- Sherman Willmott (Shangri-La Records) – Bike Horn
- Roy Berry (The Simple Ones)

Additional credits

- Largely recorded at the Flower Shop by Roy Berry
- Additional recording and mixing at Easley Studios by Doug Easley & Davis McCain
- Album and disc art by Roy Berry
- Cover drawing by Tripp Lamkins
- Cover design by Paul W. Ringger XXIV
- Paintings of the Grifters as a young band by Kelly
- Cover production by Towery Publishing
