= Experimental Remixes =

Extended play by Jon Spencer Blues Explosion

EP by Jon Spencer Blues Explosion
- Released: Apr 18, 2000
- Recorded: 1993–1994, Water Works Studio, NYC
- Genre: Punk blues, alternative rock
- Label: (United States) Matador (United Kingdom) Mute
- Producer: Jon Spencer, Jim Waters

Jon Spencer Blues Explosion chronology
The Sound of the Future is Here Today!	Experimental Remixes	Techno Animal Remixes

Professional ratings
Review scores
Source	Rating
AllMusic	3/5 stars

Experimental Remixes is an EP by American punk blues band The Jon Spencer Blues Explosion released in 1995 by Matador Records which consists of six remixes of the group's songs and a hidden bonus track called "Tour Diary". A secondary pressing by Matador increased the length of the "Tour Diary" track to 17 minutes from its original 7 minute length, but the artwork and catalog numbers are identical. Five years after the EP was originally released on Matador, it was reissued by Mute Records in the UK with three additional remixes.

== Track listing for 1995 Matador Release ==
1. "Bellbottoms (Old Rascal Mix)" remix by UNKLE
2. "Flavor Part 1" remix by Beck, Mario Caldato Jr. and Mike D
3. "Flavor Part 2" remix by Beck, Mario Caldato Jr. and Mike D
4. "Soul Typecast" remix by Dub Narcotic Sound System
5. "Greyhound Part 1" remix by Moby
6. "Greyhound Part 2" remix by GZA, featuring Killah Priest
7. Bonus track, also known as "Tour Diary"

== Track listing for 2000 Mute Release ==
1. "Bellbottoms (Old Rascal Mix)" remix by UNKLE
2. "Flavor Part 1" remix by Beck, Mario Caldato Jr. and Mike D
3. "Flavor Part 2" remix by Beck, Mario Caldato Jr. and Mike D
4. "Soul Typecast" remix by Dub Narcotic Sound System
5. "Greyhound Part 1" remix by Moby
6. "Greyhound Part 2" remix by GZA, featuring Killah Priest
7. "Tour Diary"
8. "Implosion" remix by MC HyperCRad
9. "Explo" remix by John Oswald
10. "Blues 'XXX' Man" remix by Prince Paul
