= Ain't My Lookout =

Studio album by Grifters
- Released: February 1996
- Recorded: 1996, Easley McCain Recording, Memphis, Tennessee
- Genre: Indie Rock
- Length: 47:19 (CD)
- Label: Sub Pop Records SPCD 337; Shangri-La Records Shangri-La 017
- Producer: The Grifters, Davis McCain & Doug Easley

Grifters chronology
The Eureka E.P. (1995)	Ain't My Lookout (1996)	Full Blown Possession (1997)

Professional ratings
Review scores
Source	Rating
AllMusic	3/5 stars
Robert Christgau	(Honorable Mention)

Ain't My Lookout is the fourth full-length album by Memphis indie rock band The Grifters, and their first for Sub Pop Records. While Sub Pop released the Compact Disc, the Grifters remained true to their old home, Shangri-La Records, which was able to receive the licensing for the vinyl release. The vinyl LP release is now out of print. The album marked a stylistic change in the band's sound, with the lo-fi sound featured on previous albums being devoid on this release.

== Critical reception ==
The album received generally favorable reviews. The album was given a 6/10 by Stephen Thomas Erlewine of AllMusic, describing it as their 'tightest and cleanest' record to date. While stating that despite the higher production value, the band still stay committed to their lo-fi sound and refrain from selling out. Christgau also describes the effort as “Southern-fried hipsters uproot some pavement.” The album received a 2-star honorable mention, describing it as a “likable effort consumers attuned to its overriding aesthetic or individual vision may well enjoy.”

== Track listing ==
All tracks are written by Stanley Gallimore, Tripp Lamkins, Dave Shouse and Scott Taylor.

No.	Title	Lead vocals	Length
1.	"Covered With Flies"	Dave Shouse	2:40
2.	"Parting Shot"	Scott Taylor	2:46
3.	"Mysterious Friends"	Dave Shouse	4:04
4.	"Boho/Alt"	Scott Taylor	3:56
5.	"Pretty Notes"	Scott Taylor	3:12
6.	"Day Shift"	Scott Taylor	3:16
7.	"Last Man Alive"	Dave Shouse	2:34
8.	"My Apology"	Dave Shouse	3:06
9.	"The Straight Time"	Dave Shouse	4:19
10.	"Return to Cinder"	Scott Taylor	4:47
11.	"Give Yourself to Me"	Scott Taylor	3:25
12.	"Fixed in The Sky"	(instrumental)	3:50
13.	"Radio City Suicide"	Dave Shouse	5:48
Total length:			47:19

== Album credits ==
=== Grifters ===
- Stanley Gallimore
- Tripp Lamkins
- Dave Shouse
- Scott Taylor

=== Additional musicians ===
- Joan Wasser (Dambuilders) – Violin on “Fixed In The Sky” and “Radio City Suicide”
- Michael Graber (Professor Elixir's Southern Troubadours) – Mandolin on “Pretty Notes”
- Paulette Regan (Professor Elixir's Southern Troubadours) – Vocals on “Pretty Notes”
- Davis McCain – Guitar on “Last Man Alive”

=== Additional credits ===
- Cover art and illustrations by Jim Woodring Hillbilly Rampage
- Photography by Dan Ball
