= Damage (Blues Explosion album) =

Studio album by Blues Explosion
- Released: 2004
- Recorded: September 27, 2004
- Genre: Punk blues, alternative rock
- Length: 39:46
- Label: Sanctuary Records
- Producer: Steve Jordan & Jon Spencer

Blues Explosion chronology
Plastic Fang (2002)	Damage (2004)	Meat + Bone (2012)

Professional ratings
Review scores
Source	Rating
AllMusic	4/5 stars
JamBase	
The Music Box	3.5/5 stars

Damage is the eighth studio album by American punk blues band Blues Explosion, released in 2004. This is the first album that the band has released under the abbreviated name "Blues Explosion" rather than their previous name, "The Jon Spencer Blues Explosion". Spencer said about the band name change:

"It's always been a band, never a solo project, The name change honors a band that allows the three of us to make music for a while. It may not be the best thing to do. Sometimes we shoot ourselves in the foot. The Blues Explosion is kind of a punk rock band. We do what we want."

The album featured vocals from Martina Topley-Bird and Chuck D. Steve Jordan, Jay Braun, Dan the Automator, David Holmes and DJ Shadow were the producers of the album.

The UK vinyl and CD/DVD as well as the US enhanced CD releases of Damage were in a matchbook-style design. The Enhanced section contains a 22-minute film directed by Niko Tavernese (Exclusive studio footage of the band with various producers recording Damage).

== Track listing ==
1. "Damage" – 2:25
2. "Burn It Off" – 2:56
3. "Spoiled" – 3:33
4. "Crunchy" – 3:40
5. "Hot Gossip" – 3:31
6. "Mars, Arizona" – 2:25
7. "You Been My Baby" – 3:22
8. "Rivals" – 1:55
9. "Help These Blues" – 3:50
10. "Fed Up and Low Down" – 4:06
11. "Rattling" – 4:17
12. "Blowing My Mind" – 3:46
