= Boot Party =

Studio album by Dub Narcotic Sound System
- Released: 1996
- Studio: Dub Narcotic
- Genres: Alternative rock, dub
- Length: 42:16
- Label: K

Dub Narcotic Sound System chronology
Boot Party (1996)	Out of Your Mind (1998)

Boot Party is the first studio album by American alternative rock group Dub Narcotic Sound System. It was released on K Records in 1996.

== Critical reception ==
Professional ratings
Review scores
Source	Rating
AllMusic	3/5 stars
CMJ New Music Monthly	favorable
Snoozer	favorable

Trouser Press wrote that "when not delving deep into the usual sorts of ambient studio trickery, the songs hit a ’60s R&B stride, bathing in the stoned soul picnic ambience with uplifting spirit."

== Track listing ==
1. "Test Pattern" - 1:36
2. "Monkey Hips and Rice" - 4:17
3. "Ship to Shore" - 5:24
4. "Super Dub Narcotic" - 5:04
5. "Afi Tione" - 3:05
6. "Shake a Puddin" - 5:29
7. "King Harvester" - 0:56
8. “Robotica" - 4:49
9. "Bunny Echo" - 3:30
10. "Boot Party" - 8:06

== Personnel ==
- Larry Butler – drums
- Lindy Coyne – guitar
- Calvin Johnson – melodica
- Lois Maffeo – voice
- Todd Ranslow – bass
- Jen Smith – voice
- Brian Weber – guitar, organ
- DJ Sayeed – turntables
