= Full Blown Possession =

1997 studio album by Grifters

Studio album by Grifters
- Released: September 9, 1997
- Recorded: 1997
- Studios: Easley McCain and Sun, Memphis, Tennessee
- Genre: Indie rock
- Length: 54:08 (CD)
- Label: Sub Pop SPCD 402
- Producers: Grifters, Doug Easley, Davis McCain, John Neil Martin

Grifters chronology
Ain't My Lookout (1995)	Full Blown Possession (1997)

Full Blown Possession is the fifth and last full-length album by Memphis indie rock band Grifters, released in 1997.

== Production ==
The band recorded five of the album's songs at Sun Studios, in Memphis, Tennessee. The album was produced by Doug Easley, Davis McCain, John Neil Martin and the band.

== Critical reception ==
Professional ratings
Review scores
Source	Rating
AllMusic	4/5 stars
The Encyclopedia of Popular Music	3/5 stars
MusicHound Rock: The Essential Album Guide	3.5/5 stars
Pitchfork Media	8.4/10
Rolling Stone	3/5 stars

The Memphis Flyer wrote that "the record includes most of the hallmarks of the band's sound -- like driving, chuka-chuka bass lines, tantalizing leads lurking just beneath the surface, and their distinctive staggering tempos." The Washington Post wrote: "Although not as broken-down and freaked-out as the band's apparent model, Alex Chilton's Like Flies on Sherbert, the album is ramshackle and atmospheric just as often as it's hot-blooded and direct." The Chicago Reader wrote that "the Grifters place their bets solidly on jagged pop hooks, off-kilter blues structures, and keen dynamics--much like the Rolling Stones of yore."

The Chicago Tribune called the album "excellent" and "a no-nonsense uppercut of venomous Memphis R&B and darkly melodic rock that'll leave you drinking through a straw." The Austin Chronicle wrote that the band sticks "to what they know: a world that's slightly spooky and more than a bit seedy, where rough-edged riffs weave together with a disconcerting delicacy and singer Scott Taylor's eloquent trash talk." CMJ New Music Monthly thought that "other rock bands may play the blues, but the Grifters really mess with it."

== Track listing ==
All tracks are written by Stan Gallimore, Tripp Lamkins, Dave Shouse and Scott Taylor.

No.	Title	Lead vocals	Length
1.	"Re-Entry Blues"	Dave Shouse	3:56
2.	"Fireflies"	Scott Taylor	4:18
3.	"Spaced Out"	Dave Shouse	4:52
4.	"Centuries"	Scott Taylor	4:28
5.	"Sweetest Thing"	Scott Taylor	5:06
6.	"Happy"	Dave Shouse	5:26
7.	"Wickedthing"	Scott Taylor	4:48
8.	"Bloody Thirsty Lovers"	Dave Shouse	3:00
9.	"Hours"	Scott Taylor	4:19
10.	"You Be the Stranger"	(instrumental)	4:47
11.	"Cigarette"	Scott Taylor	4:38
12.	"Contact Me Now"	Dave Shouse	5:28
Total length:			54:08

The song "Spaced Out" was re-recorded by Dave Shouse in 1999 for his solo project Those Bastard Souls.

== Album credits ==
Grifters

- Stan Gallimore – Drums
- Tripp Lamkins – Bass, Guitar, Moog, Electric Piano
- Dave Shouse – Vocals, Guitar, Piano, Clavinet, Harmonica
- Scott Taylor – Vocals, Guitar, Organ, Mellotron

Additional musicians

- Doug Easley – Weird Sound on “Centuries”
- John Stivers (Impala) – Guitar on “You Be the Stranger”
- Skronkadelic Rhythm Factory – on “Contact Me Now”

Additional credits

- Photography by Dan Ball
- Chair Painting by Tobin Sprout
- Full Blown Possession cover drawing by Tripp Lamkins
- Layout mostly by J. Saaed
- Recorded by Doug Easley, Davis McCain and Stuart Sikes at Easley's, Memphis, Tennessee (2,4,5,7,9,10,12)
- Recorded by John Neil Martin and Jenny Hall at Sun Studios Beale Street, Memphis, Tennessee (1,3,6,8,11)
- Mixed by Nick Sansano
- Mastered by John Golden at John Gold Mastering, Newbury Park, California
