= A Reverse Willie Horton =

Studio album by The Jon Spencer Blues Explosion
- Released: 1992
- Recorded: 1992
- Genre: Punk blues, alternative rock
- Label: Pubic Pop Can
- Producer: Kramer

The Jon Spencer Blues Explosion chronology
A Reverse Willie Horton (1992)	The Jon Spencer Blues Explosion (1992)

A Reverse Willie Horton is either the debut album, or an early bootleg album, by the New York City-based Jon Spencer Blues Explosion. Few copies of the album were produced; many songs appear on the group's next album, 1992's The Jon Spencer Blues Explosion, albeit in a different mix or recording altogether (the sound of A Reverse Willie Horton is closer to Crypt Style). All three albums are made up of tracks recorded in 1991 by producer Kramer and engineer Steve Albini (in separate sessions).

The album was released as a black vinyl LP in an edition of 500 copies. The front and rear art work are two separate images pasted onto a plain black card sleeve (with the exception of white text reading 'JACKET ME IN CANA' on the rear).

During an interview with Fiz Magazine (Issue #5), Spencer discussed the various editions of the first album and hinted at the origins of the release: "When I was travelling around with the Gibson Bros. last year I had a tape of that with me because we had just done it. I let a few people dub it so maybe something came from that."

== Critical reception ==
Dave Thompson, in Alternative Rock, called the album "deliciously downplayed racket, purposely recorded to sound like a pile of old blues records, rattling through the cheapest speakers in the world." Spin acknowledged the mystery surrounding the recording and called it better than anything that Spencer's former band, Pussy Galore, had ever released.

Pointing out that many of the songs appeared on the band's Caroline album, Trouser Press advised that the versions contained on A Reverse Willie Horton were superior, writing "with their echoey mixes and cardboard drums, they sound like they could’ve been appropriated from scratchy 45s found in a secluded Tennessee thrift shop."

== US LP – 1993 ==
Side A

1. Twenty-9
2. Type Cast
3. Water Main
4. History of Sex
5. Rachel
6. Chicken Walk
7. Big Headed Baby
8. Support A Man

Side B

1. Lovin Up A Storm
2. Comeback
3. '78 Style
4. You Gonna Change
5. White Tail
6. What To Do
7. 40 lb Block of Cheese
