= The Jon Spencer Blues Explosion =

American rock and roll band

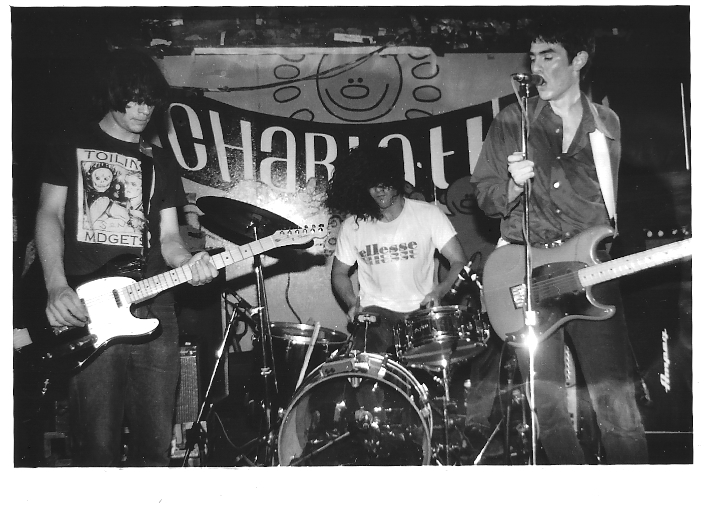
- The Blues Explosion performing in 1993. Left to right: Judah Bauer, Russell Simins, Jon Spencer

Background information
- Also known as: The Blues Explosion; JSBX
- Origin: New York City, U.S.
- Genres: Punk blues; blues rock; garage rock; alternative rock
- Years active: 1991–2016
- Labels: Matador; Shout! Factory; Shove!; In the Red; Mute; Sanctuary; JVC Victor; Toy's Factory; Ultrapop; Rock; Au Go Go; Everlasting; K; Rebel Beat Factory; Crypt; Clawfist; Hut; 1+2; Public Pop Can; Mom+Pop Music
- Past members: Jon Spencer; Judah Bauer; Russell Simins
- Website: jonspencerbluesexplosion.com

The Jon Spencer Blues Explosion was an American three-piece rock band from New York City, formed in 1991. The group consisted of Judah Bauer on guitar, backing vocals, harmonica and occasional lead vocals; Russell Simins on drums; and Jon Spencer on vocals, guitar and theremin. Their musical style is largely rooted in rock and roll; however, the band draws influences from punk, blues, garage, rockabilly, soul, noise rock, rhythm and blues and hip-hop.

The band released nine official studio albums, as well as collaborative records with Dub Narcotic Sound System and R.L. Burnside and numerous live, singles, out-take albums, compilations, remix albums. In 2010, the band released a series of expanded reissues. Throughout the course of their career, this experimental sound and occasionally unconventional recording techniques has allowed the band to work with such artists as Elliott Smith, Beck, Solomon Burke, Steve Albini, Martina Topley-Bird, and Mike D of the Beastie Boys.

== History ==
=== Formation ===
Originally from Hanover, New Hampshire, US, Jon Spencer attended Brown University in Providence, Rhode Island, where he was part of the noise rock band Shithaus, with Tod Ashley (Cop Shoot Cop, Firewater). Spencer moved to Washington, D.C., in 1985, where he formed the band Pussy Galore with Julia Cafritz; they relocated to New York in May 1986. Spencer played and recorded with Gibson Bros., Boss Hog and The Honeymoon Killers prior to the formation of the Blues Explosion.

Judah Bauer, from Appleton, Wisconsin, had been in an early line-up of The Spitters, and with Russell Simins, from Queens, New York, recorded as part of Crowbar Massage.

It was with Jerry Teel's Honeymoon Killers that Bauer, Simins and Spencer would all perform and record and from which they would go on to form The Jon Spencer Blues Explosion.

The sound of The Jon Spencer Blues Explosion was informed by previous bands with influence taken from working with the Gibson Bros. which was already evident in the last Pussy Galore album. "That final Pussy Galore album exuded a very Gibson Brothers-bent version of what was to come with Spencer's next, more successful venture the Jon Spencer Blues Explosion."

They were signed to the large independent label Matador Records between 1993 and 2002 in the US, Crypt Records between 1992 and 1994 in Germany and Mute Records between 1996 and 2005 in the UK although they have released material on a number of different labels including the 2010 reissues on Shout Factory in the US and Shove Records in the UK.

=== First albums (1991–1992) ===
The band had been playing together for six months when they had their first recording session with Kramer at Noise NY in July 1991 and recorded fourteen songs over the course of three hours, "only doing second takes here and there, we didn't even go to the mixing board". This session was issued in its entirety as a bootleg album, A Reverse Willie Horton at some point between late 1991 and early 1992 in an edition of 500 or 1000 copies (the figure varies between sources). It has been suggested that the source of the bootleg was a cassette that Jon Spencer let somebody copy during a tour with the Gibson Bros. in August 1991. The front cover image on the album is a negative of Clarence Thomas, his wife, and George Bush at Thomas' swearing in ceremony for the Supreme Court on October 19, 1991.The title refers to the convicted felon William R. Horton who featured prominently in political advertisements during the 1988 presidential campaign.

A second session was recorded by Steve Albini at the Waterfront, Hoboken, New Jersey, in November/December 1991. Tracks from both the Kramer and Albini sessions were then officially issued on the Caroline (US) / Hut (UK) release The Jon Spencer Blues Explosion; in larger amounts by Crypt Records as Crypt Style; and in an alternate version of Crypt Style by 1 + 2 Records (Japan), including the track "Colty" which was unavailable elsewhere until 2010. This was the only Blues Explosion album to be issued by Caroline Records, and the band's tenure there was short-lived and acrimonious.

The first single release was "Shirt Jac" on In The Red Records (1992) also from the second recording session with Steve Albini. The b-side is an arrangement of "Latch On," a song previously recorded in 1956 by both the Cochran Brothers and Ron Hargrave.

In late 1992 Jon Spencer Blues Explosion embarked on a long tour in the US supporting the Jesus Lizard. It has been said that during this time Jon Spencer's stage persona evolved into what is now synonymous with a Blues Explosion live performance.

=== Extra Width (1993–1994) ===
The band signed with Matador Records. Recording sessions for their second album, Extra Width, took place in Memphis at Doug Easley's studio on November 23/24 and December 3, 1992, during the Jesus Lizard tour and at Waterworks Recording in New York with Jim Waters where all further overdubs and mixing was done.

Extra Width was released in June 1993. "Afro" was later released as a 7" only single in the UK in 1994 and had a music video directed by Tom Surgal. This was the only single to be released from the album and featured b-side "Relax-Her" which is labelled as "Incidental" on the test pressing and introduced as such on the recording.

Their first TV appearance was on Channel 4 UK TV show The Word (Season 4, Episode 12) in February 1994, performing "Afro" and "History of Sex". Afterwards presenter Mark Lamarr said "they're the best live band I've ever seen."

Also in early 1994, In The Red Records released "Train No. 3" and "Train No. 1" as the third installment of the Explosion Juke Box Series ("Train No. 2" appeared on Extra Width).

Mo' Width was issued in July 1994 by Au Go Go Records and was composed of out-takes from the Extra Width-era, featuring covers of "There Stands The Glass" (Webb Pierce), "Beat of The Traps" (Teri Rodd & MSR Singers), and Ole Man Trouble (Otis Redding), an alternate mix of "Afro" with a much more prominent organ solo, and "Rob K" featuring Rob Kennedy from The Workdogs.

=== Orange (1994–1995) ===
Orange was recorded at Waterworks, NYC with Jim Waters and released in October 1994. "Bellbottoms", featuring a string arrangement by Kurt Hoffman. opens the album and was released as a single. Multiple music videos were released to promote the album.

In August 1994, The Jon Spencer Blues Explosion played a number of tour dates in Australia and New Zealand with Beck. In September 1994, they played in the Netherlands at Vera, Groningen on the 18th and recorded a live set for VPRO radio on the 25th. The VPRO session was issued as an unofficial 10" bootleg which included some previously unreleased songs.

In October 1994, the Blues Explosion made their first attempt to record a live album at DPC, Tucson, Arizona, but the performance was plagued with technical problems and was stopped when an audience member threw a stink bomb. Some of the songs were later released on the 2010 reissue of Controversial Negro. In December 1994, they performed live on The Jon Stewart Show at MTV Studios in New York City.

The Jon Spencer Blues Explosion played UK shows in March 1995 with the Beastie Boys, and in May they toured the US with The Roots and Beastie Boys.

The Experimental Remixes EP was released in May 1995 featuring various tracks from Orange reworked by artists including UNKLE, Beck, Mario Caldato Jr., Mike D, Dub Narcotic Sound System, Moby and GZA (featuring Killah Priest). By September 1996, Orange had sold 70,000 copies.

=== Now I Got Worry (1996–1997) ===
On February 6, 1996, the Jon Spencer Blues Explosion recorded the album A Ass Pocket of Whiskey with R.L. Burnside and Kenny Brown at Lunati Farms in Holly Springs, Mississippi. A further two tracks, "Alice Mae" and "Highway 7", also recorded at Lunati Farms in February 1996, would be released on the 1997 R.L. Burnside album Mr Wizard. The musical arrangements used on the tracks "2 Brothers" and "Tojo Told Hitler" from A Ass Pocket of Whiskey would evolve into The Jon Spencer Blues Explosion song "Cool Vee". which was released as a b-side to "2Kindsa Love". "Have You Ever Been Lonely?" is a jam based on "Vacuum of Loneliness" originally released on the 1992 self-titled album.

"It was pretty intimidating to go down [to Mississippi] and record with R.L. since he's such an idol of mine," says Spencer, who toured with the guitarist/singer in 1995. "You definitely get the feeling you're playing for him, rather than with him. It was pretty much the same with Rufus Thomas."

Now I Got Worry was produced by Jon Spencer and Jim Waters and recorded at Easley Studio, Memphis; G-Son, Los Angeles; and Waterworks West, Tucson. These sessions were mostly between February 5 and 13, 1996 (the same time as the recording with R.L. Burnside). The album was released by Matador Records and Mute Records in October 1996 (reaching number 50 in the UK album chart) and features appearances by Thermos Malling of Doo Rag (credited with "Bang" on "2Kindsa Love"), Rufus Thomas and Money Mark and a cover version of "Fuck Shit Up" originally by Dub Narcotic Sound System with Judah Bauer on lead vocals.

R.L. Burnside joined The Jon Spencer Blues Explosion for the Now I Got Worry tour dates in the UK, Europe, and the US in October and November 1996. On October 23, 1996, Lola da Musica, VPRO TV filmed both artists in a pre-show jam session at De Melkweg, Amsterdam and the footage was used for a music video, "Boogie Chillun". On October 29, the band recorded a short live set for MTV Studios in London, selections of which were used for a music video.

"2Kindsa Love" was released at a single in the UK by Mute Records and reached 122 on the UK charts. The second UK single, "Wail" was released by Mute Records on May 10, 1997, and reached number 66 on the UK singles chart. A music video for "Wail" was directed by Weird Al Yankovic.

In May 1997, Controversial Negro was released. This was a promotional only live album issued on vinyl in the US, CD in the UK and it was officially released in Japan on CD with five additional tracks. The title for this album comes from the Public Enemy song "Burn Hollywood Burn" from their 1990 album Fear of a Black Planet.

In June 1997, the band performed at the Tibetan Freedom Concert in New York City and a live version of "Blues X Man" was released on the accompanying triple CD album (which also featured Russell Simins performing with Cibo Matto).

=== Acme (1997–1999) ===
In March 1997 the band recorded a track at Dub Narcotic Studios, Olympia track for the K Records released the compilation Selector Dub Narcotic (released May 1998). The song titled "Blues Explosion Attack" name checked Calvin Johnson, Doo Rag, Subsonics, Speedball Baby, Demolition Doll Rods, R.L. Burnside, Dub Narcotic Sound System and Sleater Kinney who had supported the Blues Explosion at their Moore Theatre gig the previous day (The song would later be re-written and re-recorded for the album Acme).

Work on Acme began in October 1997, when the band entered the studio with Dan Nakamura, a.k.a. Dan the Automator for "Right Place, Wrong Time", a cover of the Dr. John hit used on the soundtrack to Scream 2. Spencer said: "The reason we did that Scream 2 soundtrack was to try working with a producer. We were definitely into the Dr. Octagon record – it's a great record, and also a bizarre kinda record. So besides 'Right Place.' we recorded some other songs.""

The next stop was Steve Albini's studio, Electrical Audio, where the Blues Explosion cut some tracks in the days following their 1998 New Year's Eve performance in Chicago. "...we cut everything live, like we always do," he says. "I wanted to use Steve because I knew he would do a good job and the tapes would sound great, and we could send them to anybody because we had a great starting point and couldn't really go wrong". In Chicago they also met Andre Williams who was playing locally. He recorded guest vocals for the track "Lapdance" (which wasn't released until the Acme Plus / Extra Acme albums issued the following year).

Regarding the production of the album, Spencer explained:

Some of Acme was done in the old-fashioned Blues Explosion way, me working with the engineer, but we were also casting a wide net. Some songs were mixed and remixed by different producers, which is one reason it got so expensive, and some of them were eventually stitched together from two or three different mixes. We weren't being so precious about these songs, we were letting other people work on it and then we'd shuffle the deck.

Acme was released in October 1998. In the US the first single to be released from the album was "Talk About The Blues". This song was recorded during a session with Calvin Johnson at Dub Narcotic, Olympia, Washington. (Most of the other tracks recorded at this time would be released in 1999 as the collaborative album Sideways Soul: Dub Narcotic Sound System Meets The Jon Spencer Blues Explosion in a Dancehall Style!.) The music video, directed by Evan Bernard, features Winona Ryder, Giovanni Ribisi and John C. Reilly as the Blues Explosion with Judah, Russell and Jon acting. "Talk About The Blues" reached number 120 in the UK singles chart.

The lyrics to "Talk About The Blues" were composed in reaction to a Rolling Stone review of Now I Got Worry and a Q&A with Jon Spencer and features the line "I do not play no blues, I play rock 'n' roll" (which itself was a reference to the Mississippi Fred McDowell album I Do Not Play No Rock 'n' Roll).

I wrote the song right after we did the interview, inspired by that and also some of the criticism we’ve received over the past couple years. If we tried to record some song that was a response to criticism as it happened, that would be too heavy-handed. The lyrics stayed true to the original off-the-cuff feel, what you call a rant. But it's not such a big deal, you know. A lot of that stuff just doesn't merit a response.

"Magical Colors" reached number 92 in the UK singles chart in November 1998. The Terry Richardson directed video is a compilation of still photographs. Non-Acme track "New Year (Destroyer)" was released as a split-single with Barry Adamson. "Heavy" was the final single to be released from Acme in August 1999: it reached number 106 in the UK singles chart.

In 1998, the Blues Explosion appeared on the Canal+ show Nulle Part Ailleurs performing "High Gear" and "Talk About The Blues". On the morning of July 22, 1999, The Jon Spencer Blues Explosion tour van was broken into at The Sheraton in Vancouver, British Columbia, Canada. Gear was stolen, including mics, amps, rack equipment, and an original 1962 Vanguard Model Theremin, which was never recovered.

=== Sideways Soul (1999–2001) ===
In September 1999 the band released the collaborative album Sideways Soul under the name Dub Narcotic Sound System Meets The Jon Spencer Blues Explosion in a Dancehall Style. The nine-track album was recorded at Dub Narcotic Studios, Olympia and featured a line-up of Jon Spencer on guitar, vocals and organ, Judah Bauer on guitar, Russell Simins on drums, Jeff Smith on organ and Calvin Johnson on vocals and melodica (Talk About The Blues was also recorded during these sessions).

The Acme outtakes and remixes were issued as Acme + (UK), Xtra Acme USA (US) and Extra Acme (CD) / Ura Acme (LP) / Extra Acme (Promo Only LP) (Japan), all of which had slightly different track listings. Like Acme the album features different production, mixing, remixing credits and guest appearances including Steve Albini, Nick Sansano, Jack Dangers, David Holmes, Tim Goldsworthy, Calvin Johnson, Moby, Andre Williams, Jill Cunniff, Cody Dickinson, Luther Dickinson and Jim Dickinson.

=== Plastic Fang (2002–2003) ===
The album Plastic Fang was produced by Steve Jordan and recorded at Oorong, the Magic Shop and The Hit Factory. Released in April 2002, it featured art and design by Chip Kidd with the limited CD and vinyl editions being issued in a 'Fang Pack'. Various editions of this album featured different track listings but there were guest appearances by Dr. John, Elliott Smith, Bernie Worrell, Willie Weeks and Bashiri Johnson.

"She Said" was the first single taken from the album, with a music video directed by Floria Sigismondi. On February 8, the group filmed a second live performance video at the 100 Club on Oxford Street, London for "She Said" (directed by Barney Clay). This single would be, to date, their highest UK single chart entry at number 58. In April, they appeared on the BBC TV show Later with Jools Holland featuring Jools playing piano during "Sweet n Sour". The single "Sweet N Sour" came out in July with a video directed by Stylewar and reached number 66 in the UK singles chart. Another single "Shakin' Rock'n'Roll Tonight" followed in November, reaching number 126.

On January 31, 2003, the band performed with Solomon Burke at Royal Festival Hall, London as "Solomon Burke Meets Jon Spencer Blues Explosion".

=== Damage (2004–2006) ===
Damage was the only album to be released on Sanctuary Records, and for this release the band were known as just the Blues Explosion. The shortened name lasted less than two years. The album was recorded between December 2003 and April 2004 at Empire View Studios, New York City. Globe Studios, NYC and Elegant Too Studios with production and mixing credits including Dan The Automator, DJ Shadow, Steve Jordan, Free Association (David Holmes), Jay Braun, Alan Moulder, Danny Madorsky, Chris Maxwell and Phil Hernandez (Elegant Too) as well as the Blues Explosion, Jon Spencer, and Russell Simins. During this time, the band also recorded the Guitar Wolf cover version "Kawasaki ZII750 Rock 'N' Roll" at Empire View Recording Studio with Danny Madorsky for the tribute album I Love Guitar Wolf...Very Much.

Damage was released in September 2004 and features appearances from artists including Chuck D ("Hot Gossip"), Martina Topley-Bird ("Spoiled" / "You Been My Baby"), James Chance and DJ Shadow ("Fed Up and Low Down"), and Simon Chardiet, who would later perform with the Heavy Trash live band ("Rattling"). The single "Burn It Off" was issued with a music video directed by Stylewar. It reached number 77 in the charts. In November, "Hot Gossip", the second single reached 119 in the official UK charts and had a music video directed by David Raccuglia. Issued as a red vinyl 7" only single featuring Elliott Smith on the B-side "Meet Me in the City" previously released on the tribute album Sunday Nights The Songs of Junior Kimbrough. "Crunchy" was the third and final single released in April 2005, reaching number 89 in the UK charts. The sleeves for all the Damage-era releases featured photography by Ashkan Sahihi and design by Chip Kidd. In Japan, there were two slightly different promotional Radio Session CDs featuring live recordings of the album tracks "Help These Blues", "Spoiled", "Rattling", "Hot Gossip" and a cover of the Suicide song "Rocket USA", which is unavailable elsewhere.

In September 28/29, Russell Simins and Judah Bauer joined Tom Waits and Larry Taylor for a performance on the David Letterman TV show, playing "Make It Rain" from the album Real Gone. Behind the scenes, the band participated in instigating a rumor that Tom Waits would be replacing Jon Spencer in the "Tom Waits Blues Explosion" in order to draw press attention to the performance. This almost led to the event being called off.

Between August 2004 and May 2005, the band toured Europe, the US, Japan (eight dates with The Kills), Australia, the UK (supporting The Hives) and Turkey. At this time in the UK, 'garage rock' and bands such as The Hives, The Strokes, and the White Stripes were popular and it was noted that The Jon Spencer Blues Explosion never got the same level of recognition.

It must rankle a little. Jon Spencer has been wrangling his brand of the blues – extrovert, down-and-dirty, pinched by punk and acknowledging a debt to Little Richard and Carl Perkins as much as Hasil Adkins and Son House – for around 14 years now. And have he and his band enjoyed even a taste of White Stripes-like acclaim?

Of "Crunchy", NME said it was "packing the kind of irresistible groove that would shoot straight to the number one for 14 years in any right-thinking world."

In 2005 an EP, Snack Cracker, was released in Japan. This compiled many of the UK single B-sides album with "Hot Gossip" and "Burn It Off" videos, a Jay Braun remix of "Hot Gossip" and a live recording of "Rattling" featuring Steve Jones of the Sex Pistols.

The Blues Explosion recorded the theme tune for Anthony Bourdain series No Reservations broadcast on The Travel Channel in 2005. The track lasts approximately 60 seconds; about 20 seconds of this is used during the program's intro sequence.

On September 21, 2005, The Jon Spencer Blues Explosion appeared at Ko Ko, London performing as part of the "Don't Look Back" shows organized by ATP. The band played the album Orange in its entirely, followed by a set of non-Orange songs.

Towards the end of 2005, the band went on hiatus. The members worked on numerous different projects with different artists.

=== Hiatus, Compilations, Reissues, and Limited Performances (2007–2011) ===
In October 2008, the band released a compilation of rare and unreleased tracks including all tracks from the Explosion Jukebox Series singles ("Shirt Jac", "Son of Sam", "Train No. 3", "Get with It" and "Ghetto Mom"). The album artwork parodied the original Back from the Grave 1983 compilation with drawings of Judah, Russell, and Jon replacing the original characters. Both sleeves were created by Mort Todd. The band also started playing live again in June 2008 with a secret show at Bowery Electric followed by New York City Bicycle Film Festival and a short Jukebox Explosion European tour during August and September 2008.

In 2009, it was announced that The Jon Spencer Blues Explosion would release a 22 track retrospective compilation Dirty Shirt Rock 'n' Roll: The First Ten Years followed by expanded reissues of the previous albums Extra Width, Orange, Acme, Now I Got Worry, Controversial Negro and tracks from the early releases (the original Kramer and Steve Albini recordings) Year One.

On April 16, 2010, they played a one-off show at Brooklyn Bowl and announced more shows taking place, including the Pitchfork Music Festival, Chicago, the Matador @ 21 Festival at The Pearl, Las Vegas and a number of US and Canadian shows.

The track "Bellbottoms" from the album Orange was featured at number 180 in a chart titled "The Top 200 Tracks of the 1990s" published by Pitchfork on August 30, 2010

In October, Yahoo! Music interviewed Jon Spencer, and the band performed acoustic versions of "Burn It Off", "Wail" and "Blues X Man". On October 15, 2010, videos of the songs and interview were published on the "Maximum Performance" blog along with a short article.

During 2010, the band started playing more regularly in Europe, US, and Australia. During the live shows, the band played some previously unreleased songs including a cover of "My War" by Black Flag. Whilst touring in Australia, they recorded a cover version of "Black Betty" at Linear Recording for a commercial created by Volkswagen of America's agency Deutsch L.A. Inc. broadcast during Super Bowl Sunday on American television (February 6, 2011).

=== Meat + Bone (2012) ===
The band was chosen by Jeff Mangum of Neutral Milk Hotel to perform at the All Tomorrow's Parties festival that he curated in March 2012 in Minehead, England.

They released their new album Meat + Bone in September. It was very well received by the likes of Pitchfork, Mojo, The Quietus, The Independent on Sunday and The Observer.

=== Freedom Tower and split (2015−2018) ===
After extensive touring to promote Meat+Bone, the band returned to the studio in early 2015 to start work on their next album. The album, titled Freedom Tower - No Wave Dance Party 2015 was released on March 24, 2015. The band toured in support of the record, playing their final show in Nuremberg on March 18, 2016.

In 2017 the Blues Explosion song "Confused" was included in the soundtrack for the film "War Machine", starring Brad Pitt.

In a 2018 interview, Spencer confirmed that the Blues Explosion had split permanently, offering as an explanation:

...everything got nipped in the bud when Judah [Bauer] got sick. He had developed a respiratory problem. He's doing better now, but he can't be going out on a rock and roll tour. Other things happened also. It wasn't just Judah's illness. For multiple reasons, it was, 'OK, this is probably over, this is done.'

== Other work / guest appearances ==
=== Judah Bauer ===
Judah Bauer was part of The Spitters "in their embryonic form" and has recorded or performed with Honeymoon Killers, Crowbar Massage, Twenty Miles aka: Bauer Brothers, Childballads (Stewart Lupton of Jonathan Fire*eater), Tom Waits, Speedball Baby and Cat Power and Dirty Delta Blues.

Under the name 20 Miles, Judah has released with his brother Donovan the following albums and EPs:

- Ragged Backyard Classics (In The Red, 1996)
- R.L. Boyce Othar Turner Fife & Drum Spam LP/CD (Fat Possum/Epitaph, 1997)
- Sinful Tunes & Spirituals (Au Go-Go, 1998; split EP with Doo Rag)
- I'm a Lucky Guy (Fat Possum/Epitaph, 1998)
- Let Every Town Furnish Its Own Women (Epitaph/Sony, 2000; split EP with Bob Log III)
- Keep It Coming (Fat Possum, 2002)
- Life Doesn't Rhyme (Fat Possum, 2003)

=== Russell Simins ===
Russell Simins has produced, remixed and performed with numerous bands including Yeah Yeah Yeahs, Honeymoon Killers, Crowbar Massage, Cibo Matto, Grapevine, Ween, Luscious Jackson, Yoko Ono, Money Mark, Fred Schneider, Duran Duran, Asian Dub Foundation, Stereolab, Tom Waits, The Pierces, Tandy, Spalding Rockwell, The Morning Pages, Little Barrie, Jena Malone, Tiny Masters of Today and Harper Simon. Russell Simins' song "I'm Not A Model" was also featured in the 2002 video game Jet Set Radio Future.

And as a core band member he has released the following albums:

- Honeymoon Killers – Hung Far Low LP/CD (Fist Puppet, 1991)
- Butter (Grand Royal, 1996)
- Crunt (Trance Syndicate, 1994)
- Russell Simins – Public Places LP/CD (Grand Royal, 2000)
- Men Without Pants (Victor, 2006)
- Men Without Pants – Naturally (Expansion Team (US)/Vicious Circle (FR), 2009)

=== Jon Spencer ===
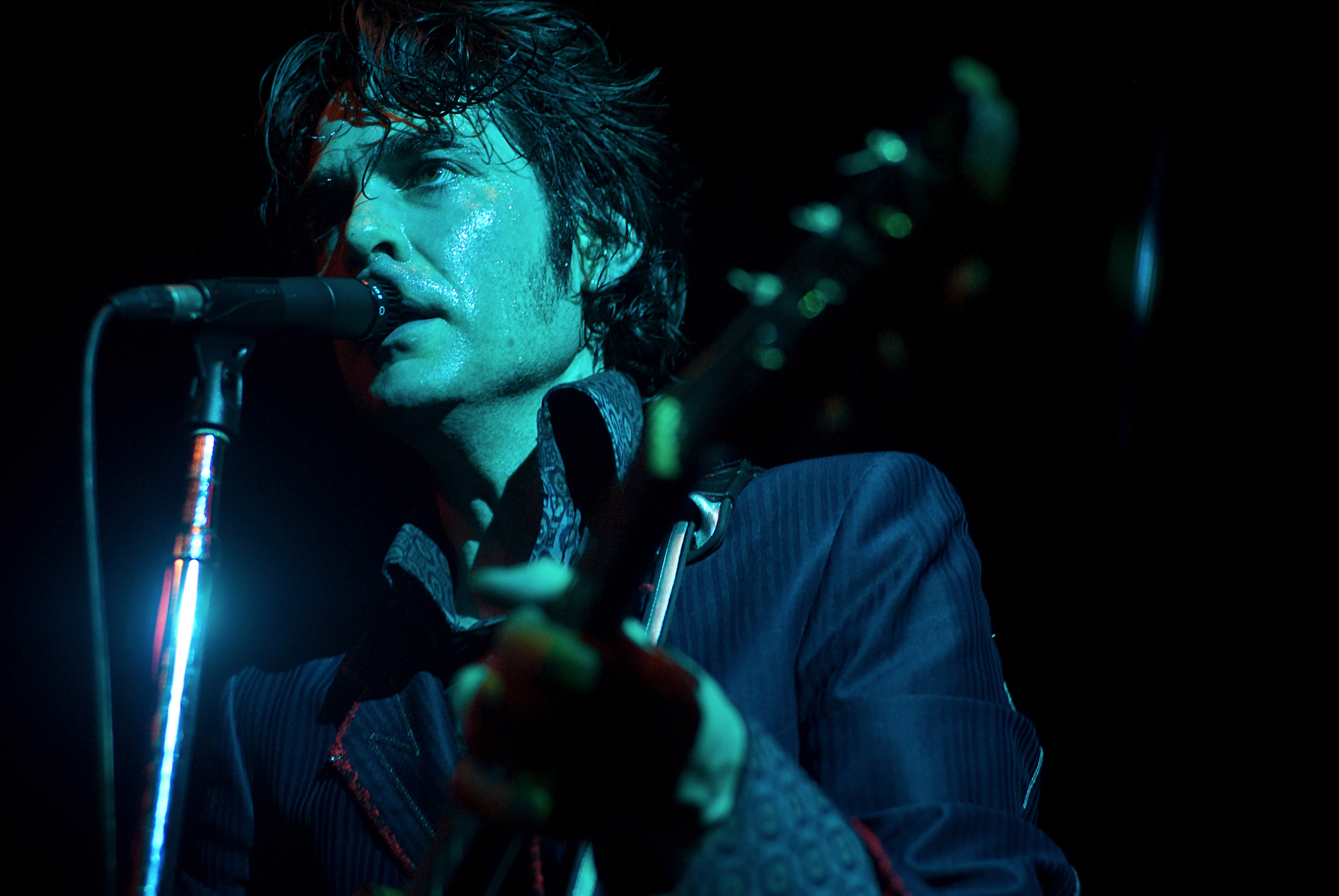
Jon Spencer in a Heavy Trash performance in São Paulo, Brazil, on April 23, 2009. Photo by Ariel Martini

Jon Spencer has released some solo material in addition to being a core member of Shithaus, Pussy Galore, Boss Hog, Spencer Dickinson, Solex vs Cristina Martinez + Jon Spencer and in Heavy Trash with Matt Verta-Ray released the following albums:

- Heavy Trash LP/CD (Yep Roc (US)/Crunchy Frog (DK)/Victor/JVC (JP), 2005)
- Heavy Trash – Going Way Out With Heavy Trash LP/CD (Yep Roc (US)/Crunchy Frog (DK)/Victor/JVC (JP), 2007)
- Heavy Trash – Mightnight Soul Serenade LP/CD (Big Legal Mess (US)/Crunchy Frog (DK)/Bronzerat (UK), 2009)

With the Honeymoon Killers he appears on several recordings and made one complete album as a member of the band with Russell Simins, Jerry Teel and Lisa Wells:

- Honeymoon Killers – Hung Far Low LP/CD (Fist Puppet, 1991)

He has also performed with, recorded, remixed and produced a huge number of artists including: Gibson Bros., Workdogs, Nancy Sinatra, Moby, Cheater Slicks, Beck, Demolition Doll Rods, Edison Rocket Train/Mike Edison, Einstürzende Neubauten, Coldcut, Powersolo, Puffy AmiYumi, Eros Ramazzotti, The Sadies, Add N to (X), Rob K, Haze XXL, Lost Crusaders, David Holmes, Khan, Los Straitjackets, Bomb the Bass, Princess Superstar, Speedball Baby, Five Dollar Priest, The King Brothers, The Tremolo Beer Gut, Bikini Machine, Phenomenal Handclap Band, The Micragirls, Cobra Killer, The Japanese Popstars, The Slew and Perrosky.

== Discography ==
=== Studio albums ===
Title	Year	Label	Format	Notes
A Reverse Willie Horton	1991	Public Pop Can	LP	US release; Kramer recordings
Crypt Style	1992	1+2	CD	Japanese release; Compilation of Kramer and Albini recordings; 25 tracks
Crypt Style	1992	Crypt	LP	German release; Compilation of Kramer and Albini recordings; 17 tracks
Crypt Style	1993	Crypt	CD	German release; Compilation of Kramer and Albini recordings; 18 tracks, includes "Eye To Eye"
The Jon Spencer Blues Explosion	1992	Caroline	CD / CAS	US release; Compilation of Kramer and Albini recordings; There was no vinyl release in the US
The Jon Spencer Blues Explosion	1992	Hut	CD / LP	UK release; Compilation of Kramer and Albini recordings
Year One	2010	Shout! Factory	CD	US reissue; Compilation of Kramer and Albini recordings; 38 tracks
Extra Width	1993	Crypt	LP / CD	German release
Extra Width	1993	Matador	LP / CD / CAS	US / UK release
Extra Width	1993	Au Go-Go	CD	Australian release
Extra Width	2000	Mute	2xLP / CD	Reissue with complete Mo' Width album
Extra Width	2010	Shout! Factory	2xCD	US expanded reissue; Includes complete Mo' Width album and additional disc of 24 rare and unreleased tracks
Orange	1994	Matador	LP / CD / CAS	US / UK release; First vinyl edition of the Matador release was a silver coloured picture disc
Orange	1994	Crypt	LP / CD	German release; First editions of the Crypt version of this album had orange rather than silver sleeves
Orange	1995	Toy's Factory	CD	Japanese edition; Includes bonus tracks "Beat of the Traps" and "Memphis Soul Typecast" from Mo' Width.
Orange	1995	Toy's Factory	CD	Japanese edition; Includes bonus tracks "Bellbottoms (Old Rascal Mix)" and "Flavor (Remix – Part 1 & 2)" from Experimental Remixes.
Orange	2000	Mute	LP / CD	Reissue, CD is enhanced with videos of "Dang", "Flavor" and "Bellbottoms"
Orange + Experimental Remixes	2010	Shout! Factory	2xCD	Reissue includes Experimental Remixes and bonus tracks; "Haircut", "Woman Love" (VPRO), "Very Rare" (VPRO), "Shakin'" (S60 V JSBX), an alternate recording of "Bellbottoms" and recordings of "Brenda", "BX Man", "78 Style" and "Greyhound" live at CBGB.
Now I Got Worry	1996	Toy's Factory	CD	Japanese edition; Includes bonus tracks "Cool Vee" and "Get With It"
Now I Got Worry	1996	Mute	CD / LP	UK release
Now I Got Worry	1996	Matador	CD / LP / CAS	US release
Now I Got Worry	1996	Au Go-Go	CD	Australian release
Now I Got Worry	1996	Rock Records & Tapes	CD	Korean edition; Omits "Fuck Shit Up".
Now I Got Worry	2010	Shout! Factory	CD	US expanded reissue; Includes an additional 11 rare tracks, 4 Radio Spots and a previously unreleased song titled "Roosevelt Hotel Blues".
Now I Got Worry	2010	Shove!	CD	UK expanded reissue; Includes an additional 11 rare tracks, 4 Radio Spots and a previously unreleased song titled "Roosevelt Hotel Blues".
Acme	1998	Toy's Factory	CD	Japanese edition; Includes "Hell" and ends with the full version of "Calvin" rather than "Calvin (Reprise)"
Acme	1998	Labels	CD	French edition
Acme	1998	Everlasting Records	CD	Spanish edition
Acme	1998	Mute	LP / CD	UK release
Acme	1998	Matador	LP / CD	US release
Acme	1998	Rock Records	CAS	Thai release
Acme + Acme Plus	2010	Shout! Factory	2xCD	Reissue includes bonus tracks
Sideways Soul: Dub Narcotic Sound System Meets The Jon Spencer Blues Explosion In A Dancehall Style	1999	K Records	LP / CD	US release
Sideways Soul: Dub Narcotic Sound System Meets The Jon Spencer Blues Explosion In A Dancehall Style	1999	Au Go-Go	CD	Australian release
Sideways Soul: Dub Narcotic Sound System Meets The Jon Spencer Blues Explosion In A Dancehall Style	1999	Rebel Beat Factory	CD	Japanese release
Plastic Fang	2002	Mute	CD / Ltd. CD / 2xLP	UK release; Ltd CD and vinyl in "Fang Pack".; Vinyl edition features "Point of View", "Like A Bat", "Then Again I Will" and "Do Ya Wanna Get It?" which were not on UK CD editions.
Plastic Fang	2002	Matador	CD / Ltd. CD / 2xLP	US release; Ltd CD and vinyl in "Fang Pack".; CD track list replaces "Tore Up & Broke" with "Point Of View" (in comparison to the UK CD edition).; Vinyl edition features "Tore Up & Broke", "Like A Bat", "Then Again I Will" and "Do Ya Wanna Get It?" which were not on US CD editions.
Plastic Fang	2002	Toy's Factory	CD	Japanese release; Features "Ghetto Mom", "Alex", "Then Again I Will" and "Like A Bat" which are not on the UK version but omits "Tore Up & Broke" and "Mother Nature".
Plastic Fang	2002	Mute / Virgin	2xCD	Australian release; Double CD set with B-sides and remixes.
Plastic Fang	2002	Ultrapop	CD	Argentinian release; In comparison to the UK CD release this edition of the album omits "Tore Up & Broke" which is replaced with "Point of View" and includes a thirteenth bonus track "Do Ya Wanna Get It?"
Plastic Fang	2002	Everlasting	CD	Spanish release
Damage	2004	Mute	Ltd CD/DVD / CD / LP	UK release; CD/DVD edition in Matchbook sleeve features 22 minute film directed by Niko Tavernese.
Damage	2004	Sanctuary Records	Ltd CD / CD	US release; Ltd CD edition in Matchbook sleeve with enhanced section including 22 minute film directed by Niko Tavernese.
Damage	2004	Victor / JVC	CD	Japanese release; Includes "Grinding", "The Funky Gremlin" and enhanced section with 22 minute film directed by Niko Tavernese.
Damage	2004	Modular Records	CD	Australian release
Damage	2004	Ultrapop	CD	Argentinian release
Meat + Bone	2012	Bronze Rat	CD / LP	UK release
Meat + Bone	2012	Mom + Pop Music	–	US release
Freedom Tower - No Wave Dance Party 2015	2015	Bronze Rat	CD / LP	UK release
Freedom Tower - No Wave Dance Party 2015	2015	Mom + Pop Music	-	US release

=== Other albums and EPs ===
Title	Year	Label	Format	Notes
Mo' Width	1994	Au Go-Go	LP / CD	11 recordings from Extra Width-era; Features alternate recording of "Afro" and covers of "There Stands The Glass" (Webb Pierce), "Beat of The Traps" (Teri Rodd & MSR Singers) and "Ole Man Trouble" (Otis Redding).; Only released as a stand-alone album in Australia, this has since been issued on the Mute (2000) and Shout! Factory (2010) reissues of Extra Width.
Experimental Remixes	1995	Matador	12" / CD	Orange remix album; 12" only included three tracks; CD features the unlisted "Tour Diary" in addition to the six remixes by UNKLE, Mike D, Beck, Moby, Dub Narcotic Sound System, GZA and Killah Priest.
Experimental Remixes	2000	Mute	2xLP / CD	Reissue of the Orange remix album; Includes additional remixes by Prince Paul, Plunderphonic (John Oswald) and F. Carles (MC Relov/Hypercard)
Controversial Negro	1997	Mute	CD	Promo only live album; 14 tracks
Controversial Negro	1997	Matador	LP	Promo only live album; 14 tracks
Controversial Negro	1997	Toy's Factory	Ltd CD / CD	Original official Japanese release; Issued in Ltd album-style card sleeve and plastic case; 19 tracks
Controversial Negro	2010	Shout! Factory	CD	Expanded reissue; 29 tracks; Adds "Bellbottoms" to original "Hotel Congress" show and nine tracks recorded live in 1994
Rocketship	1997	AU Go-Go	7" / CD	Single / EP; Australia-only release; 7" includes "Chocolate Joe" B-side / CD includes four live tracks from the Japanese release of Controversial Negro.
Acme Plus	1999	Mute	2xLP / CD	UK release; Acme-era out-takes, B-sides and remixes.
Xtra Acme USA	1999	Matador	2xLP / CD	US release; Acme-era out-takes, B-sides and remixes.
Ura-Acme	1999	Toy's Factory	LP	Japanese release; Vinyl-only; Acme-era out-takes, B-sides and remixes.; The only variation of Acme out-takes album to feature "New Year (Destroyer)"
Extra-Acme	1999	Toy's Factory	CD / LP	Japanese release; CD and Vinyl editions had slightly different track-listings and running orders.; Vinyl version was only issued as a promo.; Acme-era out-takes, B-sides and remixes.; Another variation on the track-list and running order
Fang Plastique	2002	Toy's Factory	CD	Japanese only EP; Features UK b-sides and two different "She Said" videos.
Fang Visual	2002	Matador	DVD	Full length DVD with live tracks, videos and interview footage; Given away free via Matador Records or shrink-wrapped with US CD copies of Plastic Fang.
Snack Cracker	2005	JVC / Victor	CD	Japanese only EP; Includes remixes, b-sides videos and "Rattling (Live on Jonsey's Jukebox)" which is exclusive to this release.
Jukebox Explosion Rockin' Mid-90s Punkers	2007	In The Red	LP / CD	Compilation of Jukebox Series 7" singles and previously unreleased songs.
Dirty Shirt Rock 'n' Roll: The First Ten Years	2010	Shout! Factory	CD	US release; 22 track retrospective album.
Dirty Shirt Rock 'n' Roll: The First Ten Years	2010	Shove!	CD	UK release; 22 track retrospective album.
That's It Baby Right Now We Got To Do It Let's Dance!	2016	Shove / Bronze Rat / Mom + Pop Music	LP	Live In Tokyo Summer Sonic August 15, 2015; Record Store Day release; Pink vinyl LP; Limited to 3000 or 4000 copies

=== Singles ===
Year	Title	Label	Album	Notes
1992	"Shirt Jac"	In The Red	Jukebox Explosion Rockin' Mid-90s Punkers / Year One	B-side: "Latch On"
1992	"Son of Sam "	In The Red	Jukebox Explosion Rockin' Mid-90s Punkers / Extra Width (2010)	B-side: "Bent"
1992	"History of Sex"	Clawfist	Year One	B-sides: "Write A Song" / "Smoke Cigarettes"
1993	"Afro"	Matador Records	Extra Width	B-side: "Relax-Her"
1993	"Train # 3"	In The Red	Jukebox Explosion Rockin' Mid-90s Punkers / Extra Width (2010)	B-side: "Train No. 1"
1995	"Bellbottoms"	Matador Records	Orange	B-side: "Miss Elaine"; Issued as a white vinyl 7" single
1996	"Get With It"	In The Red	Jukebox Explosion Rockin' Mid-90s Punkers / Now I Got Worry (2010)	B-side: "Down Low"
1996	"2Kindsa Love"	Mute	Now I Got Worry	UK Chart Position: No. 122; B-sides: "Fish Sauce" / "Cool Vee" / "Let's Smurf"; Issued on pink vinyl 7" and CD.
1997	"Wail"	Mute	Now I Got Worry	UK Chart Position: No. 66; Non-album tracks issued across formats: Wail (Video Mix) / Yellow Eyes / Buscemi / Turn Up Greene / Wail (Mario Mix) / Flavor (Live Version) / Judah Love Theme / Radio Spot.; Released on grey and green vinyl 7" singles and CD.
1997	"Rocketship"	Au Go-Go Records	Now I Got Worry	B-sides: "Chocolate Joe" / "Down Low" (Live) / "Dynamite Lover" (Live) / "Flavor" (Live) / "Full Grown" (Live); Australia-only single issued on CD and 7".
1998	"Magical Colors"	Mute	Acme	UK Chart Position: No. 92; B-sides: "Confused" / "Bacon" / "Get Down Lover"; Issued on red vinyl 7" and CD.
1998	"Talk About The Blues"	Mute / Matador	Acme	UK Chart Position: No. 120; UK B-sides: "Wait A Minute" / "Lovin' Machine (Automator)" / "Calvin (Zebra Ranch)" / "T.A.T.B. (For The Saints And Sinners Remix)" / "Talk About The Blues" (Video); US B-Sides: "Bacon" / "Get Down Lover" / "Lovin' Machine (Automator Mix)" / "Calvin" / "Calvin (Zebra Ranch Mix)"; Issued on orange vinyl 7", CD and 12".
1999	"Calvin"	Au Go-Go Records	Acme	B-sides: "Wait A Minute" / "Confused" / "Get Down Lover" / "Calvin (Zebra Ranch)" / "T.A.T.B. (For The Saints and the Sinners Remix)"; Australia-only single issued on 12" and CD.
1999	"New Year (Destroyer)"	Slut Smalls	Ura-Acme (Japan-only vinyl album)	A-side: Barry Adamson – "The Crime Scene"; Issued as 7"-only split single with Barry Adamson.
1999	"Heavy (Remix)"	Mute	Acme	UK Chart Position: No. 106; B-sides: Give Ya Some Hell / 2 Kindsa Love (Duck Rock 105.9 FM Remix) Blues Power / Do You Wanna Get Heavy? (Duck Rock Hip 'n' Bass Remix) / Attack (Detroit) / 2 Kindsa Love (Duck Rock 105.9 FM Final Mix) / Do You Wanna Get Heavy? (Duck Rock Hip 'n' Bass Final Mix); Issued on blue vinyl 7", CD and 12".
2000	"Lap Dance (Jim Waters/Scott Benzel Remix)"	In the Red	–	B-Side: Lap Dance (Jim Thirlwell Remix); features Andre Williams; 12"-only single; original version of Lap Dance released on Acme Plus / Xtra Acme USA
2000	"Techno Animal Remixes"	Mute	–	Track listing: "Bacon (Radio Edit)" / "Not Yet (Sci-Mix)" / "Bacon (Dub)" / "Not Yet (Splatter Mix)"; 12"-only single; Remixes of tracks released on Acme Plus / Xtra Acme USA
2002	"Ghetto Mom"	In the Red	Jukebox Explosion Rockin' Mid-90s Punkers	B-Side: "Do Ya Wanna Get It"
2002	"She Said"	Mute	Plastic Fang	UK Chart Position No. 58; B-Sides: "Ghetto Mom" / "Point of View" / "Do Ya Wanna Get It?" / "Then Again I Will" / "Like A Bat"; Released on 7" and two-different CD singles
2002	"Sweet 'n' Sour"	Mute	Plastic Fang	UK Chart Position No. 66; B-Sides: "Shakin' Rock 'N' Roll Tonight" (Live at VPRO) / "Maureen" / "Alex" / "Sweet N Sour" (Video) / "Plastic Fang Bite Size – Album Excerpts (Mean Heart/She Said/Shakin' Rock 'N' Roll Tonight/Hold On)"; Released on 7" and two different CD singles.
2002	"Shakin' Rock 'n' Roll Tonight"	Mute	Plastic Fang	UK Chart Position No. 126; B-Sides: "She Said (The Tremolo Beer Gut Mix)" / "Over and Over (Techno Animal Mix)" / "Money Rock 'N' Roll (Sub Species Mix)" / "Over and Over (Barry Adamson Mix)" / "She Said" (Video – Floria Sigismondi) "She Said" (Video – Live) / "Point of View" (Video – Live) / "Shakin' Rock 'N' Roll Tonight" (Video – Live); Released on 7" and CD.
2004	"Burn It Off"	Mute	Damage	UK Chart Position No. 77; B-Sides: "Fed Up and Low Down" (Edit) / "Serial Number" / "Fed Up And Low Down" (Edit) / "Cold Cold Eyes" (Demo Version); Released on clear vinyl 7" and CD.
2004	"Hot Gossip"	Mute	Damage	UK Chart Position No. 119; B-Sides: "Meet Me In The City"; Released as a red vinyl 7" only single.; Hot Gossip features Chuck D and "Meet Me In The City" is a Junior Kimbrough cover version featuring Elliott Smith on acoustic guitar.
2005	"Crunchy"	Mute	Damage	UK Chart Position No. 89; B-Sides: "Crunchy (Solex 'Bounce' Remix)" / "Hot Gossip (TMJ (!!!) Remix)" / "Mars Arizona (DFA Remix)" / "Blues Explosion Man" (Live at FMU); Released on 7", 12" and CD.
2011	"No Reservations" / "Black Betty"	Self Released	–	self-released 7"
2011	"Black Betty"	Amphetamine Reptile	–	Split single with Melvins; 600 copies on splatter vinyl; 200 on tri-color vinyl (100 of these had a two-color, linocut, hand printed sleeve There are 10 copies of each art show design)
2012	"Gadzooks!" / "Tell Me That You Love Me"	In The Red Records	–	7"; "Tell Me That You Love me" is a cover of James Brown & His Famous Flames
2012	"Bag of Bones" / "Black Mold"	Mom + Pop Music	Meat+Bone	7"
2014	"She's On It – Jack The Ripper" / "Audio Vacation"	Mom + Pop Music / Bronze Rat	n/a	12" single; Record Store Day release
2015	"Human Obscene" / "Shake That Bat"	In The Red Records	n/a	7" single
2015	"Don't Wanna Live Like The Dead"	Sony Music Labels Inc.	n/a	CD single; includes three versions of the title track; released under the name 'Jack Crispin'; from the feature film Grasshopper

== Music videos ==
Year	Title	Director(s)	Album	Notes
1992	"Rachel"	Jim Spring and Jens Jurgensen	Jon Spencer Blues Explosion / Crypt Style	Released on Live Promo Video
1993	"Afro"	Tom Surgal	Extra Width	
1994	"Dang"	Steve Hanft	Orange	
1994	"Flavor"	Evan Bernard	Orange	Features Mike D of the Beastie Boys and Beck
1995	"Bellbottoms"	Tom Surgal	Orange	
1996	"2Kindsa Love"	Mike Mills	Now I Got Worry	
1997	"Wail"	Weird Al Yankovic	Now I Got Worry	
1998	"Magical Colors"	Terry Richardson	Acme	A series of still photographs
1998	"Talk About the Blues"	Evan Bernard	Acme	Stars Giovanni Ribisi as Judah Bauer, John C. Reilly as Russell Simins and Winona Ryder as Jon Spencer.
1998	"Attack"		Acme	With Alec Empire, video released on Digital Hardcore compilations
2002	"She Said"	Floria Sigismondi	Plastic Fang	
2002	"She Said (100 Club)"	Barney Clay	Plastic Fang	
2002	"Sweet 'n' Sour"	Stylewar	Plastic Fang	
2004	"Burn It Off"	Stylewar	Damage	
2004	"Hot Gossip"	David Raccuglia	Damage	Features Chuck D of Public Enemy
2012	"Black Mold"	Toon Aerts	Meat + Bone	
2012	"Bag of Bones"	Lucy Dyson and Joseph Jensen	Meat + Bone	
2015	"Betty Vs. the NYPD"	Michael Lavine	Freedom Tower - No Wave Dance Party 2015	Starring Bridget Everett
2015	"Tales of the Old New York: The Rock Box"	Brook Linder	Freedom Tower - No Wave Dance Party 2015	
