= Meat + Bone =

Meat + Bones

Studio album by the Jon Spencer Blues Explosion
- Released: September 18, 2012
- Recorded: October 2011
- Genre: Punk blues, alternative rock
- Label: Bronze Rat Records

The Jon Spencer Blues Explosion chronology
| Damage (2004) | Meat + Bones (2012) | Freedom Tower (2015) |

Meat + Bone is the ninth studio album by American punk blues band the Jon Spencer Blues Explosion, released on September 18, 2012. Their previous album Damage came out in 2004.

== Reception ==
Professional ratings
Aggregate scores
| Source | Rating |
|---|---|
| Metacritic | 75/100 |
Review scores
| Source | Rating |
| AllMusic | 3.5/5 stars |
| BBC | positive |
| Blurt | 9/10 |
| Drowned in Sound | 6/10 |
| NME | 8/10 |
| Pitchfork | 7.3/10 |
| Sputnikmusic | 4/5 |

Meat + Bone received generally positive reviews from critics. At Metacritic, which assigns a rating out of 100 to reviews from mainstream critics, the album received an average score of 75 based on 22 reviews, which indicates "generally favorable reviews".

== Track listing ==
1. Black Mold
2. Bag of Bones
3. Boot Cut
4. Get Your Pants Off
5. Ice Cream Killer
6. Strange Baby
7. Bottle Baby
8. Danger
9. Black Thoughts
10. Unclear
11. Bear Trap
12. Zimgar
