= Freedom Tower - No Wave Dance Party 2015 =

Studio album by the Jon Spencer Blues Explosion
- Released: March 24, 2015
- Genre: Punk blues, alternative rock
- Label: Mom + Pop Music

The Jon Spencer Blues Explosion chronology
Meat + Bone (2012)	Freedom Tower - No Wave Dance Party 2015 (2015)

Professional ratings
Review scores
Source	Rating
AllMusic	4/5 stars
Pitchfork	7/10
Record Collector	3/5 stars

Freedom Tower - No Wave Dance Party 2015 is the tenth and final studio album by American punk blues band the Jon Spencer Blues Explosion, released in 2015.

== Track listing ==
1. "Funeral" – 2:34
2. "Wax Dummy" – 3:09
3. "Do the Get Down" – 2:49
4. "Betty Vs the NYPD" – 1:52
5. "White Jesus" – 1:39
6. "Born Bad" – 2:44
7. "Down and Out" – 2:37
8. "Crossroad Hop" – 4:01
9. "The Ballad of Joe Buck" – 1:42
10. "Dial Up Doll" – 2:52
11. "Bellevue Baby" – 3:32
12. "Tales of Old New York: The Rock Box" – 2:12
13. "Cooking for Television" – 2:43
