= Crypt Style =

Compilation album by the Jon Spencer Blues Explosion
- Released: May 24, 1993
- Recorded: July, Nov./Dec. 1991
- Genre: Punk blues, alternative rock
- Label: Crypt Records
- Producer: Jon Spencer

The Jon Spencer Blues Explosion chronology
The Jon Spencer Blues Explosion (1992)	Crypt Style (1993)	Extra Width (1993)

Professional ratings
Review scores
Source	Rating
AllMusic	4/5 stars

Crypt Style is the second official album by the group the Jon Spencer Blues Explosion, and was first released in 1992 on CD in Japan on the "1+2" label. It was later released with an abbreviated track listing on CD in Germany, and as an LP in the US, both in 1993 under the Crypt label. The album tracks were recorded in two different sessions. The first come from a recording session with Kramer in July 1991, and followed by a recording session with Steve Albini in November and December 1991.

Many of the tracks that appear on this album are the same ones that appear on both A Reverse Willie Horton Bootleg LP and The Jon Spencer Blues Explosion CD that was released in the US in 1992. Because there are three versions of this album with different track listings, many people consider this release to be the same as the self-titled release, because all of the tracks are from the same two recording sessions.

== Track listings ==
=== Japan CD - 1992 ===
1. Lovin' Up a Storm
2. Support-A-Man
3. White Tail
4. '78 Style
5. Chicken Walk
6. Mo' Chicken/Let's Get Funky
7. Water Main
8. Like A Hawk
9. Big Headed Baby
10. The Feeling Of Love
11. Kill-A-Man
12. Rachel
13. History of Sex
14. Comeback
15. Twentynine
16. What To Do
17. 40 lb Block Of Cheese
18. Write a Song
19. I.E.V.
20. Eye To Eye
21. Eliza Jane
22. Maynard Ave.
23. Colty
24. Intro A
25. Biological

=== Germany CD - 1993 ===
1. Lovin' Up a Storm - 1:45
2. Support a Man - 2:01
3. White Tail - 2:28
4. Maynard Ave. - 1:55
5. '78 Style - 1:27
6. Chicken Walk - 2:53
7. Mo' Chicken Let's Get Funky - 2:42
8. Watermain - 1:15
9. Like a Hawk - 2:27
10. Big Headed Baby - 1:06
11. Write a Song - 1:58
12. Eye to Eye - 1:38
13. The Feeling of Love - 1:52 (Different take than on Self-Titled album)
14. Kill a Man - 1:52
15. Rachel - 2:25
16. History of Sex - 1:47
17. Comeback - 3:10
18. The Vacuum of Loneliness - 3:02

=== US LP - 1993 ===
Side A

1. Lovin' Up a Storm
2. Support-A-Man
3. White Tail
4. '78 Style
5. Chicken Walk
6. Mo' Chicken/Let's Get Funky
7. Water Main
8. Like A Hawk
9. Big Headed Baby

Side B

1. The Feeling of Love
2. Kill-A-Man
3. Rachel
4. History of Sex
5. Comeback
6. Twentynine
7. What To Do
8. 40 lb Block of Cheese
