= Now I Got Worry =

1996 album by the Jon Spencer Blues Explosion

Studio album by the Jon Spencer Blues Explosion
- Released: October 15, 1996
- Genre: Punk blues, alternative rock
- Length: 45:15
- Label: Matador
- Producer: Jon Spencer, Jim Waters

The Jon Spencer Blues Explosion chronology
A Ass Pocket of Whiskey (1996)	Now I Got Worry (1996)	Controversial Negro (1997)

Singles from Now I Got Worry
- 1. "2Kindsa Love" Released: 1996; 2. "Wail" Released: 1997; 3. "Rocketship" Released: 1997

Now I Got Worry is the fifth studio album by the Jon Spencer Blues Explosion. It was released via Matador Records on October 15, 1996. "Fuck Shit Up" is a cover of a Dub Narcotic song. "Weird Al" Yankovic directed the music video for "Wail".

== Critical reception ==
Professional ratings
Review scores
Source	Rating
AllMusic	4/5 stars
Alternative Press	5/5
Chicago Tribune	3/4 stars
Entertainment Weekly	C+
Mojo	4/5 stars
NME	5/10
The Philadelphia Inquirer	3.5/4 stars
Pitchfork	8.5/10
Rolling Stone	4/5 stars
Spin	7/10

Mark Deming of AllMusic gave the album 4 stars out of 5, saying, "Now I Got Worry may not be JSBX's best album, but it does capture their taut, blazing, live sound and their eccentric studio approach with a better balance than anything else in their catalog; if you want to get slapped upside the head while you boogie all night long, this is the album for you."

The album was included in the book 1001 Albums You Must Hear Before You Die.

== Track listing ==
No.	Title	Writer(s)	Length
1.	"Skunk"	Spencer, Explosion	2:39
2.	"Identify"	Spencer, Explosion	1:08
3.	"Wail"	Spencer, Explosion	3:09
4.	"Fuck Shit Up"	Dub Narcotic	3:08
5.	"2Kindsa Love"	Spencer, Explosion	3:02
6.	"Love All of Me"	Spencer, Explosion	1:58
7.	"Chicken Dog"	Explosion, Thomas	3:01
8.	"Rocketship"	Spencer, Explosion	3:14
9.	"Dynamite Lover"	Spencer, Explosion	2:58
10.	"Hot Shot"	Spencer, Explosion	2:09
11.	"Can't Stop"	Explosion, Mark Ramos Nishita	2:53
12.	"Firefly Child"	Spencer, Explosion	3:24
13.	"Eyeballin"	Spencer, Explosion	3:17
14.	"R.L. Got Soul"	Spencer, Explosion	4:05
15.	"Get Over Here"	Spencer, Explosion	2:09
16.	"Sticky"	Spencer, Explosion	2:54

2010 reissue edition bonus tracks
No.	Title	Length
17.	"Cool Vee"	4:10
18.	"Fish Sauce"	3:28
19.	"Yellow Eyes"	3:57
20.	"Turn Up Greene"	2:52
21.	"Buscemi"	1:42
22.	"Get with It"	1:34
23.	"Let's Smerf"	2:12
24.	"Down Low"	2:02
25.	"Chocolate Joe"	2:32
26.	"Judah Love Theme"	1:26
27.	"Dig My Shit"	1:38
28.	"Roosevelt Hotel Blues"	3:23
29.	"Radio Ad - Announcer #1"	1:09
30.	"Radio Ad - Ernie Eddie"	0:31
31.	"Radio Ad - Announcer #2"	0:50
32.	"Radio Ad - Street Sez-Me"	0:40

== Personnel ==
Credits adapted from liner notes.

Blues Explosion

- Judah Bauer – guitar, vocals
- Russell Simins – drums
- Jon Spencer – vocals, guitar

Guests

- Mark Ramos Nishita – clavinet (on "Chicken Dog"), piano (on "Can't Stop"), organ (on "Firefly Child")
- Rufus Thomas – vocals (on "Chicken Dog")
- Justin Berry – saxophone (on "Firefly Child")
- Thermos Malling – bang (on "2Kindsa Love" and "Sticky")

== Charts ==
Chart (1996)	Peak position
Dutch Albums (Album Top 100)	80
Scottish Albums (OCC)	59
Swedish Albums (Sverigetopplistan)	25
UK Albums (OCC)	50
US Billboard 200	121
US Heatseekers Albums (Billboard)	4
