= Orange (The Jon Spencer Blues Explosion album) =

1994 studio album by the Jon Spencer Blues Explosion

Studio album by the Jon Spencer Blues Explosion
- Released: October 11, 1994
- Recorded: 1993–1994
- Studios: Water Works (New York, NY)
- Genres: Punk blues; garage rock; experimental funk
- Length: 44:44
- Label: Matador
- Producers: Jon Spencer; Jim Waters

The Jon Spencer Blues Explosion chronology
Extra Width (1993)	Orange (1994)	A Ass Pocket of Whiskey (1996)

Singles from Orange
- 1. "Bellbottoms" Released: February 14, 1995

Orange is the fourth studio album by the Jon Spencer Blues Explosion. It was released through Matador Records on October 11, 1994. The Village Voice ranked the album #16 of the top albums of 1994. NME named it the 16th best album of 1994. In 2018, Paste named it the 48th best garage rock album of all time. The single "Bellbottoms" was included in The Pitchfork 500.

== Critical reception ==
Professional ratings
Review scores
Source	Rating
AllMusic	4/5 stars
Entertainment Weekly	B
The List	5/5 stars
Mojo	4/5 stars
Pitchfork	8.6/10
Record Collector	4/5 stars
The Rolling Stone Album Guide	3.5/5 stars
Select	4/5
Spin Alternative Record Guide	8/10
The Village Voice	B−

Michele Romero of Entertainment Weekly gave the album a grade of B, saying, "The resulting cross between rock & roll and insanity can be thrilling in its fervency; it can also be as boring as a band warming up before the show." Tom Breihan of Pitchfork gave the album an 8.6 out of 10, calling it "an absurd burst of swagger and libido, as rendered by three total expert musicians." Thom Jurek of AllMusic gave the album 4 stars out of 5, saying, "Orange is almost entirely new sonic terrain -- but it keeps the trio's trademark sweaty, musical terrorism and hedonistic rage up front."

== In popular culture ==
'"Bellbottoms" is featured in the opening of the 2017 film Baby Driver directed by Edgar Wright and appeared on its soundtrack.

== Track listing ==
All tracks are written by Judah Bauer, Russell Simins, and Jon Spencer.

No.	Title	Length
1.	"Bellbottoms"	5:19
2.	"Ditch"	2:35
3.	"Dang"	1:56
4.	"Very Rare"	3:06
5.	"Sweat"	3:05
6.	"Cowboy"	2:59
7.	"Orange"	3:00
8.	"Brenda"	2:58
9.	"Dissect"	2:41
10.	"Blues X Man"	3:35
11.	"Full Grown"	3:21
12.	"Flavor"	6:19
13.	"Greyhound"	4:07

2010 reissue edition bonus tracks
No.	Title	Length
14.	"Showgirl"	4:09
15.	"Miss Elaine"	2:57
16.	"Haircut"	2:20
17.	"Bellbottoms (Original Long Ending)"	2:33
18.	"Brenda / BX Man / 78 Style / Greyhound (Live at CBGB)"	10:48
19.	"Frustrate (VPRO)"	4:36
20.	"Very Rare (VPRO)"	5:49

2010 reissue edition bonus disc
No.	Title	Length
1.	"Bellbottoms (Old Rascal)"	8:17
2.	"Flavor Part 1 (Mike D)"	4:46
3.	"Flavor Part 2 (Beck & Mike D)"	4:09
4.	"Soul Typecast (Dub Narcotic)"	3:42
5.	"Greyhound Part 1 (Moby)"	4:14
6.	"Greyhound Part 2 (GZA)"	3:24
7.	"Tour Diary (Original Full-Length Version)"	17:10
8.	"Explo (Plunderphonic)"	2:36
9.	"Blues "XXX" Man (Prince Paul)"	3:21
10.	"T.A.T.B. (For the Saints and Sinners)"	7:24
11.	"Attack (Detroit)"	3:15
12.	"Shakin' (S60 V JSBX)"	4:06
13.	"Lapdance (Benzel-Waters)"	5:53
14.	"Calvin (Zebra Ranch)"	4:01
