= So Happy Together (album) =

Studio album by Grifters
- Released: 1992
- Recorded: 1991, Easley McCain Recording, A Kitchen, Two Living Rooms and The Flower Shop, Memphis, Tennessee
- Genre: Indie Rock, lo-fi
- Length: 36:51 (CD), 17:59, (EP)
- Label: Sonic Noise; SON 002-2(CD); SON 002-1(EP)
- Producer: The Grifters

Grifters chronology
The Kingdom of Jones (1991)	So Happy Together (1992)	One Sock Missing (1993)

Professional ratings
Review scores
Source	Rating
AllMusic	2.5/5 stars
The Encyclopedia of Popular Music	3/5 stars
MusicHound Rock: The Essential Album Guide	2.5/5 stars

So Happy Together is the first full-length album by Memphis indie rock band Grifters. The album was noisy and lo-fi, even by Grifters standards. It was released on the now defunct Chicago label Sonic Noise.

It contains the re-recording "The Want," which debuted as an A Band Called Bud song. Originally released on vinyl as a six-song mini-album, it was extended to a full twelve-track album, though the album only shows ten song titles. The back of the CD tray lists the original tracks apart from the bonus tracks and some of the lyrics to "Wreck" are featured in an image by Greg Harwell.

== Critical reception ==
Trouser Press called the album "a bit overbearing in its negativity, but songs like the droning “Hate” (a litany of antipathies that basks in self-loathing) glean their subtext from the stirring interplay between guitarists Dave Shouse and Scott Taylor."

== Original track listing ==
All tracks are written by Stan Gallimore, Tripp Lamkins, David Shouse, Scott Taylor.

No.	Title	vocals	Length
1.	"Dry Bones"	(instrumental)	1:36
2.	"Hate"	Scott Taylor	2:01
3.	"Tat"	Scott Taylor	4:58
4.	"Clot"	David Shouse	2:43
5.	"The Want"	David Shouse	3:01
6.	"Oar"	Scott Taylor/David Shouse	3:40
Total length:			17:59

== CD track listing ==
All tracks are written by Stan Gallimore, Tripp Lamkins, David Shouse, Scott Taylor.

No.	Title	vocals	Length
1.	"Dry Bones"	(instrumental)	1:36
2.	"Hate"	Scott Taylor	2:01
3.	"Tat"	Scott Taylor	4:58
4.	"Clot"	David Shouse	2:43
5.	"The Want"	David Shouse	3:01
6.	"Oar"	Scott Taylor/David Shouse	3:40
7.	"Wreck"	David Shouse	3:10
8.	"(untitled track)"	(instrumental)	1:32
9.	"Meanwhile"	David Shouse	4:18
10.	"10,000"	Scott Taylor	3:06
11.	"(untitled track)"	(instrumental)	1:23
12.	"(blank track)"	(instrumental)	0:28
13.	"Love Explosion"	David Shouse	4:49
Total length:			36:51

== Album information ==
=== Grifters ===
- Stan Gallimore (not credited)
- Tripp Lamkins (not credited)
- David Shouse (not credited)
- Scott Taylor (not credited)

=== Additional credits ===
- Album art by Greg Harwell
- Engineering on some songs by Doug Easley and Davis McCain, Scott Taylor on most

=== Notes ===
- The Flower Shop is a Memphis florist (Anything Grows), where Shouse and Gallimore worked. The band practiced and recorded there.
