= Plastic Fang =

Studio album by the Jon Spencer Blues Explosion
- Released: April 9, 2002
- Recorded: 2001
- Genre: Punk blues, alternative rock
- Length: 48:20
- Label: Matador
- Producer: Steve Jordan

The Jon Spencer Blues Explosion chronology
Acme (1998)	Plastic Fang (2002)	Damage (2004)

Professional ratings
Review scores
Source	Rating
AllMusic	3.5/5 stars
Drowned in Sound	9/10
Entertainment Weekly	B+
Pitchfork	(2.5/10)

Plastic Fang is the seventh official release by the American punk blues group the Jon Spencer Blues Explosion, released on Matador in 2002. "She Said" was released as a single and a music video was filmed for it. In the video, Jon Spencer is a vampire being hunted by nuns whom he eventually seduces into a striptease en masse, before fighting and dying at the hands of a vampiress.

This album features guest appearances by Dr. John, Bernie Worrell and Willie Weeks and design by Chip Kidd. There are several different versions of this release, and some of them had a DVD included with the album, called Fang Visual, the most complete of which is the Australian release.

== Track listing ==
=== US release ===
1. "Sweet n Sour" - 3:15
2. "She Said" - 4:17
3. "Money Rock'n'Roll" - 3:01
4. "Killer Wolf" - 4:34
5. "The Midnight Creep" - 3:47
6. "Hold On" - 4:54
7. "Down in the Beast" - 4:26
8. "Shakin' Rock'n'Roll Tonight" - 2:52
9. "Over and Over" - 3:50
10. "Mother Nature" - 4:30
11. "Mean Heart" - 4:26
12. "Point of View" - 4:28

=== AU release ===
CD1:

1. "Sweet n Sour"
2. "She Said"
3. "Money Rock'n'Roll"
4. "Killer Wolf"
5. "Tore Up & Broke"
6. "Hold On"
7. "Down in the Beast"
8. "Shakin' Rock'n'Roll Tonight"
9. "The Midnight Creep"
10. "Over And Over"
11. "Mother Nature"
12. "Mean Heart"

CD2:

1. "Point of View"
2. "Do Ya Wanna Get It?"
3. "Maureen"
4. "Alex"
5. "Over And Over" (Techno Animal Mix)
6. "Money Rock'n'Roll" (Sub Species Mix)
7. "Over And Over" (Barry Adamson Mix)

VIDEOS:

1. "She Said" (Directors Cut)
2. "She Said" (Live at 100 Club)
3. "Sweet & Sour"
4. "Point of View" (Live at Brixton)
5. "Shakin' Rock'n'Roll Tonight" (Live at Brixton)

=== JP release ===
1. "Sweet N Sour"
2. "She Said"
3. "Money Rock 'N' Roll"
4. "Ghetto Mom"
5. "Alex"
6. "Hold On"
7. "Over And Over"
8. "Then Again I Will"
9. "Down In The Beast"
10. "Shakin' Rock 'N' Roll Tonight"
11. "The Midnight Creep"
12. "Like A Bat"
13. "Killer Wolf"
14. "Mean Heart"

=== Fang Visual ===
Cover of "Fang Visual" DVD

1. "She Said" (Video - Sigismondi)
2. "Sweet n Sour" (Video)
3. a. "Calvin" (Live) / b. "Mean Heart" (Live) / c. "Sweet n Sour" (Live)
4. a. "2Kindsa Love" (Live) / b. "Flavor" (Live) / c. "Attack" (Live)
5. TV Appearance (InfoPlus)
6. a. "Point of View" (Live) / b. Down in the Beast (Live)
7. Jon Spencer Interview
8. Studio Footage, NYC
9. "Bellbottoms" (Live)
10. "She Said" (Video - 100 Club)
11. "Talk About The Blues" (Live)

== Charts ==
Chart performance for Plastic Fang
Chart (2002)	Peak position
French Albums (SNEP)	44
German Albums (Offizielle Top 100)	94
Italian Albums (FIMI)	35
Norwegian Albums (VG-lista)	16
Scottish Albums (OCC)	69
Swedish Albums (Sverigetopplistan)	47
UK Albums (OCC)	81
UK Independent Albums (OCC)	9
US Heatseekers Albums (Billboard)	16
