= The Jon Spencer Blues Explosion (album) =

Studio album by the Jon Spencer Blues Explosion
- Released: April 24, 1992
- Recorded: 1991
- Genre: Garage rock
- Label: Independent
- Producer: Jon Spencer

The Jon Spencer Blues Explosion chronology
A Reverse Willie Horton (1991)	The Jon Spencer Blues Explosion (1992)	Crypt Style (1993)

The Jon Spencer Blues Explosion is the 1992 debut album by the New York City-based eponymous band. Few copies of the album were produced; however, some songs are featured on the album Crypt Style, released one year after. Additionally, some songs are featured on the album A Reverse Willie Horton, released one year earlier, and considered either a bootleg or the group's true first album, as it contains all studio tracks. All three albums are culled from separate 1991 recording sessions with Kramer and Steve Albini.

== Critical reception ==
Professional ratings
Review scores
Source	Rating
AllMusic	3.5/5 stars
The Encyclopedia of Popular Music	2/5 stars

Spin labeled the album "weird, angular rock, somehow arty and raw at the same time."

== Track listing ==
1. "Write a Song" - 1:53
2. "I.E.V." - 1:45
3. "Exploder" - 2:00
4. "Rachel" - 2:25
5. "Chicken Walk" - 2:53
6. "White Tail" - 2:31
7. "'78 Style" - 1:26
8. "Changed" - 1:05
9. "What to Do" - 2:11
10. "Eye to Eye" - 1:43
11. "Eliza Jane" - 2:02
12. "History of Sex" - 1:46
13. "Comeback" - 3:12
14. "Support-a-Man" - 2:00
15. "Maynard Ave." - 1:57
16. "Feeling of Love" - 1:47
17. "Vacuum of Loneliness" - 3:02
18. "Intro A" - 0:52
19. "Biological" - 2:10
20. "Water Main" - 1:51

== Personnel ==
The Jon Spencer Blues Explosion

- Jon Spencer – lead vocals, guitar, theremin
- Judah Bauer – guitar, backing vocals
- Russel Simins – drums

Additional personnel

- Kurt Hoffmann – tenor saxophone
- Frank London – trumpet
- John Linnell – baritone saxophone
