= Easley McCain Recording =

Recording studio in Memphis, Tennessee

- Industry: Recording studio
- Founded: 1970s
- Founder: Doug Easley
- Headquarters: Memphis, Tennessee

Easley McCain Recording is an American recording studio, based in Memphis, Tennessee, notable for recording musicians such as Tav Falco's Panther Burns, Oblivians, Grifters, Pavement, Sonic Youth, Come, White Stripes, Townes Van Zandt, Pezz, Jeff Buckley, Jon Spencer Blues Explosion, Guided by Voices, Lydia Lunch, Box Tops, Rufus Thomas, Wilco, Cat Power, Modest Mouse, The Amps, The Cooters, The Walkmen, and The Cuts.

== History ==
Easley McCain Recording began in the late 1970s as Doug Easley's rudimentary, four-track recording studio in the woods near the Wolf River bottoms in Memphis, recording blues musicians like Mose Vinson, as well as local rock bands. In the early 1980s Easley operated "Easley Recording" out of a hand-built garage studio behind his home near University of Memphis. During this period, bands such as Tav Falco's Panther Burns came in to record; Alex Chilton produced an album for a Detroit group called The Gories the last year the studio was located in Easley's garage.

By 1990, Easley, with new partner Davis McCain, had found a larger midtown Memphis facility for the recording studio and moved into it by the next year. McCain had been the sound man at a 1980s local alternative music nightspot called The Antenna Club. The new Easley studio site was originally built in 1967 as "the Onyx" for Don Crews, who had been a business partner at American Sound Studios with producer Chips Moman. Moman and Crews parted in 1972, with Crews establishing his own recording studio at the Onyx location.

Easley McCain Recording's business began to attract more clients from outside Memphis in the early 1990s, after local Memphis group the Grifters grew in popularity and advertised the studio's phone number in their liner notes. Indie rock bands from around the country including Pavement, Sonic Youth, and Come began recording there. By 2001 the White Stripes had become a client, which led in turn to a Jack White–produced album by Loretta Lynn to be mixed there by Stuart Sikes.

Others recording at this indie-oriented studio have included Townes Van Zandt, Pezz, Jeff Buckley, Jon Spencer Blues Explosion, Guided by Voices, Lydia Lunch, dahrius, Box Tops, Rufus Thomas, Wilco, Cat Power, Modest Mouse, Kim Deal with her band The Amps, The Bamboozlers (precursors to Ingram Hill), Custard, and Grifters.

On March 2, 2005, the studio's lobby and control room sustained serious damage in a fire.

In 2009, after four years of inactivity, Easley McCain Recording reopened at a brand new location in Memphis. Most of their vintage analog recording equipment survived the fire, and Doug Easley is back engineering, mixing, producing and mastering full-time. His recent clients were The Shakedown, Ben Nichols (Lucero), Harlan T Bobo, Bosco Delrey, Viva L'American Death Ray, the Magic Kids as well as a number of film score/soundtrack projects.

=== Albums recorded at Easley McCain Recording ===
(incomplete)

- Lydia Lunch & Rowland S. Howard - Shotgun Wedding (1991)
- The Young Fresh Fellows - It's Low Beat Time (1992)
- Grifters - So Happy Together (1992)
- The Hilltops - Big Black River (1992)
- Jon Spencer Blues Explosion - Extra Width (1993)
- Grifters - One Sock Missing (1993)
- The Gories - I Know You Fine, But How You Doin' (1994)
- Southern Culture on the Skids - Ditch Diggin' (1994)
- Come - Don't Ask, Don't Tell (1994)
- Grifters - Crappin' You Negative (1994)
- Silver Jews - Starlite Walker (1994)
- Guided By Voices - Under the Bushes Under the Stars (1995)
- Pavement - Wowee Zowee (1995)
- The Amps - Pacer (1995)
- Sonic Youth - Washing Machine (1995)
- Wilco - A.M. (1995)
- Two Dollar Guitar - Burned And Buried (1996)
- Those Bastard Souls - 20th Century Chemical (1996)
- Cat Power - What Would the Community Think (1996)
- Grifters - Ain't My Lookout (1996)
- Jon Spencer Blues Explosion - Now I Got Worry (1996)
- Custard - We Have The Technology (1997)
- Butterflies - Butterflies (1997)
- Grifters - Full Blown Possession (1997)
- The Promise Ring - Nothing Feels Good (1997)
- The Spinanes - Arches and Aisles (1998)
- Jeff Buckley - Sketches for My Sweetheart the Drunk (1998)
- The Box Tops - Tear Off! (1998)
- Those Bastard Souls - Debt And Departure (1999)
- Two Dollar Guitar - Weak Beats and Lame-Ass Rhymes (2000)
- The White Stripes - White Blood Cells (2001)
- Rocket From The Crypt - Group Sounds (2001)
- Modest Mouse - Good News For People Who Love Bad News (2004)
- The Perfect Vessels - Name Our Own Stars (2011)
- Halfacre Gunroom - "Wrecked" (2004)

== Footnotes ==
- Earles, Andrew (July 2, 2004). Indie Magnet: How Easley-McCain Recording became a key player in the indie-rock explosion. Memphis Flyer.
- Lisle, Andria and Davis, Chris (March 3, 2005). Fire at Easley-McCain Studio. Memphis Flyer.
