= Acme (album) =

Studio album by the Jon Spencer Blues Explosion
- Released: October 20, 1998
- Genre: Punk blues, alternative rock
- Length: 45:28
- Label: Matador
- Producer: Calvin Johnson, Steve Albini, Dan the Automator, Suzanne Dyer, Jim Dickinson, Alec Empire

The Jon Spencer Blues Explosion chronology
Controversial Negro (1997)	Acme (1998)	Xtra-Acme USA (1999)

Singles from Acme
- 1. "Talk About the Blues" Released: 1998; 2. "Magical Colors" Released: 1998; 3. "Heavy" Released: 1999; 4. "Calvin" Released: 1999

Professional ratings
Review scores
Source	Rating
AllMusic	3.5/5 stars
Entertainment Weekly	B+
The Guardian	3/5 stars
Houston Chronicle	4/5 stars
Los Angeles Times	3.5/4 stars
NME	7/10
Pitchfork	7.1/10
Record Collector	4/5 stars
Rolling Stone	3.5/5 stars
Spin	7/10

Acme is the sixth studio album by the Jon Spencer Blues Explosion. It was released via Matador Records on October 20, 1998.

A follow-up album was released the following year, featuring B-sides and remixes from Acme. It was released in two versions, Xtra-Acme USA and Acme Plus.

== "Talk About the Blues" music video ==
In late 1998, a music video for the fifth track in the album, "Talk About the Blues", premiered on MTV. The video, directed by Evan Bernard, features movie actors Winona Ryder, Giovanni Ribisi and John C. Reilly as the Blues Explosion, with the actual band members acting in several scenes inspired by classic detective films.

== Track listing ==
Acme track listing
No.	Title	Length
1.	"Calvin"	3:03
2.	"Magical Colors"	4:10
3.	"Do You Wanna Get Heavy"	4:08
4.	"High Gear"	2:07
5.	"Talk About the Blues"	3:58
6.	"I Wanna Make It All Right"	3:45
7.	"Lovin' Machine"	3:44
8.	"Bernie"	3:01
9.	"Blue Green Olga"	3:40
10.	"Give Me a Chance"	3:16
11.	"Desperate"	3:17
12.	"Torture"	4:09
13.	"Attack"	2:29

2010 reissue edition bonus tracks
No.	Title	Length
14.	"Right Place, Wrong Time"	3:38
15.	"The Black Godfather"	3:34
16.	"New Year (Destroyer)"	3:04
17.	"Confused (Sansano)"	2:59
18.	"Hell (Benzel-Waters)"	3:28
19.	"Bacon (Techno Animal)"	4:18
20.	"Lap Dance (Thirlwell)"	8:37
21.	"Blues Power"	3:50

2010 reissue edition bonus disc
No.	Title	Length
1.	"Wait a Minute"	3:48
2.	"Get Down Lover"	3:47
3.	"Confused (Zebra Ranch)"	3:04
4.	"Magical Colors (31 Flavors)"	4:09
5.	"Not Yet"	4:08
6.	"Get Old"	1:46
7.	"Bacon"	3:32
8.	"Blue Green Olga (Benzel-Waters)"	4:30
9.	"Heavy (Stimulated Dummies)"	3:13
10.	"Lap Dance"	3:26
11.	"Leave Me Alone So I Can Rock Again"	5:06
12.	"Soul Trance"	4:28
13.	"Electricity"	2:30
14.	"New Year"	2:58
15.	"Lovin' Machine (Automator)"	3:39
16.	"Chowder"	3:15
17.	"T.A.T.B. (Demo)"	3:21
18.	"Hell (Zebra Ranch)"	3:25
19.	"Torture (Waters)"	3:52
20.	"Bles Explosion Attack (Dub Narcotic)"	4:36
21.	"Calvin (Bagel)"	3:06
22.	"Shhh"	1:36

== Charts ==
Chart performance for Acme
Chart (1998)	Peak position
Australian Albums (ARIA)	85
Swedish Albums (Sverigetopplistan)	35
UK Albums (OCC)	72
UK Independent Albums (OCC)	9
US Billboard 200	180
US Heatseekers Albums (Billboard)	8
