= Extra Width =

Studio album by the Jon Spencer Blues Explosion
- Released: May 24, 1993
- Recorded: July – December 1992
- Studio: Easley Recording (Memphis, TN); Water Works Studio (New York, NY)
- Genre: Punk blues; garage rock
- Length: 36:36
- Label: Matador; Mute
- Producer: Jon Spencer

The Jon Spencer Blues Explosion chronology
Crypt Style (1992)	Extra Width (1993)	Orange (1994)

Professional ratings
Review scores
Source	Rating
AllMusic	4.5/5 stars
Mojo	4/5 stars
Pitchfork	8.4/10
The Rolling Stone Album Guide	3/5 stars
Spin Alternative Record Guide	8/10
Uncut	5/5 stars

Extra Width is the third album by the punk blues group the Jon Spencer Blues Explosion, released in 1993.

== Track listing ==
No.	Title	Length
1.	"Afro"	2:55
2.	"History of Lies"	3:42
3.	"Back Slider"	3:00
4.	"Soul Letter"	2:49
5.	"Soul Typecast"	6:06
6.	"Pant Leg"	2:27
7.	"Hey Mom"	3:00
8.	"Big Road"	3:59
9.	"Train #2"	2:25
10.	"Inside the World of the Blues Explosion"	3:27
11.	"The World of Sex"	3:46

The album was re-released by Mute Records in 2000 with the Mo' Width album as bonus tracks (on one single CD). The cover looks the same as the original release; however, the original front cover and track listing of Mo' Width is added as a cardboard paper.
