= Ashkan Sahihi =

Iranian-American photographer

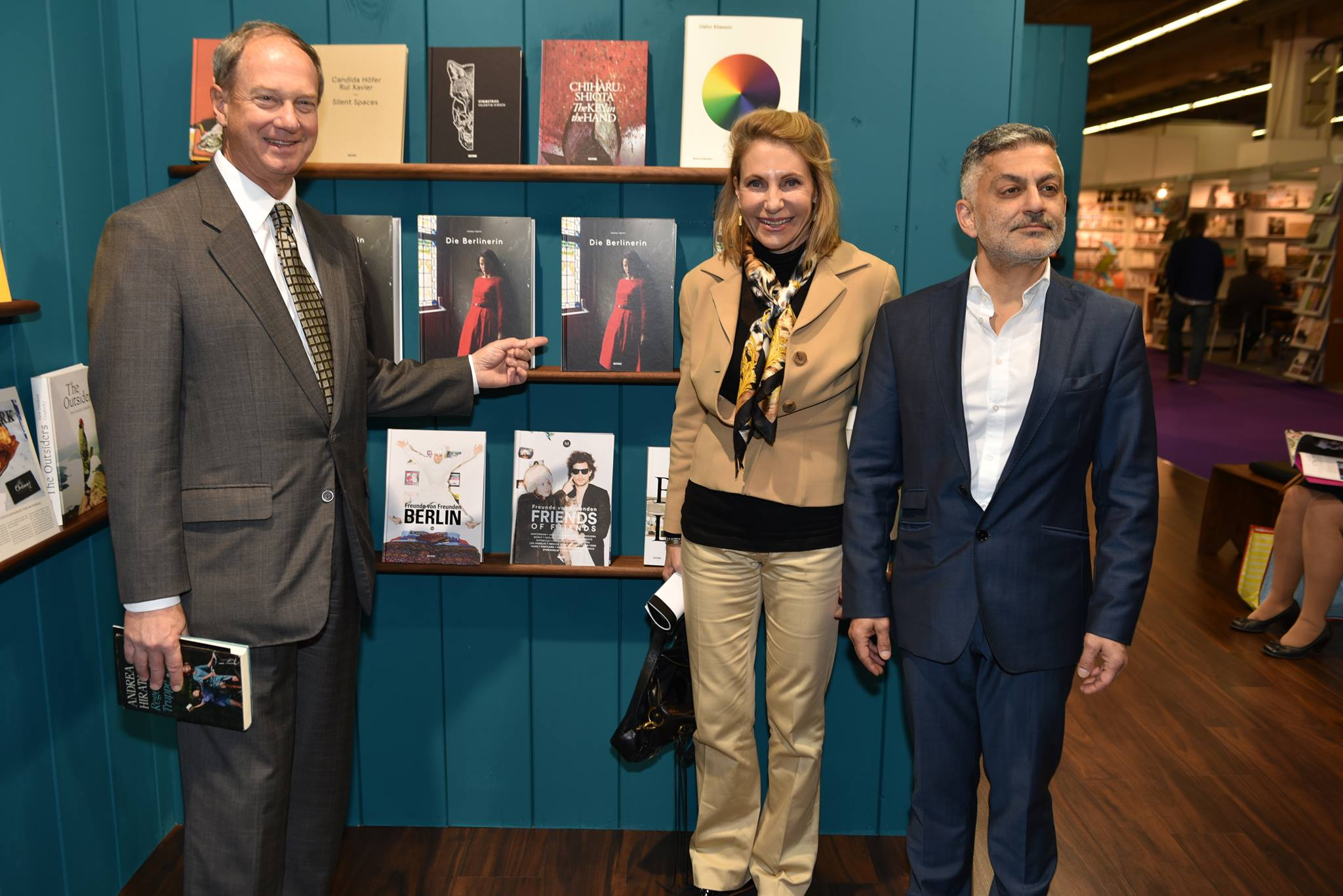
Ambassador John B. Emerson points at the book Die Berlinerin by Ashkan Sahihi (on the right), in which – among others – Ms. Emerson (center) is pictured (2015).

Ashkan Sahihi (born 27 November 1963) is an Iranian-American photographer known for his unique photographic series as well as for numerous portraits of important public figures.

== Life and work ==
Born in Tehran, Iran, Ashkan Sahihi moved with his family to West Germany at the age of seven. Although he began taking photographs as a teenager, Sahihi traces the beginning of his professional trajectory to New York City in 1987, a thriving "pop culture metropolis" where he could do the kind of photography work that he wanted to do, exploring the underbelly of the society around him. Taking assignments from German publications such as the Zeitmagazin and Süddeutsche Zeitung magazine, Der Spiegel, DUMMY and Spex, he photographed subjects like prisoners on death row, players in the hip-hop scene, and the downtown art scene of New York. Eventually, he began to receive commissions from American publications as well, including The New York Times Magazine, The New Yorker, Vice, Rolling Stone, and Vogue.

Put off by the limitations of photojournalism (the expectation that he would illustrate the writer's perspective rather than author a narrative of his own), Sahihi began to embark on independent conceptual series. In the early 2000s, Sahihi has lived and worked in New York, Istanbul, and London, producing bodies of work in each place that attempt to engage the political discourse he deems lacking in substance. Amongst others, he contributed to Istanbul Contrasts und Art and Patronage, both published by Thames & Hudson. In 2011 he followed and documented New York's Occupy Wall Street movement. After moving to Berlin in 2013, he started working on a large scale photo-sociological study dedicated to the cities women and two other series that subsequently were also published as books. He also had his work exhibited several times in Berlin. In March 2020, Sahihi photographed American drag queen, performance artist and musician Christeene for German Interview magazine. A large-scale retrospective of the photojournalistic work was published by DISTANZ in September 2020. The New York Years is a collection of 224 portraits shot in New York since the late 1980s, showing musicians such as David Bowie, 50 Cent, Solange Knowles and Nick Cave, writers John Irving, Siri Hustvedt and Irvine Welsh, actors Willem Dafoe and John Lurie, as well as artists such as Jeff Koons, Louise Bourgeois, Cindy Sherman, and Nam June Paik or galerist and collector Bruno Bischofberger. A selection of about 40 portraits was on display at McLaughlin Berlin in autumn 2020.

== Photographic series ==
In his conceptual works, Sahihis main goal has been to drive forward public discourse on topics he believes have not provoked enough or the right kind of discussion: drugs, gender in the media, women in the military, etc. In his portraits, Sahihi often draws on familiar visual languages yet using them in contexts they are supposedly not suited for. Whilst constantly challenging the comfort level of both the viewer and the subject, Sahihi never removes himself from the line of fire; all of his work requires the artist to immerse himself in uncomfortable situations and challenge his own emotional fortitude.

In the Face Series (18 images), latex-gloved hands manipulate the subjects' features. The Hypnosis Series comprises 8 portraits of hypnotized subjects each experiencing a single emotion, e. g. helplessness, withholding/anger, or regret.

In 2006, Sahihi photographed himself in the homes and with the families of six ex-girlfriends and one ex-wife, imposing himself on the constellations that emerged after he had exited their lives. The Exes Series has been published in several magazines.

For the most well-known of his early conceptual works, the Drug Series, he convinced 11 non–drug users to consume a particular drug, then took their portraits over the course of their trips. The series was born out of Sahihi's frustration with the hypocrisy of the political conversation about drugs in the United States. "By attempting to present an objective image of drug use, the artist addresses the cultural politics that allow our society to simultaneously glamorize the 'drug look' in fashion magazines and the entertainment industry and meanwhile turn a blind eye to the complicated, and vast, problem of drug abuse." Sahihi has exhibited this series at MoMA PS1 in New York City in 2001, the Berlin Academy of the Arts in 2005, and alongside his installation 100 Million in Ready Cash.

Sahihi's photographic series also include Women of the IDF, portraits of female Israeli soldiers; Camp X-Ray Guantanamo Bay, black-and-white landscapes of barbed wire and watch towers; the Cum Series that references US corporate IDs and yearbook photography to comment on the pornografization of everyday culture; the Armpit Series; and the Kiss Series, in which the artist photographed himself kissing 18 women and men of various ethnicities.

Sahihi's most extensive work to date is the study Die Berlinerin, inspired by Clifford Geertz' method of thick description. Using search categories based on age, profession, life plan, social background, etc. he made contact with a wide variety of women living temporarily or permanently in Berlin. Meeting them in settings chosen by the models themselves, Sahihi created a series of 375 portraits that was on display alongside corresponding questionnaires in the Galerie im Körnerpark and Springer Gallery in autumn and winter 2015–2016. The complete series was published by DISTANZ.

Living in Berlin since 2013, "he encountered young, gay men that struck him as oddly familiar. They reminded him of New York in the 1980s, and of the search for new forms of identity. It seemed as if Berlin of the 2010s had replaced the old New York as the city of dreams." Remembering the old New York, a city marked by creativity and freedom but also hit by the HIV/AIDS epidemic that diminished "the creative community by what seemed like half of its most brilliant talents and ravaging its creative power," Sahihi created a series of nude photographs of the Beautiful Berlin Boys. The book was accompanied by an exhibition at Galerie Kehrer in Berlin. A selection of the portraits was reprinted in Benjamin Wolbergs' volume New Queer Photography, published by Kettler in 2020.

The fascination with Barbara Hepworth's Hospital Drawings he shares with sports surgeon Hanno Steckel led to another series published by Kehrer. Sahihi's black and white photographs follow Steckel into The Operating Theatre, capturing the rhythmic play of hands and movements, thus tracing the similarities between artistic and surgical craftsmanship.

In May 2019, Sahihi reenacted Leonardo da Vinci's famous Last Supper with friends and neighbors from Neuköllns Weserstraße neighborhood.

== Exhibitions ==
- 1999 MoMA PS1, New York City (Millennium Warm Up; group exhibition)
- 1999 353 Broadway, New York City (Quiet, an artificial society of people living under surveillance; group exhibition)
- 2000 Andrea Rosen Gallery, New York City (John Connelly Presents: Ashkan Sahihi (Scream, Faces))
- 2000 Art Basel 31 (collaboration by Spex and Andrea Rosen Gallery (Drug Series, Kisses))
- 2000–2001 Andrea Rosen Gallery, New York City (Scream)
- 2001 MoMA PS1, New York City (Drug Series)
- 2003 Axel Raben Gallery, New York City (Cum Shots)
- 2004 Axel Raben Gallery, New York City (Women of the IDF)
- 2005 Akureyri Art Museum; Akureyri, Iceland (100 Million in Cash)
- 2005 Akademie der Künste, Berlin (Drug Series, in: Der Kontrakt des Fotografen; group exhibition)
- 2006 KW Institute for Contemporary Art, Berlin und MoMA PS1, New York City (Drug Series, in: INTO ME / OUT OF ME; group exhibition)
- 2007 Museum Morsbroich, Leverkusen (Drug Series, in: Der Kontrakt des Fotografen; group exhibition)
- 2007 MACRO Testaccio (MACRO FUTURE), Rom (Drug Series, in: INTO ME / OUT OF ME; group exhibition)
- 2008 Kunsthaus Dresden (Drug Series, in: Under Influence; group exhibition)
- 2012 Art Virus Ltd., Frankfurt a. M. (Bilder einer Bewegung, die keine sein dürfte. Occupy Wall Street New York–Frankfurt a. M.; group exhibition)
- 2012 Art Virus Ltd., FFM (Occupy, Prohibition is Now; group exhibition)
- 2015–2016 Galerie im Körnerpark (Die Berlinerin – Das Porträt einer Stadt)
- 2015–2016 Galerie Springer Berlin (Die Berlinerin – Das Porträt einer Stadt)
- 2016–2017 Kehrer Galerie Berlin (Beautiful Berlin Boys)
- 2017 Voies Off-Festival, Arles (Beautiful Berlin Boys, Operating Theatre)
- 2018 48 Stunden Neukölln (Community-Projekt)
- 2019 Weserhalle Berlin (The Last Supper Weserstr.)
- 2020 McLaughlin Berlin (The New York Years)
- 2021 Amtsalon Berlin (The New York Years)

Source: photography-now.com

== Selected book and catalogue publications ==
- Pictures and Their Stories, New York: Fromm International 1992, ISBN 978-0880641418.
- The Vice Guide to Sex and Drugs and Rock and Roll, ed. by Gavin McInnes, Shane Smith and Suroosh Alvi, New York: Warner Books 2003.
- Into Me / Out of Me, ed. by Klaus Biesenbach, New York: Hatje Cantz 2006.
- Hossein Amirsadeghi: Istanbul Contrasts, London: Thames & Hudson 2010, ISBN 978-0954508388.
- Art & Patronage: The Middle East, ed. by Hossein Amirsadeghi, London: Thames & Hudson 2010 (principal photographer), ISBN 978-0500977040.
- Occupy – New York, Frankfurt: eine Bewegung die keine sein dürfte, ed. by Michele Sciurba, Frankfurt a. M.: B3 2012, ISBN 978-3-943758-70-2.
- Das Große Dummy-Buch, Zürich: Kein & Aber 2011, ISBN 978-3036952994.
- Die Berlinerin, Berlin: DISTANZ 2015, ISBN 978-3-95476-101-2.
- Beautiful Berlin Boys, Heidelberg: Kehrer 2016, ISBN 978-3-86828-763-9.
- The Operating Theatre, ed. by Hanno Steckel, Heidelberg: Kehrer 2017, ISBN 978-3-86828-798-1.
- New Queer Photography, ed. by Benjamin Wolbergs, Dortmund: Kettler 2020, ISBN 978-3-86206-789-3.
- The New York Years, Berlin: DISTANZ 2020, ISBN 978-3-95476-338-2.
