= Grifters (band) =

Memphis indie rock band formed 1989

- Also known as: A Band Called Bud, The Grifters
- Origin: Memphis, Tennessee, United States
- Genres: Indie rock alternative rock slacker rock
- Years active: 1989–2001; 2013–present
- Labels: Shangri-La Records; Sub Pop; Darla Records; Simple Machines; Doink
- Members: Stan Gallimore; Tripp Lamkins; David Shouse; Scott Taylor
- Past members: John Stivers; Roy Berry

Grifters is an indie/alternative rock band based in Memphis who have released albums on Darla Records, Doink, Sonic Noise, Shangri-La Records, and Sub Pop Records. The band released five studio albums from 1992 to 1997. In the years following 1997, the band had breaks in activity with some members pursuing other musical projects and with the band sporadically touring in the years after. However, in recent years they have continued to tour on a consistent basis and have stated interest in recording new material. The band has released and reissued some of their material on Bandcamp.

== History ==
=== Founding, early years and Sub Pop records: 1989–1997 ===
"Dave got the band going about eight and half years ago. He found Scott through a lot of tapes and just decided he wanted to work with this weirdo, basically..."

— Tripp Lamkins on founding the band (Sept 1997)

The band originally formed in the late 1980s as A Band Called Bud, with vocalist/guitarist Scott Taylor, bassist Tripp Lamkins, and vocalist/drummer Dave Shouse who founded the band and became its leader. After being renamed Grifters (after the novel by Jim Thompson) by 1990, Shouse joined Taylor on guitar, with Stanley Gallimore taking over on the drums. Songwriting duties were shared between Shouse, Taylor, and Lamkins. For several years in the 1990s, they recorded primarily at Easley McCain Recording and were closely affiliated with Memphis's Shangri-La Records label. Jeff Buckley was a vocal supporter of The Grifters and was close friends with the band.

The band released its first album on the Sonic Noise label in 1992, titled So Happy Together. The album had a very abrasive lo-fi sound with considerable noise, an approach to recording that was later avoided on subsequent releases. Following this, One Sock Missing succeeded in 1993 on Shangri-La Records. The album was similar to the first, albeit featured less lofi and noise signifying the cleaner sound that would become standard on later material. The album was much more successful than the first and garnered the band its first positive critical reception. Soon after, Crappin' You Negative was released in 1994 and garnered even greater critical acclaim, featuring an even mix of lo-fi and commercial production. The album is highlighted as the "pick" of the artist's discography by Allmusic, signifying it as their favorite release of the band.

The band then released Ain't My Lookout in 1996, the first on Sub Pop records. The band developed a clean and commercial sound on the album, with the lo-fi qualities of past material being devoid on this release. Following this, the band released its fifth and final album, titled Full Blown Possession in 1997 on sub pop records. The album largely continued the clean and commercial sound of their recent albums.

=== Disbandment and side projects: 1997–2001 ===
Following the breakup of the band, each member pursued different projects. Dave Shouse worked on his side project Those Bastard Souls started in 1995, later to become his primary band. The project also featured vocalist and violinist Joan Wasser (Joan as police woman), drummer Kevin March (Dambuilders/later Guided by Voices member), Michael Tighe (Jeff Buckley collaborator/guitarist) and bassist/pianist Matt Fields (Red Red Meat).

Those Bastard Souls released two albums, its first in 1996 as an anonymous solo project of Shouse titled Twentieth Century Chemical. With the second titled Debt and Departure in 1999, featuring Wasser, March, Tighe and Fields first introduced on the album. The project became inactive in 2001. The Grifters would tour on a sporadic basis in the following years, but with no more new material since the late 90s.

=== Recent years to present: 2001–present ===
The band had a reunion tour in 2013, followed by another in 2014 to celebrate the 20th anniversary of Crappin' You Negative. As of 2021, the band continues to tour and has shown interest in recording new material.

== Discography ==
as A Band Called Bud:

- Dad full-length cassette (Doink Records, 1989)
- Shark 7 flexi disc with The Martini Age (Kreature Comforts,1989)

=== Albums ===
- So Happy Together LP/CD (Sonic Noise, 1992)
- One Sock Missing LP/CD (Shangri-La, 1993)
- Crappin' You Negative LP/CD (Shangri-La Records, 1994)
- Ain't My Lookout LP/CD (Shangri-la Records/Sub Pop, 1996)
- Full Blown Possession LP/CD (Sub Pop, 1997)
- Possible Obstructed View – Live CD (Limited Edition Self-Produced, 2014)

=== EPs ===
- Disfigurehead EP 7-inch (Doink Records, 1990)
- The Kingdom of Jones EP 7-inch (Doink Records, 1991)
- The Eureka E.P. 10-inch/CD (Shangri-La Records, 1995)
- The Doink Years 10-inch reissue of Disfigurehead and The Kingdom Of Jones (Shangri-La Records, 1996)
- The Doink Years CD reissue of Disfigurehead and The Kingdom Of Jones (Shangri-La Records, 2006)

=== Singles ===
- "Soda Pop" 7-inch (Shangri-La Records, 1992)
- "Corolla Hoist" 7-inch (Shangri-La Records, 1992)
- "Under the Ground" split 7-inch (with Crain; Simple Machines, 1993)
- "Holmes" 7-inch (Darla Records, 1994)
- "Bronze Cast" 7-inch (Shangri-La Records, 1994)
- "Dildozer" split 7-inch (with Fluffy Kitty; Cherry Smash, 1994)
- "I'm Drunk" split 7-inch (with Guided by Voices; Now Sound, 1994)
- "Queen of the Table Waters" 7-inch (Sub Pop Records, 1994)
- "Stream" 7-inch (Derivative Records, 1995)
- "Slipknot" 7-inch (Super 8 Records, 1996)
- "Last Man Alive" 7-inch (Sub Pop Records, 1996)
- "Wicked Thing" 7-inch (Sub Pop Records, 1997)

=== Various-artist compilation appearances ===
- "She Blows Blasts Of Static" on Altered States of America, cassette, (Lime Lizard, UK, 1993)
- "Black Fuel Incinerator" on Why Do You Think They Call It Pop? 10-inch (Pop Narcotic,1993)
- "Make It Happen" on Ten Cent Fix, CD, (Jiffy Boy, 1993)
- "Spaceship" on A Day in the Park, CD, (Now Sound, 1994)
- "Look What You've Done To Me Now" on The Smitten Love Song Comp, CD, (Karate Brand, 1994)
- "Under The Ground" on Working Holiday!, CD, (Simple Machines, 1994)
- "The Want (live)" on Half-Cocked: The Motion Picture Soundtrack CD (Matador, 1995)
- "Roadside Monument" on Mike McGonigal's Chemical Imbalance: 1984-1996, Vol.3, No.1, (Chemical Imbalance, 1995)
- two songs on Barristers: Two Years In The Alley CD, 1996
- "Empty Yard" on Red Hot + Bothered: The Indie Rock Guide Book to Dating CD (Red Hot Organization/Kinetic, 1995)
- "Corolla Hoist (live at WMBR)" on MAGNET/Darla Single 7-inch (Magnet Magazine/Darla Records, 1996)
- "Wicked Thing" on Spring Lineup – A Compilation Of Sub Pop's Heavy Hitters Promo CD, (Sub Pop Records, 1997)
- "Holmes" on The Basement Recordings: Live at Cicero's, CD, (On The Clock, 1997)
- "The Muffin Man" on Rudy's Rockin' Kiddie Caravan CD, (Bloodshot Records, 1997)
- "Radio City Suicide" on Chicago Cab Soundtrack, CD, (Loosegroove Records, 1998)
- five singles on Shangri-La: 10 Years, CD, (Shangri-La Records, 1998)
- two singles on Darla 100, CD, (Darla Records, 2000)
- "Hits Keep Comin" on The Unaccompanied Voice: An A Capella Compilation, CD, (Secretly Canadian, 2000)
- "Confidential" on Shangri-la Projects: B-Sides, CD, (Shangri-La Records, 2006)

=== Bootlegs ===
- No Particular Slogan, (2×CD, singles compilation)
- That's Not French, (live bootleg recorded at The Bottleneck Lawrence, Kansas, 2000)

== Other formats ==
=== Videos ===
- "Banjo" & "Whatever Happened To Felix Cole" – VHS video single (Shangri-La Records 1995)
- "Last Man Alive" (directed by Russell Bates, 1996)

=== Film appearances ===
- Half-Cocked directed by Suki Hawley & Michael Galinsky. The Grifters appear as themselves and perform "The Want" live

== Members ==
- Gordon Scott Taylor: Vocals, Guitar
- William David "Dave" Shouse: Vocals, Guitar, Keyboards
- Russell "Tripp" Lamkins III: Bass, Guitar, Keyboards
- Stanley Noyel Gallimore: Drums
