= Dub Narcotic Sound System =

American musical group

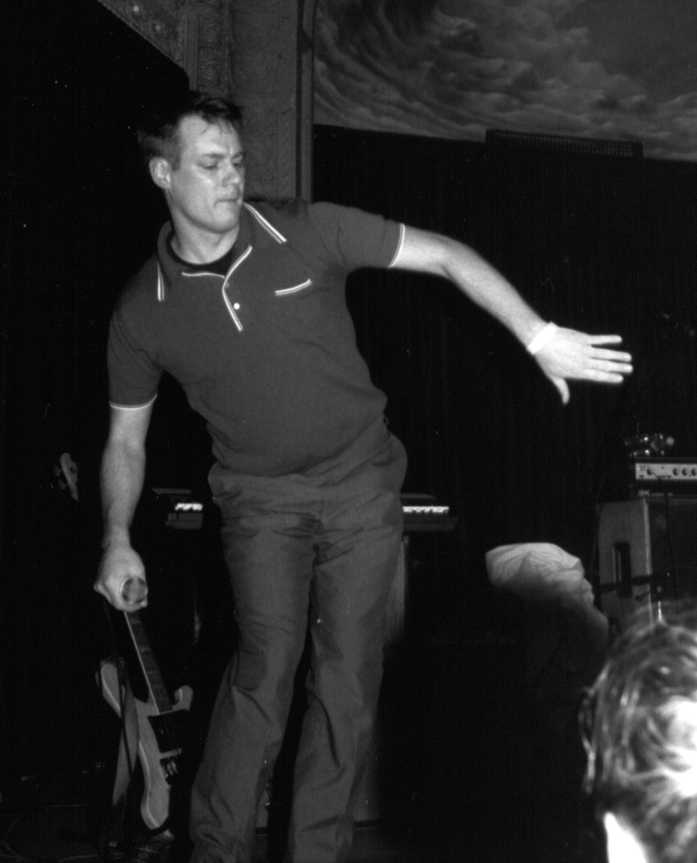

Background information
- Origin: Olympia, Washington
- Genre: Indie rock
- Years active: 1995–2003
- Label: K
- Members: Calvin Johnson; Chris Sutton; Heather Dunn
- Past members: Larry Butler; Brian Weber; Lois Maffeo; Jeff Smith; Jen Smith

Dub Narcotic Sound System (D.N.S.S.) is an Olympia, Washington based indie-funk musical group founded by Calvin Johnson, signed to K Records.

== Origins ==
The band was named after Calvin Johnson's basement recording studio, Dub Narcotic. The band and its members were all based in Olympia, Washington when they were active in the band. Dub Narcotic Sound System has toured in the United States, Japan, Canada and Europe with bands such as Built to Spill, Fugazi, and the Jon Spencer Blues Explosion.

== Critical reception ==
The Register-Guard described the band in 1999 as an "electronica and hip-hop tinged indie combo". The newspaper also criticised Johnson's vocals, citing them as "so low and gravelly, it can, at times, be unbearable". In relation to a 1996 concert at a roller skating rink with Lois Maffeo, they described the music as "dull to dance to, but skates can glide along to it fine".

The Michigan Daily described their album Degenerate Introduction as "an open, airy fusion of punk, funk, dub, indie rock and hip-hop with a lo-fi hue". However, the newspaper criticised Johnson's vocals, saying they were "polarizing and force[s] you to become annoyed as he drowns out the empty beats".

== Discography ==
=== Albums ===
- Hands on the Dial (1994)
- Rhythm Record Volume One (Echos From The Scene Control Room) (1995)
- Boot Party (1996)
- Out of Your Mind (1998)
- Sideways Soul: Dub Narcotic Sound System meets the Jon Spencer Blues Explosion in a Dancehall Style! (1999)
- Degenerate Introduction (2004)

=== Singles & EPs ===
- "Booty Run" (1994)
- "Dub Narcotic" (1994)
- "Fuck Shit Up" (1994)
- "Bite" (1995)
- Industrial Breakdown (1995)
- Ridin' Shotgun (1995)
- "Ship to Shore" (with Lois) (1996)
- Bone Dry (1997)
- "Shake-A-Puddin'" (1997)
- "Wasted/Groove" (1997)
- "Sabley Goodness" (2002)
- Handclappin' (2003)
- "Blood Flow" (2004)
- "You Fuck Me Up" (2004)
