= Shangri-La Records =

Shangri-La Projects
- Founded: 1988
- Founder: Sherman Willmott
- Genre: Indie rock, alternative rock, blues
- Country of origin: U.S.
- Location: Memphis, Tennessee
- Official website: www.shangrilaprojects.com

Shangri-La Projects is a record label in Memphis, Tennessee that grew out of and split off from the Shangri-la Record store in Memphis, Tennessee, and released several of the seminal records of the early 1990s Memphis indie scene. It also manufactured and distributed records for the Sugar Ditch label.

== Label roster ==
- 611
- Citizen's Utilities
- Cornfed
- Jim Dickinson (on Sugar Ditch)
- The Everlasting Doug Easley Experience
- For Her And The Snow
- The Grifters
- Hot Monkey
- Ross Johnson (on Sugar Ditch)
- The Kelley Deal 6000
- Man With Gun Lives Here
- The Memphis Goons
- Othar Turner & His Rising Star Fife & Drum Band (on Sugar Ditch)
- Will Roy Sanders
- The Simple Ones
- The Strapping Fieldhands

== See also ==
- List of record labels
