= Simone Giuliani =

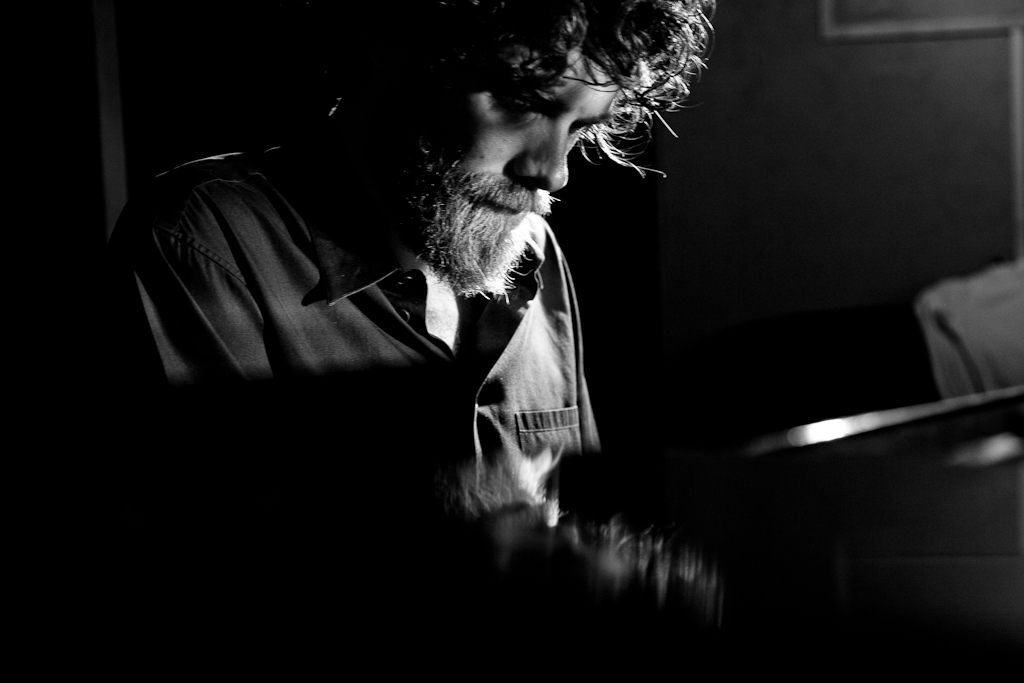
- Recording at Soundtrack Studios, Manhattan, New York (July 2010)

Background information
- Also known as: 4MuLA
- Born: May 1, 1973 (age 52)
- Origin: Firenze, Italy
- Genres: Soundtrack, orchestral, ambient, electronic, experimental, bossanova, funk, jazz
- Occupations: Musician, composer, arranger, record producer, music director
- Instruments: Piano, synths, vocals, computers
- Years active: 1991–present
- Labels: Emunity Records, 1 Infinito
- Website: simonegiuliani.com

Simone Giuliani (born May 1, 1973) is an Italian musician, film composer, arranger, record producer and music director based in Manhattan, New York. He is also a keyboard player and a pianist.

== Background ==
Simone Giuliani was born in Florence, Italy. In the early 90s he worked with the Italian punk-rock band Diaframma as a keyboard player, touring and recording four albums with them. A few years later he moved to the United States where he launched the independent record label Emunity Records and the electronic music acts Racoon and Lazybatusu.

== Music (Production, Arrangement, Remixes & Soundtracks) ==
Giuliani collaborated with Miho Hatori from Cibo Matto and Gorillaz on the soundtrack for the movie Color Me Love and has worked with Grammy Award-winning producer Robert Sadin (Sting, Herbie Hancock) and avant-garde cellist Charles Curtis. Simone has worked on remixes for Beyoncé, Maxwell and Sia. He produced Monday Michiru's album Brasilified featuring a remake of Marcos Valle's hit song Parabéns and Herbie Hancock's Tell Me a Bedtime Story. He collaborated with Cibo Matto on their album Hotel Valentine released on Sean Lennon's label Chimera Music.

Simone wrote the string arrangement for 'Ni Antes... Ni Después', the album by pop/R&B artist Aneeka, nominated as Best New Artist at the 2014 Latin Grammy Awards and New Artist of the Year at the 2015 Lo Nuestro Awards.

He collaborated with producer Jason Olaine on rare live recordings of Miles Davis, Sarah Vaughan, Dizzy Gillespie, Thelonious Monk, Louis Armstrong released by Concord Music Group and Monterey Jazz Festival Records.

Simone also wrote original music for the Volkswagen and Sony Music ad campaigns.

Giuliani is currently working with New York-based composer/guitarist Ian Gittler on a forthcoming music project.

== Music (Live) ==
As a keyboard player/pianist Simone Giuliani has performed with Jovanotti, Yuka Honda's Machina Mia with guitarist/composer Nels Cline and bassist Devin Hoff, Miho Hatori's New Optimism, DJ Logic & Wu-Tang Clan, Timo Ellis, Monday Michiru & Little Louie Vega and the Grammy-nominated contemporary jazz group Groove Collective. Simone is a core member of the band The Happening with Jamie Catto (1 Giant Leap), Dave Randall (Faithless, Sinéad O'Connor), multimedia artist/musician Alex Forster and Renaud-Gabriel Pion (Björk, Antony and the Johnsons).

== Activism ==
With singer/multimedia artist Jihae and Oscar winner Matthias Gohl, Simone is the producer of Let's Come Together, a musical peace movement supporting the United Nations High Commissioner for Refugees (UNHCR) and NGOs in their fight for human rights in the midst of the current global refugee crisis.

Simone Giuliani is a member and Director of Music Programs of MoMENT NYC, a non-profit music education program founded by Genji Siraisi of Groove Collective presenting the history of music in New York City through live performances in public schools.

== Writing ==
Simone Giuliani is a contributing writer of the book 'The Spiritual Significance of Music' published by Xtreme Music in May 2011. He's currently working on the release of his new book.

== Selected discography ==
- Miles Davis Quintet Live at The 1963 Monterey Jazz Festival (MJF Records/Concord)
- Sarah Vaughan Live at The 1971 Monterey Jazz Festival (MJF Records/Concord)
- Louis Armstrong Live at The 1958 Monterey Jazz Festival (MJF Records/Concord)
- Dave Brubeck '50 Years of Dave Brubeck Live at The Monterey Jazz Festival' (MJF Records/Concord)
- Cibo Matto 'Hotel Valentine' (Chimera Music)
- Monday Michiru 'Brasilified' (Billboard Records)
- Smoove 'As If' remix (Acid Jazz Records)
- Natalie Williams 'The Way We Like It' remix (Eastide Records)
- Lazybatusu 'Otherview' (Emunity Records)
- Lazybatusu '00.03' (Emunity Records)
- The Best of MTV Lounge (Sony International)
- Glucklich V (Compost Records)
- Racoon 'Universal Vibes' (Rykodisc)
- Café del Mar Vol. 9 (CDM)
- Diaframma 'Sesso e Violenza' (Flying Records)
- Peppe Voltarelli 'La grande corsa verso Lupionòpolis' (Visage Music)

== Personal ==
He is also known and sometimes credited as 4MuLA.

His great grandmother Armida Ceccuzzi was one of the first professional female performers in Europe, playing mandolin and singing in a traveling circus in the 1880s.

He learned how to read and write music in a barber shop in Molino Del Piano, a small village in Tuscany at age 9.

He studied at Conservatorio Luigi Cherubini in Florence and at The Juilliard School in New York with Conrad Cummings and Daniel Ott.

Simone Giuliani is endorsed by Lexicon Pro Audio®.
