= Ecdysis (album) =

Studio album by Miho Hatori
- Released: 21 October 2005
- Genre: Avant-garde; Indie rock World music
- Length: 39:17
- Label: (Japan) Speedstar International (United States) Rykodisc
- Producer: Miho Hatori

Professional ratings
Review scores
Source	Rating
Allmusic	4/5 stars
Junkmedia	4/5 stars
Pitchfork Media	(7.1/10)

Ecdysis is the first solo album by Japanese musician Miho Hatori. She came to prominence with a series of contributions to diverse bands, including Cibo Matto, Gorillaz, the Beastie Boys, and Smokey & Miho before working entirely as a solo performer. The album was released on October 21, 2005 in Japan under the Speedstar International label. The album was distributed in the United States one year later on 24 October 2006 under the Rykodisc label.

== Album title ==
I grew up near a river where there were a lot of pear fields and every summer I went out to pick up cicada shells. When the cicadas do ecdysis, the shells they leave behind are brown, but they emerge with a beautiful, glistening green color that's impossible to describe. I was thinking a lot about how stunning nature's work is while I was working on this album. If I stay in one spot without changing, I'm not living. We're all living hearts, pumping all the time. Our skin changes once a month, our bodies change everyday. I want to keep changing and evolving in my life and my music. I produced this album by myself so it's very different from what I was doing in Cibo Matto. Ecdysis was an honest word to describe what I was feeling as it evolved.

— Hatori

== Track listing ==
1. "Ecdysis" – 4:26
2. "A Song for Kids" – 3:30
3. "In Your Arms" – 4:06
4. "Barracuda" – 3:13
5. "The Spirit of Juliet" – 4:11
6. "Walking City" – 3:38
7. "Sweet Samsara Part I" – 3:41
8. "Sweet Samsara Part II" – 2:59
9. "Today Is Like That" – 3:46
10. "The River of 3 Crossings" – 3:49
11. "Amazona" – 1:58

== Production ==
I put a lot of insect sounds and images into the songs because I don't want to cut my connection with nature. We're going to the moon and Mars, but we'll never be able to make insects or butterflies. Humans sometimes think they have control over nature, but nature remains stunning and powerful.

— Hatori

== Personnel ==
- Miho Hatori - vocals, synth, beats programs, tambourine, keyboard bass, melodica, Indian ankle bells, percussion, guitar, marxolin, harmonica, beats, shaker, keyboards
- Mauro Rofosco - percussion
- Sebastian Steinberg - bass
- Thomas Bartlett - organ, piano, accordion, keyboards
- Mark de gli Antoni - keyboards
- Fer Isella - keyboards
- Jon Birdsong - cornet, horns, percussion
- Shelley Burgon - harp
- Smokey Hormel - Rhode organ, fluto
- Brandt Abner - Rhode organ
