= Miho Hatori =

Japanese singer and musician

Miho Hatori 羽鳥 美保
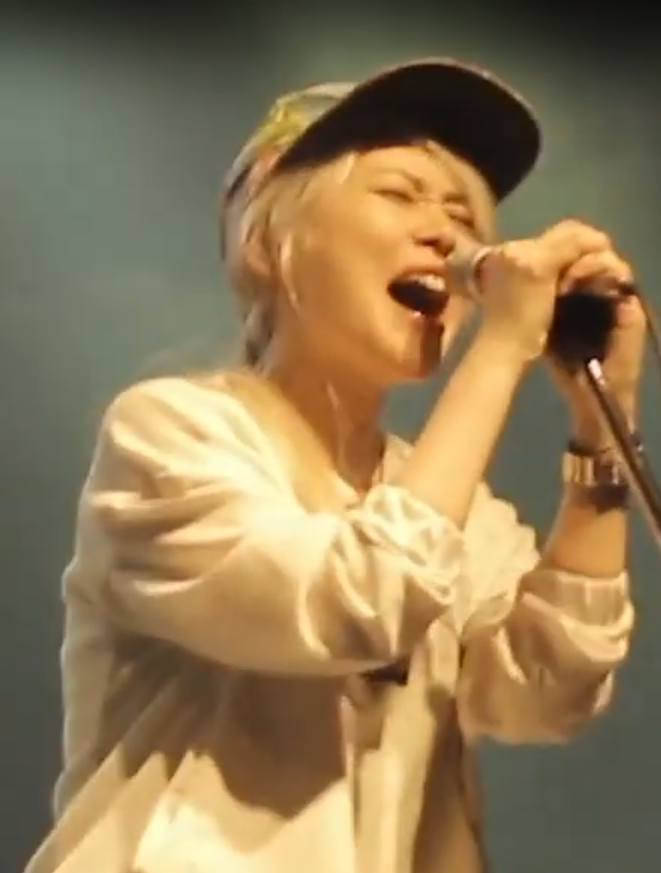
- Miho Hatori performing with Cibo Matto in Argentina in 2014

Background information
- Also known as: Miss Information
- Born: Tokyo, Japan
- Genres: Avant-garde; downtempo; trip hop, indie rock; world music
- Occupations: Singer; songwriter; composer; record producer
- Instruments: Vocals; keyboards; guitar; drums; percussion
- Years active: 1991–present
- Label: Rykodisc
- Formerly of: Kimidori; Cibo Matto; Smokey & Miho; Butter 08
- Website: mihohatori.com

Miho Hatori (羽鳥 美保, Hatori Miho; born in Tokyo, Japan) is a Japanese singer, songwriter, and musician. She is best known as a solo artist, co-founder of New York City band Cibo Matto, and as the first person to provide the voice of Noodle in the virtual band Gorillaz, as well as for her work with the Beastie Boys, Handsome Boy Modeling School, Smokey Hormel, John Zorn, and many more.

== Biography ==
Hatori expressed an early interest in music while growing up in Japan. She worked at used record shop Flash Disc Ranch in Shimokitazawa, Tokyo, where she was exposed to many styles of music and sometimes performed as a club DJ. Her earliest history in a music project dates to 1991 when she joined hip hop group Kimidori; she left the group in 1992.

Hatori moved to New York City in 1993 to study art; she quickly met Yuka Honda through performing together in punk/noise band Laito Lychee, a project that featured Hatori on vocals and violin played through distortion effects pedals. Hatori and Honda co-founded Cibo Matto in 1994 and released their debut album Viva! La Woman in 1996. The duo formation expanded to include Sean Lennon and Timo Ellis on 1997's Super Relax EP, and "unofficial" fifth member Duma Love appeared on their second full-length, 1999's Stereo ★ Type A. Cibo Matto broke up in 2001, but came back with a reunion tour in 2011. They released a third and final follow-up album Hotel Valentine on February 14, 2014.

Hatori worked with her Cibo Matto collaborators outside of the band, contributing to Sean Lennon's solo album Into the Sun, as well as to his scores for the independent films Rosencrantz and Guildenstern Are Undead and Alter Egos; she also appears on Yuka Honda's solo album Eucademix.

While Cibo Matto was touring with Beck, Hatori and Beck guitarist Smokey Hormel discovered a shared love of bossa nova and samba, which eventually resulted in their Brazilian-styled musical project Smokey & Miho. Other artists Hatori has worked with include Handsome Boy Modeling School (on the album So... How's Your Girl?), DJ Towa Tei, Stephin Merritt's The 6ths, The Baldwin Brothers, Beastie Boys, Blackalicious, Peter Daily, Greg Kurstin, Forró in the Dark, John Zorn, The Incredible Moses Leroy, and Patrick Higgins.

Miho performs solo under her own name and various monikers. Her first solo album, Ecdysis, was released in Japan in 2005, coming two years later to the American and European markets. In 2018, she released Amazon To LeFrak as New Optimism and Sequence as Miss Information.

Her 2021 release, Between Isekai and Slice of Life, was inspired by both Édouard Glissant and isekai and slice of life anime––specifically in Demon Slayer, which she watched in 2020 during New York City's COVID-19 stay-at-home order.

== Discography ==
=== As leader/co-leader ===
Release year	Artist	Title	Label	Personnel
1995	Cibo Matto	Cibo Matto	El Diablo Records	Miho Hatori & Yuka Honda
1996	Cibo Matto	Viva! La Woman	Warner Bros.	Hatori & Honda (with Dougie Bowne, Dave Douglas, Rick Lee, Jay Rodriguez, Josh Roseman, Marc Anthony Thompson, Bernie Worrell)
1996	Butter 08	Butter	Grand Royal	Hatori, Honda, Russell Simins, Rick Lee, Mike Mills (with Timo Ellis, Sean Lennon, Evan Bernard)
1997	Cibo Matto	Super Relax (EP)	Warner Bros.	Hatori, Honda, Sean Lennon, Timo Ellis
1999	Cibo Matto	Stereo ★ Type A	Warner Bros.	Hatori, Honda, Lennon, Ellis (with Duma Love, Marc Ribot, Douglas, Curtis Fowlkes, Roseman, Bowne, Sebastian Steinberg, Yumiko Ohno, Vinia Mojica, Sequoia, Smokey Hormel, John Medeski, Billy Martin)
2003	Smokey & Miho	The Two EPs	Varèse Sarabande	Hatori & Smokey Hormel (with Don Falzone, Joey Waronker, Mauro Refosco, Jon Birdsong)
2005	Miho Hatori	Ecdysis	Rykodisc	Hatori (with Refosco, Sebastian Steinberg, Thomas Bartlett, Mark De Gli Antoni, Fer Isella, Birdsong, Shelley Burgon, Hormel, Brandt Abner)
2007	Cibo Matto	Pom Pom: The Essential Cibo Matto	Warner/Rhino/Atlantic	Hatori & Honda
2014	Cibo Matto	Hotel Valentine	Chimera Music	Hatori & Honda (with Yuko Araki, Nels Cline, Aaron Johnson, Glenn Kotche, Michael Leonhart, Mauro Refosco, Jared Samuel, Reggie Watts, Douglas Wieselman)
2018	New Optimism	Amazon To LeFrak	Phantom Limb	Hatori
2018	Miss Information	Sequence	Pioneer Works Press	Hatori
2021	Miho Hatori	Between Isekai and Slice of Life	Virgin Music Label & Artist Services	Hatori (with Kaveh Nabatian, Paul Wilson, Ellis, Austin Williamson, BIGYUKI, Shoko Nagai)

Singles

- "Night Light" from the Ninja Tune album Urban Renewal Program (2002)
- "Baracuda" (2006)
- "Formula X" (2020)

With Gorillaz (as Noodle)

- Tomorrow Comes Today EP (EMI, 2000)
- Gorillaz (Parlophone/Virgin, 2001)
- G-Sides (Parlophone, 2001)
- Spacemonkeyz vs Gorillaz, Laika Come Home (2002)

Guest appearances

- Beastie Boys' "I Don't Know" (Hello Nasty, 1998)
- Beastie Boys' "Hail Sagan" (the Intergalactic EP, 1998)
- Sean Lennon's "Into the Sun" (Into the Sun, 1998)
- John Zorn's Taboo & Exile (1999)
- Spoken word for Handsome Boy Modeling School's "Metaphysical (A Good Day)" (So... How's Your Girl?, 1999)
- Zorn's The Big Gundown: John Zorn Plays the Music of Ennio Morricone (15th Anniversary Edition) (2000)
- The 6ths' "Lindy Lou" (Hyacinths and Thistles, 1999)
- Atami's "August" and "赤い砂漠 (Hypno Ver.)" (Atami, 2001)
- The Baldwin Brothers' "Dream Girl" (Cooking with Lasers, 2002)
- Yuka Honda's Eucademix (2004)
- Towa Tei's "Teenage Mutants" (Sunny, 2011)
- Rap (as New Optimism) on Maika Loubté's "Snappp" (2019)

Remixes & Covers

- Rising Mixes: Ima / Yoko Ono remixed by Cibo Matto, Ween, Tricky, Thurston Moore (1996)
- Cibo Matto covered "Je t'aime... moi non plus" for Great Jewish Music: Serge Gainsbourg (1997)
- "Start" (with the Beastie Boys) for Fire & Skill: The Songs of the Jam (1999)

Soundtracks

- "Ocean in Your Eyes" for the soundtrack to Y tu mamá también (2001)
- "Desire" for Rosencrantz and Guildenstern Are Undead (2009)
- "Fridge Walks" for Alter Egos (2012)

== Film works ==
- Shindo (Japanese film)
- The Killing of a Chinese Cookie
- xXx: AForbidden Love Story (Diesel's short film by Alexi Tan)
