= Lupionópolis =

Coordinates: 22°44′S 51°40′W

- Municipality
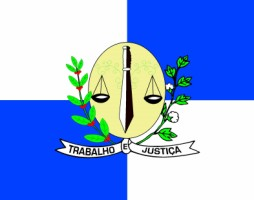
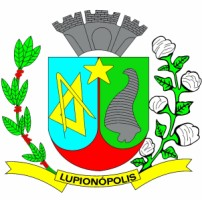
- Flag Coat of arms

- Country: Brazil
- Region: Southern
- State: Paraná
- Mesoregion: Noroeste Paranaense

Population (2020)
  - Total: 4,945
- Time zone: UTC−3 (BRT)

Lupionópolis is a municipality in the state of Paraná in the Southern Region of Brazil.

== Curiosities ==
- In 2023, the Italian songwriter Peppe Voltarelli released an album entitled La grande corsa verso Lupionòpolis (The great race towards Lupionòpolis).

== See also ==
- List of municipalities in Paraná
