= Butter (Butter 08 album) =

1996 studio album

Studio album by Butter 08
- Released: 1996
- Length: 38:54
- Label: Grand Royal
- Producer: Yuka Honda; Russell Simins; Jamey Staub

Butter (also referred to as Butter 08) is the debut album by Butter 08, a band consisting of Cibo Matto leaders Miho Hatori and Yuka Honda, Jon Spencer Blues Explosion drummer Russell Simins, filmmaker Mike Mills, and Skeleton Key percussionist Rick Lee. The album was released in 1996 by the Beastie Boys' label Grand Royal.

== Style ==
NME's Darren Johns called the album a "symposium for the obscurer-than-thou", noting influences including acid rap and Bis. Other genre influences noted include funk, punk rock, arena rock, hip hop, and alternative.

Critics also noted the contrast between Hatori's and Simins' vocals, calling Hatori's "high-flown" and "shrill" and Simins' a "paranoid growl", a "restrained drawl", and "husky". Wired's James Sullivan said Lee provides "foundational scratch guitar" and occasional "mind-bending string-bending" and Mills adds simple basslines which "keep the rhythms gliding atop Simins' pile-driven beats."

== Reception ==
Butter ratings
Review scores
Source	Rating
AllMusic	4/5 stars
Entertainment Weekly	A–
NME	8/10
Rolling Stone	3/5 stars
Spin	5/10

AllMusic's Tim Sheridan called the album "Often hilarious and consistently groovy; in a word, dynamite." Entertainment Weekly's Ethan Smith said the album is "guaranteed to keep your hips shaking all night".

Less positively, Spin's Douglas Wolk called the lyrics "either half-assed ... or inaudible" and said many song's ideas felt like "the result of a moment's whim", such as "Mono Lisa" sounding like Stereolab and "Degobrah" being "fake hardcore".

== Track listing ==
All tracks are written by Butter 08

Butter track listing
No.	Title	Length
1.	"9MM"	2:44
2.	"Shut Up"	3:00
3.	"Butter of 69"	3:24
4.	"Dick Serious"	3:21
5.	"How Do I Relax"	3:40
6.	"It's the Rage"	2:06
7.	"Mono Lisa"	4:56
8.	"What Are You Wearing"	2:30
9.	"Sex Symbol"	3:49
10.	"Degobrah"	2:06
11.	"Hard to Hold"	3:50
12.	"Butterfucker"	3:28
Total length:		38:54

== Personnel ==
=== Butter 08 ===
- Miho Hatori – vocals, piano, organ, drums
- Yuka Honda – Hammond organ, Farfisa, synthesizer, piano, sampler, guitar, backing vocals
- Mike Mills – bass, guitar, backing vocals
- Russell Simins – drums, vocals, guitar, bass
- Rick Lee – guitar, bass, percussion, sampler

=== Additional musicians ===
- Josh Roseman – trumpet (4)
- Ravi Best – trumpet (4)
- Timo Ellis – drums (6)
- Sean Lennon – keyboards (6)
- Evan Bernard – vocals (10)

=== Technical ===
- Yuka Honda – producer
- Russell Simins – producer
- Jamey Staub – producer, mixing engineer
- Howie Weinberg – mastering engineer
- Lance Acord – photography
- Joe Wittkop – photography
- Michael Lavine – photography
