= Memories Are My Only Witness =

Studio album by Yuka Honda
- Released: (United States) 26 February 2002
- Genre: Alternative rock Shibuya-kei; Electronica
- Label: Tzadik
- Producer: Yuka Honda

Yuka Honda chronology
Memories Are My Only Witness (2002)	Eucademix (2004)

Professional ratings
Review scores
Source	Rating
AllMusic	4/5 stars

Memories Are My Only Witness is an album by Yuka Honda.

== Track listing ==
1. "Small Circular Motion"
2. "Why Do We Distrust The Machines We Made?"
3. "You Think You Are So Generous But It’s The Most Conditional “Anything” I’ve Ever Heard"
4. "Driving Down By The Hudson River, We Saw The Blood Red Burning Sky"
5. "Sun Beam—nothing hurts—On A Cold Winter Morning I Walked Back Home: On A Street Paved With Pieces Of Broken Hearts"
6. "Single Silver Bullet"
7. "Some Days I Stay In Bed For Hours"
8. "Schwaltz"
9. "The Last One To Fall Asleep With"
10. "Night Diving"
11. "Liberation #6-Leaving the Memories Behind"

== Personnel ==
- Dougie Bowne – conga programming
- Timo Ellis – guitar, bass
- Yuka Honda – drums/sequencer programming, keyboard/sampler
- Duma Love – beats, bass, keyboard
- Bill Ware – vibraphone, piano
