= Hotel Valentine =

Studio album by Cibo Matto
- Released: February 14, 2014
- Recorded: 2011–2013
- Genre: Shibuya-kei, trip hop, indie pop
- Length: 37:01
- Label: Chimera Music
- Producer: Miho Hatori and Yuka Honda

Cibo Matto chronology
Pom Pom: The Essential Cibo Matto (2007)	Hotel Valentine (2014)

Hotel Valentine is the third and final album by New York City-based band Cibo Matto. It was released through Sean Lennon's label Chimera Music on February 14 (Valentine's Day), 2014.

The album was produced by band members Miho Hatori and Yuka Honda over the course of two years. The project was initially announced in 2012 but was delayed. The official press release touts it as a concept album "with a love story and ghosts in a hotel".

The announcement of its release date was accompanied by the full upload of the video for "MFN", which had previously been released as a 14-second teaser. The video is directed by Georgia and features Reggie Watts. Consequence of Sound described the track as one "that bounds manically between bass-heavy trip-hop, lush pop interludes, lo-fi funk, [and] shimmery synth-pop", further naming its video as a "hyperactive collage of imagery". Spin called the video "a wonderfully colorful sensory overload that is perfectly matched to the wild and swaggering song".

The music video for "Deja Vu" was released on September 18, 2014, in collaboration with director Jean Claude Billmaier. Pitchfork identified the video as "a colorful, datamosh-y new video", and Spin characterizing it as "stylish bubblegum pop-meets-digital-disaster (intentional)."

As well as Watts, the album features appearances from Wilco guitarist Nels Cline, drummer Glenn Kotche, and percussionist Mauro Refosco from the supergroup Atoms for Peace. The band toured North America in February and March 2014 to support the album. Pre-orders for the album came with a handwritten Valentine's Day card from Hatori and Honda.

== Background ==
In the press release for the album, Yuka Honda explained:

"'Hotel Valentine' was the first song we wrote together for this album. It thus represents the genesis of our concept or story, but in a way it seems that explaining too much would prevent listeners from coming to their own conclusions about each song as well as about the whole project. Yes, there is a ghost girl, a hotel, housekeeping ladies and things happen. But they are elusive in nature.

Having spent some time apart, we became more aware of our magical chemistry, our magnetic bond. We both realized we had unfinished business."

In regard to the genesis of the album, Miho Hatori stated: "Hotel Valentine is the cinematic bricolage of Yuka and me. Our medium is music. For me, making an album is like raising a child. We don't know what kind of person (story) they will end up to be."

== Critical reception ==
Professional ratings
Aggregate scores
Source	Rating
Metacritic	74/100
Review scores
Source	Rating
AllMusic	4/5 stars
The A.V. Club	C+
Consequence of Sound	B
Pitchfork	7.0/10
PopMatters	8/10
Rolling Stone	3.5/5 stars
Spin	8/10
Under the Radar	5.5/10

Heather Phares of AllMusic said that Honda and Hatori have included songs on the album "that feel connected to their earlier work, yet not overtly retro", and that the duo bring out the "contrast of brash and ethereal moods at the heart of their music to the fullest". Phares felt the album is marked by two distinct sides, "with half the album representing the bustling, kinetic real world and the other reflecting the afterlife of the hotel's spectral guest". She singled out "the pretty, mercurial pop of 'Déjà Vu', which features some extra-playful rapping from Hatori" as "a standout from the album's louder first half, along with the grooving '10th Floor Ghost Girl' and the irresistibly bouncy 'MFN'". For its second half, Phares remarked that "'Empty Pool' showcase the duo's undimmed flair for seductive yet approachable atmospheres" and concluded by saying that Hotel Valentine "might be Cibo Matto's most whimsical album yet", giving it four out of five stars.

In a positive review of the album for Pitchfork, Nate Patrin stated that the mood "stands out the most", and that "the paranormal angle to this album is simultaneously odd and mournful, with enjoyable quirks like Hatori's deadpan rapping throughout and some characteristically goofy interjections from Reggie Watts on 'Housekeeping' offset by more uncertain perspectives and anxious melodies." Elsewhere, Patrin noted that the different styles of the album—"occasional leanings towards deep-bass microhouse revival ('Empty Pool') and M.I.A.-goes-!!! dance-punk ('10th Floor Ghost Girl')[, ...] the rickety but sinuous acid-jazz charge of 'Emerald Tuesday'; the title track's codeine Tropicalia; [and] the swooning acoustic-guitar soul of closer 'Check Out'"—are "engaging" and "sound [...] unconcerned with trendwatching. They reveal how many possibilities Cibo Matto have always been open to".

Reviewing the album for Spin, Jon Young judged that the album feels "more effortless and fully realized than either Stereo Type A or their celebrated 1996 debut Viva! La Woman, which both could seem too pleased with their own charming ingenuity". Young highlighted that "Valentine purports to be a concept album, though it's debatable how cohesive said concept is", but also praised the duo's attempts to "inspire something" in listeners through "contemplating 'the sea of horror' and exhorting, 'Don't close your eyes from fear' amid a slinky '60s-lounge vibe in 'Déjà Vu', or concluding, 'Long may we wave as endless light' on the final track, the delicate and spooky 'Check Out'." Giving the album a score of 8 out of 10, Young summarized that as an ostensibly "supernatural tale, Hotel Valentine challenges the listener to reflect on life, death, and nothingness."

Austin Trunick of Under the Radar labeled Hotel Valentine a "loose, wonky concept album", and opined that "MFN" is "the only track which approaches the off-kilter energy of a classic like 'Birthday Cake'; too much of the remainder dissolves into one another, and little else captivates." The A.V. Club's Chris Mincher wrote that while "the album's sonic patchwork is the intended result, [...] the whimsical genre-jumping feels a bit tired; the rapid experimentation that came off as vibrant and brash in the '90s alt-music scene doesn't accomplish nearly as much in 2014." Despite conceding that the duo "show occasional flashes of matured songwriting—particularly on the smoky, jazz-inflected title track", Mincher closed with "Hotel Valentine is a fine addition to the limited canon of colorful post-punk all-girl trip-hop records, but can't avoid sounding like the relic that label implies."

== Track listing ==
All songs written by Yuka Honda and Miho Hatori.

Hotel Valentine track listing
No.	Title	Length
1.	"Check In"	3:14
2.	"Déjà Vu"	4:18
3.	"10th Floor Ghost Girl"	3:33
4.	"Emerald Tuesday"	3:19
5.	"MFN"	3:28
6.	"Hotel Valentine"	3:42
7.	"Empty Pool"	4:11
8.	"Lobby"	3:59
9.	"Housekeeping"	4:01
10.	"Check Out"	3:16

Japanese bonus tracks
No.	Title	Length
11.	"Front Desk"	1:16
12.	"Party Time Feeling"	3:20
Total length:		41:37

South American bonus track
No.	Title	Length
11.	"Chica Fantasma" ("10th Floor Ghost Girl" Spanish version)	3:32
Total length:		40:33

- In the original press release, track 3 was referred to as "10th Fl. Ghost Girl", and track 9 was titled "Maid Song (House Keeping)".

== Credits and personnel ==
Credits adapted from liner notes.

- Cibo Matto – drum machines, keyboards, phone apps and other sound devices, programming, synth bass and voices
- Yuko Araki – drums (1 and 3)
- Michael Brauer – mixing
- Sabino Cannone – mastering (for MoReVoX)
- Nels Cline – guitars (2, 5 and 10)
- Simone Giuliani – engineering
- Ryan Dilligan – engineering
- Georgia – album artwork and additional cover art
- Miho Hatori – cover art collage
- Aaron Johnson – trombone (2 and 4)
- Glenn Kotche – drums (10)
- Michael Leonhart – trumpet (2 and 4)
- Emily O'Brien – album art design
- Mauro Refosco – percussion (4, 6 and 8)
- Jared Samuel – bass (1, 2 and 8), keyboards (4, 8, 9), synth bass (1, 2, 3, 5, 8 and 9) and vocals (3, 8 and 9)
- Reggie Watts – special guest vocals (5 and 9)
- Douglas Wieselman – saxophone (3 and 6)

== Charts ==
Chart performance for Hotel Valentine
Chart (2014)	Peak position
US Billboard 200	168
US Independent Albums (Billboard)	33
US Top Heatseekers (Billboard)	6
US Top Rock Albums (Billboard)	46
