= Eucademix =

Studio album by Yuka Honda
- Released: (United States) September 21, 2004
- Genre: Alternative rock; Shibuya-kei; Electronica
- Label: Tzadik Records
- Producer: Yuka Honda

Yuka Honda chronology
Memories Are My Only Witness (2002)	Eucademix (2004)	Heart Chamber Phantoms (2010)

Professional ratings
Review scores
Source	Rating
AllMusic	4/5 stars
Pitchfork Media	(7.5/10)

Eucademix is an album by Yuka Honda.

== Track listing ==
1. "Humming Song (Alone Together)" – 3:44
2. "I Dream About You" – 3:33
3. "When the Monkey Kills" – 3:26
4. "Limoncello" – 2:57
5. "Some Things Should Be Kept Unsaid" – 2:57
6. "Seed of Seed of Peach" – 3:53
7. "Twirling Batons in My Head" – 2:55
8. "How Many Times Can We Burn This Bridge" – 4:08
9. "Parallel" – 3:06
10. "Why Are You Lying to Your Therapist" – 3:36
11. "Phantomime" – 2:42
12. "Spooning with Jackknife" – 3:27

== Personnel ==
- Brandt Abner – keyboards
- Thomas Bartlett – vocals
- Trevor Dunn – bass
- Timo Ellis – guitars, drums
- Petra Haden – vocals
- Miho Hatori – vocals
- Yuka Honda – drum programming, bass, guitar, piano, keyboards, sampler, vocals
- Japa Keenon – drum machine
- Phantom – rain
- Marc Ribot – guitars
