= The Two EPs =

Compilation album by Smokey & Miho
- Released: September 30, 2003
- Genre: Bossa nova
- Label: Os Afro Sambas
- Producers: Smokey Hormel; Miho Hatori; Joey Waronker

The Two EPs is a compilation by Smokey & Miho. The album is composed of the Tempo De Amor EP for the first five tracks and Smokey & Miho EP for remaining five tracks.

== Track listing ==
1. "Tempo De Amor" – 4:26
2. "Consolacao" – 4:28
3. "Bocoche" – 2:47
4. "Canto De Iemanja" – 6:05
5. "Canto Do Caboclo Pedra Preta" – 5:36
6. "Summer Rain" – 4:14
7. "Orixa and Iemanja" – 2:00
8. "Blue Glasses" – 4:28
9. "Nzage" – 4:42
10. "Ocean In Your Eyes" – 3:59

- Japanese Edition (人間の土地/Ningen no Tochi )

1. "Ocean In Your Eyes" – 3:59
2. "Summer Rain" – 4:14
3. "Orixa and Iemanja" – 2:00
4. "Blue Glasses" – 4:28
5. "Nzage" – 4:42
6. "Canto De Passaro" – 2:07
7. "Tempo De Amor" – 4:26
8. "Consolacao" – 4:28
9. "Bocoche" – 2:47
10. "Canto De Iemanja" – 6:05
11. "Canto Do Caboclo Pedra Preta" – 5:36
12. "Nana" – 2:13

== Personnel ==
- Don Falzone — bass and percussion
- Smokey Hormel — guitar, percussion, electric bass, marimba, vocals, sampling, shaker, drum Machine, wurlitzer, doussn'gouni, and hand drums.
- Joey Waronker — percussion, drums
- Mauro Refosco — dumbek, percussion, conga, repique, surdo, cuica, shaker, tambur, loop, and Native American drums
- Miho Hatori — triangle, vocals, bass drums, hand drums, shaker, angklung, loop
- Jon Birdsong — tuba, cornet, horn, peck horn
