= Half Horse, Half Musician =

EP by Sean Lennon
- Released: 10 February 1999
- Recorded: Sear Sound, New York City
- Genre: Rock
- Length: 29:00
- Label: Grand Royal/Toshiba EMI
- Producer: Yuka Honda

Sean Lennon chronology
Into the Sun (1998)	Half Horse, Half Musician (1999)	Friendly Fire (2006)

Half Horse, Half Musician is a 1999 EP by Sean Lennon. It features three remixes from his debut album Into the Sun ("Queue", "Spaceship" and "Into The Sun") as well as original material. The EP was produced by Yuka Honda only released in Japan.

Made #1 on KTUH's charts on the week of February 1, 1999.

== Track listing ==
1. "Queue (Radio Mix)" - 3:35
2. "Spaceship (Radio Mix)" - 4:17
3. "Dream" - 2:15
4. "Heart & Lung (Texas Motel Version)" - 4:25
5. "5/8" - 4:57
6. "Pyramid" - 4:50
7. "Happiness (On The Bus Version)" - 2:58
8. "Into The Sun (Moog Remix)" - 3:43

== Singles ==
- "Queue (Radio Mix)"
