= The Baldwin Brothers =

Chicago-based electronica band

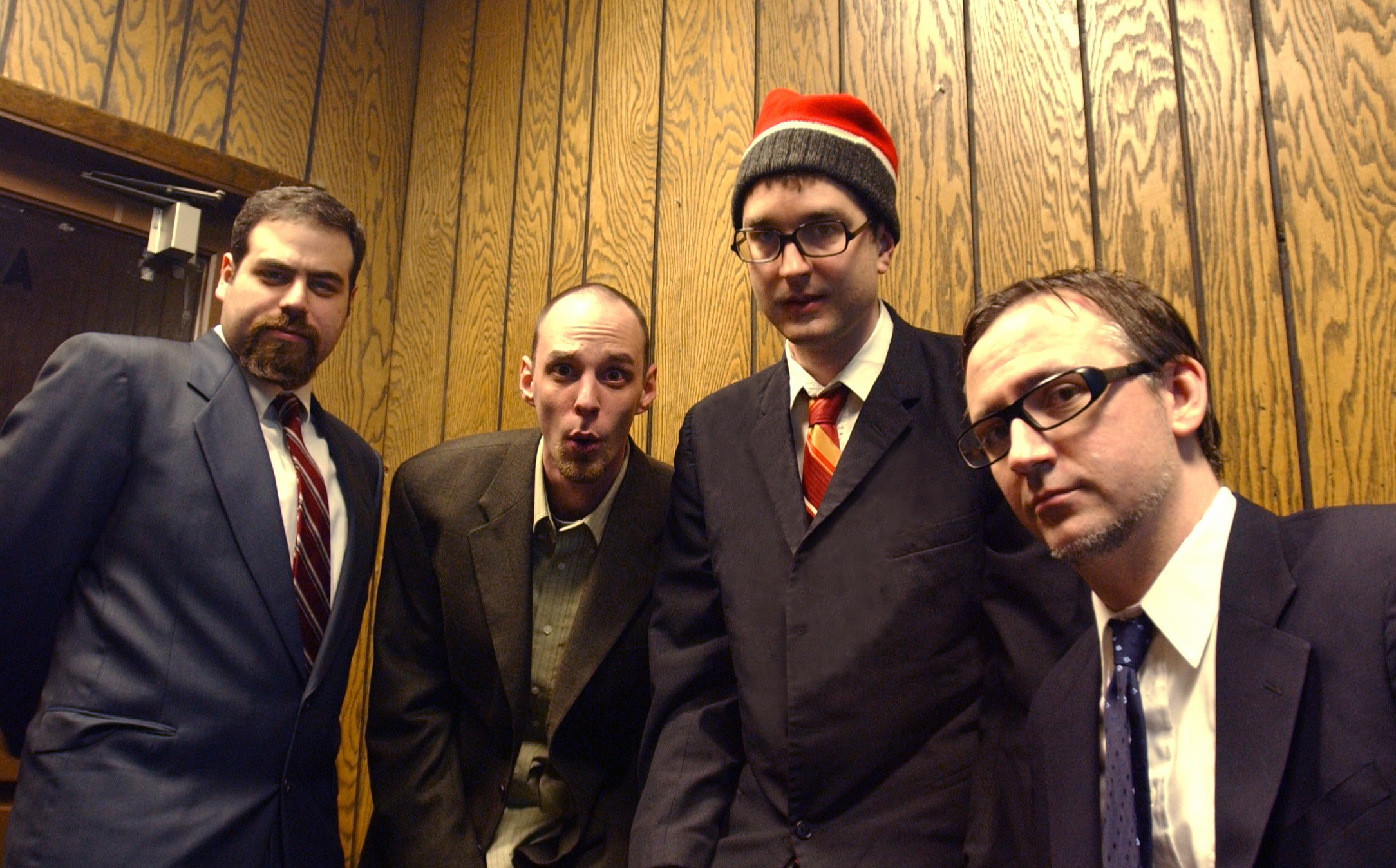

Background information
- Origin: Chicago, Illinois, U.S.
- Genres: Electronica, jazz, pop music
- Years active: 1983–present
- Labels: The Orchard; TVT Records
- Members: Jason Hinkle; TJ Widner; Dan Gottesman; Oren Kopperl
- Past members: Jimmy Deer; J.B. Royal; Zebulun

The Baldwin Brothers are an American, Chicago-based lounge/electronica duo, composed of Jason Hinkle and TJ Widner. The two met in junior-high school and have been composing electronic dance, pop and jazz music since 1983. The band signed with TVT Records in 2001 and are now represented by The Orchard (music label) after their buyout of TVT's music catalog. Their first full album, Cooking With Lasers was produced by Dave Trumfio and The Baldwin Brothers and was released in 2002. The track "Funky Junkyard" was featured in Warren Miller's 2002 feature "Storm." "Urban Tumbleweed" which features rapper Barron Ricks of Cypress Hill on vocals, was featured in the video game Amplitude for PlayStation 2. An early version of the song "The Bionic Jam" was also used in the PS2 game ATV Offroad Fury 2 under the title "8 Cylinder Jam". Their single "Dream Girl" features guest vocals by Miho Hatori (of Cibo Matto) and was featured on a CD produced & distributed by American Eagle Outfitters. A 12" vinyl single of "Dream Girl" was released in February 2002 and included a remix of the song by Vancouver, BC based house artist Pilgrims Of The Mind. "Ether" features guest vocals by Geri Soriano-Lightwood of Supreme Beings of Leisure and "Deep Down" features guest vocals by Angie Hart of Frente!.

Their second album, Return of the Golden Rhodes, was released on October 10, 2006. The album was also produced by Dave Trumfio and The Baldwin Brothers and includes musical contributions from Mark Lanegan (Screaming Trees/Mad Season/Queens Of The Stone Age), Sarai (rapper), Justin Porée of Ozomatli, Lisa Kekaula of The Bellrays, David Randall (AKA The Wrekked Train) of Lo Fidelity Allstars and Julio Davis of The J. Davis Trio.

== Discography ==
=== Albums ===
- Two Soft Spoken Geniuses (1986) (limited release, audio-cassette only)
- Cooking with Lasers (2002)
- Return of the Golden Rhodes (2006)

=== Other ===
- 1000 Years of Hits (2000) - live promo
- TVT 3381 (2001) - promo
- Funk Shui EP (2001) - EP
- Dream Girl (2002) - Single
