= MFN =

MFN may refer to:

- Metromedia Fiber Network, now known as AboveNet
- Most favoured nation, in international relations
- Multi-frequency network, in wireless telecommunications
- Museum für Naturkunde, a natural history museum in Berlin, Germany
- Music for Nations, a British record label
- MFN, the IATA code for Milford Sound Airport, New Zealand
- "MFN", a song by Cibo Matto from their 2014 album Hotel Valentine
