= Working for Vacation =

Single by Cibo Matto

from the album Stereo Type A
- B-side: "Everybody Loves the Sunshine"; "Vamos a la Playa"
- Released: August 4, 1999
- Genre: Shibuya-kei, rock
- Length: 3:15
- Label: Warner Bros.
- Songwriter(s): Cibo Matto
- Producer(s): Yuka Honda

Cibo Matto singles chronology
"Know Your Chicken" (1996)	"Working for Vacation" (1999)	"Moonchild" (1999)

"Working for Vacation" is the first single from Cibo Matto's second album, Stereo Type A, released in 1999. B-side "Vamos a la Playa" was later included on the 2007 compilation Pom Pom: The Essential Cibo Matto.

== Track listing ==
Japanese pressing

1. "Working for Vacation"
2. "Everybody Loves the Sunshine"
3. "Vamos a la Playa"
