= Stereo Type A =

Studio album by Cibo Matto
- Released: June 8, 1999
- Studio: Sear Sound, New York City; Magic Shop, New York City; Studio 4 Recording, Pennsylvania
- Genre: Alternative rock; indie pop; shibuya-kei; lounge; trip hop
- Length: 57:04
- Label: Warner Bros.
- Producer: Yuka Honda

Cibo Matto chronology
Super Relax EP (1997)	Stereo Type A (1999)	Pom Pom: The Essential Cibo Matto (2007)

Singles from Stereo Type A
- 1. "Spoon" Released: May 26, 1999; 2. "Working for Vacation" Released: August 4, 1999; 3. "Moonchild" Released: 1999

Stereo Type A (stylized as Stereo ★ Type A) is the second studio album by Cibo Matto released in 1999. As the group disbanded in 2001, it was their last studio album prior to their 2011 reunion. The album peaked at number 171 on the Billboard 200, and also reached the top spot of CMJ's College charts.

== Background ==
While having a strong focus on atmospheric and ambient sounds and melody (particularly in "Moonchild"), Stereo Type A also contains a broad range of styles, reaching into hip hop territory on "Sci-Fi Wasabi" (with additional vocals by Duma Love), and heavy metal on "Blue Train". Furthermore, "Clouds" and "Mortming" contain heavily vocoded vocals.

In their interview with the band, Barnes & Noble noted the band moving away from writing songs about food, opining the album is a "diverse collection of tracks that includes metal-edged rockers, lounge-influenced pop, pithy hip-hop -- and only one song about culinary delicacies ('Sci-Fi Wasabi')." In the same interview, Yuka spoke about the album's title:

When we decided to make this record, Miho and I talked about a lot of things that were on our minds: what was happening around us and how we felt about what happened with [the perception of] Viva! La Woman. For three days we were just sitting around talking and talking instead of writing music. And we kept bumping into that subject a lot: how we have to deal with stereotypes so much, and how it can be very hard, because the people who have these stereotypes aren't even aware of it.

== Critical reception ==
Professional ratings
Review scores
Source	Rating
AllMusic	3/5 stars
The Boston Phoenix	3.5/4 stars
The Encyclopedia of Popular Music	4/5 stars
Entertainment Weekly	B+
Los Angeles Times	3/4 stars
Melody Maker	4/5 stars
The New Zealand Herald	2/5 stars
Rolling Stone	3.5/5 stars
The Rolling Stone Album Guide	2/5 stars
Uncut	3/5 stars

Several critics noted the album's difference from the group's debut, regarding it positively as a progression of style and a maturation. The album received positive reviews upon its release, with Melody Maker calling it "album of the year so far. Purely joyous pop." Time Out magazine also named it "pure pop LP of the year so far."

Heather Phares of AllMusic says of the album: "Relying less on samples and more on their latent funk and jazz elements, Stereotype A sounds like summer in New York -- eclectic, hot, and funky. ...Stereotype A's overall sound is more direct and less fanciful than of their debut album Viva! La Woman." Independent publication SOMA Magazine stated: "Stereotype A confirms that the best way to make pop music is by combining multiple styles... Combined with Yuka Honda's style for sampling and Miho's sensual vocals, Stereotype A is a complete success."

== Track listing ==
All songs written and composed by Cibo Matto, unless otherwise specified.

1. "Working for Vacation" – 3:15
2. "Spoon" – 4:06
3. "Flowers" – 2:59
4. "Lint of Love" (Cibo Matto, Duma Love) – 6:10
5. "Moonchild" – 5:13
6. "Sci-Fi Wasabi" – 3:43
7. "Clouds" – 3:27
8. "Speechless" – 4:32
9. "King of Silence" – 4:55
10. "Blue Train" – 5:21
11. "Sunday Part I" – 3:19
12. "Sunday Part II" – 3:38
13. "Stone" – 3:17
14. "Mortming" (Dougie Bowne) – 3:09

The Japanese release includes the bonus tracks "Backseat" and "Country".

== Personnel ==
- Miho Hatori – vocals, shaker, acoustic guitar, art direction, drawing
- Yuka Honda – producer, sampler and sequencer, organ, piano, electric piano, synthesizer, harpsichord, vocoder, vocals, mixing (14)
- Sean Lennon – electric bass, synth bass, drums, electric guitar, acoustic guitar, percussion, synth, vocoder, vocals, twelve-string guitar, delay pedal
- Timo Ellis – drums, bass, vocals, electric guitar, acoustic guitar, eight-string bass, cymbal, slamming door

Additional musicians ("special guests")

- Duma Love – vocal, percussion, beat box, turntable
- Marc Ribot – electric and acoustic guitar
- Dave Douglas – trumpet
- Curtis Fowlkes – trombone
- Josh Roseman – trombone, horn arrangement (4)
- Dougie Bowne – hi-hat, cymbals
- Sebastian Steinberg – bass
- Yumiko Ohno – Moog, backup vocals
- Vinia Mojica – backup vocals
- Sequoia – backup vocals
- Smokey Hormel – acoustic guitar
- John Medeski – Clavinet
- Billy Martin – percussion

Recording personnel

- Chris Shaw – engineer, mixing (1, 3, 10, 12, 13, 14)
- Tom Schick – engineer
- The Butcher Bros. – engineer, mixing (2, 4, 5, 6, 8, 9)
- Martin Bisi – engineer
- Zak – arrangement and mixing (7)
- Dan the Automator – mixing (11)
- Bob Ludwig – mastering
- Chaki/CZA – additional engineering
- Juan Garcia – additional engineering
- John Riegart – additional engineering
- Dirk Grobelny – additional engineering
- Manny Lecuona – additional engineering
- Mikey Bones Malak – additional engineering

Additional personnel

- Pascale Willi – art direction, design and photography

== Charts ==
Chart performance for Stereo Type A
Chart (1999)	Peak position
US Billboard 200	171
US Heatseekers Albums (Billboard)	8
