= Pom Pom: The Essential Cibo Matto =

Compilation album by Cibo Matto
- Released: March 20, 2007
- Recorded: 1995–1999
- Genre: Rock, indie rock, trip hop, Shibuya-kei, samba
- Length: 76:44
- Label: Warner Bros.; Rhino; Atlantic

Cibo Matto chronology
Stereo Type A (1999)	Pom Pom: The Essential Cibo Matto (2007)	Hotel Valentine (2014)

Professional ratings
Review scores
Source	Rating
AllMusic	4.5/5 stars
PopMatters	8/10
Times-Standard	4/5 stars

Pom Pom: The Essential Cibo Matto is a compilation album by Cibo Matto, released in 2007. It collects material released from 1995 to 1999.

== Critical reception ==
PopMatters gave the album a mostly positive review, writing: "As a monument and tribute to one of the most unique musical duos in the past decade, it may not be the most complete document ever assembled, but it doesn’t have to be: Cibo Matto doesn’t need to win your heart over in 19 songs -- they can do it in just one." The Times-Standard called Cibo Matto "the best band of the 1990s" and considered the album to be a "solid introduction to an important band."

== Track listing ==
1. "Sugar Water" – 4:29
2. "Spoon" – 4:06
3. "Sci-Fi Wasabi" – 3:43
4. "Clouds" – 3:26
5. "King of Silence" (Dan the Automator Remix) – 5:00
6. "Moonchild" – 5:11
7. "Flowers" – 2:58
8. "Stone" – 3:15
9. "White Pepper Ice Cream" – 5:11
10. "Know Your Chicken" – 4:21
11. "Birthday Cake" – 3:16
12. "Beef Jerky" – 2:27
13. "Working for Vacation" – 3:20
14. "Le Pain Perdu" – 3:28
15. "Artichoke" – 6:36
16. "Swords and a Paintbrush" – 3:45
17. "Backseat" – 4:50
18. "Vamos a la Playa" – 3:22
19. "Apple" – 4:00

== Personnel ==
- Miho Hatori
- Yuka Honda
