= Into the Sun (Sean Lennon album) =

Studio album by Sean Lennon
- Released: May 8, 1998
- Studios: Sear Sound, New York City; Magic Shop, New York City
- Genres: Alternative rock; experimental rock
- Length: 48:50
- Label: Grand Royal
- Producer: Yuka Honda

Sean Lennon chronology
Into the Sun (1998)	Half Horse, Half Musician (1999)

Singles from Into the Sun
- 1. "Home" Released: April 13, 1998

Into the Sun is the debut studio album by musician Sean Lennon. It was released by the Beastie Boys' label Grand Royal (distributed by Capitol Records, a division of EMI which had been the longtime home of Sean's father John Lennon) on May 8, 1998, in Japan and on May 19, 1998, in the United States.

== Background ==
Into the Sun was recorded during Lennon's time performing with Timo Ellis alongside Yuka Honda, who was Lennon's girlfriend at the time and also produced and performed on the album. Lennon has said it was "inspired by my girlfriend". Into the Sun was recorded at Sear Sound in New York, with the exception of the track "Queue", which was recorded at another New York studio, The Magic Shop. The album was engineered and mixed by Tom Schick at Sear Sound and mastered by Bob Ludwig at Gateway Mastering Studios.

A voice on the final track, "Sean's Theme", which softly speaks "Goodnight, Sean", is sometimes mistakenly attributed to father John Lennon; however, it is, in fact, that of Walter Sear, an owner of Sear Sound. Sean has said it is in tribute to his father, whose tribute to Sean, "Beautiful Boy (Darling Boy)" closes with "Goodnight, Sean. See you in the morning, bright and early."

== Critical reception ==
Professional ratings
Review scores
Source	Rating
AllMusic	2.5/5 stars
Entertainment Weekly	B
The Guardian	4/5 stars
Los Angeles Times	3.5/4 stars
NME	1/10
Pitchfork	7.5/10
Rolling Stone	3.5/5 stars
Spin	7/10
The Times	7/10
USA Today	3/4 stars

The Chicago Tribune wrote that "Lennon displays a fine grasp of pop conventions and delivers shimmering examples with the bossa nova-flavored title track and the breezy summer companion 'Two Fine Lovers'."

== Track listing ==
All songs written by Sean Lennon, except where noted.

1. "Mystery Juice" – 5:26
2. "Into the Sun" – 3:22
3. "Home" – 3:05
4. "Bathtub" (Lennon, Yuka Honda) – 4:00
5. "One Night" – 2:06
6. "Spaceship" (Lennon, Timo Ellis) – 4:17
7. "Photosynthesis" – 6:46
8. "Queue" (Lennon, Honda) – 3:45
9. "Two Fine Lovers" – 3:17
10. "Part One of the Cowboy Trilogy" – 1:48
11. "Wasted" – 1:31
12. "Breeze" – 3:57
13. "Sean's Theme" – 5:52
14. "Intermission" (Japanese bonus track) – 5:36
15. "5/8" (Japanese bonus track) – 4:48

== Personnel ==
Credits for Into the Sun adapted from liner notes.

- Sean Lennon – vocals, guitars, bass guitar, drums, keyboards, piano, drum machine, Omnichord, Jew's harp, harmonica, musical saw, percussion, artwork
- Yuka Honda – sequencing, sampling, guitars, vibraphone, keyboards, piano, drum machines, Omnichord, glockenspiel, thumb piano, percussion, vocals
- Miho Hatori – vocals and percussion on "Into the Sun"
- Timo Ellis – drums on "Mystery Juice", "Home" and "Spaceship"; electric guitar, bass guitar and backing vocals on "Spaceship"
- John Medeski – Hammond C3 organ on "Queue"
- Dave Douglas – trumpet on "Photosynthesis" and "Sean's Theme", horn arrangement on "Sean's Theme"
- Josh Roseman – trombone on "Photosynthesis"
- Greg Ribot – flute on "Photosynthesis"
- EJ Rodriguez – percussion on "Photosynthesis"
- Brad Jones – upright bass on "Photosynthesis"
- Kenny Wollesen – drums, shaker on "Photosynthesis", marimba and timpani on "Queue"
- Little Eric Wood – Intergalactic-Tape-Machine on "Spaceship"
- Chaki – cymbal on "Bathtub", engineering (assistant)
- Walter Sear – vocals on "Sean's Theme"
- Fred Kevorkian – digital editing
- Tom Schick – engineering
- John Reigart – engineering (assistant)
- Bob Ludwig – mastering

== Charts ==
Chart (1998)	Peak position
Japanese Albums (Oricon)	50
UK Albums (Official Charts)	90
US Billboard 200	153
US Heatseekers Albums (Billboard)	4
