= Cooking with Lasers =

Cooking With Lasers

Studio album by The Baldwin Brothers
- Released: April 9, 2002
- Genre: Electronica, jazz, pop
- Length: 47:15
- Label: TVT Records
- Producer: Dave Trumfio, The Baldwin Brothers

The Baldwin Brothers chronology
Two Soft Spoken Geniuses (1986)	Cooking With Lasers (2002)	Return of the Golden Rhodes (2006)

Professional ratings
Review scores
Source	Rating
Allmusic	3/5 stars

Cooking With Lasers is the 2002 debut album from The Baldwin Brothers.

== Track listing ==
All songs written and performed by The Baldwin Brothers except where noted.

1. "That's Right" – 3:18
2. "Funky Junkyard" – 3:25
3. "Dream Girl" feat. Miho Hatori – 4:52
4. "The Bionic Jam" – 4:02
5. "Lava Lamp" – 4:16
6. "A Word From Our Sponsor" – 0:20
7. "Slowly At First" – 3:37
8. "Deep Down" feat. Angie Hart – 3:29
9. "Viva Kneivel" – 4:47
10. "Urban Tumbleweed" feat Barron Ricks– 3:37
11. "Somebody Else's Favorite Song" – 3:41
12. "Ether" feat. Geri Soriano-Lightwood – 4:03
13. "A Word From The Doctor" – 0:05
14. "Are You There Margaret? It's Me God." – 3:43
- Track 3 written by The Baldwin Brothers, Dave Trumfio and Miho Hatori
- Track 4 written by Oliver Nelson
- Track 8 written by The Baldwin Brothers and Dave Trumfio
- Track 10 written by The Baldwin Brothers and Barron Ricks

12" single "Dream Girl" released February 2002

Side A 1. Dream Girl feat. Miho Hatori 2. Dream Girl [Instrumental]

Side B 3. Dream Girl - Pilgrims of the Mind Re-Mix

== Personnel ==
=== The Baldwin Brothers ===
- T.J. Widner – Rhodes, synthesizers and programming
- Jason Hinkle – Drum kit, electronic bass guitar, synthesizer and programming
- Jimmy Deer – Electric and upright bass, guitar and programming
- JB Royal – Turntables and programming

=== Other performers ===
Featuring:

- Miho Hatori – Vocals on track 3
- Angie Hart – Vocals on track 8
- Geri Soriano-Lightwood – Vocals on track 12
- Barron Ricks – Vocals on track 10

Also featuring:

- Jesse De La Peña – Turntables
- Steve Gillis – Drum kit
- Charlie St. Cyr Paul – Drum kit, percussion
- Paul Mertens – Piccolo and alto flute; alto, tenor and baritone saxophone
- Dave Max Crawford – Trumpet, flugelhorn
- Dave Trumfio – Percussion, vocals
- Zebulun Barnow (credited as Mr. Bonanza) – Upright bass
- Nora O'Connor – Vocals
- Chris Moulios – Sampler
- Dirty MF and Vice Verse – Vocals

=== Production ===
- Produced by Dave Trumfio and The Baldwin Brothers
- Engineered by Dave Trumfio, Mike Zirkel, Chris Moulios and The Baldwin Brothers
- Mastered by Scott Hill, Classic Sound, New York City, New York
- A&R by Leonard B. Johnson

=== Samples ===
- Track four's Bionic Jam uses samples from the television show The Six Million Dollar Man.
