= Double Vision (3OH!3 song) =

Single by 3OH!3

from the album Streets of Gold
- Released: June 15, 2010
- Genre: Dance-pop; electropop; electronic rock
- Length: 3:10
- Label: Photo Finish
- Songwriters: Matt Squire; Benny Blanco; 3OH!3
- Producers: Benny Blanco; Matt Squire; 3OH!3

3OH!3 singles chronology
"My First Kiss" (2010)	"Double Vision" (2010)	"Hey" (2010)

Music video
- "Double Vision" on YouTube

"Double Vision" is a song by 3OH!3 from their album Streets of Gold. The song, which was released as the third promo single as part of the "Countdown to Streets of Gold", also doubles as the album's official second single. The song has been added to Radio 1's B Playlist in the United Kingdom. The official remix features rapper Wiz Khalifa. A Simlish version of this song is also featured on the soundtrack for The Sims 3: Late Night video game expansion pack.

== Critical reception ==
David Jeffries of AllMusic praised the song as one of the album's "big, vibrant, well-crafted productions", commenting that both "Double Vision" and "Déjà Vu" "might as well be Katy Perry singles".

== Chart performance ==
In the United States, "Double Vision" debuted at number 89 on the Billboard Hot 100 chart for the issue dated July 3, 2010. The song re-entered the chart for the issue dated November 6, 2010, spending a total of four nonconsecutive weeks on the chart. The song also became a top 40 hit on the Mainstream Top 40 chart, peaking at number 37.

In Canada, the song peaked at number 49 on the Canadian Hot 100 on July 3, 2010. On July 11, 2010, "Double Vision" peaked at number 42 on the Australian ARIA Singles Chart. Despite appearing on BBC Radio 1's B Playlist, "Double Vision" only peaked at number 133 on the UK Singles Chart upon release.

== Music video ==
The music video was directed by Evan Bernard. The video premiered on August 19, 2010. The video resembles browsing through a page on the Internet, with various people (including the 3OH!3 duo) performing actions on a static background picture to mimic short video clips or advertisements as the "page" periodically scrolls down.

== Track listings and formats ==
Digital download
No.	Title	Length
1.	"Double Vision"	3:10
2.	"Double Vision" (Sidney Samson Remix)	5:23
3.	"Double Vision" (music video)

Digital download (Remix)
No.	Title	Length
1.	"Double Vision" (featuring Wiz Khalifa)	3:34

== Credits and personnel ==
- Sean Foreman – producer, writer, lead vocals
- Nathaniel Motte – producer, writer, lead vocals, drums, keyboards, programming
- Benny Blanco – producer, writer, background vocals, drums, keyboards, programming
- Matt Squire – producer, writer, drums, keyboards, programming, guitars, engineering, vocal editing
- Steve Tippeconnic – tambourine, engineering assistant
- Larry Goetz – engineering assistant
- Jeremy "J Boogs" Levin – vocal editing assistant
- Jimmy James – production assistant
- Serban Ghenea – mixing at MixStar Studios (Virginia Beach)
- John Hanes – engineered for mix
- Tim Roberts – assistant engineered for mix

Credits and personnel adapted from "Double Vision" CD single liner notes.

== Charts ==
Chart performance for "Double Vision"
Chart (2010)	Peak position
Australia (ARIA)	42
Canada Hot 100 (Billboard)	49
UK Singles (OCC)	133
US Billboard Hot 100	87
US Pop Airplay (Billboard)	37

== Release history ==
Release history and formats for "Double Vision"
Region	Date	Format	Versions	Label	Ref.
United States	June 15, 2010	CD	Original	Photo Finish	
Various	August 31, 2010	Digital download	Remix	Photo Finish	
United Kingdom	September 27, 2010	Digital download	Original	Photo Finish	
Various	October 12, 2010	Digital download	Original	Photo Finish	
