= Heart Chamber Phantoms =

Studio album by Yuka Honda
- Released: (United States) 26 January 2010
- Genre: Rock, avant-garde, electronica, Jazz
- Length: 45 minutes
- Label: Tzadik
- Producer: Yuka Honda

Yuka Honda chronology
| Eucademix (2004) | Heart Chamber Phantoms (2010) |

Heart Chamber Phantoms is Yuka Honda's third solo album, released in 2010 by Tzadik Records.

== Track listing ==
| Title | Length | Ref |
|---|---|---|
| "Phantom With An Armor" | 4:09 | |
| "Hydrosphere" | 4:46 | |
| "Last Night, Late, By The Lake" | 4:56 | |
| "Heart Chamber, Part I: Rock" | 4:03 | |
| "Heart Chamber, Part II: Zoe" | 4:12 | |
| "Waters on Mars" | 3:44 | |
| "Little Hope" | 4:42 | |
| "Robot Elephant's Tears" | 4:01 | |
| "Cycle Of Water" | 6:00 | |
| "Don't Be So Naive" | 5:36 | |

== Personnel ==
- Yuka Honda - Pro Tools, keyboard, sampler, bass, tenorion, guitar, percussion, vocals
- Sean Lennon - drums, synth bass, percussion
- Dougie Browne - drums
- Michael Leonhart - trumpet, flugelhorn, mellophone, vibraphone, bass, wine glass, keyboard, percussion
- Shimmy Hirotaka Shimizu - guitar
- Erik Friedlander - cello
- Pete Drungle - piano
- Jeff Hill - bass
- Courtney Kaiser - vocals
- Scott Seader - vocals
