= Servco Pacific =

American company

Servco Pacific Inc. is a privately held American company based in Hawaii, with offices in Australia. It was founded in 1919, and has interests in the mobility, musical instruments, and capital investment sectors.

== Mobility ==
The company's roots are in the automotive industry, and it also provides vehicle distribution and retail. Servco is the exclusive distributor of Toyota, Lexus, and Subaru vehicles in Hawaii.

Servco Pacific operates over 30 dealerships for various brands, including Toyota, Lexus, Subaru, and Chevrolet, across Hawaii and Australia. Recent expansions include the acquisition of Big Island Toyota. Servco also operates Hui Car Share, a station-based car-sharing service in Honolulu. The company also provides industrial equipment, such as forklifts, to businesses in Hawaii.

== Musical instruments ==
Servco has expanded its portfolio to include the musical instruments industry. Servco is a majority stakeholder in Fender Musical Instruments Corporation. In 2025, in partnership with Creator Partners, it purchased the musical instrument marketplace Reverb from Etsy. The company has also invested in Roland Corporation, a manufacturer of keyboards, synthesizers, and other music equipment.
