= Rioux (musician) =

American producer

- Also known as: Rioux
- Born: Erin Rioux; August 1, 1990 (age 36); Rochester Hills, Michigan, United States
- Origin: Brooklyn, New York, United States
- Genres: Electronic, Psychedelic, Experimental
- Occupations: Musician, Songwriter, Producer
- Instruments: Guitar, Singing, Bass, Trumpet, Drums
- Years active: 2010–present
- Website: rioux.fm

Erin Rioux (pronounced ree-yoo) is an electronic psychedelic record producer, vocalist, and curator based in Brooklyn who makes music under the stage name Rioux. His work merges technology with traditional instrumentation, particularly guitar and bass guitar, to create a rhythmic yet cerebral sonic environment.

== Career ==
=== 2011 – 2014 ===
Originally from the Detroit area, Rioux now resides in Brooklyn where he also runs his own event series and record label for electronic music called Connect. In 2011 he released his first full-length LP, Everything You Need Is Right Here and in the following year he released his critically acclaimed EP Come On All You Ghosts which featured the single "Find the Reason".

=== 2014 – Now ===
Late in 2012 Rioux began his multimedia event series, Connect, which celebrates artistic innovation across different mediums and in electronic music. Early in 2014 Rioux expanded the event series into a record label focusing on electronic music. In 2014 Rioux released a string of singles including 'Trails,' 'Maze1,' and 'Lucifer,' which then culminated into his System Preferences EP with the final single 'Tree Torrent.' Rioux collaborated with digital media artist Cabbibo in creating a virtual environment for the EP.

=== Collaborations ===
In the summer of 2012 Rioux collaborated with Trinidadian-American astrophysicist & saxophonist Stephon Alexander to create their collaborative record Here Comes Now, out on August 4 of 2014 Rioux's record label Connect. The album features no-wave artist Arto Lindsay and will explore the connection between science and music, namely the creation of the universe.

Here Comes Now was given a positive score of 7.2 by Pitchfork (Pitchfork Media) before the album was even released. Pitchfork said

"Rioux's propulsive, cheery beats give the album its momentum. The music mostly races forward with gently twinkling synths and drums, punctuated by long saxophone solos and short riffs."

On September 5, 2014 Here Comes Now was named ″Sunset Album of the Week″ by one of Sydney, Australia's leading independent radio stations FBi Radio.

Also in September of that year, Rioux joined Cibo Matto to open for them on a few of their fall tour dates in the US.

== Discography ==
=== Studio albums ===
- 2011: Everything You Need Is Right Here
- 2014: Here Comes Now (with Stephon Alexander)

=== EPs ===
- 2012: Come On All You Ghosts
- 2013: Supersymmetry
- 2014: System Preferences
- 2015: Evolver

=== Singles ===
- 2013: Spirit Calling / Miniatures
- 2014: Trails
- 2014: Maze1
- 2014: Lucifer
