= System Preferences (EP) =

EP by Rioux
- Released: 21 April 2014
- Genre: Electronic
- Label: CONNECT
- Producer: Erin Rioux, Grant Jefferson

Rioux chronology
Super Symmetry (EP) (2013)	System Preferences (2014)	Here Comes Now (2014)

System Preferences is an EP by New York City-based electronic music artist Rioux, released on 21 April 2014.

== Credits ==
- Erin Rioux - Recording, producing, performing, mixing, mastering and artwork
- Grant Jefferson - Juno synthesizer on "Tree Torrent"

== Track listing ==
No.	Title	Length
1.	"Trails"	5:33
2.	"Maze1"	3:56
3.	"Lucifer"	7:02
4.	"Tree Torrent"	3:42
Total length:		20:13

== See also ==
- 2014 in music
