= Reverb.com =

Online marketplace for music equipment

- Type: Private
- Industry: Musical instruments
- Founded: 2013; 13 years ago
- Founder: David Kalt
- Headquarters: Chicago, Illinois, U.S.
- Key people: Ben Stahl (CEO)
- Owners: Creator Partners and Servco (2025–present)
- Number of employees: 270 (2022)
- Parent: Etsy (2019–2025)
- Website: reverb.com

Reverb.com is an online marketplace for new, used, and vintage musical instruments, like guitars, amps and effects pedals, including ones used by notable musicians. It also lists consumer and pro studio mixers, recorders, and associated audio equipment. Reverb was founded in 2013 by David Kalt, and roughly 85 percent of its employees are musicians. As of 2016, Reverb.com was a multimillion-dollar business and, as of 2017, it had more than 10 million monthly visitors. In 2019, Etsy acquired Reverb.com for $275 million; in 2025, Etsy announced it was selling Reverb.

== History ==
Reverb was founded in 2013 by David Kalt, shortly after he purchased the musical instrument store Chicago Music Exchange and reportedly became frustrated with then-available options for buying and selling guitars online.

=== Funding ===
In November 2013, Reverb secured $2.3 million in funding from investors including Cheap Trick's Rick Nielsen, Lightbank co-founders Brad Keywell and Eric Lefkofsky, David Lowery of Cracker and Camper van Beethoven, Silicon Valley entrepreneur Eric Ries, and country music star Brad Paisley. The company raised another $4.2 million in January 2015 before announcing an additional $25 million led by global growth equity investor Summit Partners in December of the same year.

In August 2017, the company announced another $15 million in funding from 65 investors, including PayPal co-founder Max Levchin, Silicon Valley investor Roger McNamee, former Twitter COO Adam Bain, and Jon Oringer, CEO of Shutterstock.

=== Growth and international expansion ===
In August 2017, Reverb was named No. 18 on the Inc 5000 list of fastest-growing private companies, with 12,327 percent three-year growth (2013–2016.) In 2016, the company generated $16 million in revenue and supported $240 million in sales of new and used equipment through its platform. As of December 2017, the company anticipated closing out the year with close to $400 million in sales. In August 2016, Reverb hired its first on-the-ground employees in the UK, France, and Australia. In the same month, the company launched its mobile app outside of North America. Within a year of its expansion into Europe, the company grew its users in the region by 700 percent and its sales in the region by 300 percent. As of 2017, the company has additional team members in Germany and Japan.

In late 2017, it launched Reverb LP, an online marketplace for LPs and other physical music, and the Reverb Foundation, with non-profit supporting programs and initiatives to increase access to music education, equipment, and playing opportunities.

=== Acquisition and sale by Etsy ===
In August 2019, Etsy completed the acquisition of Reverb.com for $275 million.

In April 2025, Reverb was acquired from Etsy by Creator Partners and Servco, returning it to independent ownership.

== Business model ==
Reverb allows sellers to create free listings for musical instruments and other related equipment. Reverb then charges a commission fee to the seller and a percentage fee for credit card processing upon sale. To help users determine market values for instruments, Reverb has a price guide of real-time transactional data. It offers iPhone and Android apps that include the site's main features. As of 2017, it offered in-person support in the UK, the Netherlands, Australia, Germany, France and Japan.

The company also provides informative content, such as demo videos and how-to articles to drive traffic to the website.

== Notable artist sales ==
In addition to shops from individuals and dealers, Reverb has hosted sales for a number of notable artists, including:

- Steve Albini (sold mics from Nirvana's In Utero)
- Jimmy Chamberlin of The Smashing Pumpkins
- Billy Corgan of The Smashing Pumpkins
- Alessandro Cortini of Nine Inch Nails
- Mike Gordon of Phish
- Green Day
- Frank Iero
- Ray Lamontagne
- Linkin Park
- Nils Lofgren of the E Street Band
- Maroon 5
- J Mascis of Dinosaur Jr.
- Brent Hinds of Mastodon
- Kevin Shields
- Steve Vai
- Bill Ward of Black Sabbath
- Deryck Whibley
- Wilco
