= Viva! La Woman =

Studio album by Cibo Matto
- Released: January 16, 1996
- Studio: Electric Lady (New York City); Sunset Sound Factory (Los Angeles)
- Genre: Trip hop; avant-pop; alternative hip hop
- Length: 48:12
- Label: Warner Bros.
- Producer: Cibo Matto; Mitchell Froom; Tchad Blake

Cibo Matto chronology
Cibo Matto (1995)	Viva! La Woman (1996)	Super Relax (1997)

Singles from Viva! La Woman
- 1. "Birthday Cake" Released: 1995; 2. "Know Your Chicken" Released: 1995; 3. "Sugar Water" Released: 1996

Viva! La Woman is the debut studio album by the band Cibo Matto, released on January 16, 1996, by Warner Bros. Records.

The tracks "Birthday Cake" and "Know Your Chicken" were first released as singles in 1995. Following the release of Viva! La Woman, the latter was reissued as a single in July 1996. Music videos were produced for "Know Your Chicken" and "Sugar Water", directed by Evan Bernard and Michel Gondry, respectively.

== Background ==
Warner Bros. Records signed Cibo Matto after the band's 1995 self-titled EP caught the label's attention. The tracks on Viva! La Woman, Cibo Matto's first album for the label, reflected the band's live performances, utilizing pre-recorded samples and loops. Cibo Matto instrumentalist Yuka Honda later expressed regret that she did not stand up for herself when others discouraged her from replacing the samples and loops with new recordings.

== Composition ==
Stereogum's James Rettig classified Viva! La Woman as a trip hop album. Throughout the album, vocalist Miho Hatori's alternately sung, rapped, and whispered performances are backed by Yuka Honda's hip hop-inspired sound collages. New York writer Chris Norris described Hatori and Honda as avant-pop musicians who on Viva! La Woman "weave found sounds, Muzak, and orchestral textures" into "atmospheric" songs. In The New Rolling Stone Album Guide, critic Rob Sheffield described the music as a mixture of hip hop, dub, lounge, and pop.

The album's lyrics balance humorous themes in "Beef Jerky", "Birthday Cake", and "Know Your Chicken" with abstract, often emotional narrative-style wording in "Apple", "Sugar Water", and "Artichoke", as well as overall pop music fare in "White Pepper Ice Cream", "Theme", and "Le Pain Perdu". Several songs feature the group's well-known references to food, primarily present on this release. Honda explained: "Food is something you can't escape. It's there every day." The band would often go to restaurants after rehearsals, and according to Honda, "Cibo Matto grew out of those restaurant times."

"Theme", unusual among Cibo Matto's discography for its length, is a track which features a relatively normal song sung in English with several Italian words before shifting into instrumental passages and leading into a second half that contains entire verses in Japanese and French.

== Packaging ==
The album booklet contains illustrations and lyrics accompanying most of the songs. The only tracks for which the booklet features no lyrics are "The Candy Man", a cover of a song from the 1971 film Willy Wonka & the Chocolate Factory (presumably for copyright reasons; the song also has all lyrical references to Willy Wonka changed to "the candy man"), and "Jive", an 18-second hidden track primarily consisting of a recording of Miho Hatori tapping her thighs, for which she is also credited.

== Reception and legacy ==
Professional ratings
Review scores
Source	Rating
AllMusic	4.5/5 stars
Entertainment Weekly	A−
The Guardian	4/5 stars
Los Angeles Times	3/4 stars
Pitchfork	9.1/10
Q	4/5 stars
Rolling Stone	3/5 stars
The Rolling Stone Album Guide	4/5 stars
Select	4/5
Spin	9/10

Viva! La Woman was acclaimed by music critics. Michele Romero of Entertainment Weekly described Cibo Matto as "sonic savants who go nutty mixing disparate ingredients, like avant-garde trumpet with bossa nova bass lines and sugary non-sequitur lyrics", summarizing the album as "kitschy club music, as kooky and lovable as Hello Kitty." In The Guardian, Caroline Sullivan called Viva! La Woman "an ambitious confection of trickling beats and delicately comatose spoken vocals whose only hint of wackiness is the lyrics". Select's Andrew Male observed that despite its playful lyrics, the band is "far more musically adept than yer average guitar 'n' shouting comedy act", while Q's Martin Aston highlighted Cibo Matto's eclectic range. AllMusic's Heather Phares found Viva! La Woman, "all trendiness aside", to be "innovative and catchy" and "diverse and entertaining". Sandy Masuo offered qualified praise in the Los Angeles Times, finding that "some of the protracted jams are a bit aimless, but the food theme binds things together"; less impressed was critic Robert Christgau, who gave the album a "neither" grade without comment.

At the end of 1996, Viva! La Woman was listed by Spin as the tenth-best album of the year. It was also voted as the year's 27th-best album in The Village Voice's annual Pazz & Jop critics' poll. The album spent six weeks at number one on CMJ's college radio charts. Some listeners perceived the album as a novelty, "partly because of the cutesy-pie assumptions attached to Asian women in pop and partly because of the band's propensity for writing songs about food", much to Cibo Matto's chagrin.

In 1999, Spin ranked Viva! La Woman as the 90th-best album of the 1990s. Writing for The Quietus in 2014, Joe Sweeney regarded Viva! La Woman as "a food-obsessed avant-rap record that dared to be ridiculous at a time when full-throated earnestness ... was shipping millions." The album has been recognized as influential in the years since its release. Drowned in Sound positively discussed its impact within the history of Shibuya-kei music in a 2018 article. The site's Samuel Rosean credited the album with bringing Western listeners' attention to the sound, deeming it "one of the genre's first big international crossover moments". He praised Viva! as "a masterstroke of progressive electronic sounds" and called Cibo Matto's "abstract" fusion of Shibuya-kei with art pop and trip hop "artful and forward-thinking".

== Track listing ==
All tracks are written by Cibo Matto (Miho Hatori and Yuka Honda), except where noted.

No.	Title	Writer(s)	Length
1.	"Apple"		4:01
2.	"Beef Jerky"		2:28
3.	"Sugar Water"	Cibo Matto; Ennio Morricone	4:29
4.	"White Pepper Ice Cream"		5:10
5.	"Birthday Cake"		3:15
6.	"Know Your Chicken"		4:21
7.	"Theme"		10:49
8.	"The Candy Man"	Leslie Bricusse; Anthony Newley	3:11
9.	"Le Pain Perdu"		3:29
10.	"Artichoke"	Cibo Matto; Kudsi Erguner	6:41
11.	"Jive" (hidden track)		0:18
Total length:			48:12

Sample credits

- "Beef Jerky" contains samples of "Vivre pour vivre", performed by Francis Lai.
- "Sugar Water" contains samples of "Hung Up", performed by Paul Weller; and "Sospesi nel cielo", performed by Ennio Morricone.
- "Theme" contains samples of "Tin Tin Deo", performed by Machito and His Afro-Cuban Jazz Ensemble.
- "Le Pain Perdu" contains samples of "Caravan", performed by Duke Ellington.

== Personnel ==
Credits are adapted from the album's liner notes.

(Where possible, the credits here have been adapted from humorous accreditations in the album's booklet, which are often made to sound sexual or food-related.)

Cibo Matto

- Miho Hatori – vocals ("singing, howling, moaning, sighing"), finger snapping, thigh tapping
- Yuka Honda – keyboards, programming, beach guitar, coughs, finger snapping

Additional musicians

- Dougie Bowne – percussion
- Dave Douglas – trumpet
- Rick Lee – horns
- Jay Rodriguez – saxophone
- Josh Roseman – trombone
- Marc Anthony Thompson – vocal sounds
- Bernie Worrell – organ

Production

- Tchad Blake – production, mixing (also "beneath low end sonics"), recording
- Cibo Matto – production
  - Yuka Honda – additional recording on "White Pepper Ice Cream" and "The Candy Man"
- Mitchell Froom – production, assistance ("heavy duty shepherding")
- Jesse Habkell – assistance
- Mike Lee – assistance at Electric Lady Studios
- Bob Ludwig – mastering
- John Paterno – assistance
- Mike Piersante – assistance

Design

- Lance Acord – basement photograph (on CD tray)
- Dave Aron – back cover photograph
- Miho Hatori – booklet illustrations
- Garland Lyn – design assistance
- Mike Mills – art direction, design
- Thomas Thurnauer – cover illustration

Additional personnel

- Tim Carr – A&R ("and street dancing")
