= Cibo Matto (EP) =

EP by Cibo Matto
- Released: December 14, 1995
- Genre: Rock, trip hop
- Label: El Diablo

Cibo Matto chronology
| Cibo Matto (1995) | Viva! La Woman (1996) |

Professional ratings
Review scores
| Source | Rating |
|---|---|
| AllMusic | 3/5 stars |

Cibo Matto is the debut EP by Cibo Matto released in 1995.

Three tracks from this release were later included in the group's debut full-length album with slightly different arrangements (substantially in the case of "Know Your Chicken") and cleaner, better-produced vocal takes. The EP also features a cover of alternative rock band Soundgarden's 1994 song "Black Hole Sun", which Allmusic describes as "a wonderfully loopy cover... rearranged like a lounge favorite and sung in French".

The final track, the instrumental "Crumbs" would later appear on the group's second EP, 1997's Super Relax.

In Japan the album sold 20,000 copies.

== Track listing ==
1. "Beef Jerky"
2. "Birthday Cake"
3. "Know Your Chicken"
4. "Black Hole Sun" (Soundgarden)
5. "Crumbs"
