= La grande corsa verso Lupionòpolis =

Studio album by Peppe Voltarelli
- Released: 26 May 2023
- Recorded: February 2023
- Studio: EastSide Sound (Manhattan, New York, United States of America)
- Genre: Folk, Song writing, World music
- Length: 35:35
- Label: Visage Music
- Producer: Simone Giuliani

Peppe Voltarelli chronology
Planetario (2021)	La grande corsa verso Lupionòpolis (2023)

Singles from La grande corsa verso Lupionòpolis
- 1. "Nun signu sulu mai" 2. "Au cinema" 3. "Spremuta di limone"

La grande corsa verso Lupionòpolis is the seventh studio album by Italian songwriter Peppe Voltarelli, released by the record label Visage Music on 26 May 2023.

== Background ==
La grande corsa verso Lupionòpolis is Voltarelli's first album since 2021's Planetario, which was awarded the Targa Tenco as best performing album of that year.

The Calabrian songwriter presents a collection of songs recorded in New York by Marc Urselli (three Grammy Awards and collaborations with Nick Cave and Lou Reed) at Manhattan's historic East Side Sound, and artistically produced and arranged by Los Angeles-based Italian producer/keyboard player Simone Giuliani (to his credit, productions with Andrea Bocelli and the London Symphony Orchestra).

The album, which contains ten tracks including eight songs in Calabrian dialect, one in Italian, and an instrumental waltz, was recorded in February 2023 and features musicians of international calibre such as Devin Hoff (double bass), Jake Owen (guitar), Stephane San Juan (drums), Mauro Refosco (percussions), and the participation of Eleanor Norton (cello), Doug Wieselman (saxophone and clarinet), and Amy Denio (vocals).

The record is accompanied by the music video of the song "Nun signu sulu mai", shot in Brooklyn's Red Hook neighbourhood and directed by Giacomo Triglia (Brunori Sas, Lucio Dalla, Måneskin). The song features Seattle-based singer and multi-instrumentalist Amy Denio of The Tiptons Sax Quartet as a guest.

The album entered the five finalists for the Tenco Award 2023 in the category best album in dialect and placed 2nd in the final ranking. In 2024, the album won the City of Loano National Award for Traditional Italian Music as best album of 2023.

== Track listing ==
All songs written by Peppe Voltarelli.

No.	Title	Length
1.	"Mareniro"	4:11
2.	"Nun signu sulu mai"	3:13
3.	"Au cinema"	3:27
4.	"Spremuta di limone"	3:57
5.	"Fiore"	5:18
6.	"Mozza"	2:31
7.	"Bon bon bon"	3:39
8.	"La grande corsa verso Lupionòpolis"	2:44
9.	"Marinari perduti"	3:36
10.	"Carizzi"	2:57
Total length:		35:35

== Formats ==
After being digitally released on 26 May 2023, on 2 August 2023 a special package in physical format was designed and printed by Todo Modo Publishing in cooperation with Visage Music, consisting of a bag containing the CD of the album and a book with the lyrics of the album and ten unpublished tales. Beyond online, the special package is sold at concerts, where a potato from Sila is given as an additional gift.

Album (CD, digital)

- 2023 - La grande corsa verso Lupionòpolis (Visage Music)

== Music videos ==
- 2023 - "Nun signu sulu mai" (directed by Giacomo Triglia)
- 2024 - "Au cinema" (directed by Lele Nucera)
- 2025 - "Spremuta di limone" (directed by Tony Gutierres)
- 2026 - "Mozza" (directed by John Cardiff)

== Personnel ==
- Peppe Voltarelli: vocals (1–7, 9–10)
- Simone Giuliani: piano (1–10)
- Mauro Refosco: percussions (1–10)
- Stephane San Juan: drums (1–10)
- Devin Hoff: double bass (1–10)
- Jake Owen: guitar (1–10)
- Doug Wieselman: saxophone and clarinet (1–10)
- Eleanor Norton: cello (1–10)
- Amy Denio: vocals (2)
- Alexia Bomtempo: vocals (6)
- Francesca Magnani: vocals (6)

== Credits ==
- Lyrics and music by Peppe Voltarelli
- Arranged, mixed, and produced by Simone Giuliani
- Recorded in February 2023 by Marc Urselli at EastSide Sound (Manhattan, New York, United States of America)
- Mastered by Michael Flannery
- Record label: Visage Music
- Catalog number: VM3052
- Artwork: Carolina Cosi
- Photographies: Francesca Magnani (New York) and Danilo Samà (Paris)
- Digital distribution: Pirames International
- Physical distribution: Todo Modo Publishing in cooperation with Visage Music
- Rights society: S.I.A.E. (Società Italiana degli Autori ed Editori)
- ISRC: ITDF92300058/67
