= Super Relax =

EP by Cibo Matto
- Released: January 28, 1997
- Studio: Magic Shop, New York City
- Genre: Rock; trip hop
- Length: 42:54
- Label: Warner Bros.
- Producer: Yuka Honda; Mario Caldato Jr; Mitchell Froom; Tchad Blake

Cibo Matto chronology
Viva! La Woman (1996)	Super Relax (1997)	Stereo Type A (1999)

Professional ratings
Review scores
Source	Rating
AllMusic	4/5 stars
Pitchfork	5.7/10

Super Relax is an EP by Cibo Matto released in 1997. Four of the nine tracks are versions of the song "Sugar Water" from the group's debut album, Viva! La Woman, and "Spoon" would later appear (in a reworked version) on Stereo Type A. Two of the remaining songs are covers, "BBQ" is a live recording, and "Crumbs" originally appeared on the band's first release, a 1995 self-titled EP. Super Relax was also the first release to feature new members Sean Lennon and Timo Ellis.

== Track listing ==
1. "Sugar Water" – 4:30
2. "Sugar Water" (Mike D/Russell Simins/Mario Caldato Jr. Remix) – 4:35
3. "Spoon" – 4:06
4. "BBQ" – 4:57
5. "Águas de Março" ("Waters of March", originally by Antonio Carlos Jobim) – 3:16
6. "Sing This All Together" (originally by the Rolling Stones) – 4:44
7. "Sugar Water" (acoustic) – 6:53
8. "Crumbs" – 3:04
9. "Sugar Water" (Coldcut Remix) – 6:49
