= Smokey & Miho =

- Genres: Bossa Nova, Pop, rock
- Years active: 2001–2003
- Past members: Miho Hatori, Smokey Hormel

Smokey & Miho was a musical group named after lead vocalists Miho Hatori and Smokey Hormel. Hatori collaborated with Hormel after leaving the group Cibo Matto. The group released two EPs and later released a compilation album, The Two EPs, which was composed of the two previously released EPs.

== Band information ==
- Miho Hatori: Vocals
- Smokey Hormel: Guitars, Vocals
- Jon Birdsong: Horns
- Don Falzone: Bass
- Joey Waronker: Drums
- Mauro Refosco: Percussion
- Ganda: Vocals

== Discography ==
=== EPs ===
- Smokey & Miho (2002)
- Tempo De Amor (2002)

=== Compilation ===
- The Two EPs (2003)

(Vinyl re-release on Varèse Sarabande 2017)
