= Smokey Hormel =

American guitarist (born 1959)

- Birth name: Gregory Hormel or Smokey Hormel
- Born: Los Angeles, California, U.S.
- Genres: Americana-, Brazilian-, Caribbean-, and African-styled surf music
- Occupation: Session guitarist
- Website: Official site

Smokey Hormel (born circa 1959) is an American guitarist known for his blues-influenced Americana style and working as a session musician with a wide array of performers.

== Early life ==
Hormel was born and raised in Los Angeles. His given name has been reported as Smokey or Gregory. Hormel is a great-grandson of George A. Hormel, founder of Hormel Foods Corporation. As a teenager he studied with Jimmy Wyble, guitarist for Texas Playboys and Benny Goodman.

== Career ==
In the mid-1980s, Hormel played lead guitar with the Radio Ranch Straight Shooters and later joined the roots-rock band The Blasters, with whom he toured the US and Europe from 1988 to 1992. At the same time, he formed The Blue Shadows with Lester Butler, performing weekly in Hollywood's King King club. Throughout the early 1990s, he toured and recorded with John Doe, the pair appearing in the movie Georgia.

In 1996, Hormel joined Beck for his Odelay world tour and played on the subsequent Beck albums Mutations, Midnight Vultures and Sea Change. Two years later, he played with Tom Waits on the Grammy award-winning Mule Variations and was featured on Waits' Get Behind The Mule tour in 1999.

In 2000, Hormel moved to New York City, where he and Miho Hatori formed Smokey & Miho. In 2003, Forro in the Dark was formed with Rob Curto and Mauro Refosco. The group recorded and performed with David Byrne, Seu Jorge, Bebel Gilberto and Steve Earle. In 2005, Hormel formed Smokey's Secret Family, which plays Brazilian-, Caribbean-, and African-styled surf music; and Smokey's Round-up, a western swing band.

In the early 2000s, Hormel was a primary player on Johnny Cash's final albums, produced by Rick Rubin, which included the Grammy Award-winning cover of Nine Inch Nails' "Hurt".

From 2004 to 2010, Hormel was a composer and guitarist for the Nickelodeon TV cartoon series The Backyardigans. His other film score work includes Be Kind Rewind, The Cowboy and The Frenchman, The Straight Story, Star Maps, Chuck & Buck, Trees Lounge, Lonesome Jim, Old Joy, Wendy and Lucy, Night Moves, Certain Women and I'm Not There.

In 2010, Hormel recorded and toured with Norah Jones. They appeared together in the feature film Ted.

In 2012, he rejoined Beck for a tour and the recording of the 2014 Grammy Award-winning Album of the Year, Morning Phase.

Today Hormel plays clubs around New York City with Smokey's Secret Family. Smokey's Round-up plays dances every Wednesday night at Sunny's Bar in Brooklyn.

He has also recorded or performed with Adele, Lee Allen, R. L. Burnside, Jim Carroll, Rosanne Cash, Cibo Matto, Neil Diamond, Bo Diddley, John Doe, Dixie Chicks, Erasmo Carlos, Steve Earle, Los Fabulosos Cadillacs, Allen Ginsberg, Josh Groban, Marianne Faithfull, Joe Houston, Wanda Jackson, Mick Jagger, David Johansen, K. D. Lang, Al Kooper, Bettye Lavette, Sean Lennon, Chris Martin, The Manhattan Transfer, Patsy Montana, Jennifer Nettles, Beth Orton, Kid Rock, Timothy B Schmit, Joe Strummer, Justin Timberlake, Rufus Wainwright, Yebba and Yo La Tengo.
