= Chicago Music Exchange =

American musical instrument retailer

Coordinates: 41.9421°N 87.6706°W

The Chicago Music Exchange is a music equipment retailer based in Chicago, Illinois, United States. Located at 3316 North Lincoln Avenue, CME is known for its museum-like showroom and collection of vintage guitars and basses. It is a major Chicago destination for musicians.

== History ==
CME was founded in 1990 by Scott Silver who moved the store from 3270 N. Clark St to its current location in 2005. A major player in the global vintage guitar market, Chicago Music Exchange took an active role in vintage guitar boom of the mid to late-2000s.

The business and its inventory of instruments was purchased by David Kalt in 2010 for $7.5 million. Since then, the store has added a full drum shop as well as a dedicated bass room ("The Bassment") which opened in 2013. CME has also rapidly expanded its online presence and sales, and is known for its active YouTube channel featuring product demos of new pedals and vintage pieces.

In June 2012, CME posted a video entitled "100 Riffs" which went viral following a stint on the front page of Reddit.

In 2013, Kalt launched Reverb.com as an open marketplace to buy and sell music gear. In 2019, Reverb.com was sold to Etsy.

== Notable customers ==
Chicago Music Exchange has hosted many celebrity customers including:

- Adele
- Billie Joe Armstrong
- Billy Corgan
- Black Keys
- Bill Kelliher
- Brad Paisley
- Brian Blade
- Butch Walker
- Cage the Elephant
- Camera Obscura
- Carlos Santana
- Dweezil Zappa
- Dawes
- Eddie Vedder
- Ethan Farmer
- Fall Out Boy
- Foxygen
- Gotye
- Imagine Dragons
- J Mascis
- Jeff Tweedy
- Joe Bonamassa
- John Depp
- Karen O
- The Lumineers
- Marcus Mumford
- Mastodon
- Melissa Etheridge
- Metz
- Neon Trees
- Oasis
- Of Monsters & Men
- Omar Rodríguez-López
- OneRepublic
- Red Hot Chili Peppers
- Limp Bizkit
- Rick Nielsen
- Russian Circles
- Sleeping With Sirens
- Social Distortion
- Steve Miller
- Sting
- Tame Impala
- The War on Drugs
- Tom Petty
- Will Champlin
- Zac Brown
