= Evan Bernard =

American music video director

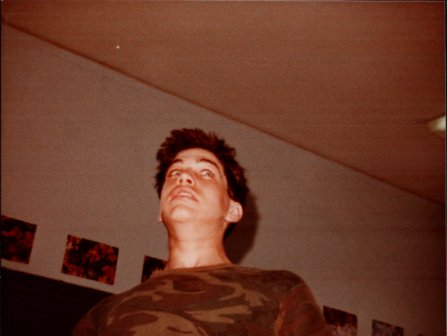
- Bernard in 1983
- Occupation: Director
- Years active: 1995–present

Evan Bernard is an American director of commercials and music videos who has directed videos for artists such as The Chicks, Moby, the Beastie Boys, Green Day, Lit, Cibo Matto and many others.

== Life and career ==
After studying advertising design at Syracuse University and Saint Martin's School of Art and Design in London, Bernard moved to New York and found a job as a "cruise director" on the 1994 Lollapalooza music tour festival. It was there that he first met and befriended the Beastie Boys, who allowed him to direct the video for their song "Root Down'" in 1995. This proved to be a jump-off point for his career, leading immediately to his direction of music videos for other bands, including several acts on the Beastie Boys' own Grand Royal record label. Since then he has continued to direct music videos, but has also branched out into commercials, directing televisions ads for companies like Toyota, Puma and Red Stripe. In 1996, he acted as a cinematographer for the film Free Tibet, a documentary about the first Tibetan Freedom Concert in San Francisco, which was organized by Beastie Boys member Adam Yauch (MCA) in order to raise awareness plight of people in Tibet.

In June 2007, Bernard released Pound, a short, two-minute viral video onto the web to rather successful results. The video depicts two friends who meet on the street and greet each other by engaging in an impressively long and complex handshake and once its completed, say goodbye by starting another minute-long handshake.

Bernard was mentioned in the Beastie Boys top 10 hit "Get It Together" with the lyrics "drive the lane like I was Evan Bernard".

== Partial filmography ==
=== Film ===
- Patriots Day (2016) Yankees Fan
- Pound (2007) - director
- Free Tibet (1998) - cinematographer

=== Commercials ===
- 2K Sports - "Cool Kids"
- 2K Sports - "Iguodala Day"
- 2K Sports - "J in Your Face"
- 2K Sports - "KG Goes Cold"
- 2K Sports - "OBF Soldiers"
- 2K Sports - "Westside"
- Adelphia - "Taco"
- Alltel - "Window"
- Altice - "Soccer Mom Goals"
- Champs - "Flight Crew"
- Chicago Music Exchange - "Encore"
- Chicago Music Exchange - "Expert"
- Chicago Music Exchange - "Love Salad"
- Chicago Music Exchange - "Smash"
- ESPN-WNBA - "5-0"
- ESPN-WNBA - "Moves"
- ESPN-WNBA - "Snack Flips"
- ESPN-WNBA - "Streetball"
- ESPN-WNBA - "Suburbs A"
- Foot Locker - "The Nike 20 Collection"
- Foot Locker - "The Hack"
- Foot Locker - "Weight"
- Hula Hoops - "Football"
- Hula Hoops - "Snog"
- Icehouse - "Jay"
- Icehouse - "Supermodels"
- Kiss - "Stay Sexy"
- Levi's - "Dog Anxiety"
- Mastercard - "Moving"
- Mastercard - "Showdown"
- McDonald's - "Press Conference"
- McDonald's - "Help"
- New Jersey Department of Health - "Break"
- New Jersey Department of Health - "Headstand"
- New Jersey Department of Health - "Mind Bender"
- New Jersey Department of Health - "Simon Says"
- New Jersey Department of Health - "Staring"
- Nike - "Aquarium"
- Nike - "Bars"
- Nike - "Broken Nose"
- Nike - "Crying"
- Nike - "Dawn"
- Nike - "Dominos"
- Nike - "Grandma"
- Nike - "Hot Dog"
- Nike - "NBA James"
- Nike - "Portraits"
- Nike - "Shut Up"
- Nike - "Zone"
- PlayStation - "Every Angle"
- Puma and Foot Locker - "Red Army"
- Prudential - "And So On"
- Prudential - "Last Chance Trendy"
- Reebok - "Undercover Fury"
- Snickers - "The Snickers Write-Off"
- Toyota - "Sasquatch"
- Virgin Radio - "Woof"
- Red Stripe
- X-Large Action Suit

=== Music videos ===
1995

- Beastie Boys - "Root Down" (Version 1)
- Jon Spencer Blues Explosion - "Flavor"
- Ruth Ruth - "Uninvited"

1996

- Cibo Matto - "Know Your Chicken"
- Enormous - "Sweet Is"
- Fun Lovin' Criminals - "Scooby Snacks"
- Jon Spencer Blues Explosion - "2 Kindsa Love"
- Lustre - "Kalifornia"
- Butter 08 - "Butter of '69"

1997

- The Lemonheads - "The Outdoor Type"
- Violent Femmes - "Blister in the Sun"
- OMC - "I Love L.A."
- Rancid - "The Harder They Come (live)"
- Bis - "Tell It to the Kids"
- Buffalo Daughter - "Great Five Lakes"

1998

- Money Mark - "Hand in Your Head"
- Money Mark - "Maybe I'm Dead"
- Josh Wink featuring The Interpreters - "Simple Man"
- BTK - '"Peppyrock"
- Les Rythmes Digitales - "(Hey You) What's That Sound?"
- Jon Spencer Blues Explosion - "Talk About the Blues"
- Ozomatli - "Cut Chemist Suite"
- New Radicals - "You Get What You Give"

1999

- Green Day - "Nice Guys Finish Last"
- Harvey Danger - "Save It for Later"
- Dangerman - "Let's Make a Deal"
- Ben Folds Five - "Army"
- Cassius - "Feeling for You"
- Dixie Chicks - "Ready to Run"
- Basement Jaxx - "Rendez-Vu"

2000

- Harvey Danger - "Sad Sweetheart of the Rodeo"
- Lit - "Miserable"
- Dixie Chicks - "Goodbye Earl"
- Dynamite Hack - "Boyz in the Hood"
- Soulwax - "Much Against Everyone's Advice"
- Bad Religion - "New America"
- Green Day - "Minority"
- Robbie Williams and Queen - "We Are the Champions"
- Tarsha Vega - "Be Ya Self"
- Titán - "Corazon" (Version 2)

2001

- Scapegoat Wax - "Aisle 10 (Hello Allison)"
- Slayer - "Bloodline"

2002

- Greenwheel - "Breathe"
- Tahiti 80 - "1000 Times"
- The Mighty Mighty Bosstones - "You Gotta Go"
- Kelly Osbourne - "Shut Up"

2003

- Gob - "Give Up the Grudge"
- Triumph the Insult Comic Dog - "I Keed"
- Transplants - "D.J. D.J."
- Rancid featuring Rob Aston - "Red Hot Moon"

2004

- Darren Hayes - "Popular"

2005

- Soulwax - "E Talking"
- Moby - "Lift Me Up" (version 1)
- Ben Lee - "Catch My Disease"

2006

- Moby featuring Debbie Harry - "New York, New York"

2007

- Jenny Owen Youngs - "Hot in Herre"

2008

- Born Ruffians - "I Need a Life"
- Moby - "Disco Lies"

2010

- 3OH!3 - "Double Vision"
- Jared Evan - "In Love with You"

2011

- Moby - "The Day"

2021

- The Mighty Mighty Bosstones - "The Killing of Georgie (Part III)"
