= Yuka Honda =

Japanese-American musician

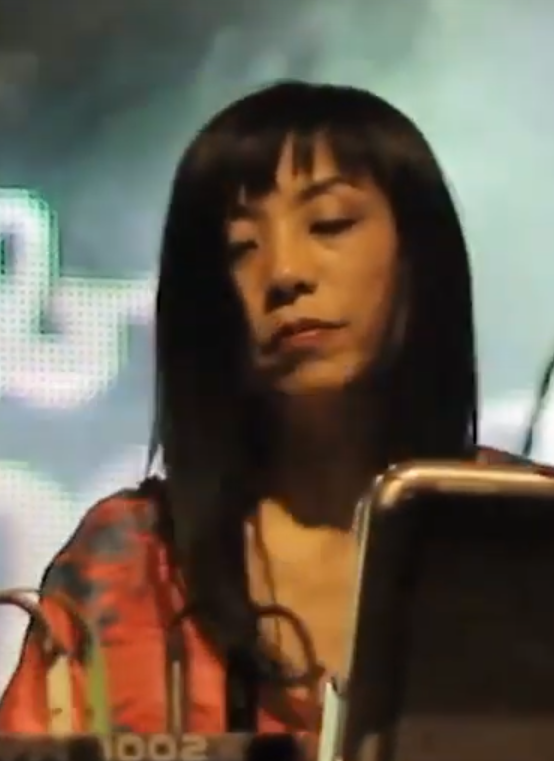
- Honda performing with Cibo Matto in Argentina in 2014

Background information
- Born: 本田ゆか (Honda Yuka); Tokyo, Japan
- Genres: Electronic music; experimental
- Occupations: Musician; record producer; composer
- Instruments: Keyboards; sampler; guitar; bass; vocals
- Years active: 1987–present
- Label: Tzadik Records
- Formerly of: Cibo Matto; Plastic Ono Band; Dopo Yume; Butter 08

Yuka Honda (本田ゆか, Honda Yuka) is a Japanese musician who resides in New York City. She is a multi-instrumentalist (mainly piano, synthesizer, sampler and other keyboards), composer, record producer, and co-founder of the band Cibo Matto. Throughout her career, she has collaborated with a diverse array of musicians, including Petra Haden, Sean Lennon, Mike Watt, Nels Cline, Tricky, Harper Simon, Beastie Boys, Los Lobos, Brooklyn Funk Essentials, Mitchell Froom, Medeski Martin & Wood, Marc Ribot, Yoshimi P-We, Arto Lindsay, Edie Brickell, Vincent Gallo, Luscious Jackson, Dave Douglas, Bernie Worrell, and Caetano Veloso.

== Early life and education ==
Honda was born in Tokyo, Japan and spent a few years of her childhood in Germany and Denmark. She went to school in Aix-en-Provence, France, then moved to New York City in November 1986. She had some classical music training as a child, but never thought about becoming a musician. When she came to New York, she was writing for a Japanese food magazine.

== Career ==
In 1988 she hit her first stage at CBGB's as a keyboard player with Greg Cohen and Michael Blair. In 1989, she started the band "The Flaming Hoops" with boyfriend Dougie Bowne (who she also married), E.J. Rodriguez, and Erik Sanko. They recorded a self-titled album, on which she played a duet with Michael Brecker. In 1990 she joined Jazz Passengers in their musical play "Jazz Passengers in Egypt", and she appeared on their live album, Live at The Knitting Factory. She also joined a live hip-hop band, "Rhythm Method", then a funk band, Brooklyn Funk Essentials, but her main focus was the band she started with husband Dougie Bowne and Marc Anthony Thompson, called Hope Is a Muscle. In 1992, she played Queen Elizabeth Hall in South Bank, London, supporting Arto Lindsay along with Marc Ribot, Bernie Worrell, and Brian Eno.

In 1993 Honda met Miho Hatori while working with the band Leitoh Lychee. The two formed their own band, Cibo Matto, in March 1994. The unique formation of the band in which Hatori was the singer who sang all the songs in relation to food and love, and Honda was the only instrumentalist where she played live electronics and made the sound of a full band, generated a quick sensation in the city, and they signed the record deal with Warner Brothers before the year was over. In 1995, they recorded their debut album Viva! La Woman with Mitchell Froom and Tchad Blake. That year they met Russell Simins when they opened for Blues Explosion, and started the band Butter 08 with Mike Mills, Evan Bernard, and Rick Lee. Honda produced their self-titled album with Simins. Both Cibo Matto and Butter 08 released their albums in 1996.

She was in a romantic relationship with Sean Lennon from 1996 to 2000 and produced his 1998 album Into the Sun. The two met when Honda remixed Yoko Ono's song "Talking to the Universe" (from the album Rising), along with Thurston Moore, Tricky, Beastie Boys and Ween. Cibo Matto invited Lennon and Timo Ellis to join the band as they started to tour frequently. From 1996 to 2000, Honda toured extensively with all three of these projects.

Also in 1996, Cibo Matto worked with the film director Michel Gondry on their single "Sugar Water", a highly artistic music video in the form of a visual palindrome.

Cibo Matto broke up in the year 2001. Honda's work since then seems to be concentrated more in the downtown New York scene, working with musicians such as Dave Douglas, Susie Ibarra, Vincent Gallo, Trevor Dunn, Jim O'Rourke, and John Zorn, for whose label Tzadik Honda recorded her two solo albums. In 2003, Honda collaborated with Boredoms drummer Yoshimi P-We, under the name Yoshimi and Yuka.

In 2005, Honda worked for Hal Willner at Expo 2005 for the 3D animation which was directed by Robert Wilson. She also sang on the Dopo Yume album The Secret Show.

In 2006 Honda played keyboards on Sean Lennon's album Friendly Fire and acted as musical director for the supporting tour.

In 2007 she co-produced Irina Lazareanu with Sean Lennon. She also wrote songs and recorded with Edie Brickell on her new album The Heavy Circles.

In 2009 she worked on Yoko Ono's Between My Head and the Sky as assistant producer. She is also credited with mixing the album with Yoko and Sean, and with "Pro-Tools Editing, sampler, e. piano, organ percussion."

In late 2009 and early 2010 she performed as a member of the reformed Plastic Ono Band including concerts in Tokyo and New York, and also appeared as a member of the group The Ghost of a Saber Tooth Tiger. She also performed improvisational shows with Mike Watt and Nels Cline in the groups Floored by Four and Brother's Sister's Daughter. During this period she became romantically involved with, and subsequently engaged to, Cline. They married in Japan in November 2010.

In 2011, following an eight-year collaboration with Petra Haden, she produced and performed on the album "Salt on Sea Glass" as a member of If By Yes, a group also consisting of Yuko Araki on drums and Hirotaka "Shimmy" Shimizu on guitar, with contributions from David Byrne and Nels Cline.

Since 2011 Honda has re-collaborated with Hatori for new Cibo Matto material, to culminate in 2014 with the release of the group's first album in 15 years, Hotel Valentine.

== Personal life ==
Honda lives in New York with her husband, musician Nels Cline.

== Discography ==
- Memories Are My Only Witness (2002)
- Eucademix (2004)
- Heart Chamber Phantoms (2010)

w/ Yoshimi P-We

- Flower with No Color (2003)

w/ If By Yes

- Salt on Sea Glass (2011)

w/ Nels Cline

- Macroscope (Mack Avenue, 2014)
- Lovers (Blue Note, 2016)

w/ Dave Douglas

- Sanctuary (Avant, 1997)

w/ Huntsville

- Bow Shoulder (Hubro/Grappa Musikkforlag AS, 2020)

w/ Mike Watt

- Floored by Four (Chimera Music, 2010)

=== Producer ===
- Butter 08, Butter (1996)
- Cibo Matto, Super Relax (1997)
- Sean Lennon, Into the Sun (1998)
- Cibo Matto, Stereo ★ Type A (1999)
- Maki Nomiya (of Pizzicato Five), "Star Struck" on Miss Maki Nomiya Sings (2000)
- Miu Sakamoto, "Beautiful" (2000)
- Martha Wainwright, Come Home to Mama (2012)

=== Remix ===
- Yoko Ono, "Talking to the Universe", Rising Mixes (1996)
- Medeski Martin & Wood, "Sugar Craft", Combustication Remix EP (1999)
- HALCALI, "TANDEM-Mutable Chromosome Remix", "Tandem" single (2003)
