= Cibo Matto =

Japanese-American band

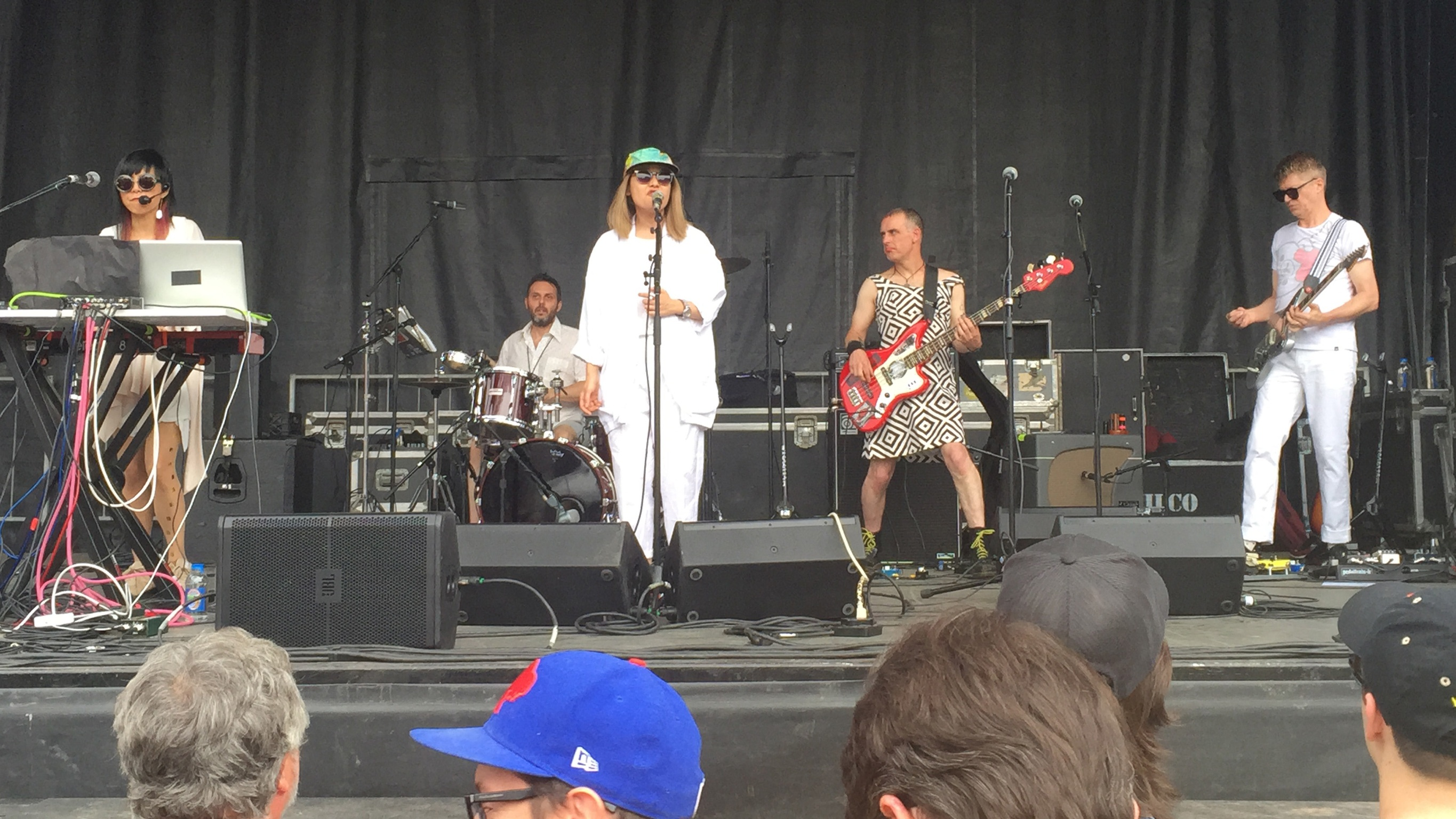
- Cibo Matto performing at the Solid Sound Festival in North Adams, Massachusetts in 2015

Background information
- Origin: New York City, U.S.
- Genres: Trip hop; alternative rock; art pop; shibuya-kei; hip-pop
- Years active: 1994–2002, 2011–2017
- Labels: Chimera Music; Commmons; Warner Bros.
- Past members: Yuka Honda; Miho Hatori; Yuko Araki; Sean Lennon; Timo Ellis; Duma Love

Cibo Matto (pronounced [ˈtʃiːbo ˈmatto]; Italian for 'crazy food') was a Japanese-American band formed by Yuka Honda and Miho Hatori in New York City in 1994. Their first album, Viva! La Woman (1996), had lyrics primarily concerned with food. For their second album, Stereo Type A (1999), they expanded into broader subject matter and recruited Sean Lennon, Timo Ellis, and Duma Love.

Honda and Hatori are Japanese expatriates. Their first album sold 40,000 copies in Japan, but was more successful in the U.S., with over 74,000 copies sold. Over time, their following in Japan grew, which resulted in their signing to Japanese record label Commmons in 2014.

After an almost decade-long hiatus, Honda and Hatori reunited in 2011, playing a series of concerts and recording new material. They released their third and final studio album, Hotel Valentine, in 2014. It reached number 168 on the Billboard 200. Cibo Matto announced their split in December 2017.

== History ==
=== Viva! La Woman: 1994–1996 ===
After working together in the noise rock band Leitoh Lychee, Miho Hatori and Yuka Honda formed Cibo Matto in 1994 with Honda as the instrumentalist and Hatori as the vocalist (although occasionally Honda sang and Hatori contributed instrumentally). In 1995, Cibo Matto released a self titled EP on El Diablo Records. The EP caught the attention of Warner Bros. Records, which signed Cibo Matto later in the year. Through Warner Bros., the duo released its first major album, Viva! La Woman. Cibo Matto is an Italian phrase that translates to "Crazy Food" and many of the tracks from Viva! La Woman, which was produced by Mitchell Froom, featured lyrics related to food, including "Know Your Chicken", "Apple", and "Birthday Cake". The album's first single, "Sugar Water", was a modest college radio and dance hit. The song was accompanied by an innovative split screen music video that was directed by Michel Gondry, where each side showed the same footage—one side going forward, and one backward, meeting mid-song. After the music videos for "Know Your Chicken" and "Sugar Water" enjoyed success on MTV, Cibo Matto made appearances on various television shows such as Oddville, Viva Variety, and Buffy the Vampire Slayer. "Birthday Cake" was heavily featured in the video game Jet Set Radio Future. In 1996, Cibo Matto contributed "Águas De Março (Waters of March)" to the AIDS benefit album Silencio=Muerte: Red Hot + Latin, which was produced by the Red Hot Organization.

=== Stereo Type A: 1997–2001 ===
In 1997, Cibo Matto released a new EP entitled Super Relax, which would complete the line-up by introducing new members Sean Lennon and Timo Ellis with Duma Love joining soon thereafter. In 1998, Lennon released his debut solo album Into the Sun, which featured Hatori ("Into the Sun", "Sean's Theme") and Ellis ("Mystery Juice", "Home", "Spaceship"). Into the Sun was produced and inspired by Honda (whom Lennon was dating at the time). Honda, Hatori, Ellis and Love appeared in the closing scene of the video for Lennon's single "Home". Cibo Matto went on to release its second album Stereo Type A in 1999. Although it was a departure from the familiar sound of Viva! La Woman, Stereo Type A was well received by music critics. That year the band performed with Luscious Jackson at The Opera House in Toronto.

=== Hiatus: 2002–2010 ===
Cibo Matto continued to play live and tour until disbanding in 2002. Honda said: "We felt the need to move to the next step. It was a healthy decision, though it was sad at the same time. Things just need to grow out of things sometimes." All of the members of Cibo Matto went on to release solo material. A compilation entitled Pom Pom: The Essential Cibo Matto was released in 2007.

=== Reunion and Hotel Valentine: 2011–2017 ===
Cibo Matto announced their reunion on March 18, 2011, in advance of the benefit concert for victims of the 2011 Tōhoku earthquake and tsunami. The concert, which took place on March 27 at Columbia University in New York City, also included Yoko Ono, John Zorn, Sonic Youth, and Mike Patton. Following the success of this show, a second was added, this time featuring the Plastic Ono Band and Patti Smith along with Cibo Matto.

The group appeared at the Hollywood Bowl on June 26, 2011, for another benefit, alongside Yellow Magic Orchestra.

On May 16, 2011, Cibo Matto announced its US reunion tour titled "Yeah, Basically Cibo Matto" with a tour website and promotional video. During the shows, the band reportedly spoke about a new studio album that was to be released in 2012. On July 17, 2012, the band announced it would be opening for Wilco at one of its shows. The band included Yuko Araki on drums during this time.

On June 15, 2013, the band played the Meltdown Festival in London and announced that its new album would be released in 2014. While the performance also featured Yoko Ono on "Know Your Chicken", the group also played new songs titled "MFN", "Check In", and "Tenth Floor Ghost Girl". On December 11, Pitchfork reported that Hotel Valentine would be released on February 14, 2014 (Valentine's Day), and that Cibo Matto had shared its music video for "MFN". Hotel Valentine peaked at number 168 on the Billboard 200.

In 2014, the band signed with Japanese label Commmons. This new relationship resulted in several live dates in Japan including Summer Sonic Festival 2014 and shows at Blue Note Jazz Club Nagoya and Blue Note Jazz Club Tokyo.

In September 2014, Cibo Matto released a teaser video announcing their Fall Flavor Tour and a new music video. Rioux opened for multiple US shows. Nels Cline (of Wilco) also performed with the group on tour. The music video for "Déjà Vu" was released on September 18, 2014 in collaboration with New York City-based director Jean Claude Billmaier and creative house Marabigo. Pitchfork identified the video as "a colorful, datamosh-y new video", and Spin as a "stylish bubblegum pop-meets-digital-disaster (intentional)".

Cibo Matto completed two small tours in 2015; an "Avocado Tour" of Japan and a "Banana Split Tour" across the eastern US and Canada. On December 11, 2017, Cibo Matto announced their breakup, explaining that this was a "necessary and positive change".

== Band members ==
- Yuka Honda: sampler, sequencer, keyboards, piano, organ, synthesizer, harpsichord, backing vocals (1994–2002, 2011–2017)
- Miho Hatori: lead vocals, percussion, acoustic guitar (1994–2002, 2011–2017)
- Sean Lennon: bass guitar, electric and acoustic guitars, drums, percussion, synthesizer, backing vocals (1997–2002)
- Timo Ellis: drums, percussion, bass guitar, electric and acoustic guitars, backing vocals (1997–2002)
- Duma Love: percussion, vocals, turntable, beat box (1997–2002)
- Yuko Araki: drums, backing vocals (2011–2017)

== Grand Royal involvement ==
Although Cibo Matto was represented by Warner Bros. Records, they were also considered to be a major part of the Grand Royal Records family.

- Under Grand Royal, Honda and Hatori formed side-project band Butter 08 (1996) with Russell Simins, Rick Lee and Mike Mills.
- Hatori collaborated with the Beastie Boys (who founded Grand Royal) on their 1998 album, Hello Nasty.
- Sean Lennon released his debut album, Into the Sun (1998) on Grand Royal (which featured Honda, Hatori and Ellis).
- Yumiko Ōno of Buffalo Daughter (a former Grand Royal band) contributed moog synthesizer and backing vocals to Stereo-Type A (1999).
- In 2000, Grand Royal released a compilation album titled At Home with the Groove Box in which Lennon contributed the song "Winged Elephants", while Honda and Hatori contributed the song "We Love Our Lawyers". The compilation also featured artists such as Beck and Sonic Youth.
- In 2002, despite Grand Royal's recent "official" disbandment, the Grand Royal team was bought onto to provide additional soundtrack work on Jet Set Radio Future. A number of Grand Royal-associated acts were included on the soundtrack, including Cibo Matto's "Birthday Cake".

== Discography ==
=== Studio albums ===
- Viva! La Woman (1996)
- Stereo Type A (1999)
- Hotel Valentine (2014)

=== Compilations ===
- Pom Pom: The Essential Cibo Matto (2007)

=== EPs ===
- Cibo Matto (1995)
- Super Relax (1997)

=== Singles ===
- "Birthday Cake" 7" (1995)
- "Know Your Chicken" 7" (1996)
- "Working for Vacation" (1999)
- "Moonchild" (1999)
- "Spoon" (1999)

=== Music videos ===
- "Know Your Chicken" directed by Evan Bernard (1996)
- "Sugar Water" directed by Michel Gondry (1996)
- "MFN" directed by Georgia (2013)
- "Déjà Vu" directed by Jean Claude Billmaier (2014)

== In popular culture ==
The band's name appears in the lyrics of the Le Tigre song "Hot Topic".

They also appear in the second season of Buffy the Vampire Slayer episode "When She Was Bad", to play a concert in the fictional Sunnydale nightclub, the Bronze.

Their song "Birthday Cake" appears on the 1996 soundtrack Kids in the Hall: Brain Candy and in the 2002 video game Jet Set Radio Future.
