= Timo Ellis =

American musician

- Born: Timothy K. Ellis
- Genres: Rock; electronic; punk; metal; avant garde
- Occupation: Musician
- Instruments: Guitar; bass; drums; keyboards; ukulele; vocals
- Website: Official website Netherlands band

Timothy Kneeland "Timo" Ellis is a multi-instrumentalist and record producer from New York City, and is frontman vocalist for the band Netherlands.

In 1997 Ellis and Sean Lennon joined Cibo Matto. As a quartet (Yuka Honda, Miho Hatori, Ellis, Lennon) Cibo Matto released an EP, Super Relax (1997) and their second album Stereo ★ Type A (1999). In 2001, Ellis released his first solo EP, The Enchanted Forest of Timo Ellis.

== With Netherlands ==
- Fantasmatic
- Silicon Vapor
- Audubon
- Hope Porn
- Black Gaia
- Green Lips And Lightning (previously unreleased B-sides)
- Zombie Techno
- Zombie Techno (Undead)
- Kali Corvette
- Severance
