= Ween discography =

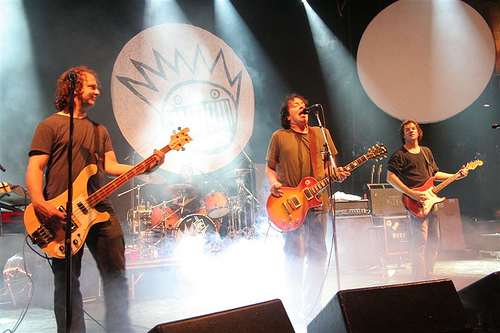
- Ween performing in Edmonton, Alberta
- Studio albums: 9
- EPs: 8
- Live albums: 7
- Compilation albums: 5
- Singles: 26
- Video albums: 1
- Music videos: 10
- Demo tapes: 15

The following is the discography of Ween, a Pennsylvania-based experimental alternative band formed by childhood friends Aaron Freeman and Mickey Melchiondo, better known by their respective stage names, Gene Ween and Dean Ween. Starting out with a few locally released demo tapes, including The Crucial Squeegie Lip, AXIS: Bold as Boognish, and The Live Brain Wedgie / WAD Excerpts, the band was picked up by independent label Twin/Tone Records in 1990 and released their debut GodWeenSatan: The Oneness. In 1991 they signed with another independent label, Shimmy-Disc, and released The Pod. Later, Ween signed with Elektra Records and released their major label debut Pure Guava in 1992. It features their highest-charting single to date, "Push th' Little Daisies". While touring for this album, they played at Chapel Hill, North Carolina, which would later be released as a CD/DVD live album in 2008 titled At the Cat's Cradle, 1992.

In 1994 Chocolate and Cheese was released, which spawned the singles "Voodoo Lady", "Freedom of '76", and "I Can't Put My Finger on It". Ween's next album, released in 1996, was titled 12 Golden Country Greats and was recorded with several prominent Nashville musicians, featuring a distinct country sound. It gave way to the singles "Piss Up a Rope" and "You Were the Fool". The nautically themed album The Mollusk followed in 1997. It is considered a prog rock concept album, and featured the singles "Mutilated Lips" and "Ocean Man", the latter gaining a significant following after being a song on the SpongeBob SquarePants Movie soundtrack. The band's desire to pursue alternate forms of media led to the MP3-only release Craters of the Sac, presented by Melchiondo for online download and free trade. The same year the band had planned to release a live album compilation spanning their entire career up to that point, titled Paintin' the Town Brown: Ween Live 1990-1998. However, according to Melchiondo, once the album was completed, Elektra realized the sales potential of the CD and denied Ween the right to release it through their independent label. Ween's sixth studio album, White Pepper, was the band's final studio release for Elektra and was released in 2000. The pop-themed, Lennon-McCartney-inspired album produced two singles: "Even If You Don't", which was made into a music video directed by Trey Parker and Matt Stone, and "Stay Forever".

Ween formed their own label in 2001, Chocodog Records, the label Ween originally planned to release Paintin' the Town Brown on. Later, Ween released the first official Chocodog album, Live in Toronto, Canada. The limited-pressing CD, available exclusively through the band website, became an instant collector's item. Subsequent Chocodog releases were produced in higher volumes to meet demand. Ween signed to Sanctuary Records and released Quebec, their first studio release in three years, in 2003. Later that year, the band held a poll on their official message boards to select songs for the band to play on their forthcoming live-in-studio album All Request Live. Released on November 22, the album would be the first time Ween would play all five parts of "The Stallion" (Parts 1 & 2 from The Pod, Part 3 from Pure Guava, the unreleased Part 4, and Part 5 from Craters of the Sac). The performance also included rarely-played early Ween tracks such as "Pollo Asado", "Mononucleosis" and "Cover it with Gas and Set it in Fire", as well as Ween's rejected Pizza Hut jingle, "Where'd the Cheese Go?". In 2004, Ween released Live in Chicago, a DVD and CD set that compiled tracks from two live performances from the Quebec tour at Chicago's Vic Theatre in November 2003.

In 2005, Ween hit the studio to record better quality versions of previously unreleased songs for the compilation Shinola, Vol. 1. The twelve tracks were all, according to Melchiondo, "songs we regretted not putting on other records". The tracks spanned the band's career, from "Tastes Good on th' Bun", a Pod outtake, to "Someday", a Quebec outtake. Different versions of three of the songs, "Big Fat Fuck", "How High Can You Fly?" and "Monique the Freak" had previously appeared on Craters of the Sac.

In 2006, Ween rented an old farmhouse and converted it into a working studio. After writing over 50 songs and recording rough versions through 2006, they picked through them and, with Andrew Weiss as producer, re-recorded album versions for what would become The Friends EP and the full-length La Cucaracha which were both released in 2007 on Rounder Records. La Cucaracha, which would prove to be Ween's final album, would later be called a "big piece of shit" by Freeman, adding, "I think the songs on it were good, or a bunch of songs, but overall that was a big clue Mickey and I were finito".

In 2011, Melchiondo quietly released an MP3-only collection of songs called The Caesar Demos, named after the band's original working title for Quebec, to friends on his Facebook page. In his comment, he stated the songs were all recorded between 2001 and 2003 while Claude Coleman was recovering from injuries sustained in a car accident, and that many of the tracks featured only himself and Freeman. In addition to a handful of tracks that eventually made Quebec, Caesar Demos would also feature several previously unreleased tracks.

The band broke up in 2012, after Freeman commented in a Rolling Stone interview that it was time to pursue solo projects. The manager for the band, Greg Frey, later confirmed he had decided to 'end his musical relationship' with Ween. Melchiondo was unaware of this until it was public information. In 2015, Freeman began using the Gene Ween moniker again for live performances, and later that year they announced their first shows in years for 2016. A sequel to Shinola Vol. 1 was confirmed to be in the works by Melchiondo on Facebook in 2016. A live album containing a 2001 performance of every song from their first album was released in 2016, entitled GodWeenSatan Live.

On October 6, 2026, Shinola, Vol. 2 was announced for a November 27 release date.

== Studio albums ==
Year	Title	Label	Peak chart positions		
Year	Title	Label	US	US Heat.	AUS
1990	GodWeenSatan: The Oneness	Twin/Tone	—	—	—
1991	The Pod	Shimmy Disc	—	—	—
1992	Pure Guava	Elektra	—	—	93
1994	Chocolate and Cheese	Elektra	—	10	80
1996	12 Golden Country Greats	Elektra	—	23	72
1997	The Mollusk	Elektra	159	5	69
2000	White Pepper	Elektra	121	2	165
2003	Quebec	Sanctuary	81	—	190
2007	La Cucaracha	Rounder/Schnitzel	69	—	84

== Live albums ==
Year	Title	Label	Peak chart positions
Year	Title	Label	US Heat.
1999	Paintin' the Town Brown: Ween Live 1990–1998	Elektra	37
2001	Live in Toronto Canada	Chocodog/Schnitzel	—
2002	Live at Stubb's 7/2000	Chocodog	—
2003	All Request Live	Chocodog	—
2004	Live in Chicago	Sanctuary	—
2008	At the Cat's Cradle, 1992	Chocodog/Schnitzel	—
2016	GodWeenSatan Live	Chocodog/Schnitzel	—
2026	Bring Out the Foos: Live 1996	Rhino	—
2026	Europe "90"	Rhino	—
2026	Boognish Provides	Rhino	—

== Compilation albums ==
Year	Title	Label	Notes
1999	Craters of the Sac	Self-released	Released for free on the Internet
2005	Shinola, Vol. 1	Chocodog	Compilation of remastered outtakes
2018	Bananas and Blow	Warner	Unauthorized release
2026	Europe "90"	Rhino	Released on Record Store Day 2026, features studio sessions and a live show recorded in Switzerland in the winter of 1990/1991
2026	Shinola, Vol. 2	Rhino	Black Friday Record Store Day 2026 compilation of outtakes, B-sides and rarities.

== Box Sets ==
Year	Title	Label	Notes
2009	1996 - 2000	Plain Recordings	Vinyl boxset containing 12 Golden Country Greats, The Mollusk, and White Pepper
2026	Brown Box	Rhino	CD boxset containing GodWeenSatan: The Oneness, The Pod, Pure Guava, Chocolate and Cheese, 12 Golden Country Greats, The Mollusk, White Pepper, Quebec, Shinola, Vol. 1, and La Cucaracha
2026	Boognish Provides	Rhino	14 CD set highlighting 7 shows from the Chocolate and Cheese tour from 1994 to 1995. A separate 2 LP set was released, featuring selected tracks from all the shows featured on the CD box set.

== EPs ==
=== Studio EPs ===
Title	EP details
The Friends EP	Released: June 19th 2007; Label: Chocodog; Format: 12" vinyl, CD

=== Compilation EPs ===
Title	EP details
Transdermal EP	Released: Sep 1, 2003; Label: Sanctuary; Format: CD
Golden Wastes EP	Released: August 13th 2026; Label: Elektra; Format: Digital download

=== Single EPs ===
Year	Title	Label
1992	Sky Cruiser EP	White
1994	I Can't Put My Finger On It EP	Elektra
1994	Freedom of '76 EP	Flying Nun
1994	Voodoo Lady EP	Flying Nun
1996	Piss Up a Rope/You Were the Fool EP	Flying Nun
2000	Stay Forever Promo EP	Mushroom
2000	Stay Forever Red Vinyl EP	Mushroom

== Singles ==
Year	Title	US Alt.	AUS	UK	Album
1993	"Push th' Little Daisies"	21	18	—	Pure Guava
1993	"Sky Cruiser"	—	139	—	Non album single
1994	"I'm Fat"	—	—	—	Non album single
1994	"I Can't Put My Finger on It"	—	—	—	Chocolate and Cheese
1994	"Freedom of '76'"	—	123	152	Chocolate and Cheese
1994	"Voodoo Lady"	32	58	97	Chocolate and Cheese
1996	"Piss Up a Rope"	—	—	116	12 Golden Country Greats
1996	"You Were the Fool"	—	—	98	12 Golden Country Greats
1997	"Mutilated Lips"	—	—	—	The Mollusk
1997	"Ocean Man"	—	—	—	The Mollusk
2000	"Even If You Don't"	—	—	135	White Pepper
2000	"Stay Forever"	—	—	138	White Pepper
2003	"Tried and True" / "Mountains and Buffalo"	—	—	—	Quebec
2003	"Transdermal Celebration"	—	—	—	Quebec
2005	"Monique the Freak"	—	—	—	Shinola, Vol. 1
2005	"Gabrielle"	—	—	—	Shinola, Vol. 1
2005	"Dirty Money"	—	—	—	Non album single
2007	"Your Party"	—	—	—	La Cucaracha
2007	"Learnin' To Love"	—	—	—	La Cucaracha
2010	"DC Won't Do You No Good"	—	—	—	Non album single
2024	"Junkie Boy"	—	—	—	Chocolate and Cheese (Deluxe Edition)
2024	"Voodoo Lady (Demo)"	—	—	—	Chocolate and Cheese (Deluxe Edition)
2026	"Bad Day in Brownsville"	—	—	—	12 Golden Country Greats (Deluxe Edition)
2026	"Boston Chicken"	—	—	—	12 Golden Country Greats (Deluxe Edition)
2026	"So Long Jerry"	—	—	—	12 Golden Country Greats (Deluxe Edition)
2026	"Help Me Scrape the Mucus Off My Brain (2026 Remaster)"	—	—	—	12 Golden Country Greats (Deluxe Edition)
2026	"Vallejo (Live at the 40 Watt Club, Athens, GA, 2/10/1995)"	—	—	—	Boognish Provides
2026	"The Wolfman"	—	—	—	Non album single

== Music videos ==
Year	Song	Director
1991	"Pollo Asado"	Mark Kramer
1991	"Captain Fantasy"	Mark Kramer
1991	"Pork Roll Egg and Cheese"	Mark Kramer
1993	"Push th' Little Daisies"	Adam Bernstein
1994	"Freedom of '76"	Spike Jonze
1994	"I Can't Put My Finger on It"	Chris Applebaum
1994	"Voodoo Lady"	Roman Coppola
2000	"Even If You Don't"	Trey Parker & Matt Stone
2003	"Roses Are Free" (Note: Unofficial Video created for Super Midnight Movie Show.)	Rob Schrab
2003	"Transdermal Celebration"	Adam Phillips
2026	"Bad Day in Brownsville"	Unknown

== Early independent releases ==
Year	Title	Label	Notes
1984	Mrs. Slack	Yucassettes	EP, partially lost
1985	Mrs. Slack	Yucassettes	EP, partially lost
1985	Chris Hoecke	Yucassettes	EP, partially lost
1985	Mike Banks	Yucassettes	EP, partially lost
1985	Kim Tulio	Yucassettes	EP, partially lost
1985	John Ward	Yucassettes	EP, partially lost
1986	Erica Peterson's Flaming Crib Death	Yucassettes	
1986	Fred & Edgar	Yucassettes	Joint cassette between Ween and Smersh, side one is the Ween side which features the song "Fred" and side two is the Smersh side which features the song "Edgar"
1986	We Broke Up		Lost
1987	The Crucial Squeegie Lip	Bird o’ Pray	
1988	Ween II (Axis: Bold as Boognish)	Bird o’ Pray	
1988	The Live Brain Wedgie! / Wad Excerpts	Bird o’ Pray	12" EP, side A is taken from a live show in Trenton, New Jersey, while side B consists of tracks taken from the Wad demo tapes.
1988	Prime 5	Bird o’ Pray	Compilation of songs originally released on Yucassettes

=== Notable demo tapes ===
Year	Title
1988	Ween WAD – (Series of GodWeenSatan: The Oneness demos, various tapes exist with different tracklists)
1988	The Scraping the Palm for Guava Tape – (Unofficially released, GodWeenSatan: The Oneness era)
1989	The Focus Tape – (Unofficially released, GodWeenSatan: The Oneness era)
1990	The Pork Roll Egg & Cheese on a Kaiser Bun Tape – (Unreleased, The Pod era)
1990	Eindhoven EP – (Only song that has surfaced from this tape is "Albino Sunburn Girl", later released as part of Europe "90" compilation in 2026, The Pod era)
1990	The Stallion – (Unofficially released, The Pod era)
1990	Big Timmy Wasserman – (Unofficially released, The Pod era)
1990	Bilboa – (Unofficially released, The Pod era)
1991	Springstuff – (Unreleased, Pure Guava era)
1991	Caprice Classic – (Unofficially released, Pure Guava era)
1991	Eravis – (Unofficially released, Pure Guava era)
1992	Freedom – (Unreleased, Chocolate & Cheese era)
1992	Chocolate & Cheese Taster Demos – (Unofficially released, Chocolate & Cheese era)
1993	Crème de Menthe – (Unreleased, Chocolate & Cheese era)
1994	Chocolate & Cheese Tape – (Unreleased, Chocolate & Cheese era)
1994	12 Golden Country Greats 4-Track Demos – (Unofficially Released, 12 Golden Country Greats era)
1995	The Mollusk Sessions – (Streamed on the Ween Myspace page in 2007)
1996	Music For Drunk Irish Homos – (Unreleased, The Mollusk era)
1997	White Pepper Demos – (Unofficially released)
1997–1998	Jug Is Quaid – (Unreleased compilation of studio material compiled by the band. Some songs speculated to be included in the tape are "Albino Sunburn Girl", "Did You See Me" (Demo), "Koko" (Demo), "I Still Love You", and "Flutes of Chi" (Demo))
1999	Pandy Fackler Tape – (Unofficially released, compiled by Dean Ween from different Chocolate & Cheese era demo tapes)
2000	Long Beach Island – (Unofficially released, White Pepper era)
2001–2003	Caesar Demos – (Released by Dean Ween on his Facebook page in 2011, Quebec era)
2006–2007	La Cucaracha Demos & Sessions – (Various songs recorded around the La Cucaracha era)
2013	Boognish Rising: Christmas 2013 Sampler – (Compiled by ChrisB featuring various Pre-1994 Ween songs)
2014	Boognish Rising: Thanksgiving 2014 Sampler – (Compiled by ChrisB featuring various Pre-1994 Ween songs)
2016	Boognish Rising: Summer 2016 Sampler – (Compiled by ChrisB featuring various Pre-1994 Ween songs)

== Other appearances ==
Year	Title	Label
1987	Various - Third Beat From The Sun	Birdo'pray Records
1992	Gwar - The Road Behind EP	Metal Blade Records
1993	En Esch - Cheesy	TVT Records
1993	Freedom of '76: The Jane Pratt Show	Lifetime Entertainment
1994	Frente! - Lonely	Mushroom Records
1994	A Merry Little Christmas : A Holiday Sampler from Elektra & EastWest	Elektra/EastWest
1995	Kostars - Klassics With a K	Grand Royal
1995	Used & Recorded by 3RRR Vol.2	Radio Release
1996	Beautiful Girls	Miramax / Elektra
1996	Ben Vaughn - Instrumental Stylings	Bar None Records
1996	Z-Rock Hawaii	Nipp Guitar
1996	Yoko Ono-Rising Mixes	Capitol Records
1996	Schoolhouse Rock! Rocks	Atlantic Records
1998	Hub - Hub	SLASH RECORDS
1998	Chef Aid: The South Park Album	Columbia
1998	The X-Files: The Album	WEA
2002	Run Ronnie Run soundtrack	New Line Productions Inc.
2002	Morvern Callar	Warp Records
2004	The SpongeBob SquarePants Movie – Music from the Movie and More...	Sire/London/Rhino
2004	Tony Hawk's Underground 2 soundtrack	Activision/Neversoft
2005	Murderball soundtrack	Commotion Records
2008	Weeds: Music from the Original Series, Volume 3	N/A
