= At the Cat's Cradle, 1992 =

Live album by Ween
- Released: November 25, 2008
- Recorded: December 9, 1992
- Venue: Cat's Cradle
- Genre: Alternative rock
- Length: 77:07 (Live CD); 49:39 (Live DVD)
- Label: Chocodog

Ween chronology
La Cucaracha (2007)	At the Cat's Cradle, 1992 (2008)	GodWeenSatan Live (2016)

Professional ratings
Review scores
Source	Rating
AllMusic	3.5/5 stars

At the Cat's Cradle, 1992 is the sixth live album by the American rock band Ween. It was released on November 25, 2008, on Chocodog Records.

The 2-disc package includes a CD containing a live performance from December 9, 1992, at the Cat's Cradle in Chapel Hill, North Carolina. The bonus DVD contains live footage from three shows of The Pod tour.

== Track listing (CD) ==
All tracks written by Ween.

No.	Title	Length
1.	"Big Jilm"	3:36
2.	"Never Squeal"	2:59
3.	"Captain Fantasy"	4:38
4.	"Tick"	2:24
5.	"Pork Roll Egg and Cheese"	3:25
6.	"Cover It with Gas and Set It on Fire"	2:10
7.	"The Goin' Gets Tough from the Getgo"	2:55
8.	"Don't Get 2 Close (2 My Fantasy)"	5:12
9.	"Nan"	3:43
10.	"Marble Tulip Juicy Tree"	6:02
11.	"Ode to Rene"	2:47
12.	"Mango Woman"	3:11
13.	"El Camino"	2:57
14.	"Demon Sweat"	5:07
15.	"You Fucked Up"	2:14
16.	"Old Queen Cole"	2:08
17.	"Papa Zit"	1:39
18.	"Buckingham Green"	7:47
19.	"Birthday Boy"	2:25
20.	"Fat Lenny"	3:10
21.	"Reggaejunkiejew"	6:26
Total length:		1:17:00

== Track listing (DVD) ==
All tracks are written by Ween, except "Listen to the Music" by Tom Johnston, and "Mountain Dew" by Bascom Lamar Lunsford and Scotty Wiseman. All clips filmed at Vera, Groningen, Netherlands on October 31, 1991, except where noted.

No.	Title	Recorded	Length
1.	"Captain Fantasy"		4:36
2.	"You Fucked Up"		1:38
3.	"Tick"		1:48
4.	"Boing"		2:04
5.	"Listen to the Music"	Trenton, New Jersey, 1/8/1992	1:27
6.	"Don't Get 2 Close (2 My Fantasy)"	Staches, Columbus, Ohio, 3/6/1992	3:56
7.	"Cover It with Gas and Set It on Fire"		2:18
8.	"Seconds"		2:03
9.	"Marble Tulip Juicy Tree"	Staches, Columbus, Ohio, 3/6/1992	5:25
10.	"Gladiola Heartbreaker"		2:04
11.	"Common Bitch"	Staches, Columbus, Ohio, 3/6/1992	1:59
12.	"The Goin' Gets Tough from the Getgo"	Groningen, Netherlands, 10/31/1991 (With clips from 1/8/1992)	2:24
13.	"Reggaejunkiejew"	Staches, Columbus, Ohio, 3/6/1992	6:18
14.	"Old Queen Cole"		1:49
15.	"Shalom Absalom"	Trenton, New Jersey, 1/8/1992	1:50
16.	"Don't Laugh (I Love You)"		1:41
17.	"Mountain Dew"		6:11
Total length:			44:31

== Personnel ==
- Dean Ween – lead guitar, Backing vocals
- Gene Ween– lead vocal, Acoustic guitar

Technical

- Aaron Tanner – art direction, design
