= All Request Live =

Live album by Ween
- Released: November 22, 2003
- Recorded: July 22, 2003
- Genre: Rock
- Length: 1:05:20
- Label: Chocodog
- Producer: Ween

Ween chronology
Quebec (2003)	All Request Live (2003)	Live in Chicago (2004)

Professional ratings
Review scores
Source	Rating
Pitchfork	7.7/10

All Request Live is the fourth live album by the American rock band Ween, and the third to be released on their home record label Chocodog Records. The performance was webcast on July 22, 2003 and released on November 22, 2003. A Pitchfork Media review calls it "unquestionably the brownest live Ween of them all."

All Request Live features tracks performed live as part of a web radio broadcast, playing songs selected by fans on the band's message board. Among the tracks performed are all three officially released parts of "The Stallion" (along with the previously unreleased part four, and part five, from Craters of the Sac), fan favorites "Awesome Sound" and "Demon Sweat", a slightly expanded version of the drug-addled skit "Pollo Asado", and a nearly six-minute-long take on the band's rejected Pizza Hut jingle, "Where'd the Cheese Go?"

== Track listing ==
All tracks written by Ween.

No.	Title	Length
1.	"Happy Colored Marbles"	5:12
2.	"The Stallion, Pt. 1"	2:56
3.	"The Stallion, Pt. 2"	4:24
4.	"The Stallion, Pt. 3"	3:25
5.	"The Stallion, Pt. 4"	3:19
6.	"The Stallion, Pt. 5"	3:36
7.	"Demon Sweat"	4:10
8.	"Cover It with Gas and Set It on Fire"	2:05
9.	"Awesome Sound"	5:03
10.	"Cold Blows the Wind"	4:39
11.	"Pollo Asado"	3:14
12.	"Reggaejunkiejew"	5:53
13.	"Tried and True"	4:34
14.	"Mononucleosis"	3:19
15.	"Stay Forever"	3:35
16.	"Where'd the Cheese Go?"	5:47
Total length:		1:05:11

== Personnel ==
Dean Ween - lead guitar, vocals

Gene Ween - vocals, rhythm guitar

Claud Coleman Jr. - Drums, Percussion, vocals

Dave Dreiwitz - Bass guitar, vocals

Glenn McClelland - Keyboards, Synthesizers; Cowbell (track 8)
