= GodWeenSatan Live =

Album by Ween

Live album by Ween
- Released: November 18, 2016
- Recorded: September 14, 2001
- Genre: Alternative rock
- Length: 77:46
- Label: Chocodog
- Producer: Tom Ruff

Ween chronology
At the Cat's Cradle, 1992 (2008)	GodWeenSatan Live (2016)	Bananas and Blow (2018)

Professional ratings
Review scores
Source	Rating
Allmusic	4/5 stars

GodWeenSatan Live is Ween's seventh live album. It was released on November 18, 2016 on Chocodog Records.

This album is a 2-disc chronicling of a performance from September 14, 2001 in which Ween played their first album, "GodWeenSatan: The Oneness", in its entirety, for its 11th (advertised as 25th) anniversary re-release. The show almost did not happen due to the 9/11 terrorist attacks that had taken place three days prior. It was performed at John & Peters, in New Hope, Pennsylvania, where founding members Gene and Dean Ween are from.

== Track listing ==
All tracks are written by Ween, except "L.M.L.Y.P.," which contains a partial cover of "Shockadelica" and elements of "Alphabet St." by Prince and “El Camino” which contains a partial cover of “White Rabbit” by Jefferson Airplane.

Disc one
No.	Title	Length
1.	"You Fucked Up"	1:38
2.	"Tick"	2:22
3.	"I'm in the Mood to Move"	1:33
4.	"I Gots a Weasel"	1:32
5.	"Fat Lenny"	3:06
6.	"Cold and Wet"	1:45
7.	"Bumblebee"	1:41
8.	"Don't Laugh (I Love You)"	2:18
9.	"Never Squeal"	3:08
10.	"Up on the Hill"	1:12
11.	"Wayne's Pet Youngin'"	2:04
12.	"Nicole"	8:05
13.	"Common Bitch"	2:34
14.	"El Camino"	2:26
15.	"Old Queen Cole"	1:50
Total length:		37:14

Disc two
No.	Title	Length
1.	"Nan"	3:01
2.	"Licking the Palm for Guava"	1:37
3.	"Mushroom Festival in Hell"	3:02
4.	"L.M.L.Y.P."	10:19
5.	"Papa Zit"	1:16
6.	"Old Man Thunder"	0:39
7.	"Birthday Boy"	3:04
8.	"Blackjack"	4:16
9.	"Squelch the Weasel"	3:00
10.	"Marble Tulip Juicy Tree"	7:36
11.	"Puffy Cloud"	2:42
Total length:		40:32

== Personnel ==
Ween

- Claude Coleman Jr. – drums
- Dave Dreiwitz – bass
- Gene Ween – vocals, acoustic guitar (on: 14, & 21–26)
- Dean Ween – electric guitar (Ext: 21 & 26), vocals
- Andrew Weiss – bass, keyboards, sound effects

Production

- Kirk Miller – live sound engineer
- Tom Ruff – recording, mixing, mastering
- Lindsay Brown – management
- Patrick Jordan – management
- Brad Sands – management
- Aaron Tanner – art direction, design
- Jeff Rusnak – photography
