= Quebec (album) =

Studio album by Ween
- Released: August 5, 2003
- Recorded: 2001–2003
- Studios: Zion House of Flesh, Hopewell, New Jersey
- Genres: Neo-psychedelia; art rock; alternative rock; psychedelic rock
- Length: 55:07
- Label: Sanctuary
- Producer: Andrew Weiss

Ween chronology
| Live at Stubb's (2002) | Quebec (2003) | All Request Live (2003) |

Singles from Quebec
- 1. "Tried and True/Mountains and Buffalo" Released: August 2003; 2. "Transdermal Celebration" Released: December 2003

Quebec is the eighth studio album by the American rock band Ween, released on August 5, 2003, on Sanctuary Records. It was the first album released after the band's contract with Elektra expired, and marked its return to independent labels.

Recorded during a period of strife in the band members' personal lives, Quebec was described by Dean Ween as a "very negative" album that takes on a darker tone compared to the band's prior work. Josh Freese filled in for drummer Claude Coleman Jr., who was recovering from a life-threatening car accident, on the album. Freese also played with the band on tour during this time, including at a series of benefit concerts for Coleman at New York City's Bowery Ballroom on October 7 and 8, 2002.

The album cover was heavily inspired by the packaging for the game Thorns from the 3M Paper Games series.

== Background ==
The album was the band's first record since 1991's The Pod to be released on an independent label, as Ween's contract with Elektra Records expired following 2000's White Pepper. The three-year gap between albums was the longest for the band up to this point.

The album was originally titled Caesar. According to Dean Ween, the title Quebec was chosen to evoke a "rainy, colder than Paris, Parisian place. The vibe of our record is like romantic and rainy without being as classy as Paris. That was why we called it Quebec, it's like this B-version of Leonard Cohen."

Dean Ween recorded the guitar solo on "Transdermal Celebration" illicitly using Carlos Santana's guitar and amplifier at a storage space where it was to be shipped to New York. After being informed by a roadie, he took a hard disk recorder with him and successfully recorded it in ten minutes without getting caught.

== Themes ==
The recording of Quebec saw the band deal with many struggles in their professional and personal lives. Gene Ween was in the process of divorcing his first wife, Dean Ween was dealing with drug issues and "partying way too hard", Claude Coleman Jr. was recovering from a life-threatening car crash in 2002 that left him unable to perform on the record (with drumming instead being primarily handled by Josh Freese), and the band had been dropped by Elektra Records.

As a result, many of the songs on the album deal with drug abuse, mental health issues, and failing relationships. Gene Ween has admitted to taking inspiration from his divorce, saying to PopMatters: “I wrote most of these songs right before the end. A lot of these songs are about that. Even if it’s not direct, you can feel the beginning of the end of the breakup in these songs.”. Dean Ween reflected in 2007 that "With Quebec, I like it as a record, but it's very negative. It's one of our darker records, I think. I don't listen to any of our records, but I have never listened to that one."

== Reception ==
Professional ratings
Aggregate scores
| Source | Rating |
|---|---|
| Metacritic | 71/100 |
Review scores
| Source | Rating |
| AllMusic | 3.5/5 stars |
| The Austin Chronicle | 3.5/5 stars |
| Mojo | 4/5 stars |
| Mondo Sonoro | 8/10 |
| Now | 3/5 stars |
| OndaRock | 7.5/10 |
| Pitchfork | 7.7/10 |
| The Rolling Stone Album Guide | 3/5 stars |
| Tiny Mix Tapes | 4.5/5 stars |
| Uncut | 4/5 stars |

The album received generally positive reviews from music critics. Critic Mark Prindle named Quebec the best album of the 2000s in an interview on Red Eye w/ Greg Gutfeld. Mojo named it the No. 39 best album of 2003. CMJ named it the No. 8 best album of 2003.

== Track listing ==
All tracks written by Ween.

Quebec
| No. | Title | Length |
|---|---|---|
| 1. | "It's Gonna Be a Long Night" | 2:48 |
| 2. | "Zoloft" | 3:51 |
| 3. | "Transdermal Celebration" | 3:25 |
| 4. | "Among His Tribe" | 3:37 |
| 5. | "So Many People in the Neighborhood" | 3:28 |
| 6. | "Tried and True" | 4:01 |
| 7. | "Happy Colored Marbles" | 3:12 |
| 8. | "Hey There Fancypants" | 1:59 |
| 9. | "Captain" | 3:58 |
| 10. | "Chocolate Town" | 3:16 |
| 11. | "I Don't Want It" | 3:25 |
| 12. | "The Fucked Jam" (instrumental) | 2:53 |
| 13. | "Alcan Road" | 5:10 |
| 14. | "The Argus" | 4:51 |
| 15. | "If You Could Save Yourself (You'd Save Us All)" | 4:44 |
| Total length: | | 55:07 |

Japan bonus track
| No. | Title | Length |
|---|---|---|
| 16. | "Ooh Vah La" | 2:59 |
| Total length: | | 58:18 |

== Soundtrack appearances and covers ==
"Tried and True" and "Transdermal Celebration" appeared in the second season of Superman & Lois with the former being featured in the sixth episode of the same name.

Devin Townsend covered "Transdermal Celebration" for his album Transcendence in 2016.

Water from Your Eyes covered "If You Could Save Yourself (You'd Save Us All)" in 2024.

== The Caesar Demos ==
On August 11, 2011, Dean Ween quietly released a two-disc, MP3-only collection of songs, The Caesar Demos, named after the band's original working title for Quebec, to friends on his Facebook page. In his comment, he stated the songs were all recorded between 2001 and 2003 while drummer Claude Coleman, Jr. was recovering from injuries sustained in a car accident, and that many of the tracks featured only himself and Gene. In addition to a handful of recordings that eventually made the album, the demos feature several alternate takes as well as a number of songs that have remained unreleased.

well what can i say about this here, lemme see. the first thing that comes to mind is that all the while we were doing this we still had claude coleman on drums, he eventually got into a major car wreck and wasn't around when it finally came time to make the "real" record. instead the drum duties fell on me, josh freese, and sim cain for a couple of tunes. almost all of this was recorded at our beach house in holgate, nj onto 16 track tape. a tiny bit of it was recorded in the garage behind aaron's house in pt. pleasant, pa. some of it was recorded in the spare bedroom of my house in new hope. most of the tunes are just me and aaron, with the two of us playing everything, with me on drums. the songs with claude, dave, and glenn are pretty obvious. on just a few tunes we took what you hear here and cleaned them up and had andrew weiss mix them for the record after some overdubs. dave sings on "it's gonna be a long night", this was days before he had surgery to remove polyps in his throat and his voice was really rough so we figured he was the guy for the job. This isn't even all of the tunes that we ended up choosing from, just the ones i happened to burn to cd before we drove home from the beach every week. hope you dig it for what it is.

A few of the songs on the Caesar Demos would end up on later records by the band. "Someday" and "I Fell In Love Today" would later be featured on the 2005 compilation Shinola, Vol. 1, while a reworked version of "Don't Let The Moon Catch You Crying" would appear on Dean Ween's 2018 solo album rock2.

Disc 1
| No. | Title | Length |
|---|---|---|
| 1. | "Chocolate Town" | 2:49 |
| 2. | "Pot Luck" | 2:27 |
| 3. | "Ooh Vah Lah" | 2:49 |
| 4. | "So Many People in the Neighborhood" | 2:26 |
| 5. | "Linda (the Sexy Dancer)" | 2:52 |
| 6. | "That Man (from the Flatland)" | 4:57 |
| 7. | "Happy Colored Marbles" | 2:39 |
| 8. | "Hey There Fancypants" | 2:08 |
| 9. | "If You Could Save Yourself (You'd Save Us All)" | 5:44 |
| 10. | "It's Gonna Be a Long Night" | 2:46 |
| 11. | "Oh My Little Country Cottage" | 1:36 |
| 12. | "Among His Tribe" | 2:46 |
| 13. | "Transdermal Celebration" | 3:23 |
| 14. | "Captain" | 4:18 |
| 15. | "Tried and True" | 4:24 |
| 16. | "I Fell in Love Today" | 3:40 |
| Total length: | | 51:44 |

Disc 2
| No. | Title | Length |
|---|---|---|
| 1. | "I Don't Want It" | 3:57 |
| 2. | "Ambrosia Parsley" | 4:36 |
| 3. | "Zoloft" | 2:32 |
| 4. | "Love Come Down (9-11-01)" | 5:42 |
| 5. | "Alcan Road" | 3:35 |
| 6. | "Don't Let the Moon Catch You Cryin'" | 3:30 |
| 7. | "You Can Go Shit in Your Hat (Matt)" | 2:20 |
| 8. | "Someday" | 3:34 |
| 9. | "She Caught My Fancy" | 3:01 |
| 10. | "Eulogy for David Anderson" | 3:08 |
| 11. | "Things You Already Know" | 3:52 |
| 12. | "Hello Johnny" | 3:55 |
| 13. | "I'm Wide Open" | 5:16 |
| Total length: | | 48:58 |

== Personnel ==
=== Ween ===
- Gene Ween – vocals (all ext. 1, 12), bass guitar (tracks 2, 9, 10), keyboards (tracks 2, 5, 7, 13), acoustic guitar, synthesizers (track 4), drum machine (track 5), guitar (tracks 7, 9, 10, 13, 14), Omnichord (track 2, 8, 9)
- Dean Ween – vocals (track 1), electric guitar (all ext. 9), bass guitar (tracks 1, 3–8, 13–15), keyboards (track 2), electric sitar (tracks 3, 6), vocoder (track 5), drums (tracks 5, 11)
- Glenn McClelland – organ (tracks 1, 15), piano (tracks 14, 15), accordion (track 15), keyboards (tracks 3, 10, 14)
- Dave Dreiwitz – bass guitar, vocals (track 10)

=== Additional Personnel ===
- Andrew Weiss – synthesizers, strings (tracks 9, 15), percussion, fretless bass (track 2), drums (track 6), keyboards (tracks 2, 3, 6, 11)
- Sim Cain – drums (track 1)
- Josh Freese – drums (tracks 3, 7, 9, 10, 13–15)

=== Production ===
- Ween – arranger
- Andrew Weiss – producer, arranger, mixing
- Christopher Shaw – mixing
- Ted Young – mixing assistant
- Howie Weinberg – mastering

== Charts ==
| Chart (2003) | Peak position |
|---|---|
| Australian Albums (ARIA) | 190 |
| US Billboard 200 | 81 |
| Chart (2026) | Peak position |
| Belgian Albums (Ultratop Flanders) | 130 |
