= Synthetic Socks =

Studio album by Gene Ween
- Released: July 30, 1987
- Genre: Lo-fi
- Length: 58:50
- Label: TeenBeat Records
- Producers: Scott Lowe and Gene Ween

Synthetic Socks is an album by American musician Aaron Freeman (a.k.a. Gene Ween), released on TeenBeat Records in 1987. It is almost entirely the product of Freeman making personal recordings in his bedroom. Freeman sent two cassettes of material to TeenBeat over six months. Freeman and Mark Robinson later went through the tapes and selected songs from them that would later appear on the album. The cover of the album is a close up of a child (possibly Freeman himself) holding a frog. Alternate versions of the cover crop the image so only the frog and the child's hand can be seen.

== Production and history ==
Instruments include Synsonic Drums, Korg Poly-800, piano, and reel-to-reel. Long time friend of Freeman, Scott Lowe, assisted in post production using delay and additional keyboards.

Credited as Synthetic Sox (not "Socks" as in the album title), three of the TeenBeat tracks; Tree, Sea of Mellichis and Investigating Tornadoes, were released on vinyl as part of Shadow Mouth: Compilation One, released on the Shadow Mouth Record label based in Asbury Park, New Jersey.

"I Wanna Lick It/Can I Speak To Mark With Electricity?" features the 1975 Kiss hit "Rock and Roll All Nite" in its entirety, which also briefly appears in "Justcruisin'". This is due to Freeman recording the album on old cassettes with music already on the tape. This effect is also heard on the Ween song "Birthday Boy", which features a small section of Pink Floyd's song "Echoes" near the end. Other examples of this effect happening in Ween's discography are on "I Play It Off Legit" and "Flies On My Dick".

Synthetic Socks features a very embryonic version of Ween's trademark sound. Freeman's later bandmate, Michael Melchiondo (a.k.a. Dean Ween), appears a few times on the cassette.

== Track listing ==
No.	Title	Length
1.	"Baked Potatoe" (sic)	1:13
2.	"Cops"	3:56
3.	"Hence It Came" (instrumental)	0:49
4.	"Let's Live Together"	0:14
5.	"Once I Lived"	3:40
6.	"Anything Quickly" (instrumental)	1:26
7.	"Get Out Of Here Son"	1:22
8.	"GI"	0:26
9.	"Ho Ho Ho"	2:46
10.	"Some Weird Shit"	1:15
11.	"Europhyoosh"	3:19
12.	"Tree" (instrumental)	3:12
13.	"Love"	2:49
14.	"Justcrusin'"	2:39
15.	"I Hate Snuggles"	1:34
16.	"Style of Carpet" (instrumental)	0:40
17.	"Collectives"	0:35
18.	"Cheese Fries"	1:34
19.	"Weenstock"	0:43
20.	"So Pink"	0:59
21.	"Sea of Mellchis"	1:31
22.	"Investigation Tornadoes"	2:16
23.	"Today It Is My Birthday"	1:54
24.	"Sonata in A#G Overture" (instrumental)	2:51
25.	"Happy Family"	2:26
26.	"School Days"	2:34
27.	"I Wanna Lick It/Can I Speak To Mark With Electricity"	10:07
Total length:		58:50
