= Regressive Aid =

American instrumental band

Regressive Aid was an American instrumental band consisting of Simeon Cain (drums), William Tucker (guitar), and Andrew Weiss (bass guitar). Regressive Aid frequently played at City Gardens, a punk rock club in Trenton, New Jersey.

The band later would become Scornflakes, ultimately the same lineup with the addition of a vocalist (Boy White) and a shift into a sound centered on punk, rather than the jazzy-rock dissonance common in songs by Regressive Aid. Following their termination, all of the members of Regressive Aid would become longtime collaborators in the band Ween.

The members of Regressive Aid were featured as characters in the Matt Howarth comic book The Anti-Chair (1983), the title taken from one of the band's songs. The band also received a plug in Howarth's graphic novel WRAB: Pirate Television. Cain and Weiss also played in Gone, a three pieced punk instrumental rock outfit, as well as the Rollins Band, while Tucker went on to perform with Ministry in 1989. Tucker and Weiss also spent time performing with the supergroup, Pigface.

== Discography ==
- Why Settle For Less When You Can Regress EP (Rhesus Records, 1981)
- Effects on Exposed People LP (Rhesus Records, 1983)
