= Shinola, Vol. 1 =

Compilation album by Ween
- Released: 19 July 2005
- Recorded: 1990–2005
- Length: 47:34
- Label: Chocodog
- Producer: Andrew Weiss

Ween chronology
Live in Chicago (2004)	Shinola, Vol. 1 (2005)	The Friends EP (2007)

Singles from Shinola, Vol. 1
- 1. "Monique the Freak" Released: 2005; 2. "Gabrielle" Released: 2005

Professional ratings
Review scores
Source	Rating
AllMusic	4.5/5 stars
Pitchfork	7.6/10
Tiny Mix Tapes	3.5/5 stars

Shinola, Vol. 1 is the first rarities compilation album by the American rock band Ween. Released by Chocodog on July 19, 2005, Shinola is a collection of remastered outtakes dating back to 1990.

The album gets its title from the colloquial phrase "You don't know shit from Shinola". A follow-up, Shinola, Vol. 2, was announced on October 6, 2026 and will be released on November 27.

== Track origins ==
- "Tastes Good on th' Bun" is an outtake from The Pod, appearing on The Stallion Tape.
- "Boys Club" was the first Ween song recorded with Glenn McClelland, who joined the group in 1996.
- "I Fell In Love Today" appears on The Caesar Demos digital album of Quebec outtakes, recorded between 2001–2003. It had never been performed live until September 9, 2023.
- "Big Fat Fuck" was released on the 1999 Craters of the Sac digital album.
- "Gabrielle" appears on the Chocolate and Cheese Sessions bootleg.
- "Did You See Me" appears on The Mollusk Sessions tape streamed on the band's MySpace page.
- "How High Can You Fly?" was released on the 1999 Craters of the Sac digital album.
- "Transitions" has no confirmed origin but is theorized by fans to be a Mollusk outtake.
- "Israel" is not found on any circulating demo tapes, and no discussion or writing on it by the band or otherwise has linked it to any specific era.
- "The Rift" appears on the Chocolate and Cheese (1992 Taster Demos) tape.
- "Monique The Freak" was released on the 1999 Craters of the Sac digital album.
- "Someday" appears on The Caesar Demos digital album of Quebec outtakes, recorded between 2001 and 2003.

=== Craters of the Sac differences ===
"Big Fat Fuck," "How High Can You Fly?," & "Monique The Freak" are all changed compared to their Craters of the Sac releases. "How High Can You Fly" is 54 seconds longer, and "Big Fat Fuck" and "Monique the Freak" were significantly cut down for Shinola, with the former having 4:12 cut and the latter having 4:28.

== Track listing ==
All tracks written by Ween.

Shinola, Vol. 1
No.	Title	Originally recorded	Length
1.	"Tastes Good on th' Bun"	Jan–Oct 1990	3:26
2.	"Boys Club"	1996	3:06
3.	"I Fell in Love Today"	2001–2003	4:09
4.	"Big Fat Fuck"	1998–1999	2:55
5.	"Gabrielle"	1994	3:29
6.	"Did You See Me?"	1996	5:11
7.	"How High Can You Fly"	1998–1999	2:39
8.	"Transitions"	Unknown	3:45
9.	"Israel"	Unknown	3:40
10.	"The Rift"	1992	5:41
11.	"Monique the Freak"	1998–1999	5:48
12.	"Someday"	2001–2003	3:45
Total length:			47:34

== Personnel ==
- Produced/mixed by Andrew Weiss and Ween.
- Written and performed by Dean and Gene Ween.
- Art direction, design by Aaron Tanner.
- Mastered by Emily Lazar.
