= Andrew Weiss (musician) =

American bassist and record producer

Andrew Weiss is an American musician, composer, audio engineer and record producer.

== Life and career ==
Born in Chicago, Weiss spent most of his youth growing up in central New Jersey where he later started playing bass with local bands while attending Princeton High School. In 1982 he teamed up with William Tucker (guitar) and high school buddy Sim Cain (drums) to form Regressive Aid, an instrumental new wave band that released a 4-song EP in 1983 and a 6-song LP the following year. Around this time, Weiss began his experimentations with electronic music and recording. This led to a collaboration with his friend Jeff Rusnack, partnersinWonder, and together they founded Bird'o'Pray Records, a cassette only label that featured electronic and alternative music, including the first releases by the New Hope, Pennsylvania duo Ween.

In 1985, Regressive Aid caught the attention of Black Flag founder/guitarist Greg Ginn who then recruited Weiss and Sim to travel to Los Angeles and form Gone, an instrumental punk/jazz power trio. In 1986 Gone recorded 3 albums for SST Records and played over 500 gigs throughout the USA touring in support of Black Flag as well as performing guerrilla type shows in record stores. The end of the year saw the demise of both Gone and Black Flag, at which point Weiss and Sim teamed up with Black Flag vocalist Henry Rollins and Washington DC guitarist Chris Haskett to form the Rollins Band. It was also around this time that Weiss began to further pursue adventures in music production and engineering, enlisting Ween and local NJ act Skunk as guinea pigs. In 1989, he produced and engineered albums for both bands which were subsequently snatched up by the Minneapolis indie label Twin Tone. Soon thereafter, he also produced a duo project with Rollins for Chrysalis Records, dubbed Wartime, on which Weiss wrote, played, and recorded all the music himself while Henry wrote the lyrics and performed the vocals.

From 1987 through 1992, Weiss toured the world and recorded 7 albums with the Rollins Band acting not only as their bassist, but writing much of the music as well. During this period he also produced four albums for Ween, two for Skunk, and participated in 3 tours and 4 albums as bassist and songwriter for the industrial all-star supergroup Pigface. In 1992, Weiss departed the Rollins Band to devote more time to Ween (as their live bassist) and Pigface projects. The years since have found him recording and playing bass with, among others, the Butthole Surfers, Chris Harford and Yoko Ono (with whom he did a world tour in 1996), while continuing his production/engineering work with Ween (six more releases), a collaboration with the premier Japanese band Boredoms (Z-Rock Hawaii), the 'P' album (featuring Johnny Depp, Gibby Haynes, Flea, Steve Jones, & others), Yoko Ono, and Akron/Family.

Weiss has also been a producer and engineer of albums for a number of Central and South American bands including six albums with Babasónicos from Argentina, four with Mexican band Liquits, and the Grammy winning 2003 album from Café Tacvba Cuatro Caminos. In 2000, Weiss started spending time in Haiti recording and performing with Port-au-Prince post-racine band RAM. Around this time he also began composing music for television and film, most notably scoring music for a multitude of shows on the Sundance Channel. Weiss' most recent work was being the bassist with Jello Biafra and the Guantanamo School of Medicine. Weiss is still maintaining his Zion House'o'Flesh studio in New Jersey.

== Partial discography ==
Year	Album	Artist	Role
1987	Life Time	Rollins Band	bass
1988	Do It	Rollins Band	bass
1989	Hard Volume	Rollins Band	bass
1990	Turned On	Rollins Band	bass
1990	GodWeenSatan: The Oneness	Ween	producer, engineer, mixer, bass
1991	The Pod	Ween	producer, engineer, mixer
1992	Pure Guava	Ween	producer, engineer, mixer
1992	The End of Silence	Rollins Band	bass
1994	Electriclarryland	Butthole Surfers	bass
1994	Chocolate & Cheese	Ween	producer, engineer, mixer, bass, keyboards
1995	P	P	producer, bass, mellotron
1996	Planet Ultra	Urban Dance Squad	mixing, vocal producer
1996	Z-Rock Hawaii	Z-Rock Hawaii	Producer, mixer, Recorder, Bass, Keyboard
1996	Dopádromo	Babasónicos	producer, mixer
1997	Babasónica	Babasónicos	producer, mixer
1997	The Mollusk	Ween	producer, engineer, mixer, bass, keyboards
1999	Paintin' the Town Brown: Ween Live 1990–1998	Ween	bass
1999	Miami	Babasónicos	mixer
2001	Jessico	Babasónicos	producer, recording engineer, mixing
2003	Quebec	Ween	producer, engineer, mixer, keyboards, bass
2003	Infame	Babasónicos	producer, mixing
2003	Cuatro Caminos	Café Tacuba	associate producer and engineer
2005	Anoche	Babasónicos	engineer
2005	Shinola, Vol. 1	Ween	producer, engineer, mixer, keyboards, bass
2007	La Cucaracha	Ween	producer, engineer, mixer, keyboards, bass
2007	The Friends EP	Ween	producer, engineer, mixer, keyboards
2011	A Propósito	Babasónicos	bass
2013	Romantisísmico	Babasónicos	producer
2015	Strangers to Ourselves	Modest Mouse	producer
2016	Godweensatan Live	Ween	Bass, Keyboards
2021	The Golden Casket	Modest Mouse	Producer
