= Claude Coleman Jr. =

American drummer

- Coleman performing in 2007

Background information
- Born: Newark, New Jersey, U.S.
- Occupation: Drummer
- Years active: 1989–present
- Website: amandlanet.net

Claude Coleman Jr. is an American musician, best known as the drummer for the alternative rock group Ween. He has also worked with Eagles of Death Metal, Chocolate Genius, Elysian Fields, Skunk and more. He served as a touring member of Mike Dillon's band on multiple occasions.

A multi-instrumentalist, Coleman is also the singer/songwriter for his own group Amandla.

Coleman survived a near-fatal car crash on August 7, 2002, in which he suffered multiple pelvic fractures and brain injuries. During his extensive and difficult recovery, members of Ween organized a series of benefit concerts on October 7 and 8, 2002, hosted at New York's Bowery Ballroom. Josh Freese performed with Ween in Coleman's place. Coleman eventually recovered, and remained an active member of Ween until their dissolution in 2012 and since their reunion in 2016.

Coleman is also active in music education through the Paul Green School of Rock, and through the New York City music program Music Ascension.

A resident of Maplewood, New Jersey, he is a graduate of Columbia High School in Maplewood.

== Discography ==
Main articles: Ween discography

With Ween

- Chocolate and Cheese (1994)
- The Mollusk (1997)
- White Pepper (2000)
- All Request Live (2003)
- Shinola vol.1 (2005)
- La Cucaracha (2007)

With Amandla

- Falling Alone (2001)
- The Full Catastrophe (2006)
- Laughing Hearts (2018)

With the Dean Ween Group

- The Deaner Album (2016)
- Rock2 (2018)
