= The Friends EP =

EP by Ween
- Released: June 19, 2007
- Length: 19:50
- Label: Chocodog
- Producer: Andreas Litterscheid, Reinhard Raith, Andrew Weiss, King Jammy, Ween, additional recording by Greg Frey.

Ween chronology
| Shinola, Vol. 1 (2005) | The Friends EP (2007) | La Cucaracha (2007) |

The Friends EP is an EP by the American rock band Ween, released on June 19, 2007 and was set to be released on 12" in July 2007. Ween co-founder and lead guitarist Dean Ween described the EP as "The ultimate party record, filled with good beats and good times. Perfect for your barbecue or doing bong hits or whatever it is that you guys do." A substantially different arrangement of the song "Friends" also appears on La Cucaracha.

Professional ratings
Review scores
| Source | Rating |
|---|---|
| AllMusic | 3.5/5 stars |
| The A.V. Club | A− |
| Pitchfork | 5.2/10 |

== Track listing ==
All tracks written by Ween.

| No. | Title | Length |
|---|---|---|
| 1. | "Friends" | 4:11 |
| 2. | "I Got to Put the Hammer Down" | 2:21 |
| 3. | "King Billy" | 5:57 |
| 4. | "Light Me Up" | 3:29 |
| 5. | "Slow Down Boy" | 3:52 |
| Total length: | | 19:50 |
