= Shinola, Vol. 2 =

Compilation album by Ween
- Released: November 27, 2026
- Label: Rhino
- Compiler: Dean Ween

Ween chronology
Boognish Provides (2026)	Shinola, Vol. 2 (2026)

Shinola, Vol. 2 is an upcoming compilation album by American rock band Ween. It is set to be released on November 27, 2026, for Record Store Day Black Friday. Like its predecessor Shinola, Vol. 1 (2005), it will consist of outtakes from the band's studio albums. Compiling of the tracklist occurred over a period of "about ten years" by Dean Ween, who had also previously unofficially released some of its tracks.

== Track listing ==
Some versions of the tracklist include a song called Pink Surprise, which was later confirmed to be a misprint. The correct track listing goes as follows:

Shinola, Vol. 2 track listing
No.	Title	Length
1.	"Kim Smoltz"
2.	"Young Chou Lin"
3.	"Britney"
4.	"She Caught My Fancy"
5.	"Essex Plaza"
6.	"Kite Flying Man"
7.	"Makin' Love in the Gravy"
8.	"Planet Fantasy (Horsefly)"
9.	"Ooh Vah Lah" (sludge version)
10.	"Hello Johnny"
11.	"I Wuz Nothing"
12.	"Opus Fugue Trilogy"
13.	"The Argus, Pt. 2"
14.	"For So Long"
15.	"Skycruiser"
16.	"Put Your Boobs On"
17.	"The Chancy Boys"
18.	"Shalom Absalom"
19.	"You Can Go Shit in Your Hat (Matt)"
20.	"Weed Whore"
21.	"The Belvodine"
