= Ween =

American rock band

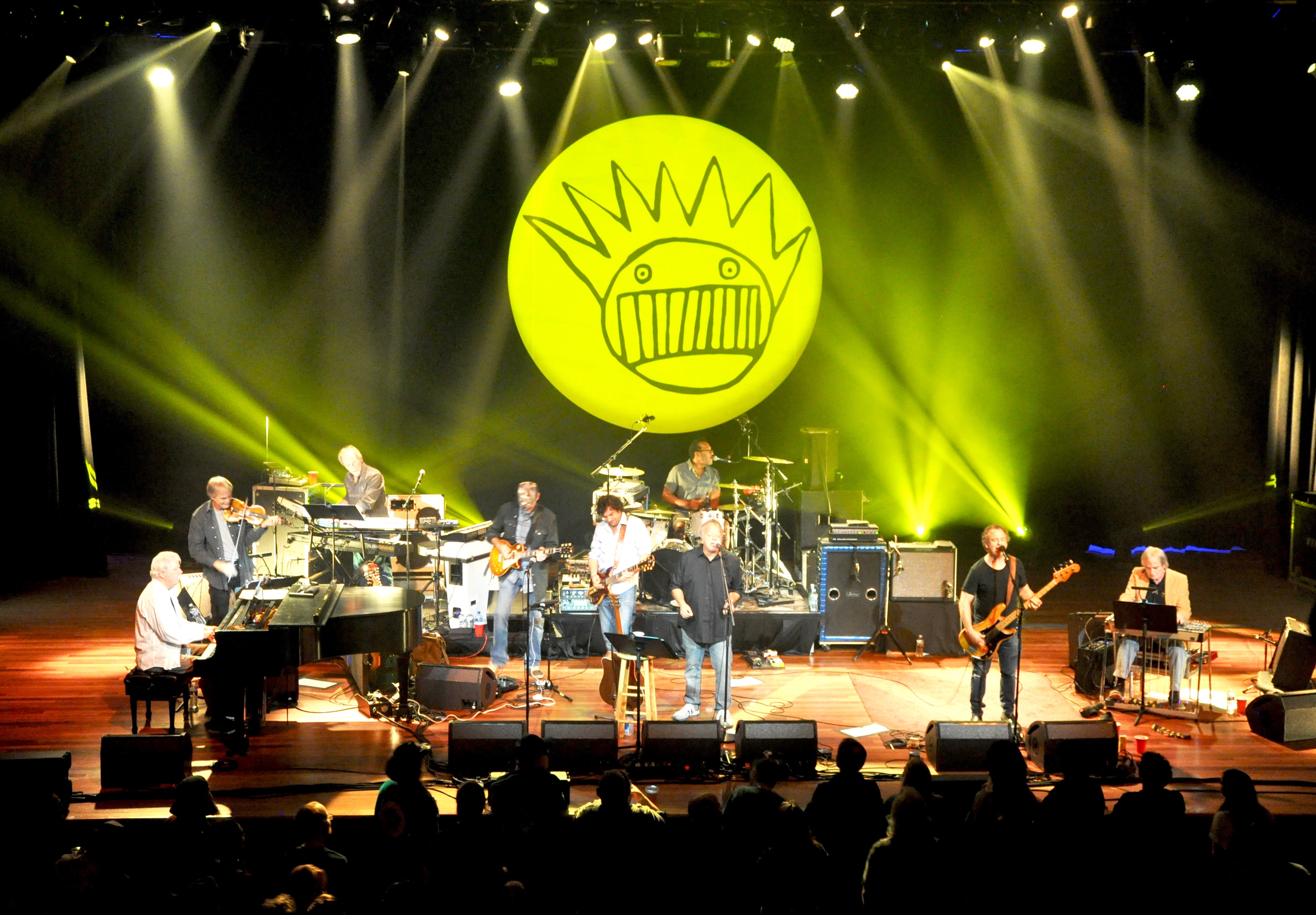
- Ween performing at Ryman Auditorium in 2018

Background information
- Origin: New Hope, Pennsylvania, U.S.
- Genres: Alternative rock; experimental rock
- Years active: 1984–2012; 2015–present (hiatus since 2024)
- Labels: Chocodog; Elektra; Sanctuary; Rounder; Schnitzel; Twin Tone; Shimmy Disc; Bird O' Pray
- Spinoffs: Moistboyz; The Dean Ween Group; Gene Ween Band; Z-Rock Hawaii
- Members: Gene Ween; Dean Ween; Dave Dreiwitz; Claude Coleman Jr.; Glenn McClelland
- Past members: Andrew Weiss; Mean Ween
- Website: ween.com

Ween is an American rock band from New Hope, Pennsylvania, that was formed in 1984 by Aaron Freeman and Mickey Melchiondo, better known by their respective stage names Gene Ween and Dean Ween, who are the band's sole constant members. Generally categorized as an alternative rock band, they are known for their irreverent, highly eclectic catalog of songs inspired by funk, psychedelia, soul, country, gospel, prog, R&B, heavy metal, and punk rock.

Ween self-released several cassette albums from their formation until 1989, after which they officially released three lo-fi albums: GodWeenSatan: The Oneness (1990), The Pod (1991), and Pure Guava (1992). For Pure Guava, the band signed with major label Elektra Records. The album spawned the single "Push th' Little Daisies", which was a chart hit in Australia and the United States. Under Elektra, the band released four professionally recorded albums: Chocolate and Cheese (1994), 12 Golden Country Greats (1996), The Mollusk (1997), and White Pepper (2000). They later returned to independent labels for the albums Quebec (2003) and La Cucaracha (2007). Freeman quit the band in 2012 citing a need to treat his alcohol and drug abuse. Ween reformed in late 2015 and toured extensively without plans to record new material, but later entered an indefinite hiatus in 2024 citing Melchiondo's mental health as a reason.

For their first decade, Ween performed live as a duo backed by a Digital Audio Tape with pre-recorded drum machine patterns. Chris Williams, better known by his stage name Mean Ween, occasionally joined on bass guitar. With the release of Chocolate and Cheese, they stopped playing with Williams and expanded to a four-piece for live performances, later adding a fifth member. Their live members include drummer Claude Coleman Jr., bassist Dave Dreiwitz, and keyboardist Glenn McClelland. Ween also collaborated extensively with Andrew Weiss, who joined the band as a bassist in 1989 and also produced five of their nine studio albums. Despite never receiving much mainstream recognition, Ween has developed a large, devoted cult following and garnered critical acclaim.

== History ==
=== Early years (1984–1989) ===
Aaron Freeman and Mickey Melchiondo met in a junior high school typing class in 1984. Freeman recalled, "We didn't like each other. He was a jock, and I was more of a trench-coat guy. But we sat next to each other in typing class and both realized we were into music." The name Ween was a word made up by the duo, a combination of the words wuss and penis. Their earliest home recordings were drug-fueled and free-spirited; Melchiondo would later say about this era, "the music was designed to be obnoxious".

From 1984 until 1994, Ween's live lineup consisted of Freeman on lead vocals and occasional rhythm guitar, Melchiondo on lead guitar and backing vocals, and a Digital Audio Tape (DAT) machine providing the pre-recorded backing tracks. They self-released several cassettes in the late eighties including Mrs. Slack (1984), Erica Peterson's Flaming Crib Death (1986), The Crucial Squeegie Lip (1987), Axis: Bold as Boognish (1988), The Live Brain Wedgie/WAD (1988), and Prime 5 (1988). In 1987, Freeman also released his own tape, Synthetic Socks, which featured Melchiondo on a few tracks. Ween's public debut was at the New Hope-Solebury High School talent show in 1986, where they performed a cover of Jimi Hendrix's "Purple Haze" with Chris Williams (a.k.a. Mean Ween) on bass and Karl Weimer on drums. Although this era was mostly just Freeman, Melchiondo and the DAT machine, they did play a few shows in the '80s as "The Ween" backed by the Rollins Band rhythm section, Andrew Weiss and Sim Cain.

By 1988, Ween had become regulars at John and Peter's in New Hope and City Gardens in Trenton, New Jersey. At City Gardens, they opened for acts such as They Might Be Giants, Butthole Surfers, and Henry Rollins. Following a February 1990 City Gardens performance where Ween's reception was lukewarm, Rollins got on stage and warned the crowd to "start liking them now", for one day, "you will get down on your filthy knees and crawl to the altar that is Ween".

=== Lo-fi period (1990–1993) ===
Dave Ayers, working in A&R for Minneapolis-based record label Twin/Tone, went to see a live performance by alt-rock band Skunk in the late '80s in Maplewood, New Jersey in anticipation of signing them to a record deal. Ween, friends of Skunk, were the opening act that night. Ayers signed Ween to Twin/Tone that night, and would soon become the band's manager. Skunk would break up in 1991 and their drummer, Claude Coleman, Jr., would play a few shows with Ween in 1992 before joining the band full-time in 1994.

Ween's debut album for Twin/Tone, GodWeenSatan: The Oneness, was released on November 16, 1990. It consisted of 26 tracks that were written during their first six years, and can be thought of as a "best of" this era. Some of the songs, such as "You Fucked Up" and "Bumblebee", had already appeared on various Ween cassettes from the late '80s. "You Fucked Up", "Fat Lenny", "Nan", and the retitled Prince cover "L.M.L.Y.P." would become staples of the band's live show for years to come. Ween played their first overseas shows in support of the album, with a series of dates in the Netherlands in December/January 1990–91.

The band released their second full-length album, The Pod, in 1991 on the Shimmy-Disc label. It was recorded on a four-track cassette recorder from January to October 1990. The album borrows its title from the Solebury Township, Pennsylvania apartment in which it was recorded. The duo's use of drum machines, pitch-shifted guitars/vocals and drug-laced humor became a trademark part of their sound. The cover of The Pod was a parody of the cover of the 1975 Leonard Cohen album, The Best of Leonard Cohen, but with the head of Chris "Mean Ween" Williams (who played bass on the Pod track "Alone") in place of Cohen's. Although the liner notes claim the album was recorded under the influence of scotchgard, Freeman would later say that this was tongue-in-cheek. Following the release of The Pod, Ween embarked on their first extensive U.S. tour, as well as a week-long U.K. tour that included a recording with John Peel in the BBC studio. The February 1992 U.K. tour would be Ween's first performances with Claude Coleman Jr., and also featured Shimmy-Disc founder Kramer on bass.

Ween signed with Elektra Records and released their major label debut Pure Guava on November 10, 1992. Pure Guava featured their highest charting single, "Push th' Little Daisies" which gained them media and MTV attention, as the video was a highlighted target on MTV's Beavis and Butt-Head. The song was also a hit in Australia, reaching number 18 on the singles chart. The track "Flies on My Dick" featured lead vocals by Guy Heller, singer of Melchiondo's other band, Moistboyz. Heller would occasionally perform the song live with Ween. Ween toured the U.S. in support of the album, and the show of December 9 in Chapel Hill, NC would later be released as the CD/DVD package At the Cat's Cradle, 1992 in 2008. Also in support of Pure Guava, Ween performed at MTV Spring Break in Daytona Beach, FL as well as on The Jane Pratt Show.

=== Signing with Elektra Records (1994–1996) ===
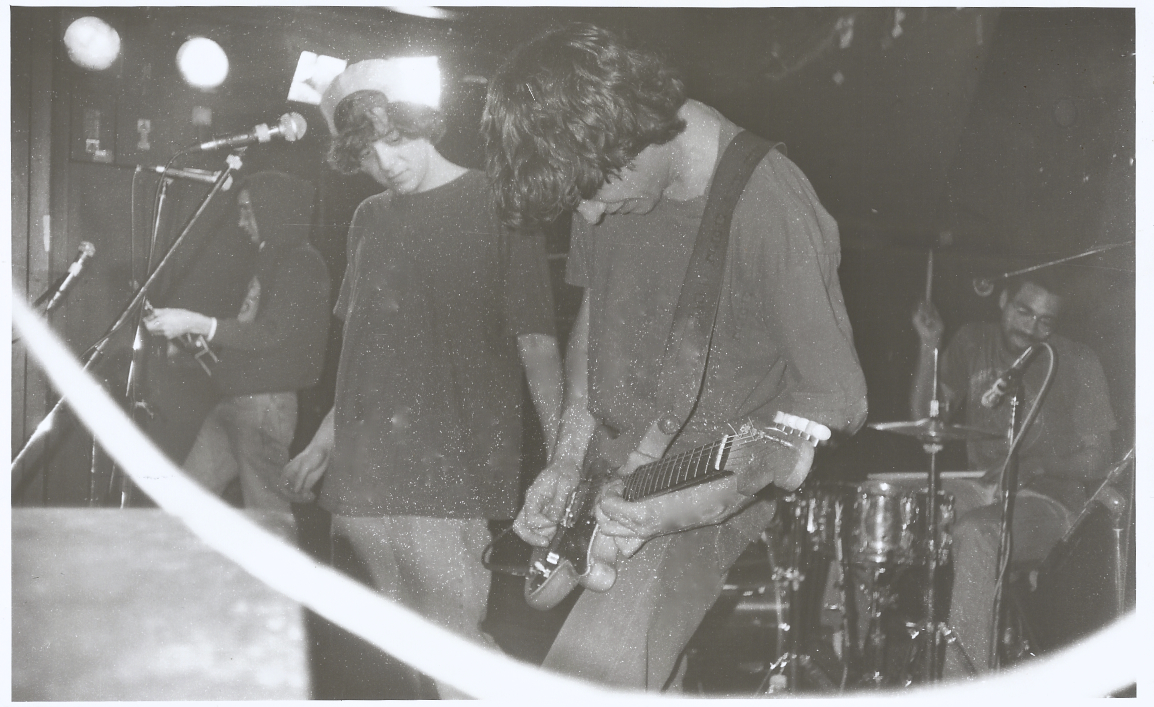
Ween with their expanded live lineup featuring Andrew Weiss, Gene Ween, Dean Ween and Claude Coleman, 1993

Following the release of Pure Guava, Ween began to expand their live and studio lineup, providing both a crisper production sound in the studio and an easier live setup. Claude Coleman Jr. officially joined the band as drummer in March 1994, while Ween's long-time producer Andrew Weiss picked up the bass duties. The Weiss-produced Chocolate and Cheese was released in 1994, featuring tracks influenced by '70s pop/rock and soul, such as "Freedom of '76" and "Voodoo Lady", the latter of which appeared on the Road Trip and Dude, Where's My Car? soundtracks. The "Freedom of '76" music video was directed by Spike Jonze and the video for "I Can't Put My Finger On It" was filmed at a Middle Eastern restaurant and featured actual employees of the restaurant. Both videos would be shown on season 5 of Beavis and Butt-Head in 1995. Ween performed "I Can't Put My Finger On It" on Late Night with Conan O'Brien in January 1995. The Chocolate and Cheese track "Roses Are Free" began being covered by Phish regularly in concert in 1997. Freeman would later comment: "I like Trey Anastasio as a person, but as far as the music goes, all that jam band shit makes me want to puke". In 2011, Chocolate and Cheese would have a book written about it by Hank Shteamer, as a part of the 33⅓ book series about music albums. Of recording the album, Dean Ween said, "I saw someone wrote a book about Chocolate and Cheese, and my son put it in the bathroom. I was reading through it. What people were saying about me and Aaron [Freeman, aka Gene Ween] was that there was all this thought that went into this shit. It's total bullshit. We wrote a lot of material—it was good, we knew it was good—we picked our favorite songs and we put them out on the record. That was it. [Laughter.] And that's been true of every record I've made, from the first Ween record to the second Dean Ween record."

One month prior to the release of Chocolate and Cheese, Ween appeared in the Saturday Night Live film It's Pat, starring Julia Sweeney. The band (which in the film consisted of Freeman, Melchiondo, Weiss, and Weiss' brother John Weiss as the drummer) was featured in a supporting role and performed the Pod track "Pork Roll, Egg & Cheese" and the Pure Guava track "Don't Get 2 Close (2 My Fantasy)". The film was both a critical and box office failure, and was subsequently pulled from theaters one week after its opening weekend.

Also in 1994, Freeman, Melchiondo and Coleman collaborated with Japanese noise rock band Boredoms on a project released two years later as Z-Rock Hawaii. Melchiondo became a big fan of Boredoms upon seeing them live in Philadelphia in 1993, calling them "the heaviest band [he] had ever seen since the Butthole Surfers". Boredoms frontman Yamantaka Eye had previously released an album that heavily sampled Ween's Pod album. These recording sessions took place in a Pennington, New Jersey studio during the recording of Chocolate and Cheese.

Ween turned to Nashville studio musicians and producer Ben Vaughn for the November 1995 recording of 12 Golden Country Greats (1996) which contained only ten tracks. There are two theories regarding the title of the album. The first claim is that it refers to the dozen veteran musicians, known as The Shit Creek Boys, who played on the album. The second claim refers to the fact that the band did indeed record twelve songs during the demo sessions for the album. When it came time to record the actual album, the band chose not to use the songs "I Got No Darkside" and "So Long, Jerry" but kept the album title. "So Long, Jerry", a tribute to the then recently deceased Jerry Garcia, was featured as a B-Side on the "Piss Up a Rope" single. Sticking to Nashville tradition, Freeman and Melchiondo provided only vocals, allowing The Shit Creek Boys to play all the instruments. Elvis Presley's former backing vocal quartet The Jordanaires appeared on the tracks "I'm Holding You" and "Powder Blue".

After a brief return to the original lineup of Freeman, Melchiondo and the DAT machine for a series of dates opening for the Foo Fighters, Ween toured with the Shit Creek Boys in October 1996. This lineup performed not only 12 Golden Country Greats material, but also played Ween songs from previous eras with added country instrumentation, including the Pure Guava tracks "Pumpin' 4 the Man" and "Push th' Little Daisies" and the Chocolate and Cheese tracks "What Deaner Was Talkin' About" and "Buenas Tardes Amigo". Parts of the show of October 23 at Toronto's Phoenix Concert Theatre would later be released as the album, Live in Toronto Canada (2001).

=== Commercial breakthrough (1997–2001) ===
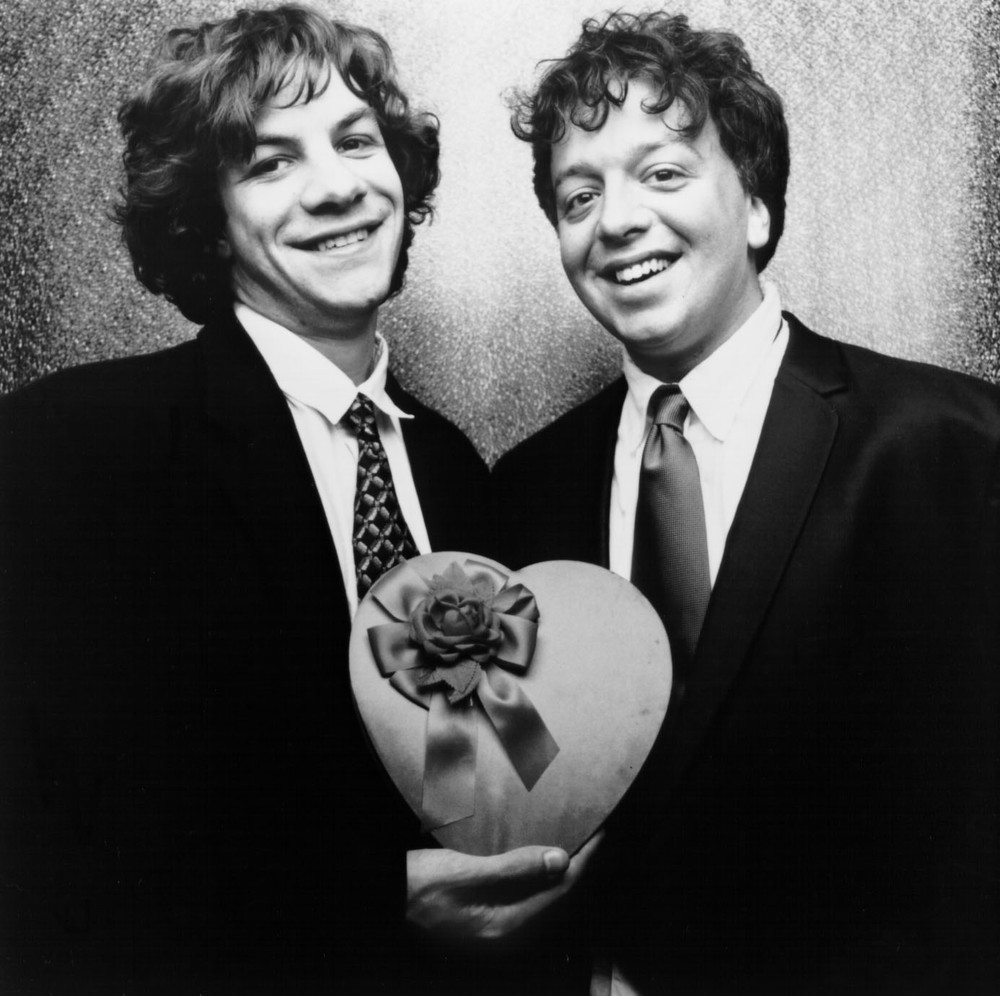
Founding members Mickey Melchiondo (Dean Ween) and Aaron Freeman (Gene Ween), pictured in 1997

The nautically themed album The Mollusk followed in 1997. The album was another eclectic set showing Ween's penchant for satire, deconstruction, and pastiche, including 1960s Brit-pop, sea shanties, Broadway show tunes, and especially progressive rock. Months prior to its release, Freeman would describe the album as "our dark, acid rock record". In 2007, Melchiondo himself named The Mollusk his favorite among Ween's oeuvre. The Mollusk was the album to finally feature studio recordings of "Buckingham Green" and "The Blarney Stone", both of which had been performed regularly in concert for years. Although they did not play on the album, bassist Dave Dreiwitz and keyboardist Glenn McClelland joined the band in April 1997; their debut was a performance of the Mollusk track "The Golden Eel" on an episode of the Comedy Central show Viva Variety. The lineup of Freeman-Melchiondo-McClelland-Dreiwitz-Coleman would remain the same until Ween's hiatus in 2012.

Following the release of The Mollusk, Ween contributed two songs to two different Trey Parker/Matt Stone projects. The song "Love" appeared in the film Orgazmo in September 1997. The song "The Rainbow", as well as Freeman and Melchiondo themselves, appeared in a season 2 episode of South Park, titled "Chef Aid" in October 1998. It was later released on the compilation Chef Aid: The South Park Album. Parker & Stone later directed the music video for the White Pepper track "Even If You Don't". The band's desire to pursue alternate forms of media led to the MP3-only release Craters of the Sac (1999), presented by Melchiondo for online download and free trade. Elektra Records released a live compilation titled Paintin' the Town Brown: Ween Live 1990-1998 in 1999.

Ween's seventh studio album, White Pepper, was the band's final studio release for Elektra and was released May 2, 2000. The pop-themed, Lennon-McCartney–inspired album produced two singles: "Even If You Don't", which was made into a music video directed by Trey Parker and Matt Stone, and "Stay Forever". Shortly before the release of White Pepper, Ween started the Internet radio station WeenRadio, which was awarded third best Internet music site by Rolling Stone. In July 2000, Ween performed the White Pepper track "Exactly Where I'm At" on the Late Show with David Letterman.

In November 2000, Ween contributed the song "Loop de Loop" for the SpongeBob SquarePants episode "Your Shoe's Untied". SpongeBob creator Stephen Hillenburg had contacted Ween and told them that The Mollusk was one of the show's biggest inspirations. Many future episodes of SpongeBob would also contain subtle references to Ween. Additionally, the Mollusk track "Ocean Man" was featured in the closing credits of The SpongeBob SquarePants Movie in 2004. Ween also teamed up with Ben Vaughn to compose and perform the theme song and the interstitial music for the sitcom Grounded for Life which aired from 2001 to 2005.

Ween formed their own label in 2001, Chocodog Records, which oversaw the release of several self-produced live sets. Paintin' the Town Brown, which was compiled and mastered by the band, was meant to be the first Chocodog release. According to Melchiondo, once the album was completed, Elektra realized the sales potential of the CD and denied Ween the right to release it through Chocodog. Later, Ween released the first official Chocodog album, Live in Toronto. The limited-pressing CD, available exclusively through the band website, became an instant collector's item. Subsequent Chocodog releases were produced in higher volumes to meet demand. To celebrate the re-release of the band's debut album GodWeenSatan: The Oneness, Ween returned to the original lineup of Freeman, Melchiondo, and the DAT to perform the album in its entirety on September 14, 2001, at John and Peter's in New Hope. Taping was not permitted at this show; not for long was it "the ultimate unreleased bootleg" as Melchiondo called it; it was released in 2016 as GodWeenSatan Live.

=== Return to independent labels, live albums (2002–2007) ===
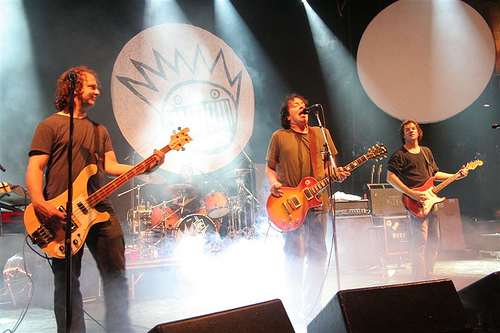
Ween performing in Edmonton in 2007

On August 7, 2002, Claude Coleman Jr. was seriously injured in a car accident on Route 78 near Newark, New Jersey, suffering a broken back and pelvis. Ween quickly organized a couple of benefit shows at New York City's Bowery Ballroom in October to help cover his medical bills. Ween recruited Vandals drummer Josh Freese to perform at these gigs as well as on the band's next album, Quebec. Coleman would make his comeback in December, backing up Freeman at an acoustic show in Brooklyn. Also in December, Ween would release the three-disc Live at Stubb's, which contained parts of two performances in Austin, Texas from July 2000 during the White Pepper tour.

Ween signed to Sanctuary Records and released Quebec, their first studio release in three years, on August 5, 2003. Quebec was noticeably darker in tone than much of Ween's work; according to Freeman, many of the songs were written as he was going through a divorce: "I wrote most of these songs right before the end [of the relationship]. A lot of these songs are about that. Even if it's not direct, you can feel the beginning of the end of the breakup in these songs." Melchiondo would add, "I like it as a record, but it's very negative. It's one of our darker records, I think. I don't listen to any of our records, but I have never listened to that one." On September 3, Ween performed the Quebec track "Happy Colored Marbles" on Last Call with Carson Daly.

Later that year, the band held a poll on their official message boards to select songs for the band to play on their forthcoming live-in-studio album All Request Live. Released on November 22, the album would feature a performance of all five parts of "The Stallion" (Parts 1 & 2 from The Pod, Part 3 from Pure Guava, the unreleased Part 4 from the demos for Chocolate and Cheese, and Part 5 from Craters of the Sac). On November 3, 2017, they would perform "The Stallion Suite" live at Stubb's BBQ in Austin, TX. All Request Live also included rarely played early Ween tracks such as "Pollo Asado", "Mononucleosis", and "Cover it with Gas and Set it on Fire", and Ween's rejected Pizza Hut jingle, "Where'd the Cheese Go?".

In 2004, Ween released Live in Chicago, a DVD and CD set that compiled tracks from two live performances from the Quebec tour at Chicago's Vic Theatre in November 2003. After playing the festival circuit in the summer, Ween hit the road for a West Coast tour in October. Following the show of October 17 in San Diego, Ween's manager Greg Frey announced that the upcoming Midwest tour would be canceled so Freeman could enter alcohol rehab. In the statement, Frey wrote: "There is a problem within the band, that requires immediate intervention, for the health, welfare, and safety of one of its members. For this member, years of touring have taken their toll." Ween would take a year-long hiatus from touring before hitting the road again in October 2005.

In 2005, Ween hit the studio to record better quality versions of previously unreleased songs for the compilation Shinola, Vol. 1. The twelve tracks were all, according to Melchiondo, "songs we regretted not putting on other records". The tracks spanned the band's career, from "Tastes Good on th' Bun", a Pod outtake, to "Someday", a Quebec outtake. Different versions of three of the songs, "Big Fat Fuck", "How High Can You Fly?" and "Monique the Freak" had previously appeared on Craters of the Sac. Melchiondo would later comment, "We called it Volume 1, but I don't know if I want to go through that again anytime soon".

In February 2006, Ween rented an old farmhouse and converted it into a working studio. After writing over 50 songs and recording rough versions through 2006, they picked through them and, with Andrew Weiss as a producer, re-recorded album versions for what would become The Friends EP and the full-length La Cucaracha which was released October 23, 2007, on Rounder Records. La Cucaracha, which would prove to be Ween's final album, would later be called a "big piece of shit" by Freeman, adding, "I think the songs on it were good, or a bunch of songs, but overall that was a big clue Mickey and I were finito".

=== Side projects and Vancouver incident (2008–2011) ===
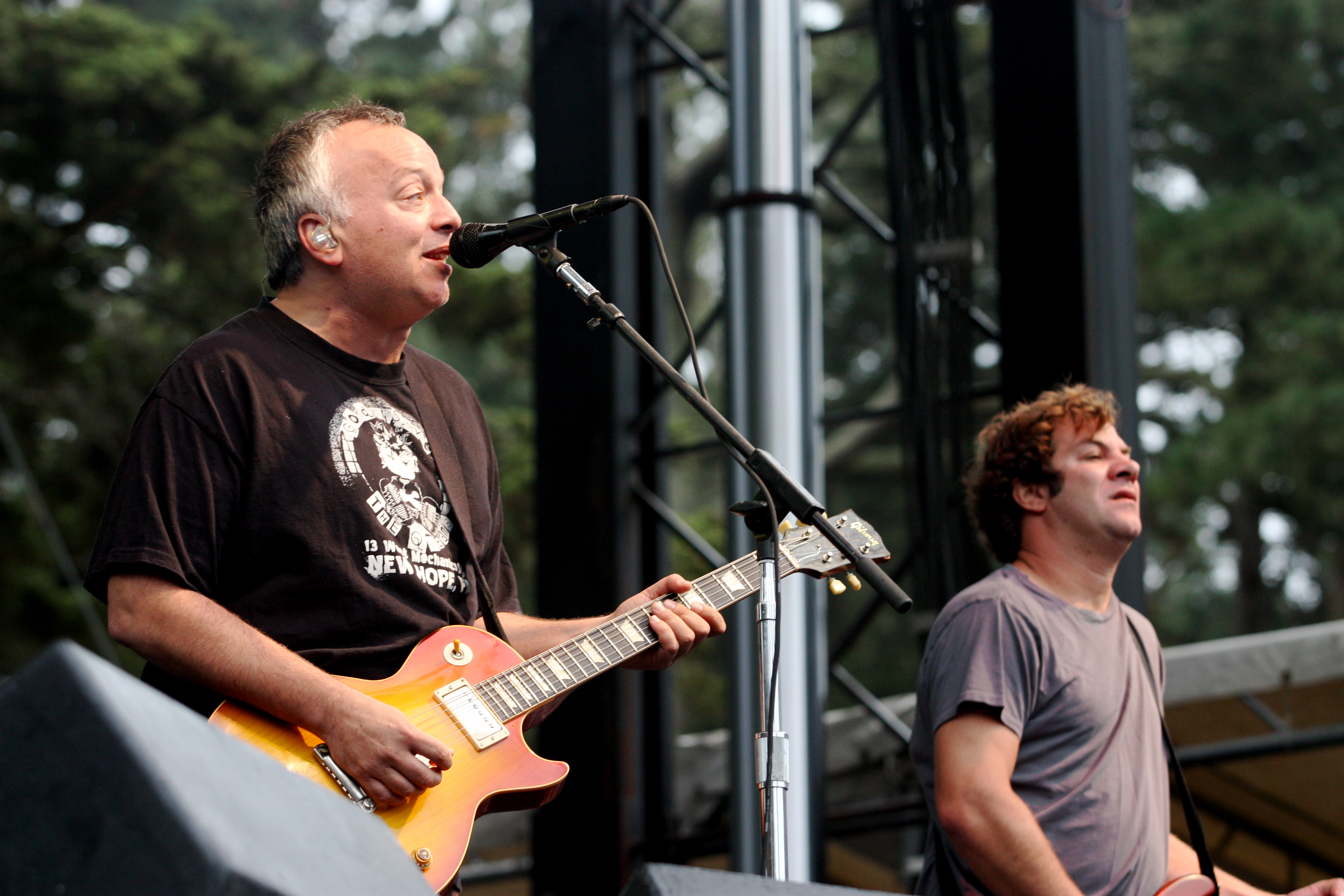
Ween performing at the Outside Lands Music Festival in 2009

On September 21, 2008, Melchiondo announced on the official Ween website that they planned to release a CD-DVD combo before Christmas of that year. He stated, "This time we're going to be going all the way back to the days when we were still a duo with a cassette deck in the early 90s. It's probably the brownest CD on the Chocodog label yet." That CD was titled At the Cat's Cradle and was recorded live at the Cat's Cradle in Carrboro, North Carolina on December 9, 1992. The package also included a DVD featuring some video of performances from the same era.

Although Freeman had occasionally played solo acoustic shows before 2008, he turned his focus towards these shows—billed as "Gene Ween"—following the La Cucaracha tour. In December 2008, he began performing with "The Gene Ween Band", which featured Dreiwitz on bass along with Joe Russo on drums and Scott Metzger on guitar. The set-lists of these shows featured more obscure Ween songs rarely played at Ween shows, a few covers, as well as numerous Freeman-penned songs being performed for the first time. Freeman would perform dozens of shows both solo and with the Gene Ween Band from 2008 to 2011. His first solo record, Marvelous Clouds, an album of Rod McKuen covers, would be released three weeks before Ween's breakup.

While Freeman was working on non-Ween musical projects, Melchiondo turned his focus to fishing. Melchiondo, who spent a lot of time in his youth at his parents' beach house in Beach Haven, New Jersey, became a licensed fishing boat captain and hosted a web series, "Brownie Troop Fishing Show", from 2008 to 2011. As of 2026, he no longer offers trips on his website, "Mickey's Guide Service", but continues to fish recreationally. In 2013, it was announced that Trey Parker and Matt Stone would be producing a pilot for a reality television show about fishing, starring Melchiondo and Les Claypool.

During this period, Ween began scaling back their international touring. In an interview with Bizarre Magazine in 2007, Dean stated that the band hated doing international tours, saying "It's bad enough to have to sit in a hotel room in the middle of Iowa, where at least a dollar is worth a dollar and you can take care of your own transportation and food. Being overseas always makes me wanna kill myself. The band has come close to breaking up after each and every European tour we've ever done, going all the way back to 1990."

On February 3, 2010, Ween released a new song, "DC Won't Do You No Good", that became available through a Target Cancer website. On July 28, 2010, the National Post featured an article, with an interview with Melchiondo, in which it was stated that the band was due in the studio the following winter to start work on their tenth album. However, that album never came out.

Ween embarked on a brief West Coast tour at the beginning of 2011. The first show of the tour, January 24 at the Queen Elizabeth Theatre in Vancouver, British Columbia, was a turning point in Ween's history. Freeman played the tambourine off-beat on the first song, "Fiesta". His vocals were off-key throughout the night, and he appeared to be heavily intoxicated. Eventually, Freeman lay down on stage while the rest of the band played an instrumental, jam version of the Carpenters song "Superstar". As Freeman began tuning his guitar in preparation for "Birthday Boy", Melchiondo and Dreiwitz walked off the stage, while Coleman and McClelland switched instruments. After "Birthday Boy" was finished, Coleman and McClelland left Freeman to play the final four songs by himself off-key. The band performed in Seattle, Washington, the following night with no issues. Freeman later wrote a song about the Vancouver incident, "Covert Discretion", which appeared as the opening track to the self-titled debut album by his new band, called Freeman, in 2014. That same year, he commented, "You don't blow it on stage, lying on your back, screaming nonsense in front of 5,000 people and not try to change something. Chances are when you're doing something like that, you've got to do something differently."

=== Breakup (2011–2015) ===
On August 11, 2011, Melchiondo quietly released an MP3-only collection of songs called The Caesar Demos, named after the band's original working title for Quebec, to friends on his Facebook page. In his comment, he stated the songs were all recorded between 2001 and 2003 while Claude Coleman was recovering from injuries sustained in a car accident, and that many of the tracks featured only himself and Freeman. In addition to a handful of tracks that eventually made Quebec, Caesar Demos would also feature several previously unreleased tracks.

Freeman announced to Rolling Stone on May 29, 2012, that he was "retiring Gene Ween", and a few days later, Ween's manager, Greg Frey, told fans on Facebook that Freeman had decided to "end his musical relationship with Ween", in order to "more fully explore and pursue his solo career". Melchiondo appeared to be unaware of this, stating, "This is news to me, all I can say for now I guess". On July 20, Melchiondo addressed the supposed "breakup" and stated "I can only speak for myself, but as far as I'm concerned, as long as Aaron and I are both alive on this planet, Ween is still together. We've never broken up. The idea of quitting is just laughable. This isn't something you can quit. This is a life sentence."

Although no one knew it at the time, Ween's final performances for more than four years were a three-night run at Denver's Fillmore Auditorium December 29–31, 2011, with "The Blarney Stone" being the final song performed by the band until their 2016 reunion. Melchiondo quickly re-formed Moistboyz, which had been on a six-year hiatus, and also started a new band, The Dean Ween Group. Freeman played solo shows until 2014, when he began touring and recording with his new band, "Freeman". In 2015, Freeman began using the Gene Ween moniker again for live performances.

=== Reunion (2015–2024) ===
On November 16, 2015, Ween announced that they would reunite for two concerts at the 1stBank Center in Broomfield, Colorado on February 12 and 13, 2016. During ticket presale, a third show was added on February 14, 2016 due to demand. Throughout 2016, Ween played sporadic reunion shows in Minneapolis, Philadelphia, Los Angeles, Boston, New York, and San Francisco. The band also made festival appearances in Toronto, Chicago, Portland, Arrington, Virginia, Okeechobee, Florida, and Manchester, Tennessee, for Bonnaroo, which was streamed online via Red Bull TV. The band was also due to appear in April at Levitation Festival in Austin, which was canceled the day before the weekend began.

A sequel to the first outtakes collection, Shinola Vol. 1, was confirmed to be in the works by Dean Ween on Facebook in January 2016. However, a Shinola Volume 2 would not see the light of day until Black Friday Record Store Day 2026. On October 19, 2016, the band announced the release of the live album GodWeenSatan Live, which was recorded on September 14, 2001, and features the band performing its debut album in its entirety. It was released on November 16, 2016. On June 1, 2018, Warner Brothers released a compilation album titled Bananas and Blow; according to Melchiondo, the band had no knowledge of the compilation until it was released. Melchiondo noted that the song choice for the compilation felt "random".

While no new recordings have been made by Ween since their reunion, several of its members have done side projects or collaborated with other artists since 2015. Claude Coleman's side project Amandla released their third album Laughing Heart in 2017 and toured behind the record through that year and into 2018. In 2018, Dean Ween released the second studio album by The Dean Ween Group, "rock2", and toured solo behind it. In 2019, both Dean and Glenn McClelland assisted with the making of funk band Solid Bronze's debut album The Fruit Basket. Dean co-produced the album along with Chris Harford, the album was recorded in his personal studio, and both Dean and McClelland appeared on several tracks as performers.

Like most concert tours by music artists in 2020, Ween's touring was disrupted by COVID-19; dates for June and July were postponed into 2021.

On August 9 and 10, 2022, Ween played the South Park 25th Anniversary Concert alongside Primus and South Park creators Matt Stone and Trey Parker. It was broadcast on Comedy Central on August 13 and on Paramount+ on August 14.

=== Canceled 40th anniversary show and hiatus (2024–present) ===
2024 had marked 40 years since the band as a whole formed, and 30 years since their fourth album Chocolate and Cheese was released. The band was initially planning to celebrate these milestones in two major forms: a reissue of Chocolate and Cheese, featuring the original tracks remastered by Bernie Grundman and 15 outtakes and demos, and a tour that would cap off with a concert at Philadelphia's Mann Center where they would play Chocolate and Cheese in full. The reissue of Chocolate and Cheese ended up being fairly successful, with the vinyl selling more than 5000 units in its first week, enough for it to hit number 15 on Billboard's Top Album Sales chart and number 3 on the magazine's Vinyl Albums chart. The tour, however, would not go as well. In March, the first few dates of the tour, which would've seen the band play across the Southeastern United States, ended up being canceled, with the band saying this was to preserve Dean Ween's "mental and spiritual wellbeing". The band proceeded on in August, playing shows in Missoula and Spokane. However, on August 6, just hours before they were supposed to take the stage in Seattle, they canceled the remaining dates in the northwest, leaving only the Mann Center show on their schedule. Three weeks later, on August 29, 2024, that show was canceled as well, with the band announcing via their social media that they would be ceasing live performances "for the foreseeable future," citing Melchiondo's ongoing mental health issues related to the stress of touring.

As of 2025, there have been no updates on Ween returning to touring or recording, but during a July interview that year, drummer Claude Coleman stated "I think everyone is still kind of in a holding pattern, and everyone is hoping for the best for everybody involved, including the sort of primary person, which is the attention focus of everything, you know, Big Deaner."

With the band not releasing new music or touring, coupled with the success of the Chocolate and Cheese deluxe edition, starting in the mid-2020s, Ween began to focus more on reissues and archival releases. For the Black Friday Record Store Day of 2025, Ween reissued Shinola. On February 4, 2026, Ween announced a new compilation album, Europe "90", as a Record Store Day exclusive, to be released via Rhino Records. The compilation consists of two parts: the first is a studio session recorded on Christmas Day 1990, featuring an early version of "Push th’ Little Daisies" along with three songs that never appeared on a studio album (but have been performed live by the band many times); the second is a live album documenting a performance in Basel, Switzerland from around the same period, which Dean described as "the best Ween show of all time.". This released on vinyl April 18, 2026 and on streaming on August 28, 2026. On February 12, 2026, the band announced Bring Out the Foos: Live 1996, a new live album covering their time opening for the Foo Fighters in 1996, along with vinyl reissues of White Pepper and Quebec, as well as The Brown Box, a CD box set containing all of their studio albums and Shinola Vol. 1. Bring Out The Foos released on February 27, 2026, and The Brown Box released on April 10, 2026. In May 13, 2026, Ween announced the release of the deluxe version of their 12 Golden Country Greats album, which contains unreleased tracks and demos that were made during the creation of the studio album. It was released on July 31, 2026. On September 25, 2026, Ween announced the 14 CD / two vinyl sampler box set Boognish Provides, containing seven previously unreleased shows from the Chocolate and Cheese tour, which released on October 16, 2026. On October 6, 2026 Ween announced Shinola, Vol. 2, set to be released for Record Store Day on November 27, 2026.

== Style and influences ==
Ween is known for its far-reaching musical approach, which is influenced by many different genres of music. This style has been termed alternative rock and experimental rock by critics and journalists. Melchiondo once stated, "Each of us had different things in our record collections that the other one didn't have. Aaron's dad had a lot of psychedelic records, I was really into punk rock, and we would just turn each other on to music." Freeman remarked in 2011, "I think when Ween formed I was really into the synthesizer new wave thing of the mid-'80s and Mickey was more into the punk rock thing".

Both Freeman and Melchiondo have stated several times that one of the band's biggest influences was Prince. The GodWeenSatan track "L.M.L.Y.P." borrows lyrics from two Prince songs, "Alphabet St." and "Shockadelica". Additionally, on rare occasions, Ween has jammed on Prince's "Kiss", placing it in the middle of "Voodoo Lady" during live performances. Other Prince songs covered in concert by Ween include "1999", "Housequake", and "Purple Rain". In 2012, Melchiondo remarked on his website that "by far, hands down the greatest living guitarist in any genre is Prince Rogers Nelson. Prince does so many things well that it's easy to forget that he is also a world class shredder."

Other stated influences include The Beatles, Parliament-Funkadelic, the Butthole Surfers, Pink Floyd, the Dead Kennedys, Laurie Anderson, The Allman Brothers Band, James Brown, Devo, The Residents and Earth, Wind and Fire. In concert, Ween has frequently covered songs by David Bowie, Led Zeppelin, Grateful Dead, Neil Young, Motörhead, Van Halen, The Doors, Frank Sinatra, and Billy Joel. Dean has stated that his favorite album of all time is There's a Riot Goin' On by Sly and The Family Stone.

Because of Ween's wide variety of styles and humorous lyrics, they have often been compared to Frank Zappa. Both members have denied Zappa's influence, and in a 2011 interview, Freeman stated that although he was influenced by The Mothers of Invention, he was never a fan of Zappa's post-Mothers work. Melchiondo says he is not a fan of Zappa because Zappa's take on different genres of music seems sarcastic and insincere. Freeman performed the Mothers-era Zappa song "What's the Ugliest Part of Your Body?" at the Frank Zappa Day Festival in Baltimore in September 2011.

== Themes and mythology ==
From Ween's earliest days, they claimed to be "sprouted from the demon-god Boognish". The image of the Boognish is the band's logo. Boognish is also featured in the lyrics of several Ween songs, including "Up on th' Hill", "Young Chou Lin", and "The Stallion, pt. 4". The band coined their own term "brown", which is used to describe performances, songs, etc. that are "fucked up, in a good way". The word "brown" is also featured in the lyrics of the songs "Can't Put My Finger on It", "Mutilated Lips", "If You Could Save Yourself (You'd Save Us All)", and "Chocolate Town", as well as the title of the band's live album Paintin' the Town Brown. Another commonly used word is "waste" ("Can U Taste the Waste?", "Tender Situation", "Chocolate Town", and "Back to Basom").

The band's lyrics also commonly contain references to the band's members, frequent collaborators, and friends, including Freeman ("I Saw Gener Cryin' In His Sleep", "Up on th' Hill", and "Puffy Cloud"), Melchiondo ("What Deaner Was Talkin' About", "The Goin' Gets Tough From The Getgo", "Puffy Cloud", "The Stallion, pt. 2", and "Leave Deaner Alone"), Williams ("Booze Me Up and Get Me High" and "Sketches of Winkle"), and Weiss ("Young Chou Lin" and "Booze Me Up and Get Me High"). Coleman states that the song "I Don't Wanna Leave You on the Farm" was written about him not wanting to leave his then-girlfriend to go on tour, but denied that "Waving My Dick In the Wind" was about him, calling the idea "complete nonsense".

Ween has also been known for countless references to food, most notably the New Jersey regional favorite "pork roll" (the term generally used in South Jersey) found in the lyrics to four Pod tracks: "Pork Roll, Egg & Cheese", "Frank", "Awesome Sound", and "She Fucks Me". The Pod track "Pollo Asado" features Freeman giving a rendition of a conversation he had with a customer while he worked at New Hope's El Taco Loco. The liner notes of GodWeenSatan: The Oneness instructed Ween fans to bring food for the band to their concerts, with the request updated in the liner notes of Pure Guava to "bring us hot meals. No more junk food, thanks".

== Band members ==
Current members

- Dean Ween (Mickey Melchiondo) – lead and rhythm guitar, backing and lead vocals, etc. (1984–2012, 2015–present)
- Gene Ween (Aaron Freeman) – lead and backing vocals, rhythm and lead guitar, etc. (1984–2012, 2015–present)
- Claude Coleman Jr. – drums, backing vocals (1994–2012, 2015–present)
- Dave Dreiwitz – bass, backing vocals (1997–2012, 2015–present)
- Glenn McClelland – keyboards, backing vocals (1997–2000, 2002–2012, 2015–present)

Former members

- Mean Ween (Chris Williams) – bass, backing vocals (occasional throughout 1986–2000)
- Andrew Weiss – bass (1989–1997), production (1989–2007)

== Discography ==
Studio albums

- GodWeenSatan: The Oneness (1990)
- The Pod (1991)
- Pure Guava (1992)
- Chocolate and Cheese (1994)
- 12 Golden Country Greats (1996)
- The Mollusk (1997)
- White Pepper (2000)
- Quebec (2003)
- La Cucaracha (2007)
