= GodWeenSatan: The Oneness =

1990 album by Ween

Studio album by Ween
- Released: November 16, 1990
- Recorded: 1989–1990
- Studios: Zion House of Flesh; Graphic Sound; Andrew Weiss's Living Room; The Pod (Solebury Township, Pennsylvania)
- Genres: Punk rock; acid rock; heavy metal; comedy rock; experimental rock; slacker rock; funk
- Length: 71:23 (Original Album); 76:31 (2001 edition with three bonus tracks)
- Label: Twin/Tone
- Producer: Andrew Weiss

Ween chronology
Axis: Bold as Boognish (1988)	GodWeenSatan: The Oneness (1990)	The Pod (1991)

GodWeenSatan: The Oneness is the debut studio album by American rock band Ween, released on November 16, 1990, by Twin/Tone Records. The album introduces several key themes for the group, including their eclecticism, gonzo sense of humor, and their demon god/mascot, the Boognish.

The album contains several tracks that are long time staples of Ween's live performances, such as "You Fucked Up", "Fat Lenny", "Marble Tulip Juicy Tree", and "L.M.L.Y.P."

== Background ==
=== Writing ===
The album was written and performed by Aaron Freeman and Mickey Melchiondo, who began writing and recording together when they were 14. They soon adopted the name Ween and began recording home tapes. The apparent earliest GodWeenSatan track, "I Gots a Weasel," first appeared on their 1985 Ween WAD EP in an extended form.

At age 16 Ween released their first album-length tape, The Crucial Squeegie Lip, on Birdo'pray Records, which featured a short version of "You Fucked Up."

On January 10, 1987, Ween played their earliest known live show at 'Weenstock,' a small event held in Freeman's basement. Five months later, they began playing at more prominent venues, such as City Gardens in Trenton, NJ. Shortly afterward, Ween released their second album-length tape, Ween II (Axis: Bold as Boognish), which featured a slower version of "Bumblebee."

Between September and November 1988, Ween recorded a home demo tape referred to as Scraping the Palm for Guava, which contained early versions of four GodWeenSatan songs, "Mushroom Festival in Hell," "Licking the Palm for Guava," "Up on the Hill" and "Don't Laugh (I Love You)."

On January 2, 1989, Ween played a show at Pranzatelli's Stereo and TV in Bound Brook. The show featured the earliest known versions of several GodWeenSatan songs. These included fully formed versions of "Tick" and "Licking the Palm for Guava," shorter unfinished versions of "LMLYP" & "Nan," and extended versions of "Don't Laugh (I Love You)" and "El Camino." An FM broadcast of Ween playing at The Rathskellar on April 18, 1989, showcases Ween performing half of the album's tracks live. The recordings notably feature the earliest known versions of "Never Squeal," "Cold and Wet," "Common Bitch,'' "Old Queen Cole," "Papa Zit," "Squelch the Weasel," and "Fat Lenny."

In January 1990, Ween moved into the Pod, where they continued to record several home tapes. A majority of the released material from these tapes appeared on their second album, The Pod, but songs like "Birthday Boy," "Squelch the Weasel," "Blackjack," & "Puffy Cloud appeared on GodWeenSatan.

Dean Ween later referred to the album as a 'greatest hits' of material the duo had written during their first six years. He used a 1958 Fender Musicmaster during recording.

=== Release ===
By the time the album was released in November of 1990, the duo had already recorded The Pod. GodWeenSatan would be Ween's only release on Twin/Tone.

Restless Records reissued the album on September 11, 2001, jokingly referring to it as the "25th anniversary edition", despite the album only being eleven years old at the time. The reissue featured digitally remastered sound, new packaging, and the inclusion of three bonus tracks—"Bumblebee Part 2", "Stacey", and "Hippy Smell"—integrated into the original album's playlist. The band performed the album in its entirety on September 14, 2001.

In 2016, Ween released GodWeenSatan Live, a live recording from a show recorded on September 14, 2001, during which the group performed the entirety of the album. It was their first live release since 2008. The album was released near the time of The Deaner Album by Melchiondo's side project, The Dean Ween Group.

== Critical reception ==
Professional ratings
Review scores
Source	Rating
AllMusic	4/5 stars
Entertainment Weekly	B+
OndaRock	7/10
Pitchfork	9.6/10
The Rolling Stone Album Guide	3.5/5 stars
Select	4/5
Spin Alternative Record Guide	7/10
Sputnikmusic	4.0/5
Uncut	3/5 stars
The Village Voice	(dud)

David Browne, writing for Entertainment Weekly, praised the album's silliness and frequently ranting nature, writing: "As it veers uncontrollably from the stupid to the unlistenable, God Ween Satan becomes the energizing sound of two street-corner nutjobs railing as best they can against the entire world. Equal opportunity for clever morons to punish the masses with the aid of modern recording equipment — it’s truly a wonderful thing." Andrew Perry of Select wrote that Ween derived their "sonic dementia" from post-hardcore, but that the band's stylistic range was much wider, including parodies of bubblegum pop and lovers rock. He concluded that the "anarchic" album was "unrealistically varied and never boring. You won't have heard the like of this before".

In a retrospective review, Pitchfork's Matt LeMay wrote: "Unafraid to say 'fuck' for no apparent reason, unafraid to rock out on cheesy metal riffs, and unafraid to pick to pieces just about every variety of music, Ween managed to capture the essence of their sound on their debut as well, if not better than, on any later album." Uncut describe the album as containing pastiches of "anything on the rock planet", with Ween offending and delighting the listener "in equal measure". Heather Phares of AllMusic described GodWeenSatan as "almost as eclectic and inspired" as Ween's subsequent albums, with a palpable sense of fun that makes it "more than just a promising debut". Less favorable was Robert Christgau in The Village Voice, who quipped of "L.M.L.Y.P." that Ween "went on about pussy for nine minutes (good idea) in a Princey blues-minstrel drawl (bad one)".

In Punk News' review of The Mollusk, GodWeenSatan and The Pod were said to have carved Ween's 'expansive niche in experimental fits that had numerous great ideas, but lacked focus. Far Out Magazine's retrospective on The Mollusk similarly states that the duo's first two albums featured nothing that "even hinted at anything that could be seen as ‘commercial.’"

== Track listing ==
All tracks written by Ween except "L.M.L.Y.P.", which contains a partial cover of "Shockadelica" and elements of "Alphabet St." by Prince and "El Camino" which contains a partial cover of "White Rabbit" by Jefferson Airplane. Towards the end of "Birthday Boy", "Echoes" by Pink Floyd begins to play, due to Ween recording on cassettes which already contained material.

No.	Title	Length
1.	"You Fucked Up"	1:37
2.	"Tick"	1:53
3.	"I'm in the Mood to Move"	1:16
4.	"I Gots a Weasel"	1:22
5.	"Fat Lenny"	2:07
6.	"Cold and Wet"	1:12
7.	"Bumblebee"	1:19
8.	"Don't Laugh (I Love You)"	2:49
9.	"Never Squeal"	2:25
10.	"Up on the Hill"	1:56
11.	"Wayne's Pet Youngin’"	1:41
12.	"Nicole"	9:20
13.	"Common Bitch"	1:46
14.	"El Camino"	2:17
15.	"Old Queen Cole"	1:34
16.	"Nan"	2:55
17.	"Licking the Palm for Guava"	1:07
18.	"Mushroom Festival in Hell"	2:35
19.	"L.M.L.Y.P."	8:48
20.	"Papa Zit"	1:15
21.	"Old Man Thunder"	0:23
22.	"Birthday Boy"	3:31
23.	"Blackjack"	4:36
24.	"Squelch the Weasel"	3:11
25.	"Marble Tulip Juicy Tree"	5:24
26.	"Puffy Cloud"	2:40
Total length:		71:23

"25th Anniversary Edition" bonus tracks
No.	Title	Length
8.	"Bumblebee Part 2"	1:23
17.	"Stacey"	1:58
23.	"Hippy Smell"	2:11

== Personnel ==
Ween

- Gene Ween – lead vocals
- Dean Ween – electric & acoustic guitars, drums, bass guitar, drum machine, Talk box, keyboards, backing vocals, effects

Additional musicians

- David Williams – backing vocals on "I'm in the Mood to Move"
- Andrew Weiss – piano on “Nicole”; additional bass guitar
- Greg Frey - additional drums
- Lawrence E. Curtin - spoken word on “Marble Tulip Juicy Tree”

Technical

- Andrew Weiss – producer, mixing
- Theo Van Rock – mixing
- Greg Frey – engineer
