= Chocolate and Cheese =

Studio album by Ween
- Released: September 27, 1994
- Recorded: 1994
- Genres: Alternative rock; neo-psychedelia; experimental rock; comedy rock
- Length: 55:25 (original release); 1:41:36 (deluxe edition)
- Label: Elektra
- Producer: Andrew Weiss

Ween chronology
Pure Guava (1992)	Chocolate and Cheese (1994)	12 Golden Country Greats (1996)

Singles from Chocolate and Cheese
- 1. "I Can't Put My Finger on It" Released: 1994; 2. "Freedom of '76" Released: 1994; 3. "Voodoo Lady" Released: 1994

Singles from Chocolate and Cheese (Deluxe Edition)
- 1. "Junkie Boy" Released: 2024; 2. "Voodoo Lady (Demo)" Released: 2024

Chocolate and Cheese is the fourth studio album by the American rock band Ween, first released on September 27, 1994, through Elektra Records. It was the first Ween album to be recorded in a professional studio, in contrast to the four-track home recordings of The Pod and Pure Guava. However, most of the instruments were still played by Dean and Gene Ween, including their drum machine.

After self-producing their previous album, Pure Guava (1992), the band reunited with Andrew Weiss to produce the album. Its broad sound has been described as "genre-hopping", prominently featuring styles of music including psychedelia, country, funk, industrial, and Latin music. Chocolate and Cheese was supported by the singles "I Can't Put My Finger on It", "Freedom of '76", and "Voodoo Lady". Though the album did not perform well commercially, it received positive reviews and has been recognized as one of Ween's signature albums. It received a 30th anniversary deluxe edition re-release on August 2, 2024.

== Background ==
Ween's previous two albums The Pod (1991) and Pure Guava (1992) had been recorded in a very lo-fi setting – the band only had access to their guitars and a four-track cassette TASCAM Portastudio; the albums were recorded in their apartment (nicknamed "The Pod", hence the name of their second album). Having signed to major label Elektra Records, Ween now had access to better resources to record. In addition, drummer Claude Coleman Jr. joined the band, meaning they had live instrumentation as opposed to relying on a drum machine.

As a result, Chocolate and Cheese ended up sounding more hi-fi than Ween's prior works. The sound is clearer due to having been recorded digitally as opposed to the tapes that the first three albums were done on, and the resources the band now had meant they could experiment more than they did in the previous lo-fi set up.

The album is dedicated to comedian John Candy, who died while Ween was putting the album together. "A Tear for Eddie" was dedicated to Parliament-Funkadelic guitarist Eddie Hazel, who died in 1992. In a 2011 interview, Gene Ween credited a Spanish lesson on Sesame Street with inspiring "Buenas Tardes Amigo".

== Songs and lyrics ==
The album has elements of styles such as circus music, country, folk rock, funk metal, industrial music, jazz, Latin music, lounge music, noise rock, psychedelia, soft rock and synth-pop. It has been labelled as a "genre hopping" album due to its variety of styles, with this aspect of the album being further amplified on the 30th anniversary deluxe edition, which includes more songs. On their next album 12 Golden Country Greats (1996), the band intentionally decided to record an album in a single genre, before releasing The Mollusk in 1997, which was described as them going "back to genre hopping".

=== "Take Me Away" ===
"Take Me Away" is a swung guitar-driven composition, often being noted as having parallels with the styles of Elvis Presley and The Doors. It is also noted for its sections where the song is interrupted by the singer thanking the imaginary audience pitifully applauding their performance. The song is a staple of Ween's live shows.

A counterpart to the track, "The Concert is Over," was originally meant to serve as a bookend for the album, but was scrapped after Freeman struggled with the vocal parts. The song can still be found as a demo on YouTube, and was performed at some live Ween performances.

=== "Spinal Meningitis (Got Me Down)" ===
"Spinal Menginitis (Got Me Down)" is notable for its dark subject matter and psychedelic arrangement. Its lyrics consist of a child sick with spinal meningitis (overdubbed with Freeman's vocals in the verses) lamenting to their mother about the illness. The song originated in 1992 after Dean Ween read a newspaper article about a "hillbilly" who referred to spinal meningitis as "Smile on, mighty Jesus." Due to its potentially offensive nature, Elektra did not want the song to appear towards the beginning of the album, but Ween insisted on having it appear as the second track.

=== "Freedom of '76" ===
Released as a single, "Freedom of '76" draws many influences from soul and jazz, serving as a tribute to Freeman's birthplace of Philadelphia. The lyrics make a number of references to Philadelphia landmarks and culture, including the Liberty Bell, cheesesteaks, the R&B vocal group Boyz II Men, and the filming location of Mannequin (although it erroneously claims that it was "filmed at Woolworth's", rather than the John Wanamaker Store). It notably features a high falsetto from Freeman.

The arrangement was assisted by a local Trenton guitar player named Ed Wilson, who taught Melchiondo the jazzy chords strewn throughout the song. He also taught Freeman the bass part of the song, eventually leading the two to put together what they were taught by Wilson into a full song. Andrew Weiss also experimented with multi-tracked backing vocals, contributing to the recording process being particularly meticulous in the band's memory.

=== "I Can't Put My Finger On It" ===
Described as a funk metal track, the lead single "I Can't Put My Finger On It" features distorted vocals with an underlying funk rhythm occasionally broken by sections of clean, reverbed guitar. Freeman and Melchiondo based the song off the caricature of "some guy working behind a counter at a falafel shop. Some big, sweaty, Lebanese motherfucker, slicing meat off the spool of gyro."

The song was performed on Late Night with Conan O'Brien on January 18, 1995, with Ween's first and only appearance on the show.

=== Other songs ===
"The HIV Song" was written in the style of circus music, and has dark lyrics which contrast the music. "Drifter in the Dark" has been described as a 1960s-style country ballad. "Buenas Tardes Amigo" has a Latin-influenced sound that is also reminiscent of the work of film composer Ennio Morricone. "Roses Are Free" has been labelled as an 80s-inspired synth-pop song and an homage to Prince.

"Candi" has elements of industrial music and the band have expressed their dislike for the song, with Dean Ween calling it "the worst song that's on any Ween record." It has only ever been performed twice, in 1994 and 2019. "Baby Bitch" is a folk influenced song that was written about Gene Ween's ex-girlfriend. The song came about after she moved back into the area where he and his future wife were living.

== Packaging ==
The album's title is phonetically similar to the British saying "chalk and cheese", a way of saying that two items have nothing in common. In an interview with Hank Shteamer during the writing of the 33⅓ book about Chocolate and Cheese, Dean Ween said that the original idea for the album art was to "get a sailor, like a gay sailor, in red, white and blue wearing the belt", but the studio rejected this idea, thinking it was inappropriate.

Gene Ween claims to have come up with the idea for the album art that ended up being made, saying "I had it sketched out ... I remember telling Mickey how the top of the [shirt] would cut out right below the nipple line and so it was very important to have big breasts with a large 'under portion'". The creative director of Reiner Design Consultants, Roger Gorman, stated that they were given the direction to make it look like an album cover by the Ohio Players.

The model for the album art was Ashley Savage, and photography was done by John Kuczala. In the early 2000s, the cover was voted "sexiest album cover of all time" by readers of Playboy.com. Seven months after the release of Chocolate and Cheese, Sugar Ray released an album with a similar title called Lemonade and Brownies, which also had female nudity on the cover. The members have mentioned being fans of the artwork of Chocolate and Cheese.

== Related releases ==
"I Can't Put My Finger on It" served as the title track of an EP released by Elektra in 1994, which also included the tracks "A Tear for Eddie", "Now I'm Freaking Out", and "Bakersfield". The same year, "Voodoo Lady" was released by the New Zealand label Flying Nun Records as a 7" single, with "Buenas Tardes Amigo" on the B-side; both songs were also issued on the Voodoo Lady EP in CD format, along with the tracks "There's a Pig" and "Vallejo". "Freedom of '76" was the title track of an EP released by Flying Nun in 1995, which included two versions of the title track plus "Now I'm Freaking Out" and "Pollo Asado".

The first music video for the album was "I Can't Put My Finger on It", followed by "Voodoo Lady", and "Freedom of '76", filmed circa March 1995. CKY guitarist (and dedicated Ween fan) Chad Ginsburg appeared in the "Freedom of '76" promo video as an extra shouting at Gene and Dean after they stole the Liberty Bell.

On top of the Elektra Records release (Elektra 61639-2 US 1994), Chocolate and Cheese was pressed and distributed by the label Grand Royal in the US in 1994 as a 2 LP non-gatefold version (Grand Royal GR 010 US 1994). Flying Nun released two different versions in 1994, one of which came with a bonus 7" single (Flying Nun Records FN314 Europe 1994, no 7") and (Flying Nun Records FNSP314 UK 1994, with 7").

Note that there is a catalog number for the vinyl issue by Elektra Records, but there is no confirmation it was pressed on vinyl at this time, possibly only in promo edition.

=== Deluxe edition ===
On June 7, 2024, Ween announced they would be releasing a deluxe edition of Chocolate and Cheese to commemorate the album's 30th anniversary, with a release date of August 2, 2024. The deluxe edition features both remasters of the original tracks done by Bernie Grundman, as well as 15 previously unreleased tracks. One of these tracks, "Junkie Boy", was released as a single the same day as the announcement. On July 19, a second single was released for the 30th anniversary edition, a demo version of "Voodoo Lady".

The deluxe edition came packaged with a booklet written by Dean Ween giving more details about the album's production, revealing alternate track lists that were considered, giving stories of the album's making, and showing exclusive photos and production notes.

The deluxe edition was a commercial success. Forbes reported that it had sold 5,300 copies in its first week, with sales being strong enough for the deluxe edition to hit number 15 on Billboard's Top Album Sales chart and number 3 on the magazine's Vinyl Albums chart.

== Touring ==
To support the album, Ween toured the United States between September 1994 and March 1995. On January 18, 1995, they performed "I Can't Put My Finger on It" on Late Night with Conan O'Brien, which was taped in New York City. They then went on a tour of Europe and the United Kingdom in March–April 1995. Later in April 1995, they embarked on a tour of Australia, New Zealand and Hawaii. Like on their Pure Guava tour, the Australian leg of shows covered most of the country and ran for 11 dates. Three of the Australian shows were part of the inaugural edition of the Alternative Nation Festival. The event also featured artists such as Body Count, Faith No More, Lou Reed, Nine Inch Nails, Powderfinger, Regurgitator, The Tea Party and Tool, and was discontinued after just a year. In mid-May 1995, Ween returned to playing shows in the United States. They continued to tour the United States throughout the rest of 1995, before releasing their next album 12 Golden Country Greats the following year.

== Reception and legacy ==
Professional ratings
Review scores
Source	Rating
AllMusic	4.5/5 stars
Chicago Sun-Times	3/4 stars
Entertainment Weekly	B
NME	6/10
Pitchfork	9.0/10
Q	4/5 stars
The Rolling Stone Album Guide	4/5 stars
Select	4/5
Spin Alternative Record Guide	8/10
Uncut	9/10

In her review of Chocolate and Cheese for Spin, Terri Sutton observed that Ween "seems to have potty-trained its predilection for lengthy funk deconstructions", limiting their "Prince/Brothers Johnson fixation" to "a prized few taut, sexy saunters" and elsewhere exploring new musical territory by taking influence from Southern rock, Philadelphia soul, and disco, among other styles. "Certifiably insane and dangerously insidious," Paul Rees wrote in Select, "Chocolate and Cheese is the finest argument for dropping out and tuning in to Ween's parallel universe."

Entertainment Weekly's Dimitri Ehrlich was more reserved in his praise, likening Ween to "someone so impossibly weird it almost gives you a headache – yet you think about the things that person said for weeks". Mark Sutherland of NME called Chocolate and Cheese "more like a trip round a very odd compilation than a proper, coherent album", advising listeners "to tape the best bits and ponder on why Ween don't just stop mucking about and record an entire album's worth of similar gems." Robert Christgau selected "Spinal Meningitis (Got Me Down)" as the sole "choice cut" from the album in The Village Voice.

Retrospectively, AllMusic critic Heather Phares lauded Chocolate and Cheese as "a brilliant fusion of pop and gonzo humor" and "arguably Ween's finest moment", which "proved for once and all that along with their twisted sense of humor and wide musical vocabulary, Dean and Gene are also impressive songwriters." Similarly, Pitchfork reviewer Stuart Berman wrote that it showed "that when you scraped away the cruddy production and pitch-shifting chicanery that defined their previous records, Ween were undeniable pop songwriters." Rob Hughes of Uncut found that despite Ween's many "audacious stylistic turns" throughout Chocolate and Cheese, "the songs are so good they transcend notions of pastiche", concluding that the album, while sometimes crossing "the limits of acceptable taste", documents the band's "sheer verve, ideas and invention".

In 2014, Guitar World included Chocolate and Cheese on its list of "50 Iconic Albums That Defined 1994". The entire album was played live as part of the group's setlist at the Desert Daze festival in California on October 12, 2019.

=== Appearances in other media ===
In 1995, the video for "Freedom of '76" appeared in an episode of Beavis and Butt-Head titled "Bus Trip". In 2001, "Take Me Away" was used in the film One Night at McCool's, in addition to being included on the soundtrack album for that film. "Voodoo Lady" can be heard in the 2000 comedy films Road Trip and Dude, Where's My Car?, which coincidentally both starred Seann William Scott. The song was also included on the soundtrack albums for these two films, and in Road Trip, a poster of Chocolate and Cheese can be seen in the dorm room of the characters, alongside a poster of Lida Husik's 1997 album Fly Stereophonic. "Voodoo Lady" had earlier been included on the original version of "In the Bathroom", a skit from the 1990s sketch comedy show The State, while the album track "Buenas Tardes Amigo" was featured in the German films Lammbock and Herr Lehmann. In August 2022, Ween performed "Take Me Away", "Roses Are Free" and an extended version of "Voodoo Lady" for the 25th anniversary concert of the animated series South Park.

=== Covers ===
A number of songs on Chocolate and Cheese have been covered by a variety of other artists in the years since its release.

- "Roses Are Free" has been covered by the band Phish repeatedly. Official releases of their version appear on Phish's live concert albums Hampton Comes Alive (1999) and Live Phish 04.03.98 (2005). The 2000 documentary Bittersweet Motel features the band learning the track backstage at the Rochester War Memorial in Rochester, NY and then transitions into their first onstage interpretation. In an interview from 2015, Melchiondo observed that Ween began playing "Roses Are Free" regularly in concert after Phish began covering it, and credited Phish for boosting the song's popularity. Phish's guitarist, Trey Anastasio, commented to the crowd after their August 7, 2015, cover, suggesting that Mickey and Aaron should play together again, which was followed by Ween's first comeback show at the 1stBank Center in Broomfield, CO on December 2, 2016 where the song was played among 32 others.
- Ash recorded a version of "What Deaner Was Talkin' About". It was released as a B-side on their 1997 single "A Life Less Ordinary", which was written for the film of the same name. This track also features on their limited edition live album, Live at the Wireless.
- Amos Lee performed "Buenas Tardes Amigo" on an iTunes exclusive live album entitled iTunes Live from SoHo.
- Jon Auer (The Posies, Big Star) covered "Baby Bitch" on his solo EP 6 1/2.
- Folk punk musician Sunny War covered "Baby Bitch" on her 2023 album Anarchist Gospel.
- Indie rock band Cherry Glazerr covered "Baby Bitch" as a stand alone single.

== Track listing ==
All tracks are written by Ween, except "Freedom of '76" written by Ween & Ed Wilson.

No.	Title	Lead vocals	Length
1.	"Take Me Away"	Freeman	3:01
2.	"Spinal Meningitis (Got Me Down)"	Freeman	2:53
3.	"Freedom of '76"	Freeman	2:51
4.	"I Can't Put My Finger on It"	Freeman	2:48
5.	"A Tear for Eddie"		4:50
6.	"Roses Are Free"	Freeman, Melchiondo	4:35
7.	"Baby Bitch"	Freeman	3:05
8.	"Mister Would You Please Help My Pony?"	Freeman	2:56
9.	"Drifter in the Dark"	Freeman, Melchiondo	2:32
10.	"Voodoo Lady"	Freeman	3:49
11.	"Joppa Road"	Freeman	3:03
12.	"Candi"	Williams, Freeman, Melchiondo	4:03
13.	"Buenas Tardes Amigo"	Freeman	7:07
14.	"The H.I.V Song"	Freeman, Melchiondo	2:10
15.	"What Deaner Was Talking About"	Freeman	1:59
16.	"Don't Shit Where You Eat"	Freeman	3:20
Total length:			55:25

30th anniversary deluxe edition bonus tracks

All tracks are written by Ween except “I Really Miss You (And I’m All Alone)” Ween & Jerry Kennedy Jr.

No.	Title	Lead vocals	Length
1.	"Crappy Anniversary Jimmy"		3:36
2.	"Warm Socks"	Freeman, Melchiondo	2:42
3.	"Stop, Look, Listen (and Learn)"	Freeman	3:31
4.	"Dirty Money"	Freeman	3:55
5.	"I Got It"	Freeman	2:13
6.	"Belgian Stew"	Freeman, Melchiondo	3:10
7.	"Voodoo Lady" (demo)	Freeman	4:36
8.	"Junkie Boy"	Freeman	3:30
9.	"Smooth Mover"	Melchiondo, Freeman	1:42
10.	"Church Fire"	Freeman	1:41
11.	"Take Me Away" (demo)	Freeman	2:31
12.	"Sasha"	Freeman	3:02
13.	"Roses Are Free" (demo)	Freeman, Melchiondo	3:58
14.	"Candi" (demo)	Williams, Freeman, Melchiondo	2:34
15.	"I Really Miss You (and I'm All Alone)"	Kennedy	3:29
Total length:			1:41:36

== Personnel ==
Ween

- Gene Ween – lead vocals, electric and acoustic guitar, drum machine, keyboards; harmonica on “Drifter In The Dark”
- Dean Ween – electric and acoustic guitar, backing vocals, bass guitar, drum machine, keyboards, drums
- Claude Coleman Jr. – drums, percussion, drum machine, backing vocals
- Andrew Weiss - bass guitar, keyboards, backing vocals; sound effects on “Voodoo Lady”

Additional personnel

- Patricia Frey - drums on “Baby Bitch”
- Stephan Said - classical guitar on “Buenas Tardes Amigos”
- Scott Lowe - programming and backing vocals on “What Deaner Was Talking About”
- Mean Ween – bass guitar and lead vocals on “Candi”

Technical

- Greg Frey – engineer
- Howie Weinberg – mastering
- Andrew Weiss – producer, engineer, mixing
- Kirk Miller – live sound
- Ashley Savage – model
- Danny Clinch – photography
- John Kuczala – photography
- Reiner Design Consultants – design

Deluxe edition reissue personnel

- Gene Ween - vocals (all ext. 31)
- Dean Ween - guitars, bass guitar, drum machine, keyboards, backing vocals; liner notes
- Jerry Kennedy Jr. – words and vocals (track 31)
- Jason Jones – produced reissue for release
- Bernie Grundman – mastering
- Kara Hailele-Griffin Coleman – product manager
- Darryl Norsen, D. Norsen Design – package design
- Sheryl Farber – editorial supervisor
- Photos courtesy of Danny Clinch
- Sean Heydorff, Lisa Glines, Rory Wilson, Amelia Halverson, Steve Woolard, Patrick Milligan, Molly Dolan, Brigid McNally, Mark Ramsey, Dave Kapp, Danny Berman, Trestan Matel, Allison Boron, and Sam Stone – project assistance
- 2024 management by Patrick Jordan and Brad Sands with Lindsay Fitzgerald

== Charts ==
1994–1995 chart performance for Chocolate and Cheese
Chart (1994–1995)	Peak position
Australian Albums (ARIA)	80
US Heatseekers Albums (Billboard)	10

2024 chart performance for Chocolate and Cheese
Chart (2024)	Peak position
Belgian Albums (Ultratop Flanders)	78
US Top Album Sales (Billboard)	15
US Vinyl Albums (Billboard)	3
