= Glenn McClelland =

- Glenn McClelland performing with Ween at the Edmonton Events Centre in Edmonton, Alberta on November 17, 2007

Background information
- Occupation: Musician
- Instruments: Piano, keyboards
- Member of: Ween; Blood, Sweat & Tears; The Happy Dog

Glenn McClelland is an American keyboardist for the band Ween.

== Career ==
Glenn started playing professionally at age 16 in a piano bar, subsequently playing with blues and jazz musicians including Sonny Rhodes, Johnny Copeland, and Richie Cole. In 1987, he joined Blood Sweat and Tears, where he remained until 1995, leaving to join Ween.

According to Dean Ween, Glenn joined Ween after the two met at a bar in 1996. The two started talking about music, and after Dean told Glenn about Ween and Glenn talked about his experience as a keyboardist, Dean invited him to play a bit at his studio. That night they recorded "I'm Dancing In The Show Tonight", the album opener of Ween's 6th album The Mollusk, and Glenn has remained a part of the band ever since.

In 2006, he resumed his membership in Blood, Sweat and Tears (while continuing with Ween). He is the longest-serving current member of Blood, Sweat and Tears. He is also a vocalist and keyboardist for Scott Rednor and His Band and The Happy Dog.

== Personal life ==
He has a son named Charles Glenn McClelland who is also a musician.
