= Gene Ween =

American rock musician

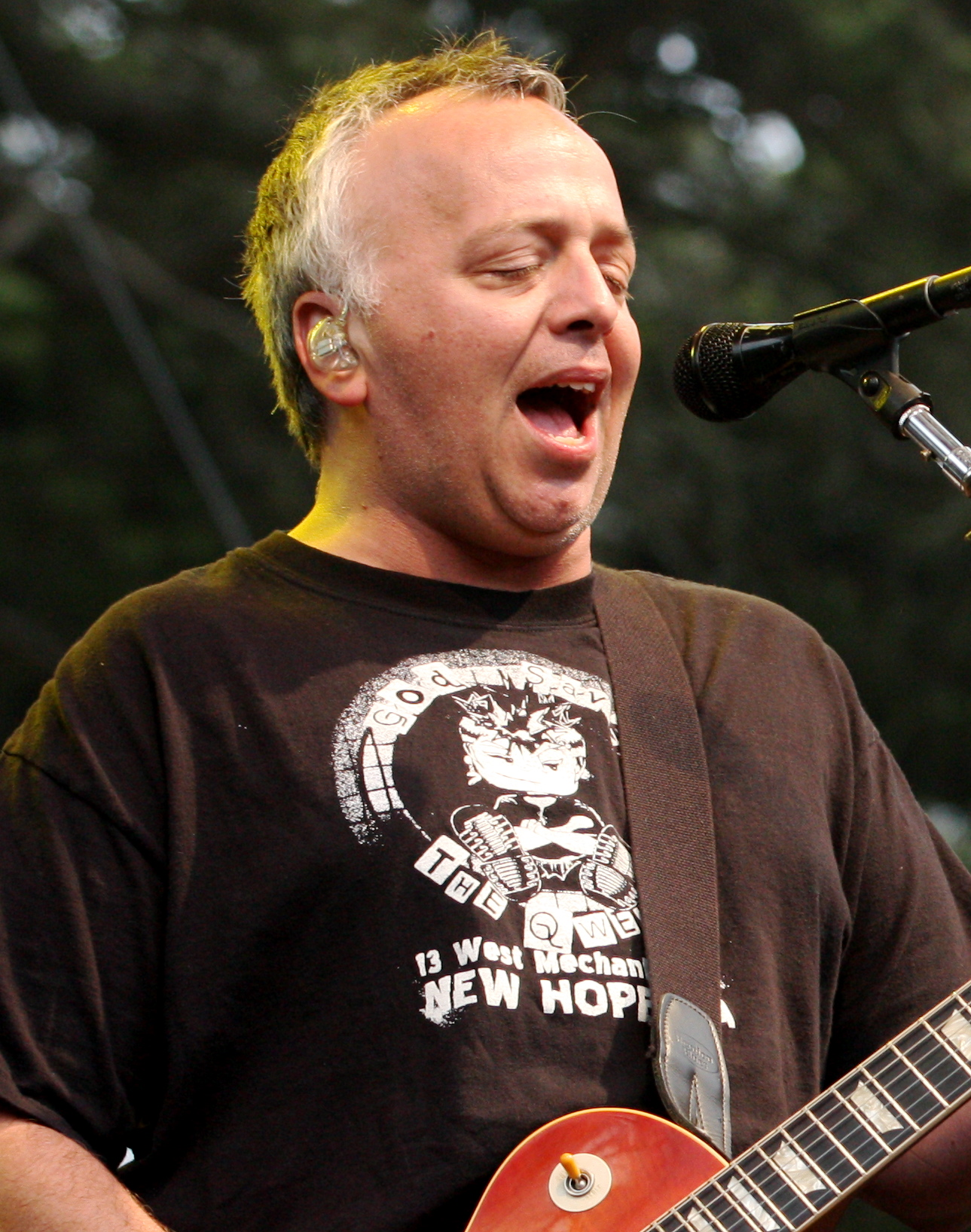
- Gene Ween performing with Ween in 2009
- Born: Aaron Freeman; March 17, 1970 (age 56); Philadelphia, Pennsylvania, U.S.
- Occupations: Musician; singer; songwriter
- Years active: 1984-present
- Musical career
- Genres: Alternative rock; experimental rock; neo-psychedelia; hard rock; lo-fi; funk; country rock
- Instruments: Vocals; guitar
- Labels: Twin/Tone; Shimmy-Disc; Elektra; Chocodog Records; Rhino
- Member of: Ween
- Formerly of: Gene Ween Band; Z-rock Hawaii; Freeman
- Website: geneween.com

Aaron Freeman (born March 17, 1970), better known by his stage name Gene Ween, is an American singer, guitarist and a founding member of the experimental alternative rock group Ween. Freeman, along with childhood friend Mickey Melchiondo (Dean Ween), started the group in the mid-1980s. Ween would expand to five members and perform together until May 2012 when Freeman abruptly quit the band due to his desire to move forward with a solo career, as well as his intention to remain sober. Over the next few years, Freeman would briefly abandon the Gene Ween name and lead a new five-piece band called Freeman. Shortly after reviving the Gene Ween name as a solo act, to perform a series of Billy Joel tribute performances, Ween reunited in February 2016 for three concerts in Broomfield, Colorado. The band continued to perform and tour until going on an indefinite hiatus in August 2024.

== Career ==
Freeman and Melchiondo met in an eighth grade typing class in 1984, in New Hope, Bucks County, Pennsylvania, where they both grew up. Both of them talked about bands they liked and playing their own music. Soon, they hung out and began jamming, recording most of what they put together. Ween's music slowly progressed from a bedroom-style recording project, eventually signing to a major record label and transforming into a full live band.

Freeman occasionally played solo acoustic shows as a side project of Ween. In December 2008, Freeman began performing with Ween bassist Dave Dreiwitz, drummer Joe Russo, and guitarist Scott Metzger as The Gene Ween Band. The band's shows featured rarely played Ween songs, a few covers, and Freeman-penned songs performed for the first time. Freeman would perform dozens of shows, both solo and with the Gene Ween Band, from 2008 to 2011.

In May 2012, Freeman suddenly announced his departure from Ween, as an attempt to rehabilitate himself after years of drug and alcohol abuse, which peaked during Ween's 2011 tour. That same month, Partisan Records released Freeman's debut solo LP, Marvelous Clouds, a collection of Rod McKuen cover songs produced by Ben Vaughn.

Two months after leaving Ween, he stopped using the name Gene Ween and began performing as Aaron Freeman. In November 2013, Freeman self-released Gener's Gone: The Final Demo Recordings of Gene Ween, a six-song collection of demo tracks Freeman had previously recorded before dropping the Gene Ween moniker. The album was released digitally via Bandcamp. In 2014, Freeman formed a new five-piece band, aptly named Freeman. The band's debut, titled Freeman, was released on May 23, 2014, by Partisan Records. The second half of 2014 was spent touring alongside Arc Iris.

In 2015, Freeman returned to using the Gene Ween name for his "Gene Ween Does Billy Joel" tribute concerts. The band featured, among others, Paul Green and Dan Hickey of They Might Be Giants and performed shows in Woodstock and Brooklyn. Freeman described the return of the Gene Ween name as a positive thing:

At the end of the day, people know Gene Ween. It's not anything I should be ashamed of...I was really having an identity crisis and that happens – just what you said – so it's important to separate those things. You get lost in who you are. As I grow and get more confident in who I am and my sobriety it's like, 'Oh yeah, Gene Ween.' It's a positive thing and it represents the work I did since I was 16.

Freeman also used the Gene Ween name when he joined Umphrey's McGee onstage during their second set at the May 22, 2015 Summer Camp Music Festival. Jokingly referring to their collaboration as Godboner, Freeman and Umphrey's McGee performed a set of Ween covers, as well as "The Stranger" by Billy Joel.

On November 16, 2015, Ween announced that they would reunite for three concerts at the 1stBank Center in Broomfield, Colorado in February 2016. Ween continued to perform and tour until going on an indefinite hiatus in August 2024, citing Melchiondo's mental health as a reason. Freeman has also continued performing outside of Ween, including a 2017 tour of his Gene Ween Does Billy Joel tribute show. Freeman was scheduled to perform with Umphrey's McGee once again on June 21, 2020, until the event was cancelled as a result of the COVID-19 pandemic.

== Selected discography ==
With Ween

- GodWeenSatan: The Oneness (1990)
- The Pod (1991)
- Pure Guava (1992)
- Chocolate and Cheese (1994)
- 12 Golden Country Greats (1996)
- The Mollusk (1997)
- White Pepper (2000)
- Quebec (2003)
- Shinola, Vol. 1 (2005)
- La Cucaracha (2007)

With Z-Rock Hawaii

- Z-Rock Hawaii (1996)

With Freeman

- Freeman (2014)

Solo work

- Synthetic Socks (1987)
- Marvelous Clouds (2012) (released as Aaron Freeman)
- Gener's Gone: The Final Demo Recordings of Gene Ween (2013) (released as Aaron Freeman)
