= The Pod =

Studio album by Ween
- Released: September 20, 1991
- Recorded: January – October 1990
- Studio: The Pod (Solebury Township, Pennsylvania)
- Genres: Experimental rock; lo-fi; noise rock; outsider music; acid rock
- Length: 76:40
- Label: Shimmy-Disc
- Producer: Andrew Weiss

Ween chronology
GodWeenSatan: The Oneness (1990)	The Pod (1991)	Pure Guava (1992)

The Pod is the second studio album by American rock band Ween. It was released on September 20, 1991, by Shimmy-Disc.

== Production ==
The album was recorded from January to October 1990, at the Pod on Van Sant Road in Solebury Township, Pennsylvania. Recording concluded one month prior to the release of their debut on November 16. The album was derived from two tapes titled the Bilboa tape and the Big Timmy Wasserman tape. Both tapes contain not only demo versions of songs on the album, but many outtakes not used on any album or tracks used on future albums. All of the songs have a muddy quality to them, due to being recorded on a Tascam four-track cassette recorder, and many of the vocals are manipulated in strange ways.

== Composition ==
The album contains bizarre lyrical content, often attributed to the fact that Dean and Gene both came down with cases of mononucleosis during the recording of the album, as well as their alleged relationship with huffing Scotchgard. However, when their fans began huffing Scotchgard, it was refuted by Gene Ween and Dean Ween themselves as being "the most slime-bag thing we could think of."

Robyn Hitchcock is credited with "musical inspiration" for the track "Alone", which borrows elements from his song "Bones in the Ground".

The track "Pollo Asado" is a comedic skit with a man ordering Mexican food over music. The song was inspired by Gene Ween's time briefly working at a Mexican restaurant in New Hope, Pennsylvania.

== Title and album cover ==
The album takes its name from the band's apartment where the album was recorded, which the band nicknamed "The Pod". The album's cover art is a takeoff of the 1975 The Best of Leonard Cohen cover; Ween simply positioned a photo of part-time bassist Mean Ween's head wearing a Scotchgard powered bong (known as a “Jammy Pac”) over Cohen's cover art, and altered the title text and other graphics. The copy of the Leonard Cohen record that Ween used had purportedly belonged to Deaner's mother.

== Liner notes ==
From the Shimmy-Disc CD:

"Recorded by Dean and Gene Ween on a Tascam four-track cassette recorder between January and October 1990. All songs recorded at the Pod, where we lived for a year and 10 months (with our cat Mandee). The Pod was scenically located on Van Sant Road in Solebury Township, Pennsylvania. Our apartment was a haven for flies because it sits in the middle of a horse farm. In the time this album was completed, we filled up 3,600 hours of tape, and inhaled 5 cans of Scotchgard. This album was then produced and mixed by Andrew Weiss (our pal) at the Zion House of Flesh, Hopewell, New Jersey. Straight to DAT Mang. Mean Ween played the bass on "Alone" and that's him on the cover doin' up some Scotchguard powered bongs. We got evicted on October 1, 1991. But Dave Ayers says he's gonna help us out. Cover and art designs by Logarithms."

== Promotion ==
The Pod produced three music videos. "Pollo Asado", "Captain Fantasy", and "Pork Roll Egg and Cheese" were included on a VHS music video compilation titled Shimmy-Disc Video Volume 3. Shimmy-Disc Video was a series of VHS tapes created by Shimmy Disc containing music videos from artists who were signed to the label. These tapes were never remastered or re-released, nor were the music videos.

Shimmy-Disc released a vinyl version of The Pod in 1991. It was also remastered and reissued by Elektra Records in 1995, after the relative success of Ween albums such as Pure Guava (1992) and Chocolate and Cheese (1994).

== Reception and legacy ==
Professional ratings
Review scores
Source	Rating
AllMusic	3.5/5 stars
Robert Christgau	(dud)
The Encyclopedia of Popular Music	2/5 stars
MusicHound Rock: The Essential Album Guide	3/5 stars
The Rolling Stone Album Guide	2.5/5 stars
Spin Alternative Record Guide	5/10

In 1993, the album was named one of the 20 best albums of 1992 by Spin. Trouser Press wrote: "Less inflamed and inspired than the first album (blame, perhaps, the five cans of Scotchguard the band claims to have inhaled), The Pod lurches, howls, fuzzes and strums through sloppy creations that are mostly one hit short of a high." In a 1999 review of the album, The Stranger called it "excellent" and wrote that "someday, classical music students will write dissertations on The Pod." Kerrang! wrote that "the electrified production on tracks like 'Dr. Rock' and 'Sketches of Winkle' is utterly unhinged, while the barking, aimless pace of 'The Stallion' (either part, really) feels like the sweaty blatherings of the most poisonous of drunks."

In a September 1992 Spin interview, Faith No More singer Mike Patton mentioned it as one of his favorite albums, and around this time his band also did live covers of the Pure Guava track "The Goin' Gets Tough From the Getgo". In later years, Aphex Twin named it one of his 10 favorite albums of all time (making it one of two Ween albums on the list, the other being Pure Guava).

== Track listing ==
All tracks are written by Ween.

No.	Title	Lead vocals	Length
1.	"Strap on That Jammy Pac"	Melchiondo	3:03
2.	"Dr. Rock"	Freeman with Melchiondo	3:11
3.	"Frank"	Freeman and Melchiondo	3:46
4.	"Sorry Charlie"	Melchiondo	3:51
5.	"The Stallion (Pt. 1)"	Freeman	2:51
6.	"Pollo Asado"	Freeman	2:45
7.	"Right to the Ways and the Rules of the World"	Freeman with Melchiondo	5:05
8.	"Captain Fantasy"	Freeman	3:19
9.	"Demon Sweat"	Freeman	4:11
10.	"Molly"	Freeman and Melchiondo	4:49
11.	"Can U Taste the Waste?"	Freeman	1:39
12.	"Don't Sweat It"	Freeman	4:02
13.	"Awesome Sound"	Melchiondo	2:22
14.	"Laura"	Freeman	4:37
15.	"Boing"	Freeman	1:33
16.	"Mononucleosis"	Freeman	3:01
17.	"Oh My Dear (Falling in Love)"	Freeman	1:57
18.	"Sketches of Winkle"	Freeman	2:44
19.	"Alone"	Melchiondo	3:12
20.	"Moving Away"	Freeman	3:06
21.	"She Fucks Me"	Melchiondo with Freeman	3:59
22.	"Pork Roll Egg and Cheese"	Freeman	3:02
23.	"The Stallion (Pt. 2)"	Freeman	4:35
Total length:			76:40

== Personnel ==
Ween

- Dean Ween – vocals, acoustic & electric guitar, bass guitar, keyboards, drum machine
- Gene Ween – vocals, acoustic guitar

Additional musicians

- Mean Ween - bass guitar on “Alone”

Technical

- Dean Ween – engineer, art direction
- Gene Ween – engineer, art direction
- Andrew Weiss – producer, mixing
- Michael McGrath – art direction
- Logorythms – cover art, design
- Howie Weinberg – remastering
- Mean Ween - cover model
