= Dean Ween =

American rock musician

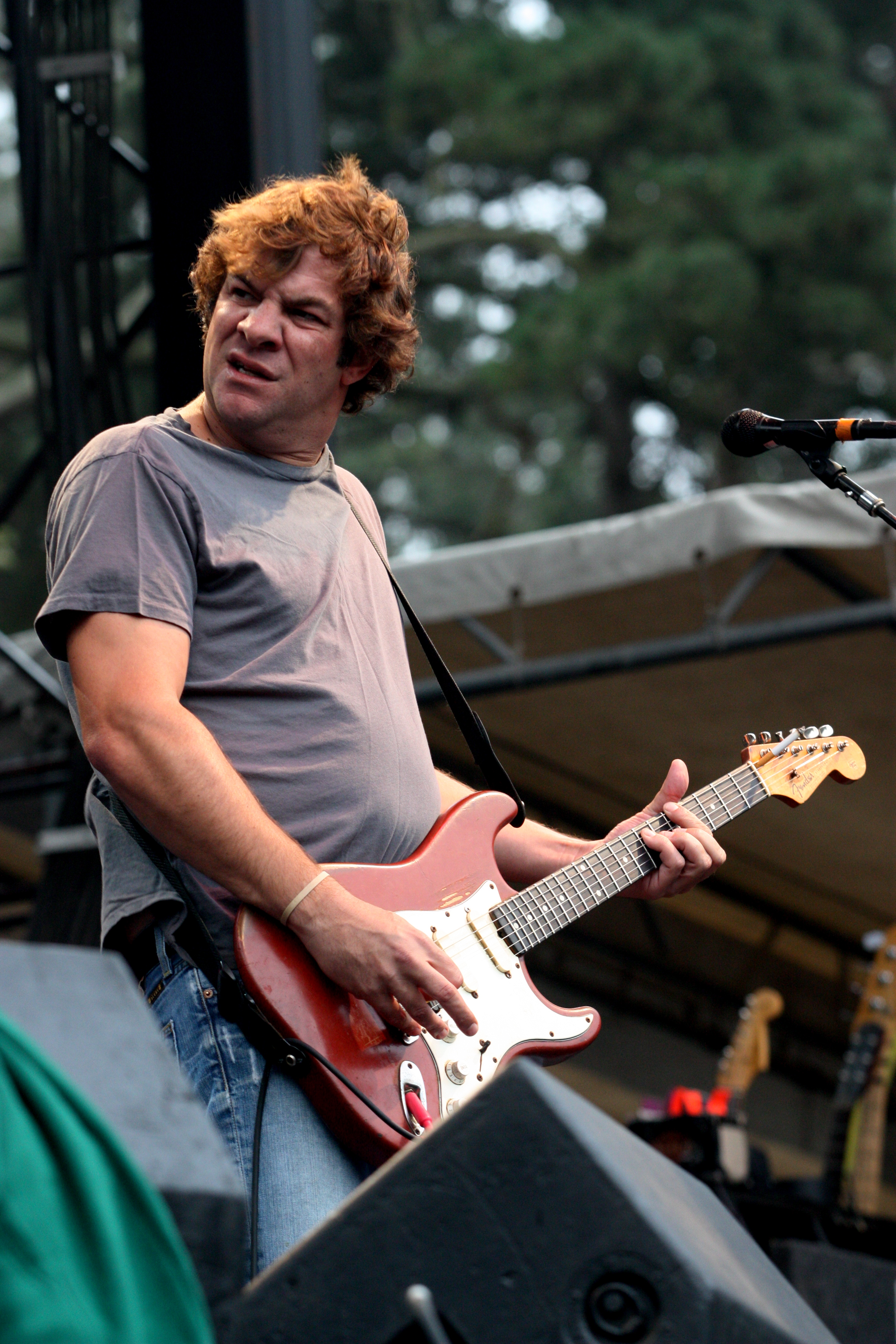
- Dean Ween performing with Ween in 2009
- Born: Michael Melchiondo Jr. September 25, 1970 (age 56); Trenton, New Jersey, U.S.
- Other names: Deaner; Mickey Moist; Mickey Melchiondo
- Occupations: Singer; musician; songwriter; record producer
- Years active: 1984–present
- Children: 1
- Musical career
- Genres: Alternative rock; experimental rock; neo-psychedelia; hard rock; lo-fi; funk; country rock
- Instruments: Vocals; guitar; bass; keyboards; drums
- Labels: Twin/Tone; Shimmy-Disc; Elektra; Chocodog Records; Rhino
- Member of: Ween; Moistboyz; Dean Ween Group
- Formerly of: Z-Rock Hawaii
- Website: ween.com

Michael "Mickey" Melchiondo Jr. (born September 25, 1970), better known by his stage name Dean Ween, is an American guitarist, singer and a founding member of the alternative rock group Ween. He is currently active in the groups Ween, Moistboyz and The Dean Ween Group.

== Biography ==
In 1984, Melchiondo met Aaron Freeman in a junior high school typing class, in their hometown of New Hope, Pennsylvania. The two adopted the fictitious surname Ween after the demon-god Boognish appeared to them, with Melchiondo taking up the name Dean Ween and Freeman the name Gene Ween.

In 1991, Melchiondo formed the punk rock duo Moistboyz with Guy Heller. Moistboyz have released five eponymous studio recordings.

Melchiondo made contributions to two projects by his friend Josh Homme: The Desert Sessions and Queens of the Stone Age. On the 2002 Queens of the Stone Age album Songs for the Deaf, Melchiondo played guitar on "No One Knows", "Mosquito Song", "Gonna Leave You", and "Six Shooter".

In 2009 Melchiondo received his captain's license and regularly leads fishing trips off the Jersey Shore as Mickey's Guide Service.

In 2012, in the wake of Ween's breakup, Melchiondo formed The Dean Ween Group. In August 2016, the Dean Ween Group's debut album, The Deaner Album, was announced with the release of the first track entitled "Mercedes Benz". On October 7, 2016, Melchiondo's first-ever solo music video was released for the song "Exercise Man", the music video was directed by Monica Hampton. "The Deaner Album" was subsequently released on October 21, 2016, through ATO Records. Melchiondo's second solo album under The Dean Ween Group moniker, rock2, was released on March 16, 2018.

== Discography ==
with Ween

- GodWeenSatan: The Oneness (1990)
- The Pod (1991)
- Pure Guava (1992)
- Chocolate and Cheese (1994)
- 12 Golden Country Greats (1996)
- The Mollusk (1997)
- White Pepper (2000)
- Quebec (2003)
- Shinola Vol. 1 (2005)
- La Cucaracha (2007)

with Moistboyz

- Moistboyz (1994)
- Moistboyz II (1996)
- Moistboyz III (2002)
- Moistboyz IV (2005)
- Moistboyz V (2013)

with Z-Rock Hawaii

- Z-Rock Hawaii (1996)

with The Dean Ween Group

- The Deaner Album (2016)
- rock2 (2018)

== Other projects and appearances ==
Year	Title	Label
1993	En Esch – Cheesy	TVT Records
1995	Frente! - Lonely	White
1995	Kostars – Klassics With a 'K	Grand Royal
1996	Yoko Ono – Rising Mixes	Capitol Records
1996	Ben Vaughn – Instrumental Stylings	Bar None Records
1998	Hub – Hub	Slash Records
1999	Ben – Wool	Ben Chatrer
2001	Pigface – Preaching to the Perverted	Invisible Records
2002	Ben – I Am a Monster	Ben Chatrer
2002	Rollins Band – Rise Above: 24 Black Flag Songs to Benefit the West Memphis Three	Sanctuary Records
2002	Queens of the Stone Age – Songs for the Deaf	Interscope Records
2003	Desert Sessions – Volumes 9 & 10	Ipecac Recordings/Rekords Rekords
2005	Chris Harford – Looking Out For Number 6	Chocodog Records
2011	Ben – Bath	Ben Chatrer
2014	Nick Oliveri's Uncontrollable – Leave Me Alone	Schnitzel Records
2019	Solid Bronze- "The Fruit Basket"	Schnitzel Records
2020	Ben Chatrer - What Have I Done!/ I Am A Monster	Captured Tracks
2022	Thoughts & Prayers - “Humboldt County” Featuring (Jess Margera)	Filthy Note
