= New Hope-Solebury High School =

Coordinates: 40.3656°N 74.9591°W

- 182 W Bridge St; New Hope, Pennsylvania, PA 18938; United States

Information
- School type: Public
- School district: New Hope-Solebury School District
- Superintendent: Charles Lentz
- NCES School ID: 421686001084
- Principal: Patrick Sasse
- Teaching staff: 41.45 (FTE)
- Grades: 9-12
- Enrollment: 447 (2023–2024)
- Student to teacher ratio: 10.78
- Schedule type: Block
- Colors: Royal Blue, Gold
- Athletics: PIAA
- Mascot: Lions
- Graduates (2023): 117
- Website: https://www.nhsd.org/o/nhshs

New Hope-Solebury High School is a public high school located in New Hope, Bucks County, Pennsylvania. The school houses grades 9 through 12 and is the only public high school located in the New Hope-Solebury School District. The school's mascot is the Lion, and its colors are royal blue and gold. Students are largely received from New Hope-Solebury Middle School, which is on the same campus as New Hope-Solebury High School. As of the 2022–23 school year, the school has 445 students. In 2024, the high school was ranked fifteenth-best in the state of Pennsylvania by the U.S. News & World Report. Patrick Sasse is the current principal of New Hope-Solebury High School.

== Student body ==
As of the 2022–23 school year, 13.7% of students are considered economically disadvantaged, 10.8% are in special education, and 9.4% are in gifted education. A total of 43 students are free or reduced lunch price eligible. The student teacher ratio is 10.87.

Group	Number of students	Percent
All	445	100%
White	347	78.0%
Black	0	0.0%
Asian	26	5.8%
Hispanic	36	8.1%
American Indian or Alaska Native	1	0.2%
Native Hawaiian or other Pacific Islander	1	0.2%
Two or More Races	34	7.6%
Male	221	49.7%
Female	224	50.3%

== Academics ==
New Hope-Solebury High School is divided into departments for mathematics, science, social studies/history, foreign languages (Spanish and French), English, fine arts, business education, gifted students, health and physical education, information technology, and practical arts technology. As of 2024, Advanced Placement (AP) Courses are offered in at least nineteen subjects.

For the 2022–23 school year, the average SAT score for New Hope-Solebury students was 613 for reading and 616 for math. The average ACT score for the 2022–23 school year was 25. New Hope-Solebury High School weighs Honors and AP classes above their unweighted 4.0 GPA scale. The 50th percentile unweighted GPA for the graduating class of 2023 was 3.737.

New Hope-Solebury High School was rated the second-best high school in Pennsylvania by U.S. News & World Report in 2015, 2016, and 2017. In 2024, they were ranked the 15th-best high school in Pennsylvania, the highest out of all public high schools in Bucks County.

Students also may take courses at Middle Bucks Institute of Technology, offering them more vocational based educations.

== Performing arts ==
New Hope-Solebury High School's band, orchestra, and choir programs are open to students in all grade levels. The programs give concerts several times every year. Select groups have performed in San Francisco, Toronto, Hersheypark, Chicago, Nashville, London, Paris, Philadelphia, Disney World, Disneyland, and Dorney Park & Wildwater Kingdom. At several of these locations, they played in competitions, and their performances resulted in several awards. In 2012, the orchestra played at the White House in Washington, D.C. In 2018, the orchestra played at Carnegie Hall in New York City. In 2019, they played in Italy at several locations. In December 2021, the orchestra, band, and choir traveled to Hawaii to participate in the Pearl Harbor Memorial Parade.

The Stephen J. Buck auditorium houses roughly 500 people and is used for theater productions; band, choir, and orchestra concerts; assemblies, community town halls, club meetings, and class meetings.

== Activities ==
The school has a selection of student clubs and extracurricular activities, notable examples including Model United Nations, Future Business Leaders of America, and National Honors Society.

New Hope-Solebury High School sports are governed by the Pennsylvania Interscholastic Athletic Association (PIAA). In 2019, the school joined the localized Suburban One League.

The school competes in varsity and junior varsity cross country, golf, field hockey, volleyball, soccer, basketball, wrestling, baseball, football, softball, lacrosse, tennis, bocce, and track. The school also competes in PIAA-affiliated esports.

In 2010, the boys' soccer team won the PIAA State Finals, after beating the Mercyhurst Prep team with a score of 2–1. In 2011, the boys' soccer team won the PIAA State Finals again, beating Mercyhurst Prep 3–2. The boys' soccer team came 2nd in the PIAA State Finals in 2006 and 2019.

The boys' golf team won the state golf finals in 2014 and came 2nd in the state finals in 2015. The boys' baseball team made it the PIAA state final tournament in 2010.

== Notable alumni ==
- Aaron Freeman (Gene Ween), founding member of alternative rock group Ween
- Mickey Melchiondo (Dean Ween), founding member of alternative rock group Ween
