= Robert Beck =

Robert or Bob Beck may refer to:

- Bob Beck (1944–2008), Guamanian zoologist and conservationist
- Robert Beck (actor) (born 1968), British television actor
- Robert Beck (painter) (born 1950), American painter
- Robert Beck (pentathlete) (1936–2020), American pentathlete
- Robert Beck or Iceberg Slim (1918–1992), writer and former pimp
- Robert F. Beck (born 1943), professor of naval architecture and marine engineering at the University of Michigan
- Robert J. Beck (born 1961), scholar of international law and international relations
- Robert Nason Beck (1928–2008), pioneer radiologist
- Robert K. Beck (1915–2004), American politician and newspaper publisher
