= Joe Pickett =

Joe or Joseph Pickett may refer to:

- Joe Pickett (politician) (born 1956), American politician from the state of Texas
- Joseph Pickett (painter), American painter
- Joe Pickett, a fictional character in the eponymous series of novels by C. J. Box
  - Joe Pickett (TV series), a 2021 American television series based on the novels
