= Cintra (New Hope, Pennsylvania) =

Historic house in Pennsylvania, United States

- Formerly listed on the U.S. National Register of Historic Places
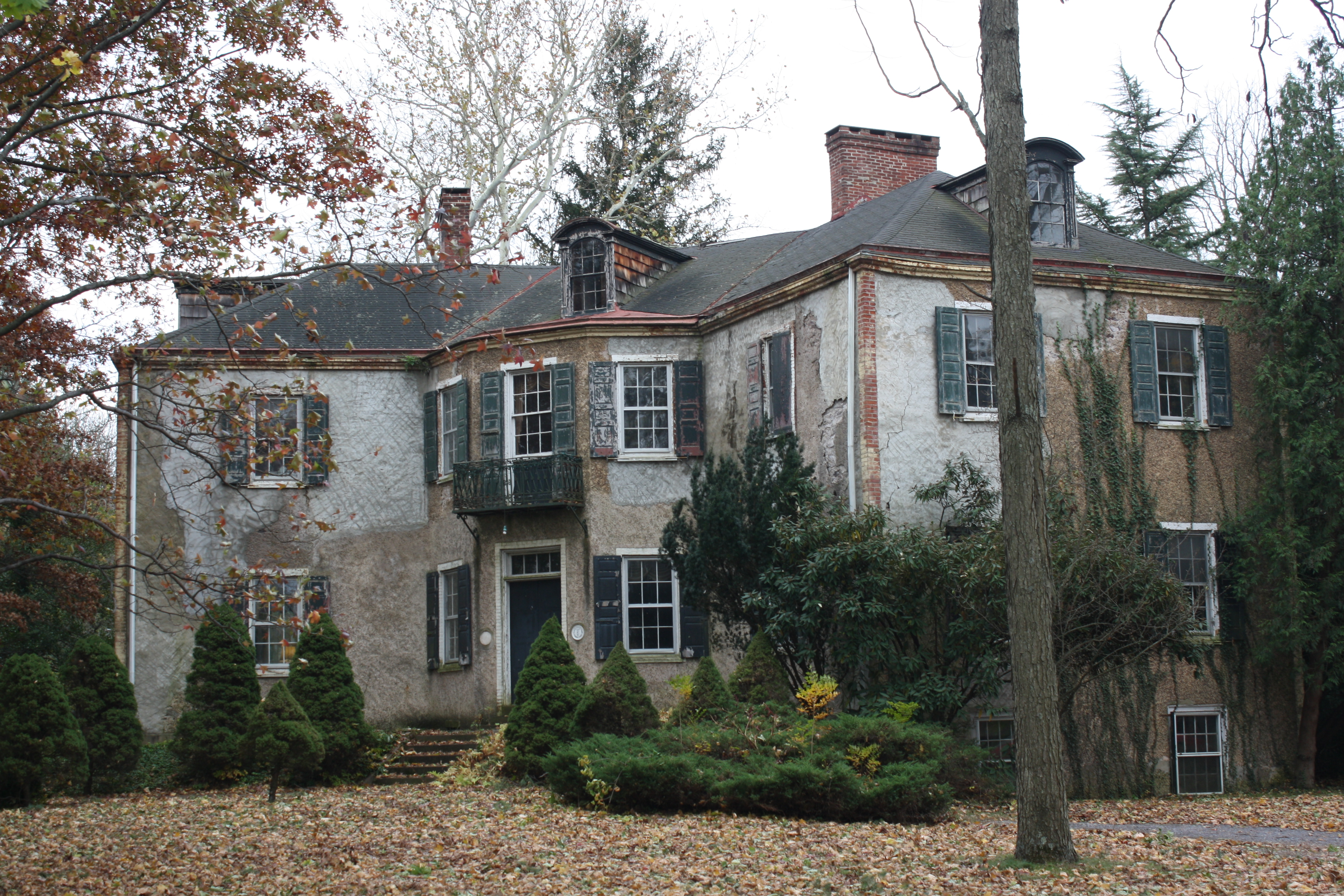
- Cintra. November 2012.

- Location within Pennsylvania Location within the United States
- Location: 181 W. Bridge St., New Hope, Pennsylvania
- Coordinates: 40°21′50.9″N 74°57′33.4″W
- Area: 4.6 acres (1.9 ha)
- Built: 1824
- MPS: New Hope MRA
- NRHP reference No.: 85000460

Significant dates
- Added to NRHP: March 6, 1985
- Removed from NRHP: December 29, 2025

Cintra was a historic home located at New Hope, Bucks County, Pennsylvania. The house was built in 1824, and was a 2 1/2-story, L-shaped, stuccoed stone dwelling with a hipped roof. It had a central hub flanked by two identical wings, and is said to have been designed after a Portuguese palace.

It was added to the National Register of Historic Places in 1985. It was demolished in 2023.
