= New Hope Village District =

Historic district in Pennsylvania, United States

- U.S. National Register of Historic Places
- U.S. Historic district
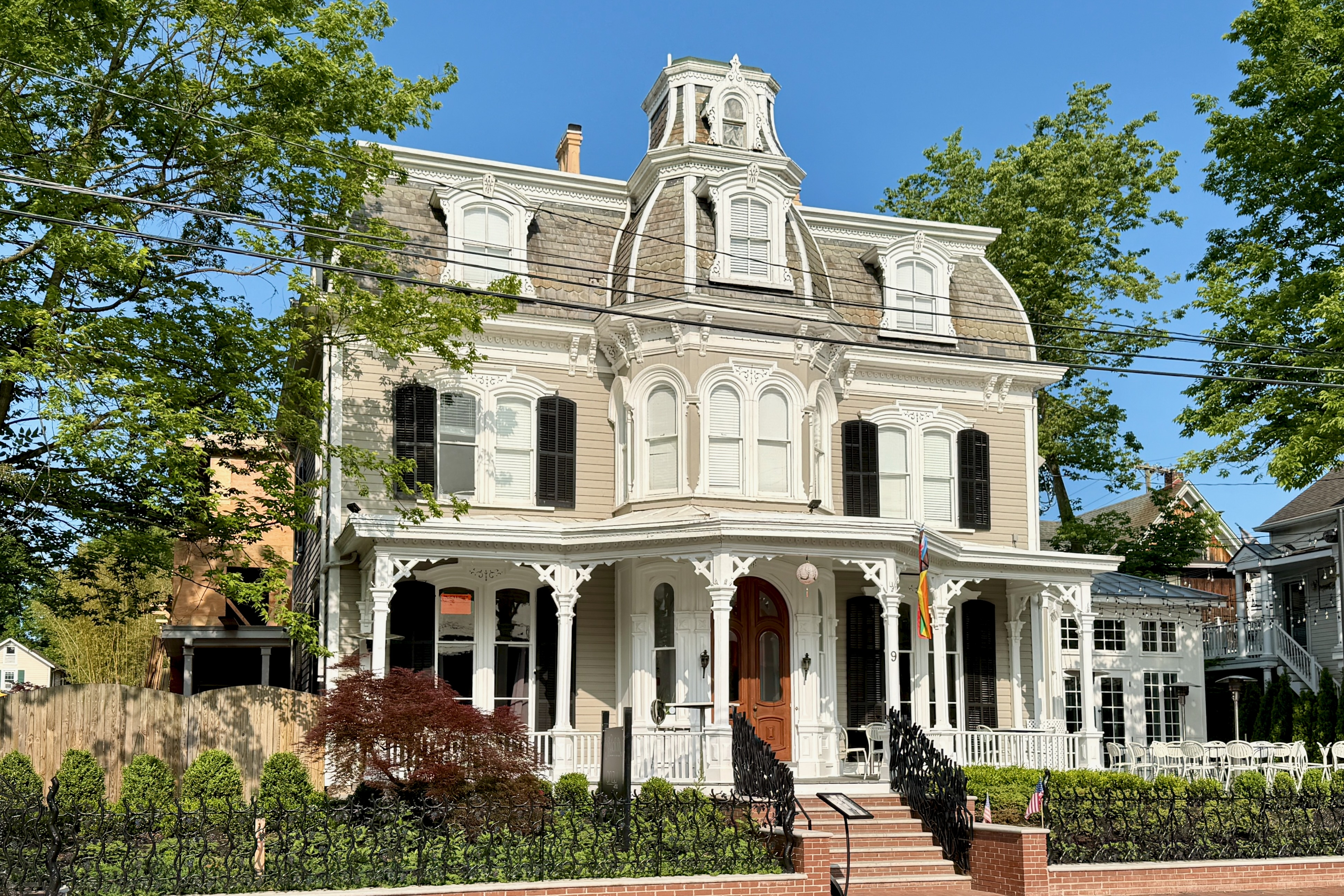
- The Mansion Inn, also known as the Cook House

- Location within Pennsylvania Location within the United States
- Location: Old Mill Rd., Stockton Ave., Ferry, Bridge, Mechanic, Randolph, Main, Coryell, and Waterloo Sts., New Hope, Pennsylvania
- Coordinates: 40°21′30″N 74°57′09″W
- Area: 95 acres (38 ha)
- Architect: Multiple
- Architectural style: Late 19th And 20th Century Revivals, Late Victorian, Federal
- MPS: New Hope MRA
- NRHP reference No.: 85000462
- Added to NRHP: March 6, 1985

The New Hope Village District, also known as New Hope M.R.A. District No. 1, is a national historic district that is located in the borough of New Hope in Bucks County, Pennsylvania. It was added to the National Register of Historic Places on March 6, 1985, for its significance in architecture, industry, and transportation.

== History and architectural features ==
This district includes 202 contributing buildings that are located in the borough of New Hope. They are primarily residential and commercial buildings, some of which date to the early-eighteenth century. Many were designed in the Late Victorian or Federal styles. Notable buildings include the Parry Mansion (1784), the Bucks County Playhouse, the Wilkinson House, the Logan Inn (1727), the Delaware House (1818), the Chattels Lumber Yard Office Building (c. 1845), the Cook House (1869), the Johnson Store (c. 1871), the Northeast Pennsylvania Railroad Station (1891), a firehouse (1908), and the Cryer Hardware Store (1849). The Northeast Pennsylvania Railroad Station is used as a terminus for the New Hope and Ivyland Railroad.

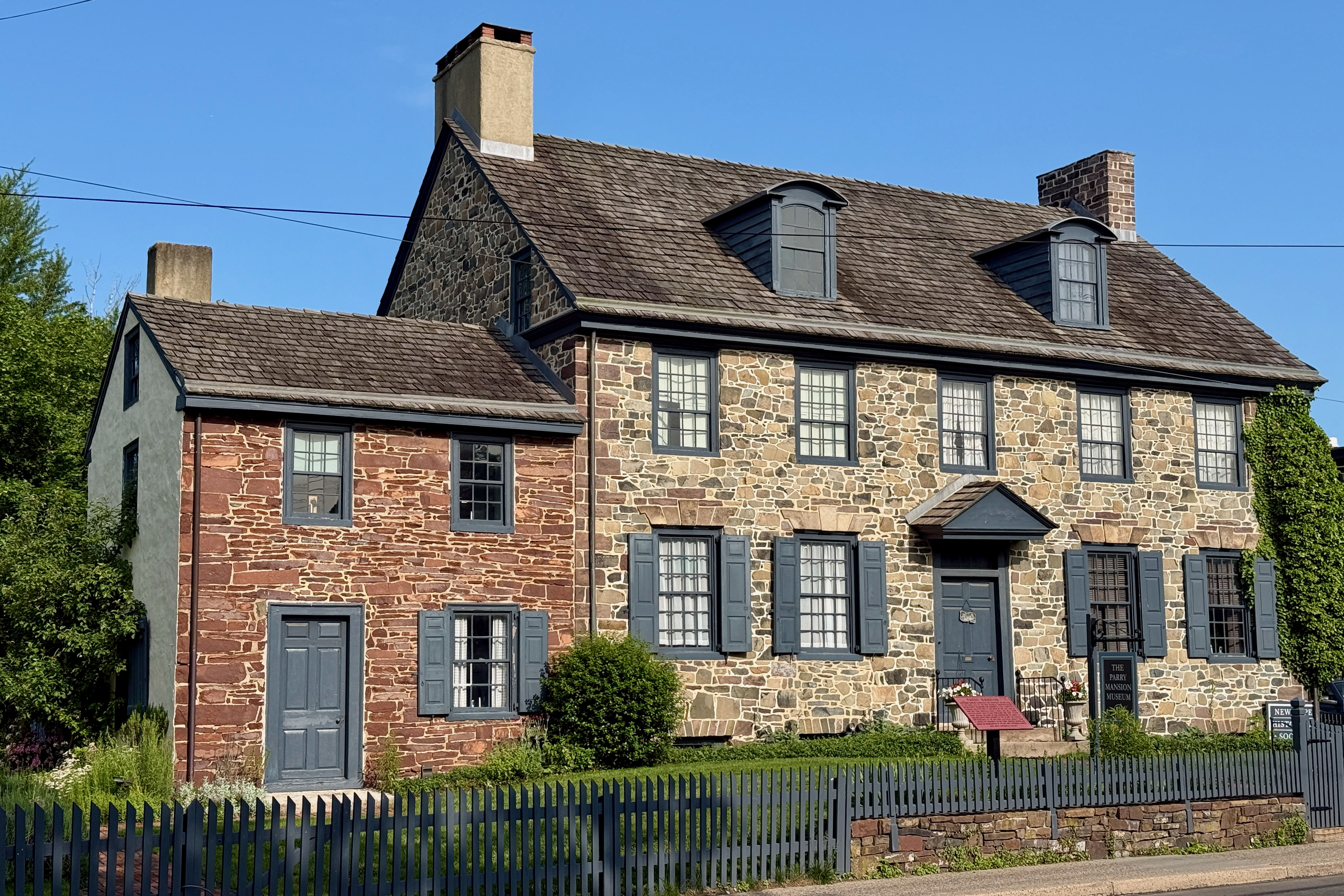
Parry Mansion

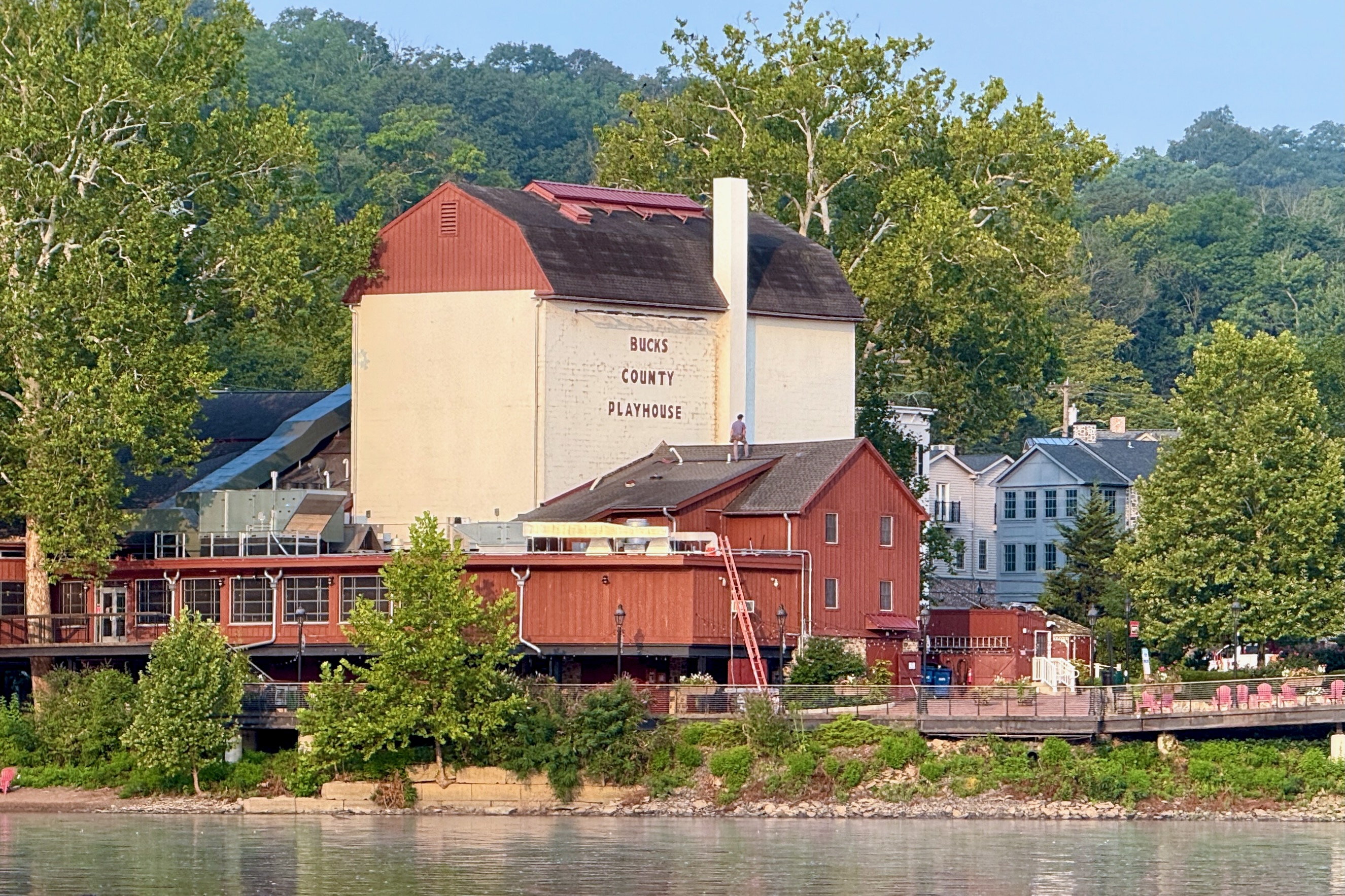
Bucks County Playhouse

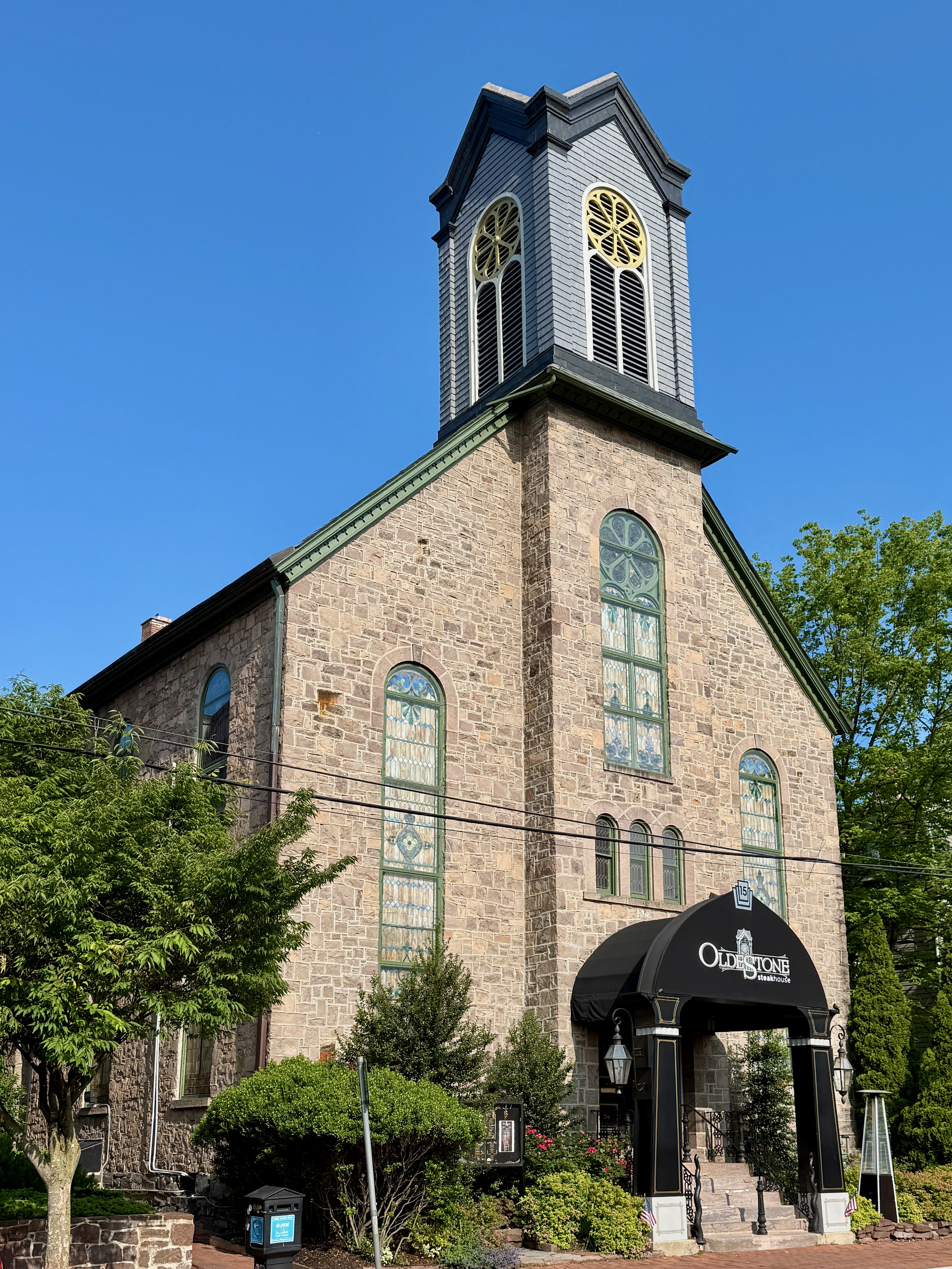
Formerly the New Hope Methodist Episcopal Church

== See also ==
- National Register of Historic Places listings in Bucks County, Pennsylvania
