= Springdale Historic District (New Hope, Pennsylvania) =

Historic district in Pennsylvania, United States

- U.S. National Register of Historic Places
- U.S. Historic district
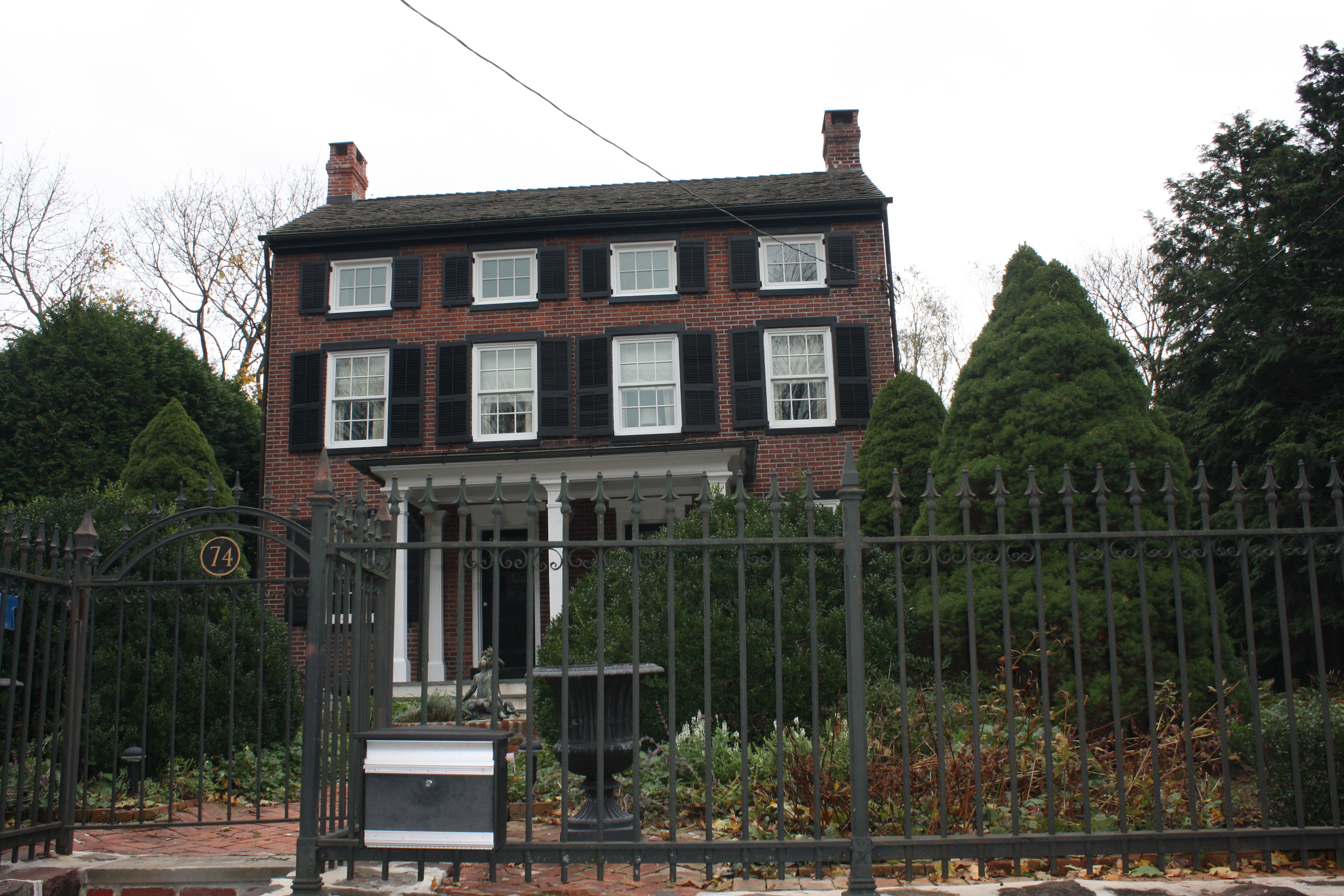
- Springdale Historic District, Hartman House. November 2012.

- Location within Pennsylvania Location within the United States
- Location: Mechanic St., Old York, S. Sugan, and Stoney Hill Rds., New Hope, Pennsylvania
- Coordinates: 40°21′43″N 74°57′50″W
- Area: 25.3 acres (10.2 ha)
- Architect: Maris, William
- MPS: New Hope MRA
- NRHP reference No.: 85000461
- Added to NRHP: March 6, 1985

The Springdale Historic District is a national historic district that is located in New Hope, Bucks County, Pennsylvania.

It was added to the National Register of Historic Places in 1985.

== History and architectural features ==
This district includes twenty-nine contributing buildings that are located in a rural industrial area in the borough of New Hope. Notable buildings include the Heath House/Huffnagle-Hood Mansion and grist mill, the James Magill House (1790), a three-story stone textile mill, the Conrad Hartman Store (c. 1820), and small single-family dwellings for Black and unskilled laborers.

== Gallery ==
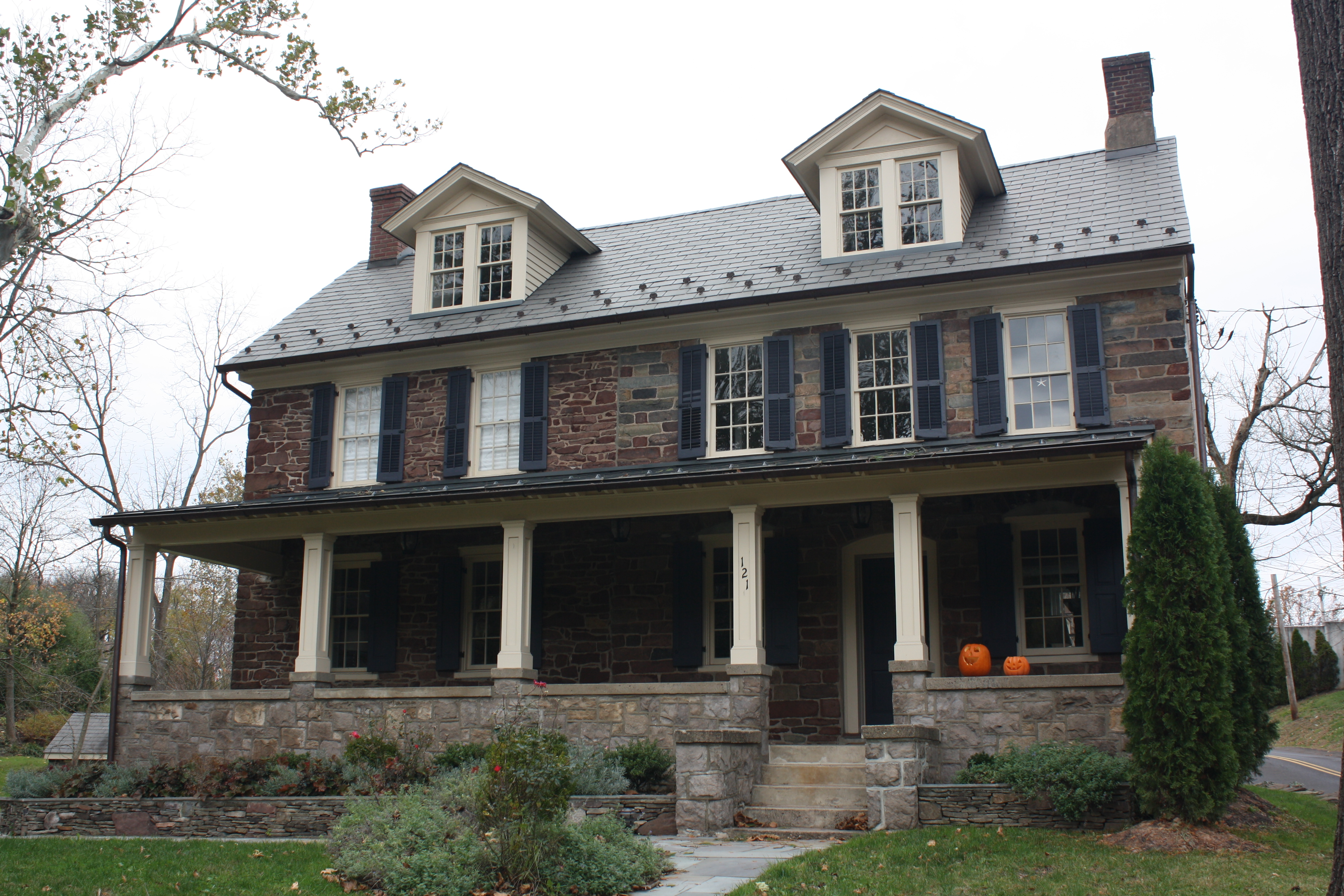

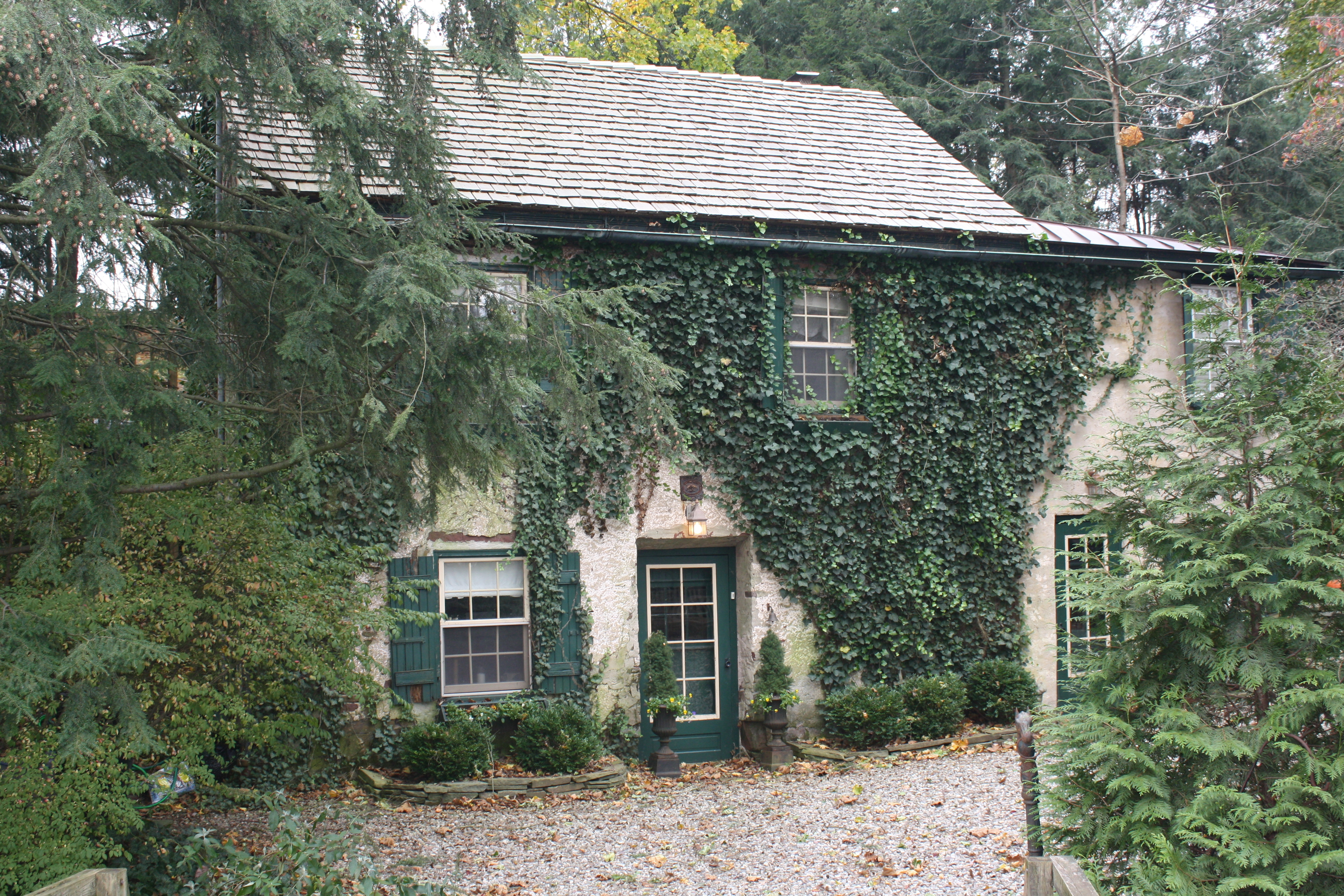

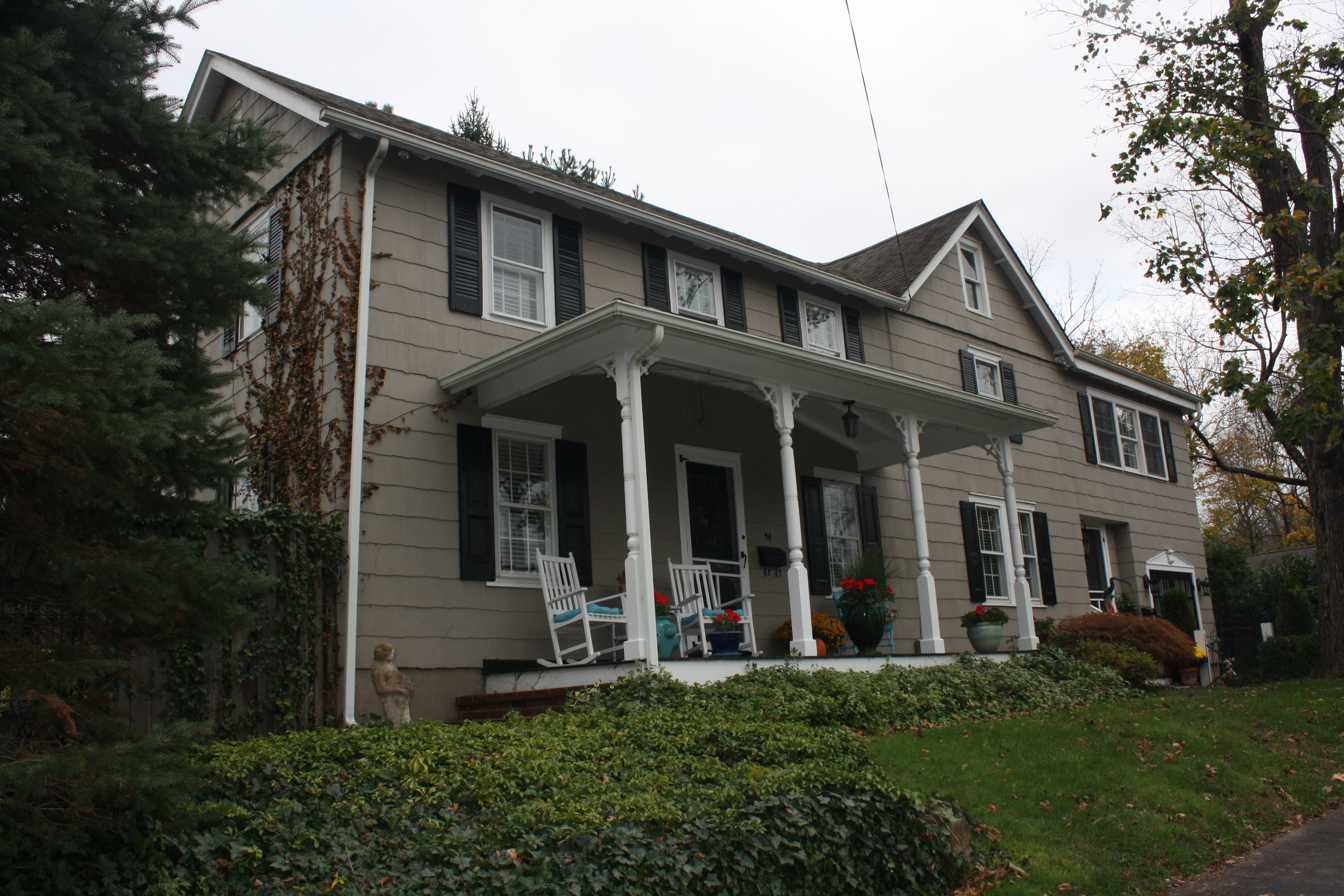

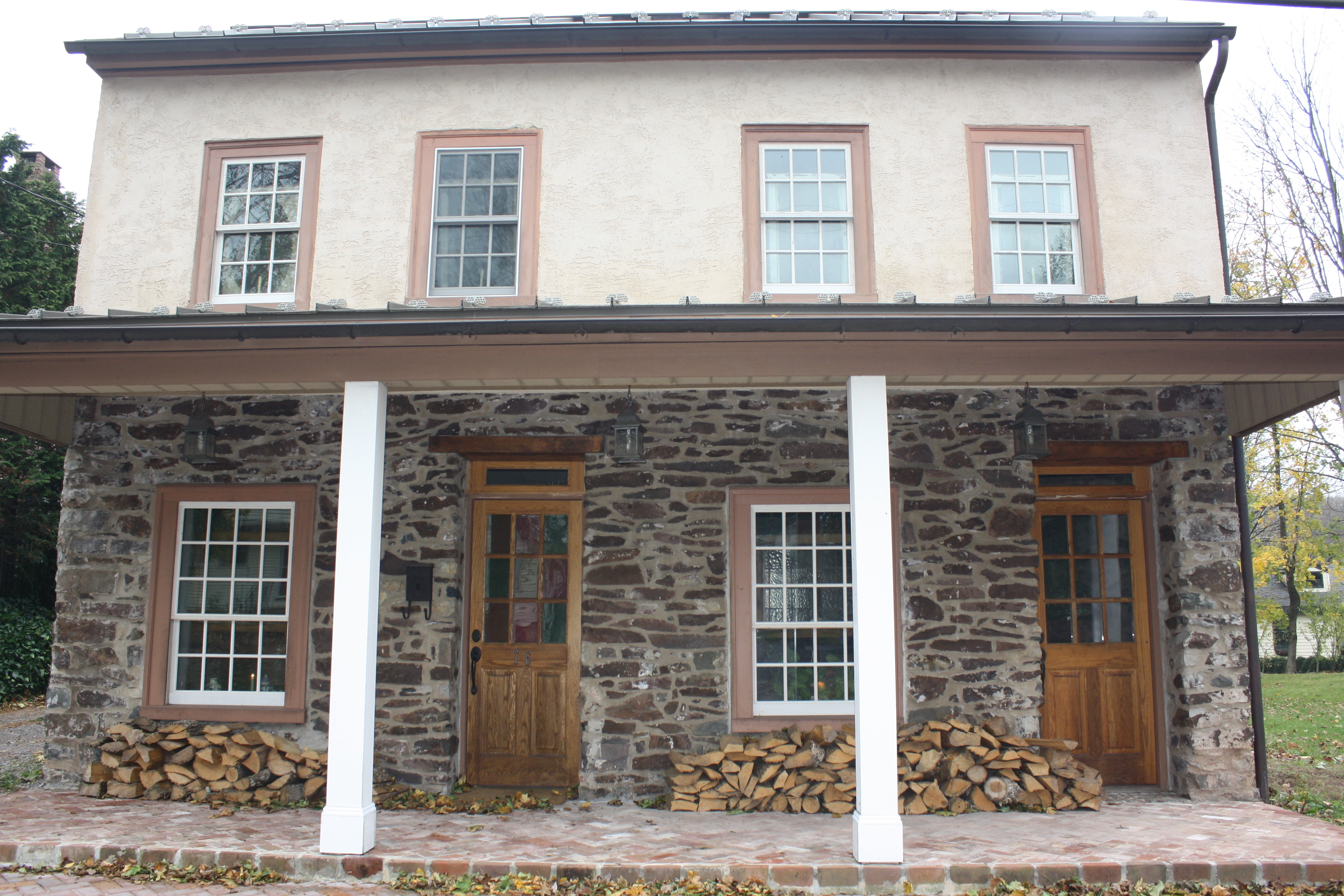

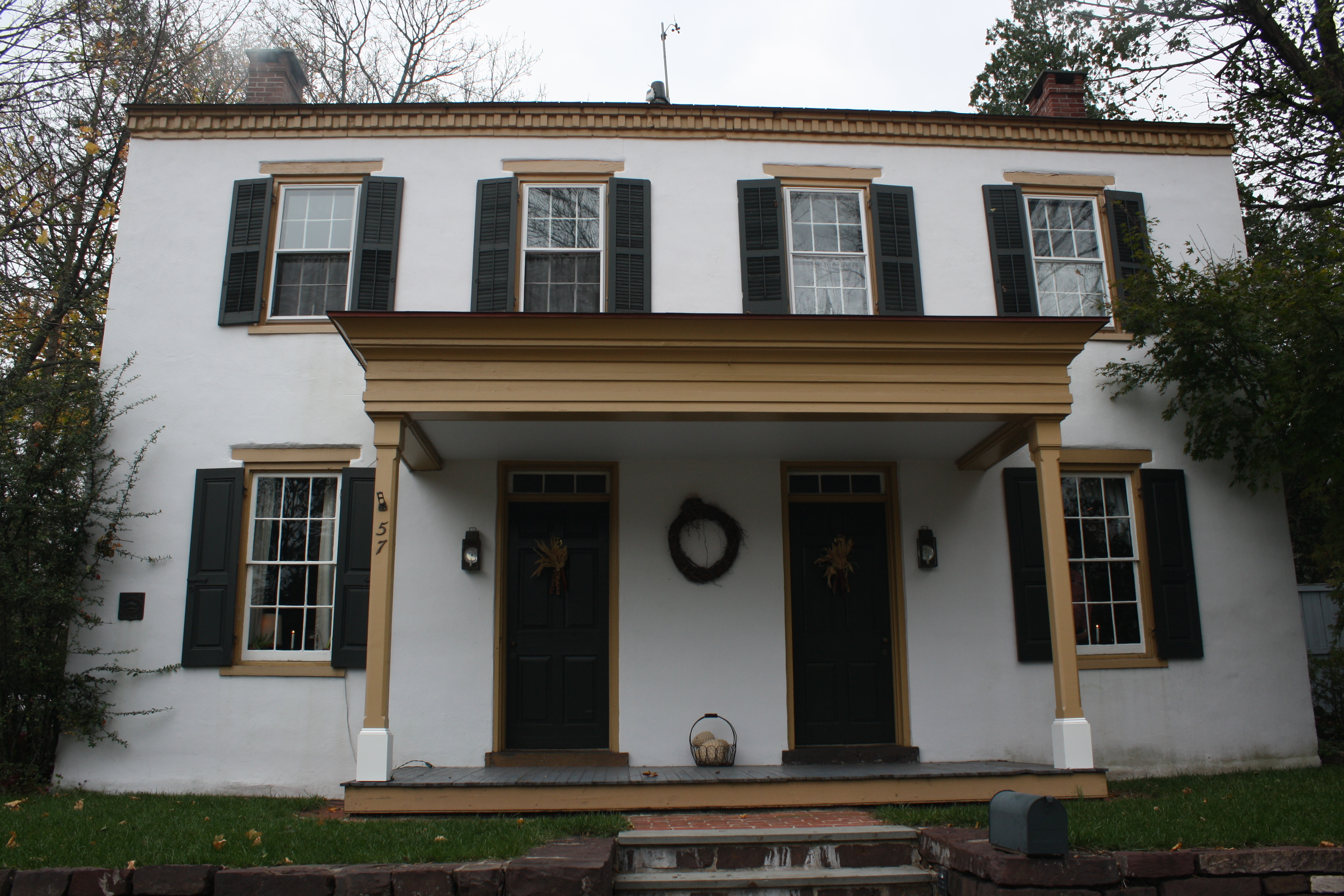
