= Rhoads Homestead =

Historic house in Pennsylvania, United States

- U.S. National Register of Historic Places
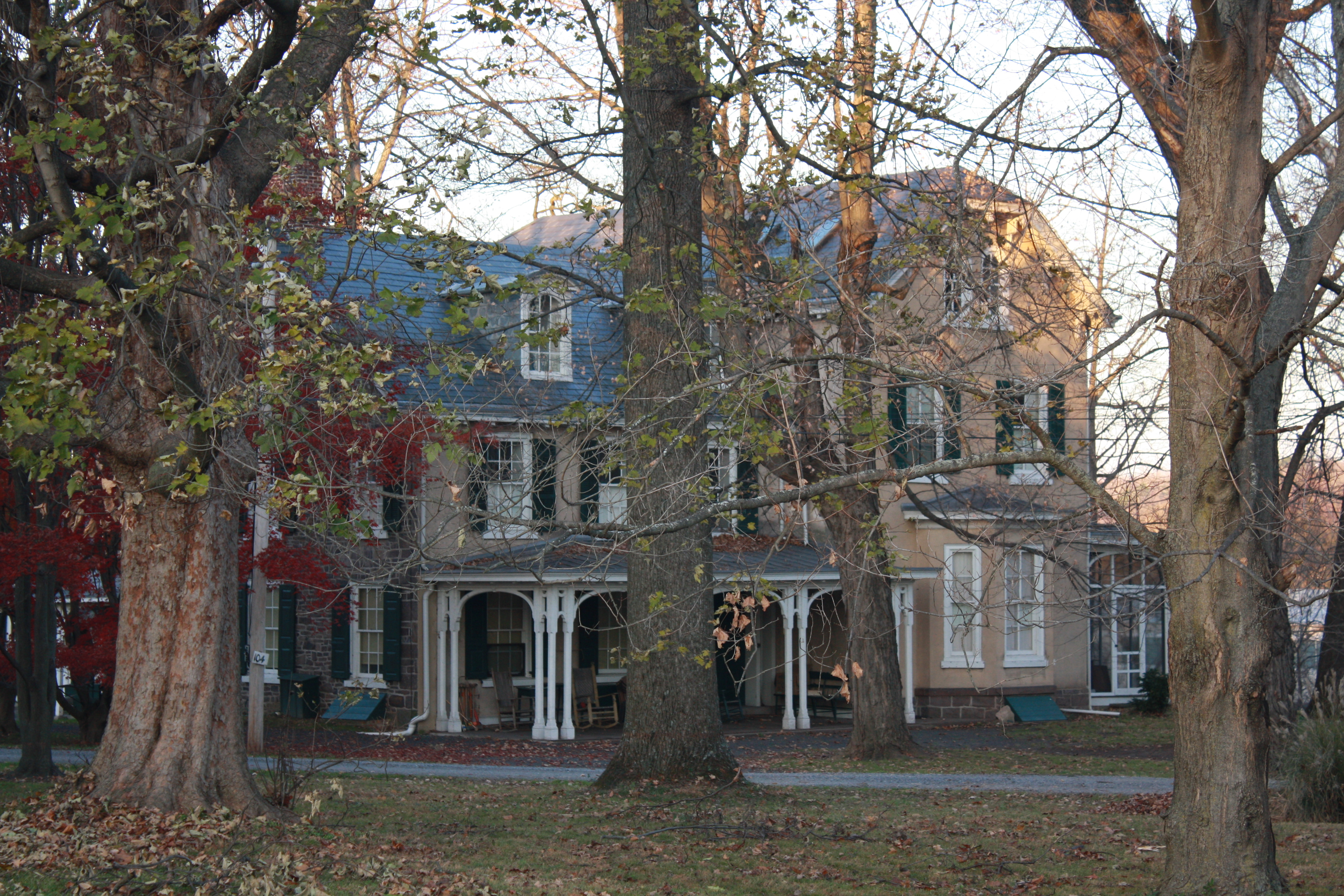
- Rhoads Homestead Farmhouse. November 2012.

- Location within Pennsylvania Location within the United States
- Location: 102-106 W. Bridge St., New Hope, Pennsylvania
- Coordinates: 40°21′57.4″N 74°57′23.1″W
- Area: 60.1 acres (24.3 ha)
- Built: 1734, 1760, 1776, 1858
- MPS: New Hope MRA
- NRHP reference No.: 85003655
- Added to NRHP: August 8, 1996

The Rhoads Homestead is an historic homestead in New Hope, Bucks County, Pennsylvania, United States.

It was added to the National Register of Historic Places in 1983.

== History and architectural features ==
The farmhouse consists of two sections; the oldest was built circa 1734. The first section is a 2 1/2-story, fieldstone structure with an attached, one-story, sloped-roof, fieldstone addition. A second house dates to 1760 and is a 2 1/2-story, fieldstone dwelling that was remodeled during the nineteenth century in the Victorian style. It has a two-story, stone addition and a one-story board-and-batten addition.

Associated with this house are stone spring houses, board-and-batten woodsheds, a clapboard pump shelter, and the ruins of a small bank barn. The third house was built in 1858 and is a small 2 1/2-story, board-and-batten dwelling that was built to house servants.

This homestead was the site of General William Alexander's three week bivouac prior to the Battle of Trenton from December 8 through December 25, 1776.

== Gallery ==
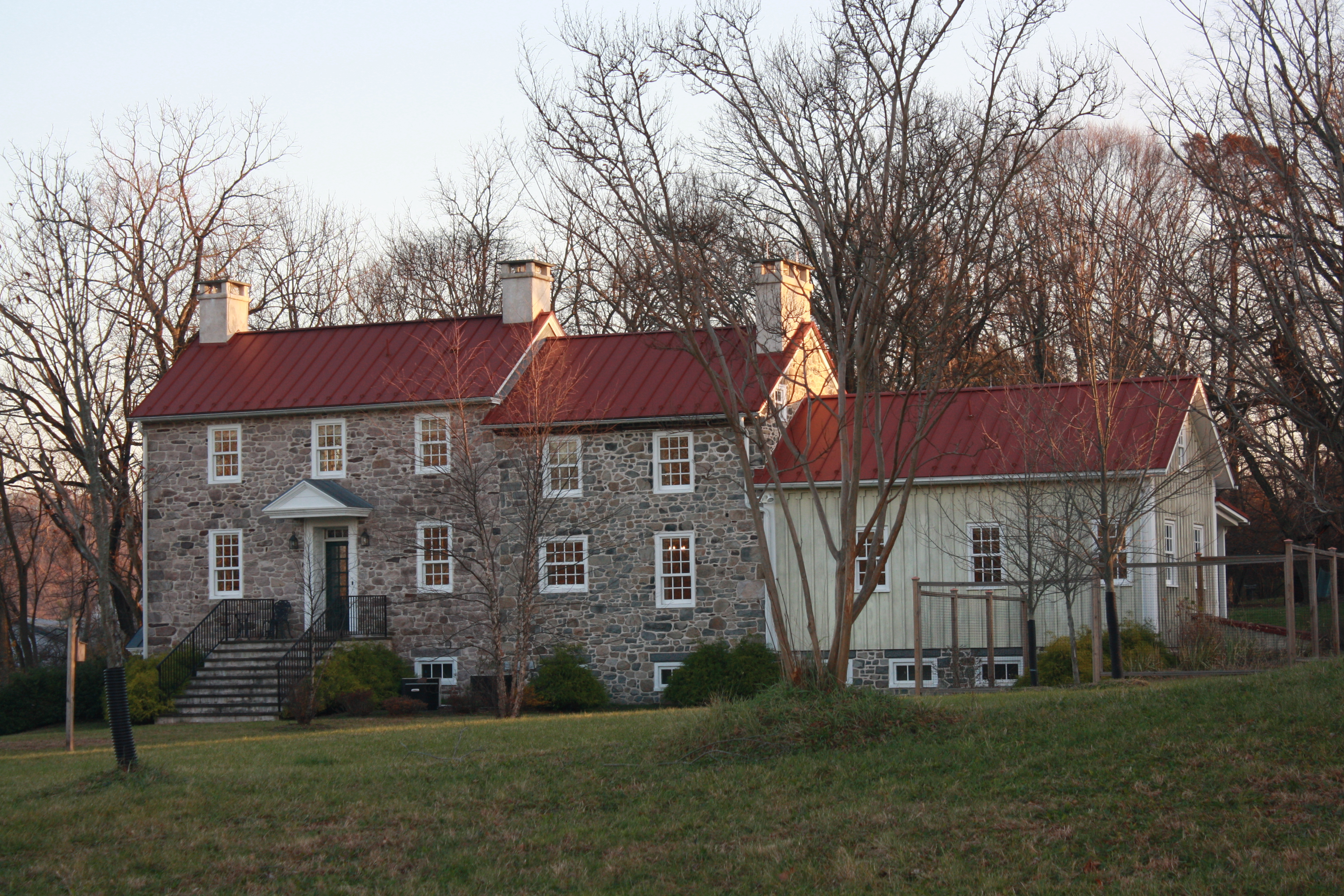
Second House (1760).

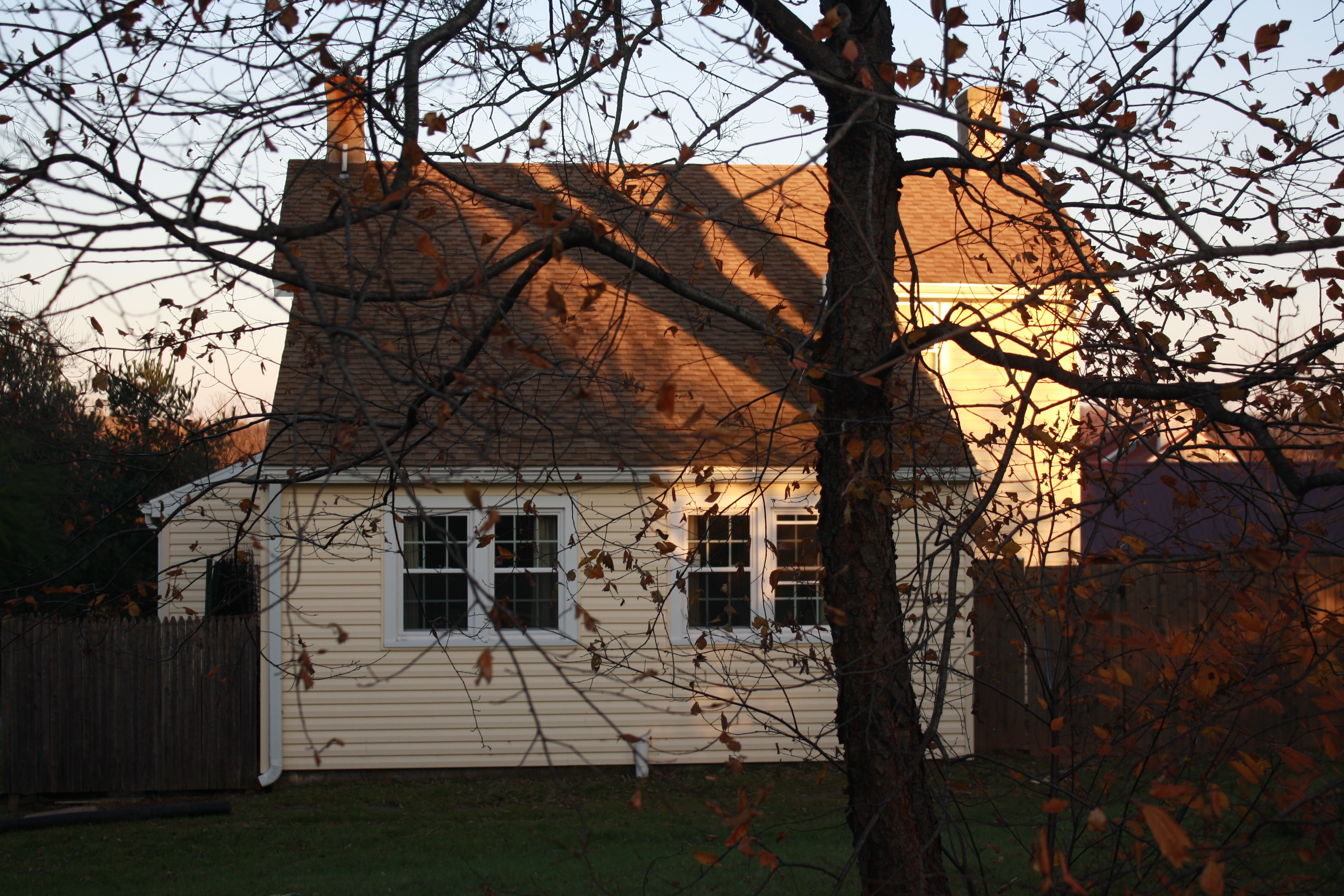
House for servants (1858).

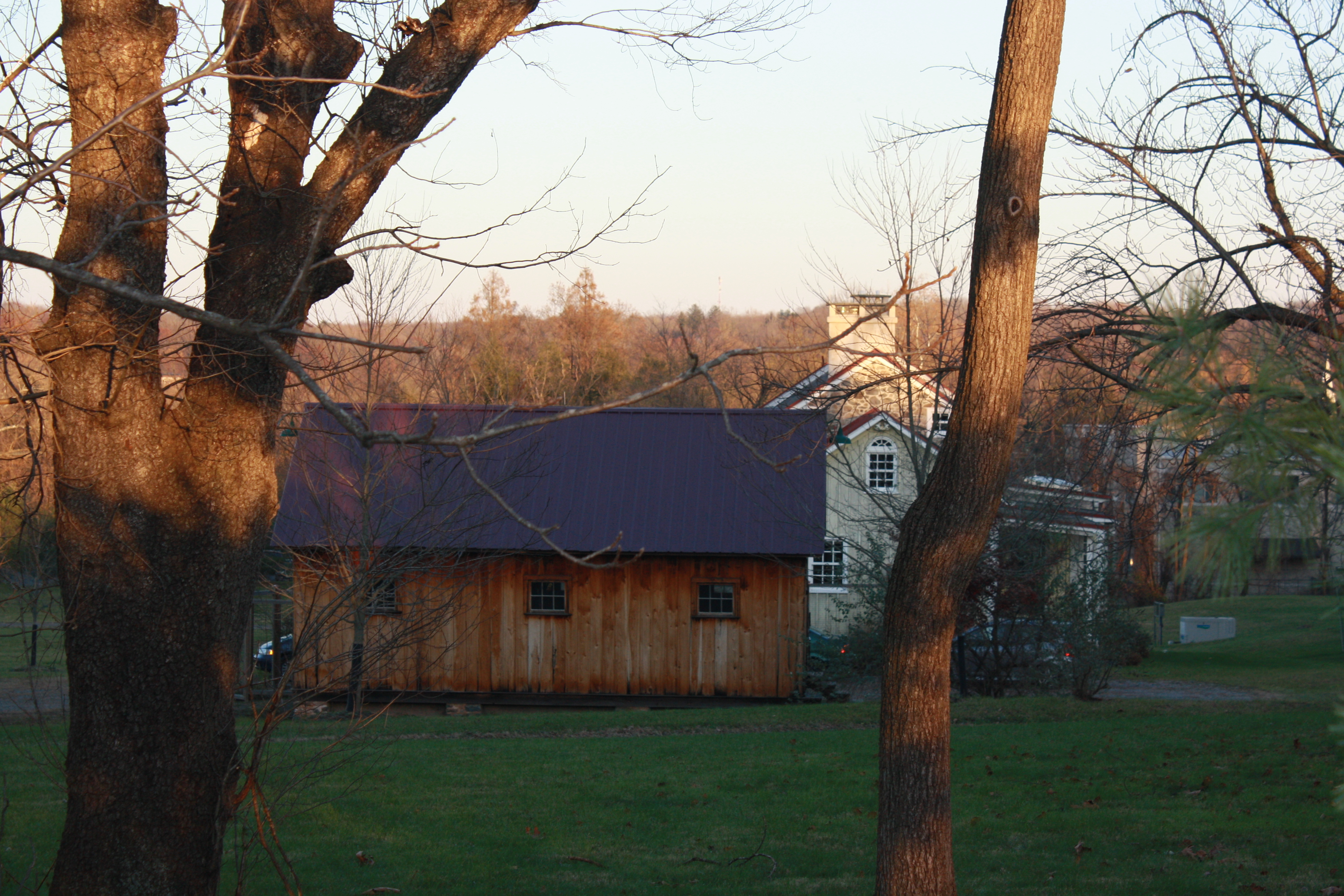
Shed.

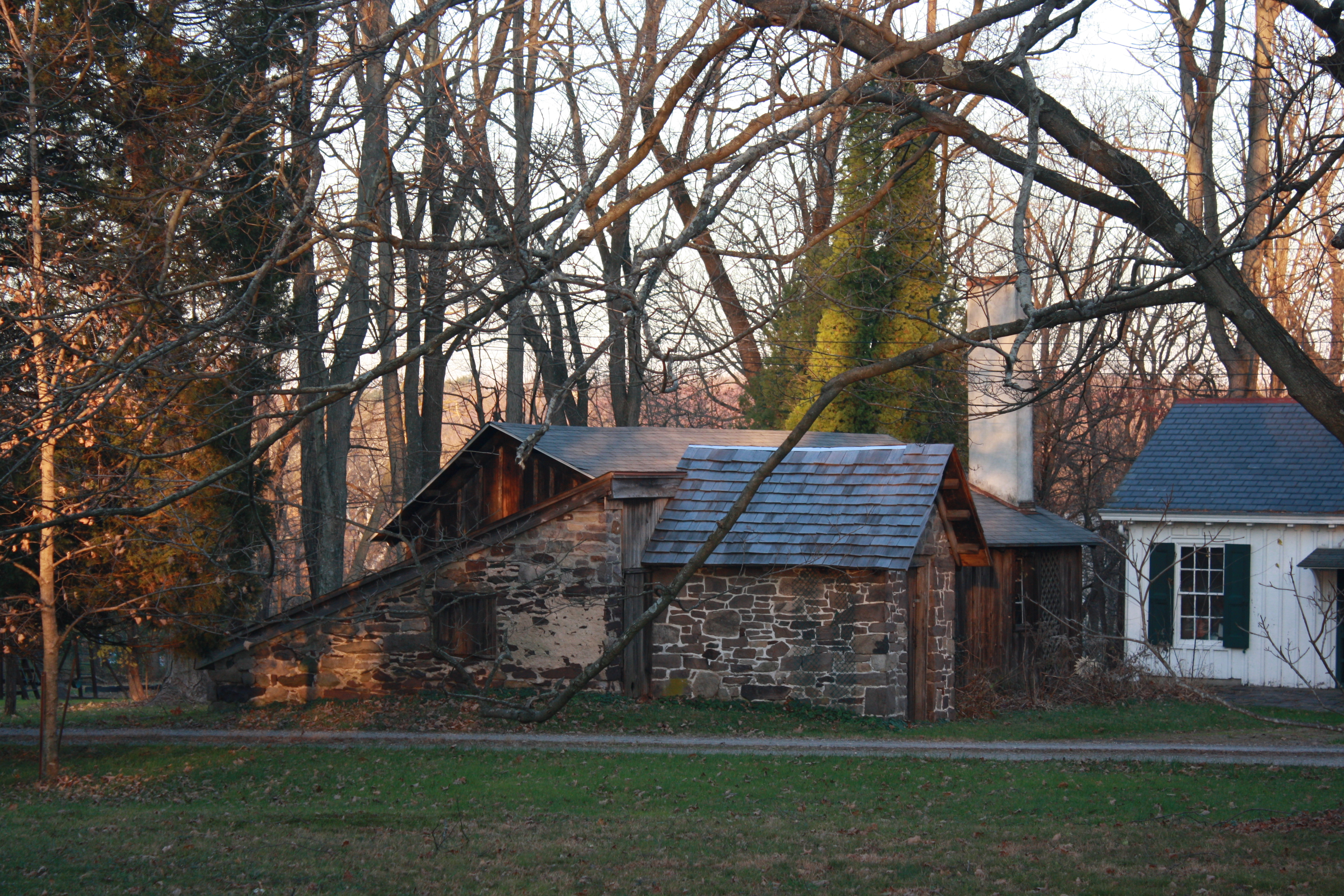
Springhouse.

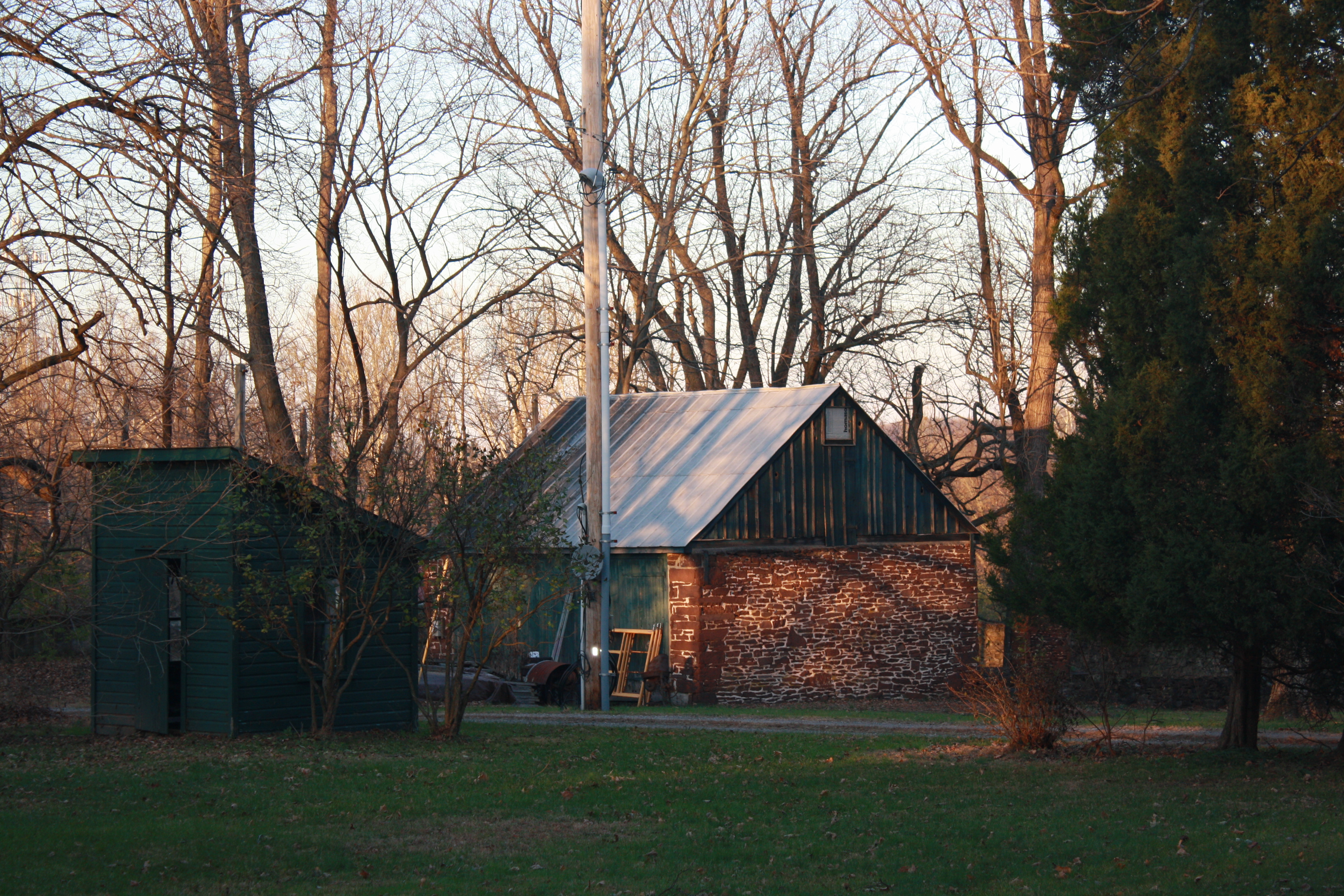
Outbuilding.
