= Joshua Ely House =

Historic house in Pennsylvania, United States

- U.S. National Register of Historic Places
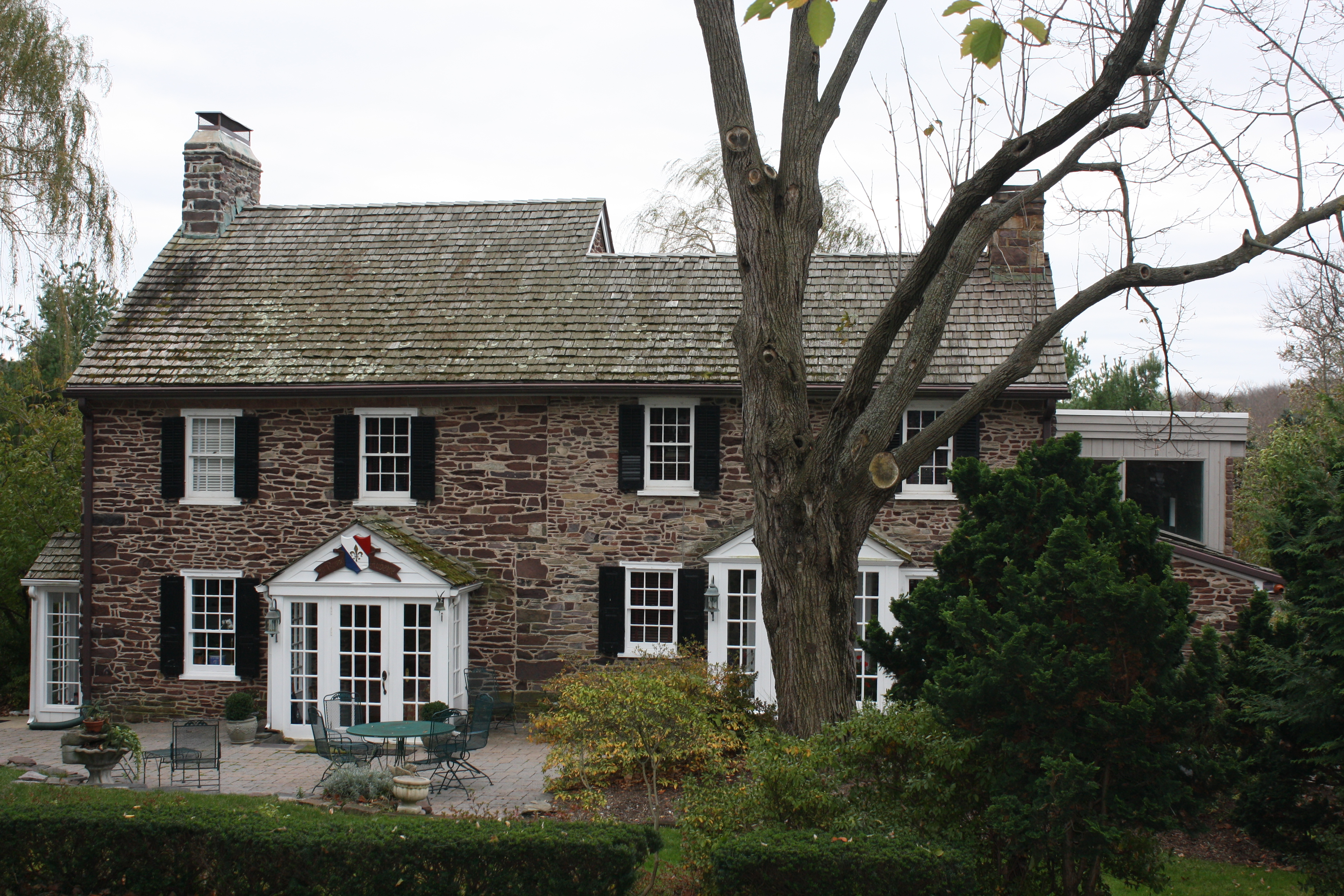
- Joshua Ely House (La Bonne Auberge). November 2012.

- Location within Pennsylvania Location within the United States
- Location: Rittenhouse Circle, New Hope, Pennsylvania
- Coordinates: 40°21′25.8″N 74°57′30″W
- Area: 5.1 acres (2.1 ha)
- MPS: New Hope MRA
- NRHP reference No.: 85000463
- Added to NRHP: March 6, 1985

The Joshua Ely House is an historic home that is located in New Hope, Bucks County, Pennsylvania, United States.

It was added to the National Register of Historic Places in 1985.

== History and architectural features ==
The house consists of two sections; one built during the late-18th century and the second in the mid-19th century. Both sections are 2 1/2 stories tall and constructed of fieldstone. It was occupied by a restaurant, La Bonne Auberge, from 1972 to 2009.

== Gallery ==
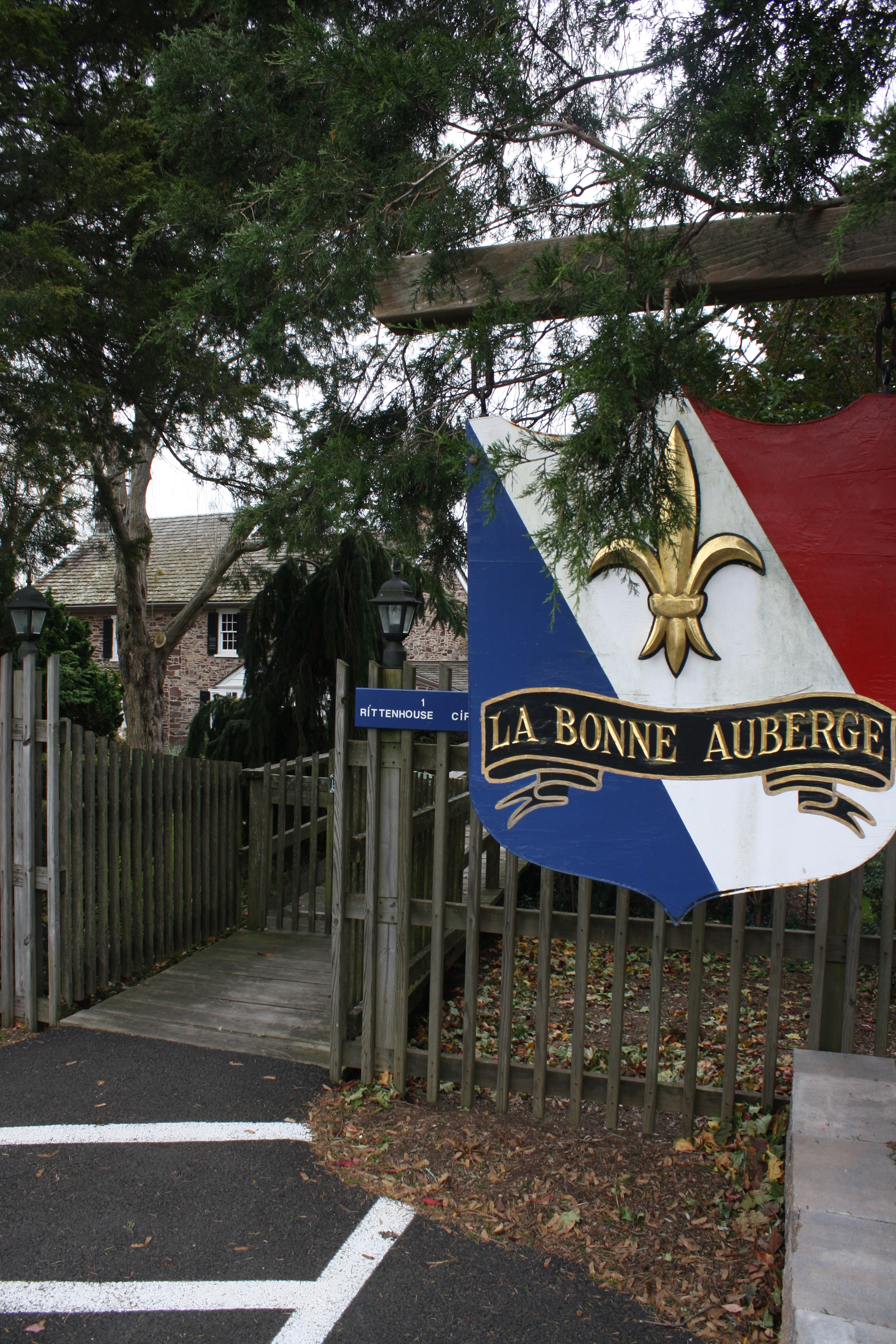
La Bonne Auberge gate
