= Middle Bucks Institute of Technology =

Coordinates: 40.2706°N 75.0874°W

- 2740 York Road; Jamison, PA 18929; United States

Information
- Type: Vocational School
- Motto: "Preparing tomorrow's workforce today"
- Director: Kathryn Strouse
- Grades: 10-12
- Color(s): Red, White, and Black
- Affiliation: Public
- Website: http://www.mbit.org/

Middle Bucks Institute of Technology (MBIT) is a vocational-technical school serving Centennial, Central Bucks, New Hope/Solebury, and Council Rock School Districts in Pennsylvania, United States. Many secondary-school students who wish obtain an in-depth education in specific technical areas not covered by their "home school" choose to attend MBIT. Typically, a student will attend either in the morning (A Session) or in the afternoon (B Session), for a three-hour class and then return to their home school. MBIT offers classes, including: Childcare, Computer Networking, Website Design, Automotive Technologies, HVAC, Dental Occupations, Health Occupations, Public Safety, Culinary Arts, Cosmetology, and Multimedia Technology.

== Educational program ==
MBIT uses the Career Cluster model, and offers ten such clusters: "Architecture & Construction", "Arts, A/V Technology & Communications", "Health Science", "Hospitality & Tourism", "Human Services", "Information Technology", "Law, Public Safety & Security", "Manufacturing", "Science, Technology, Engineering & Mathematics" and "Transportation, Distribution & Logistics". Each cluster has one or more associated career pathways. Students typically choose one career pathway, which includes core classes common to the cluster, and courses specific to the pathway. School years in each program are described as levels. Typically, 100 level as a sophomore, 200 level as a junior, and 300 level as a senior. Many programs offer scholarships or college credits after completing the 300 level.
