= Robert Beck (painter) =

American painter

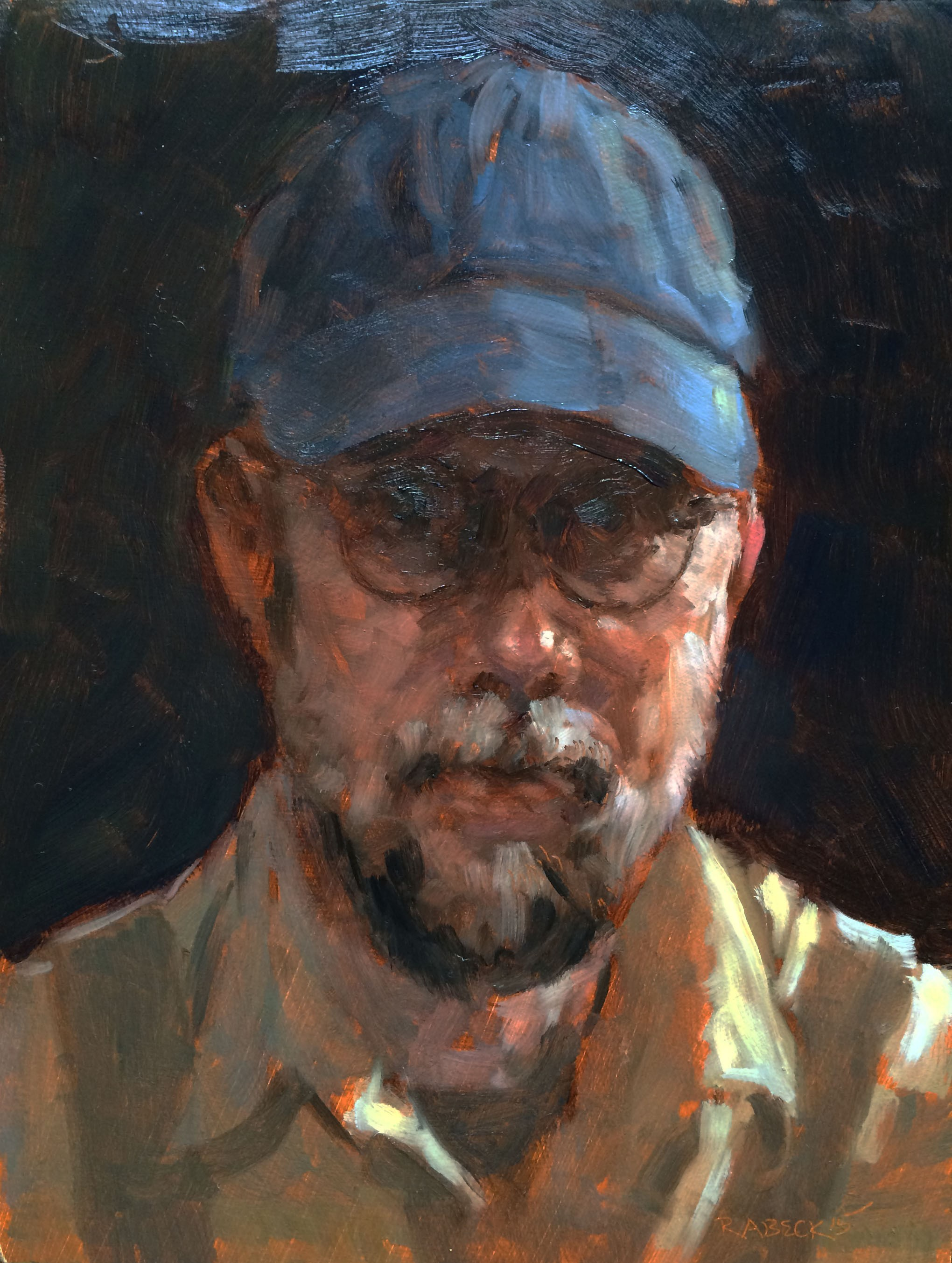
- Self portrait
- Born: Robert Beck; October 17, 1950 (age 75); Teaneck, New Jersey, U.S.
- Known for: Painting, Writing
- Style: Representational; plein air and documentary images
- Awards: Signature Member of the American Society of Marine Artists (2020); Philadelphia Sketch Club Medal of Honor for Excellence and Contribution to the Arts (2014)
- Website: http://robertbeck.net

Robert Beck (born October 17, 1950) is an American painter and writer. He is best known for his plein air paintings of scenes in and around Bucks County, Pennsylvania (particularly the New Hope area); Jonesport, Maine; and New York City, typically in multiple-painting series.

== Background ==
Beck was born in Teaneck, New Jersey on October 17, 1950, to Dorothy and Charles Beck. He was the youngest of three children. His family moved to Chalfont, Pennsylvania in 1964. Beck left a career in the business world to pursue painting, and at the age of 40 attended the Pennsylvania Academy of the Fine Arts in Philadelphia for two years as a part time student, while also working as a portrait painter.

== Painting ==
Beck’s style suggests a mix of “Impressionist brushwork with a Realist’s eye for the telling detail to create paintings that capture both the look and the personality of his subject...There is a through line that extends from Edward Redfield capturing a landscape on-site in one day and Beck’s similar approach to other aspects of the Bucks County landscape.” Gallery director Richard Rosenfeld wrote, "Sometimes Beck refers to himself as a documentary painter. Realistic accuracy is a powerful element in his work, but the term documentary suggests an objectivity, a detachment that belies what he does. Rather his works depict how he feels about a particular place at a particular time using great finesse in not crossing the line into expressionism and violating verisimilitude.”

Beck is known for painting in series – multiple images addressing diverse aspects of the same subject. These “visual essays” began with a series in Lambertville, New Jersey, that led to an exhibition of 50 small paintings, "Lambertville Portfolio," that was presented at the Rago Arts and Auction Center in 1998. Its success led to two more annual exhibitions there, before Beck opened his own studio/gallery in the town in 1999.

Beck’s painting series include work created while traveling the Mississippi River on a towboat pushing barges, a month-long trip through the American West, portraits of contemporary artists in the New Hope, Pennsylvania Arts Colony, amidst a symphony orchestra during its performances, with a racing team in Europe, and traveling with surgeons in Senegal. For more than 20 years he has painted scenes of life in the Maine maritime community, a majority of which were painted in Jonesport.

Beck’s studio work reveals a more nuanced approach to painting where the work is often more thoughtful and less dramatic. While his plein air work often exhibit short, sharp brushstrokes in an almost frenetic attempt to capture his subject at the moment, his studio paintings have a much more tranquil surface, which allows him to veer “away from Realism and toward the poetic suggestiveness of Symbolism.”

== Exhibitions ==
Beck had exhibited regularly in solo and group shows since 1988. His work has been the subject of three solo museum exhibitions beginning in 2007 with an exhibit at Trenton City Museum at Ellarslie (Love's Notions and Novelties, 2007). His second focused on his Maine paintings at the Maine Maritime Museum in 2016. In 2021, the James A. Michener Art Museum organized a career spanning retrospective, It’s Personal: The Art of Robert Beck.

Beck's work has been presented in 30 solo gallery exhibitions, including the National Arts Club (Iconic Manhattan, 2012), the Rosenfeld Gallery, Philadelphia (Philadelphia Heartbeat, 2011), the Morpeth Gallery, Pennington and Hopewell, NJ (1997–99); also in solo and joint exhibitions at the Gallery of Robert Beck (2000-2016).

His paintings have been included in many invitational exhibitions, most recently in "Reflective Impressions: The 19th National Marine Art Exhibition" presented by the American Society of Marine Artists (Albany Institute of History and Art and Minnesota Marine Art Museum, 2023), The Work of Art: Museum Collecting Unpacked (James Michener Art Museum, 2022) and Don’t Feed the Art: Woodmere’s Animal Menagerie (Woodmere Art Museum, 2022). at the Museum of the Shenandoah Valley (Second Time Around, 2014), the James A. Michener Museum (Local Mill Makes Good, 2014; Art and the River, 2008, New Hope Arts (Continuum, 2012), the Gratz Gallery (Now & Then, 2010), Stephen Friedman Gallery, London (American Artists, 2006), The Phillips Mill 75th Anniversary Retrospective (2004), and the Pennsylvania Academy of the Fine Arts (The Unbroken Line, 1997).

== Awards and Affiliations ==
Beck has won many awards and honors for his work including:

- Medal of Honor for Excellence and Contribution to the Arts, Philadelphia Sketch Club, 2014
- Elected Signature Member of the American Society of Marine Artists (2020)
- Honored Legacy Artist, New Hope Arts (2018)
- Honored Artist, Phillips Mill Annual Juried Exhibition (2017)
- Elected member of the Salmagundi Club (2019)
- Emerson Prize, Woodmere Museum of Art (1997)
- Mary Butler Award, Pennsylvania Academy of the Fine Arts Fellowship (2001)
- Finalist, Pew Fellowship in the Arts (2000)
- Woodmere Prize, Woodmere Museum of Art (1999)
- Lawrence Stein Memorial Award, Trenton City Museum at Ellarslie (2021)
- Frances D. Bergman Memorial Prize, Pennsylvania Academy of the Fine Arts (1991)

== Writing ==
Beck has been a columnist for ICON magazine since 2005. His essays appear under the heading “A Thousand Words” and he pairs a painting with each column. His essays address his life as an artist, describing techniques, environment, and issues involved in creating an image, but also issues that surround his subject. For the artist, “essay and its image represent two dimensions of the same subject, One goes deep, the other goes wide. The painting relies on the viewer’s recollection and experiences, while the writing goes beyond the picture frame and expands the narrative.”

Fifty of Beck's essays and paintings are collected in A Thousand Words: Essays and Paintings by Robert Beck published by the James A. Michener Art Museum as a companion to its retrospective exhibition on Beck’s paintings.

Since 2022, Beck has authored a bi-monthly column, "West Side Canvas," for West Side Rag, an online newspaper/blog with a quarter-million readership reach on Manhattan’s Upper West Side. His essays celebrate old haunts, backrooms, and meaningful moments treasured by the residents and former residents of that neighborhood. The articles are published along with one of Beck’s paintings, most often done live, of the column’s subject. Past columns addressed the local shoe store, the restaurant at the Metropolitan Opera House, a second-hand bookstore, and a funeral home.

Beck is also a contributing writer to the magazine Art New England which is running a multi-part essay series in 2023-2024 about his painting in Maine.

== Collections ==
Robert Beck's paintings can be found in many private and public collections. A select list of public collections include:

James A Michener Art Museum (Doylestown, Pa)

Woodmere Art Museum (Philadelphia, Pa)

Maine Maritime Museum (Bath, ME)

National Arts Club (NYC)

Penn Museum (Philadelphia, Pa.)

Trenton City Museum at Ellarslie (Trenton, NJ)

Grundy Museum (Bristol, Pa)

University of Pennsylvania (Philadelphia, Pa)

Delaware Valley University (Doylestown, Pa)

DownEast Institute for Applied Research (University of Maine)

Philadelphia School District Board of Education (Philadelphia, Pa)

New Hope/Solebury School District (Bucks County, Pa)

Campbell Soup Company (Camden, NJ)

== Other work ==
In 1994 Beck was elected president of ArtsBridge, an artist support organization with over 400 members in Lambertville, New Jersey.

The same year, he began a term on the Pennsylvania Academy of the Fine Arts Fellowship, and served through 1995.

Beck has continually taught advanced painting at a variety of schools, including The Lawrenceville School, The Flemington Art School, and Artworks Trenton, as well as in his own studio since 1995.

In 1995 Beck supported a local AIDS support organization by painting a fundraiser while it happened, and the organization auctioned the work at the end of the evening. Beck has supported numerous organizations in a similar fashion such Fisherman's Mark, the American Cancer Society, the Riverside Symphonia, and the James A. Michener Art Museum.

Beck is frequently asked to lecture on art at colleges, universities, museums, and art organizations.

In 2008, he worked closely with Michael Raphael on the design of his home and studio. The home would win the Bucks County AIA Honor Award–Residential Award.

In 2009, Beck began a two year stint as the host of The River, a two hour radio interview program on WDVR-FM in Sergeantsville, New Jersey where he spoke with a wide range of guests from a former Secretary of the Navy to the Director of Campbell Soup’s Test Kitchen.
