= New Hope, Pennsylvania =

Borough in Pennsylvania, US

- Borough
- Main Street in New Hope

- Seal

- Location of New Hope in Bucks County, Pennsylvania (left) and of Bucks County in Pennsylvania (right)

- Location in Pennsylvania Location in the United States
- Coordinates: 40°21′51″N 74°57′5″W
- Country: United States
- State: Pennsylvania
- County: Bucks

Government
  - Mayor: Laurence D. Keller

Area
  - Total: 1.42 sq mi (3.67 km^{2})
  - Land: 1.27 sq mi (3.29 km^{2})
  - Water: 0.15 sq mi (0.38 km^{2})
- Elevation: 69 ft (21 m)

Population (2020)
  - Total: 2,612
  - Density: 2,056.7/sq mi (794.08/km^{2})
- Time zone: UTC−05:00 (Eastern (EST))
  - Summer (DST): UTC−04:00 (EDT)
- ZIP Code: 18938
- Area codes: 215, 267, and 445
- FIPS code: 42-53712
- GNIS feature ID: 1182332
- Website: www.newhopeborough.org

New Hope is a borough in Bucks County, Pennsylvania, United States. The population was 2,612 at the 2020 census. New Hope is located approximately 30 mi (48 km) north of Philadelphia, and lies on the west bank of the Delaware River at its confluence with Aquetong Creek. New Hope and neighboring Solebury and Upper Makefield townships are part of the Philadelphia metropolitan area. The two-lane New Hope–Lambertville Bridge carries automobile and foot traffic across the Delaware to Lambertville, New Jersey, on the east bank. New Hope's primary industry is tourism.

== History ==
=== 18th century ===
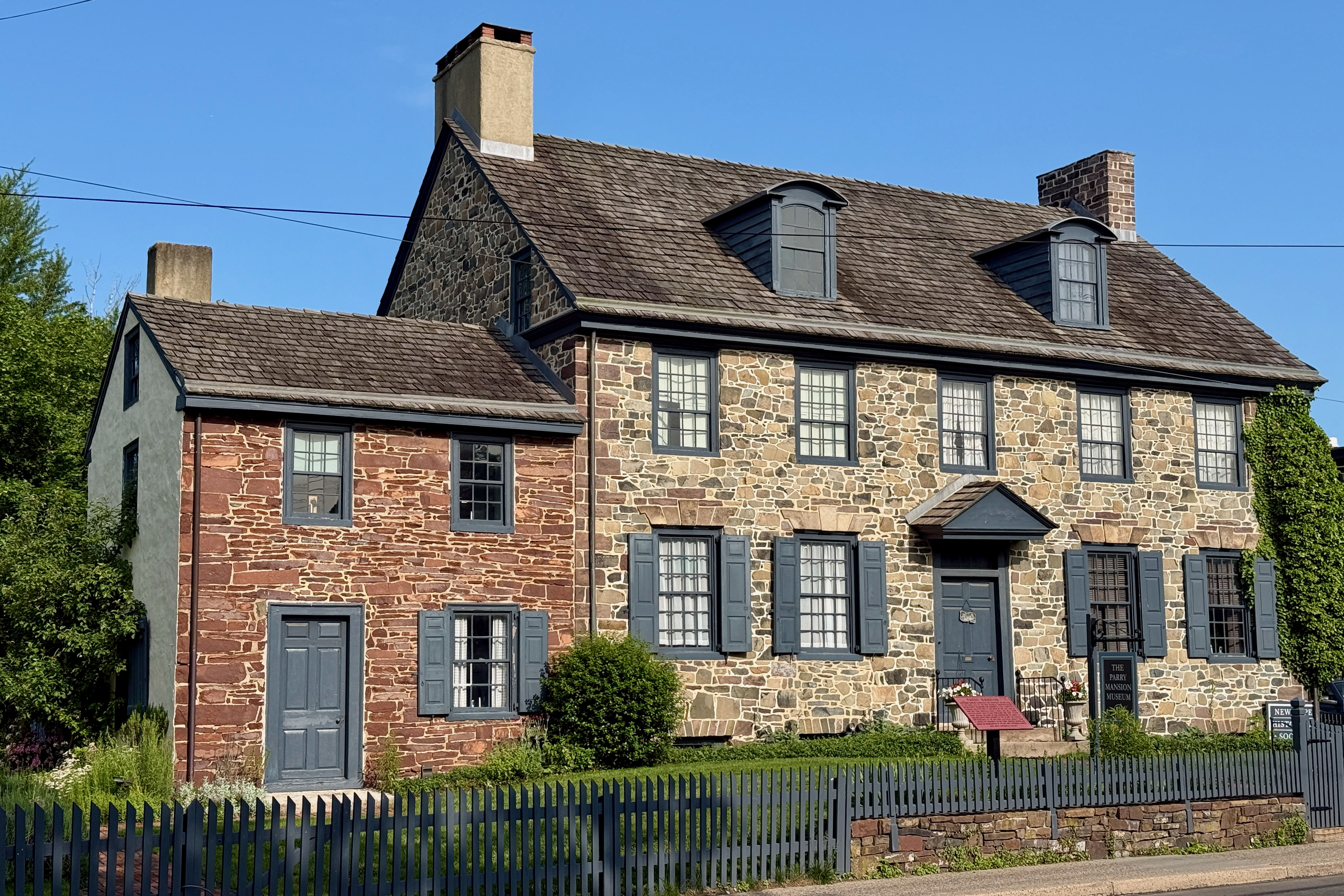
Benjamin Parry Mansion, built in 1784

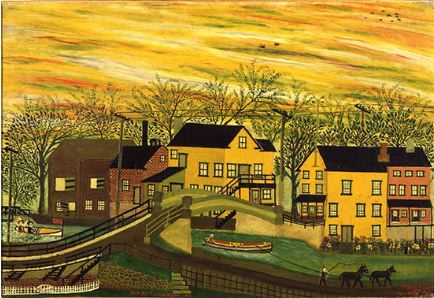
Lehigh Canal, Sunset, New Hope, PA, a 1918 portrait of the Lehigh Canal in New Hope by Joseph Pickett

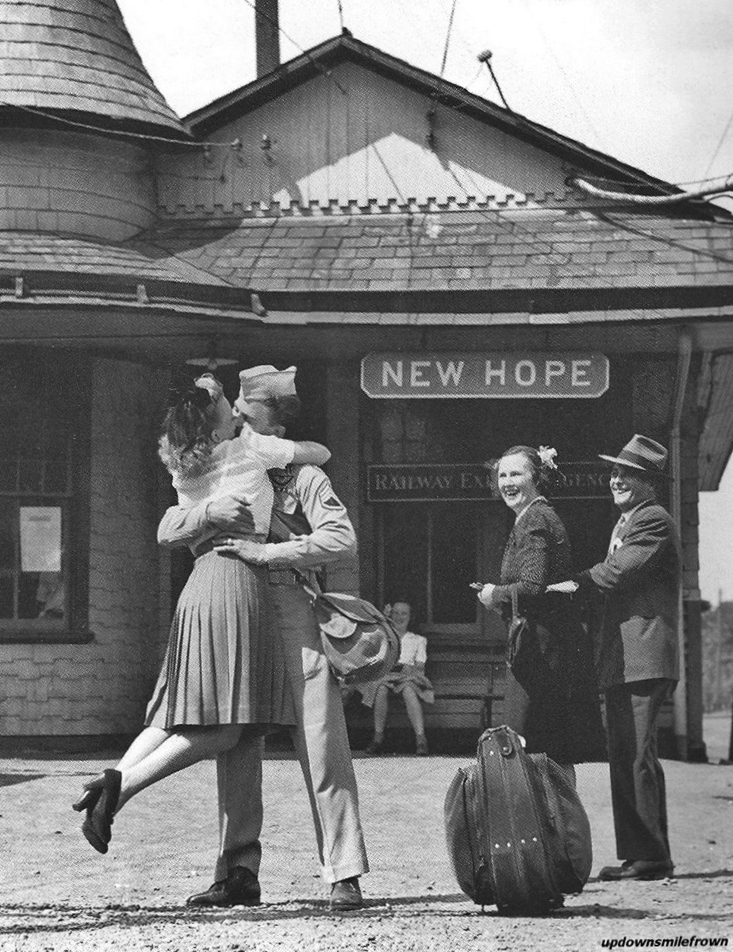
New Hope station in 1945

New Hope is located along the route of the Old York Road, the onetime main highway between Philadelphia and New York City. It was generally regarded as the halfway point, where travelers would stay overnight and be ferried across the Delaware River the next morning. The section of U.S. Route 202 that passes just north of New Hope is still named York Road, and the original route is now Bridge Street (PA 179).

New Hope was first called Wells' Ferry and later Coryell's Ferry, after the owners of the ferry business. The current name came into use following a fire in 1790 that destroyed several mills owned by Benjamin Parry. He rebuilt them and named them New Hope Mills, from which the town derives its current name.

The night prior to George Washington's crossing of the Delaware River, Washington lodged in New Hope, and then destroyed the ferry so the British Army could not follow him. Following the Battle of Trenton and Battle of Princeton, when British troops were sweeping the area, seeking Continental Army troops, there was no response when they rang for the ferry. The British assumed the town was sympathetic to the Continental Army and shelled the town. Several of the older structures in the town still claim to have unexploded British ordnance lodged in their roofbeams.

=== 19th century ===
The North Pennsylvania Railroad finished construction of their New Hope Branch in 1891, later being taken over by the Reading Railroad. Passenger service to Philadelphia's Reading Terminal as well as all other passenger activity was terminated in 1952 from Hatboro, also the end for electrified track, and New Hope.

=== 20th century ===
Between 1952 and 1966, only freight trains were seen entering and leaving New Hope, mostly to deliver paper pulp for the Union Camp Paper Corp. and to deliver sand and gravel to James D. Morrissey Materials Co., a cement company and a division of James D. Morrissey, Inc. In 1966, the New Hope and Ivyland Railroad was formed and bought 16 mi (26 km) of track from New Hope southwest to Ivyland. Scenic tourist excursions started the same year. Freight service to New Hope was then handled by the New Hope and Ivyland Railroad. In 1972, SEPTA, who by then took over Reading Railroad's passenger operations, extended the electrified route to Warminster, where the current interchange for both SEPTA and NHRR is. Freight service to James D. Morrissey Materials Co. ceased sometime in the late 1970s and to Union Camp Paper Corp. in 1985. The New Hope and Ivyland Railroad continues to provide scenic tourist excursion passenger trains between New Hope and nearby Lahaska.

In 1983, NBC network anchorwoman Jessica Savitch and her boyfriend drowned after their car overturned into the Delaware Canal. The canal passes by Odette's Restaurant, where the couple had dined on a rainy evening when visibility was poor and two warning signs were missed.

=== 21st century ===
In 2004 and 2006, New Hope was flooded when the Delaware River overflowed. On both occasions, the downtown businesses reopened within several days. Compared to the Great Flood of 1955, the 2004 and 2006 floods did not cause severe damage or fatalities.

== Geography ==
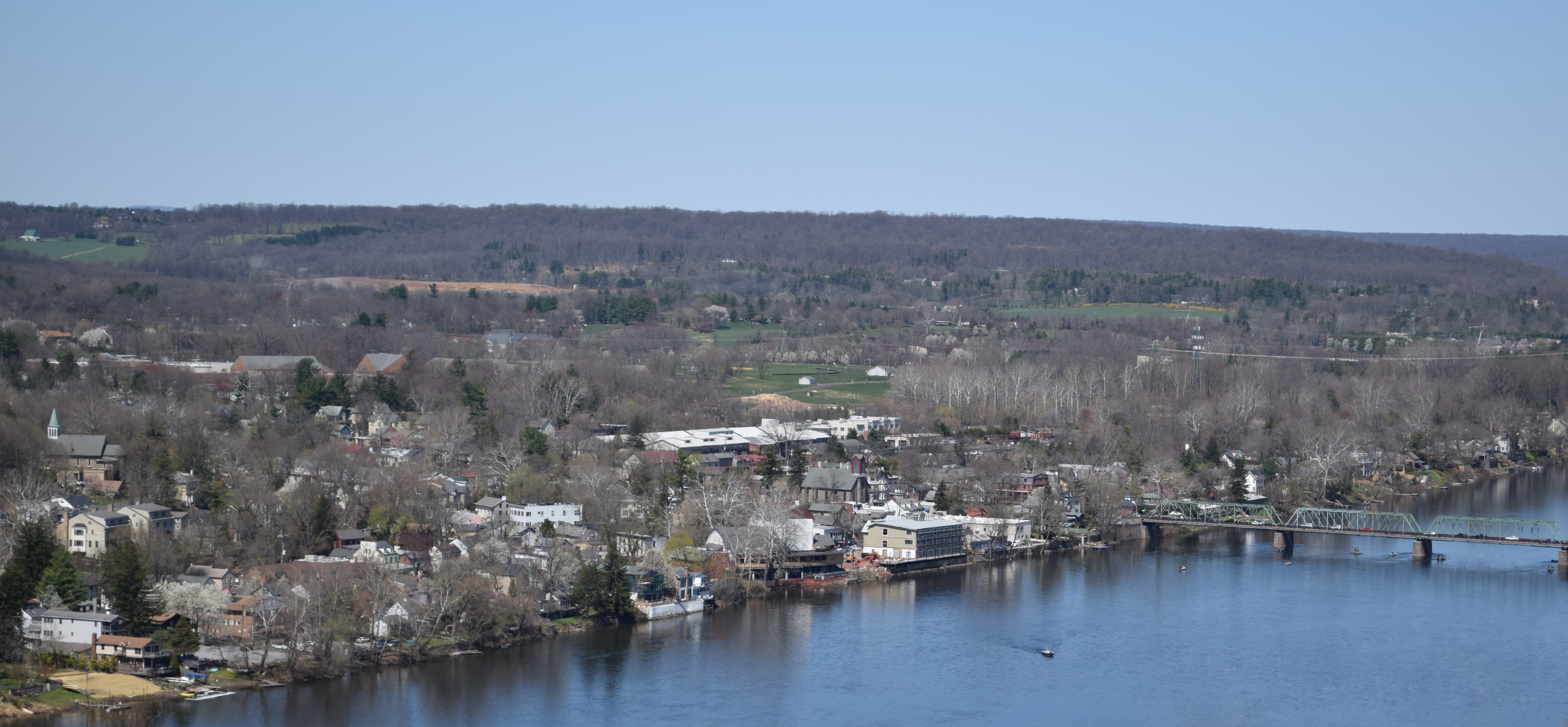
New Hope as seen from Goat Hill Overlook in Lambertville, New Jersey

According to the U.S. Census Bureau, the borough has a total area of 1.4 square miles (3.6 km^{2}), of which 1.3 square miles (3.4 km^{2}) is land and 0.2 square miles (0.52 km^{2}) (11.19%) is water. Much of that water is the Delaware River.

The borough is located at the confluence of the Delaware River and Aquetong (Ingham) Creek, which begins its two-mile course in neighboring Solebury Township at Ingham Springs, the most productive spring in Southeastern Pennsylvania. The name Aquetong comes from a Lenape word meaning "spring in the bushes," while Ingham refers to Samuel D. Ingham, an industrialist, congressman, and advocate of the canal that would run through the town. Near its end in New Hope, the creek forms a scenic millpond and waterfall near the Bucks County Playhouse, a former mill.

The former place names Hood and Hufnagel are now part of the borough.

=== Climate ===
According to the Köppen climate classification system, New Hope has a hot-summer, humid continental climate (Dfa). Dfa climates are characterized by at least one month having an average mean temperature ≤ 32.0 °F (0.0 °C), at least four months with an average mean temperature ≥ 50.0 °F (10.0 °C), at least one month with an average mean temperature ≥ 71.6 °F (22.0 °C) and no significant precipitation difference between seasons. Although most summer days are slightly humid in New Hope, episodes of heat and high humidity can occur with heat index values > 107 °F (42 °C). Since 1981, the highest air temperature was 103.3 °F (39.6 °C) on July 22, 2011, and the highest daily average mean dew point was 74.8 °F (23.8 °C) on August 13, 2016. The average wettest month is July which corresponds with the annual peak in thunderstorm activity. Since 1981, the wettest calendar day was 7.46 inches (189 mm) on August 27, 2011. During the winter months, the average annual extreme minimum air temperature is −0.3 °F (−17.9 °C). Since 1981, the coldest air temperature was −12.1 °F (−24.5 °C) on January 22, 1984. Episodes of extreme cold and wind can occur, featuring wind chill values below −11 °F (−24 °C). The average annual snowfall (Nov-Apr) is between 24 inches (61 cm) and 30 inches (76 cm). Ice storms and large snowstorms depositing ≥ 12 inches (30 cm) of snow occur once every few years, particularly during nor’easters from December through February.

Climate data for New Hope, Elevation 151 ft (46 m), 1981-2010 normals, extremes 1981-2018
Month	Jan	Feb	Mar	Apr	May	Jun	Jul	Aug	Sep	Oct	Nov	Dec	Year
Record high °F (°C)	71.5 (21.9)	78.3 (25.7)	87.7 (30.9)	94.4 (34.7)	94.9 (34.9)	96.9 (36.1)	103.3 (39.6)	100.5 (38.1)	98.2 (36.8)	89.9 (32.2)	81.1 (27.3)	75.2 (24.0)	103.3 (39.6)
Mean daily maximum °F (°C)	39.6 (4.2)	43.1 (6.2)	51.4 (10.8)	63.3 (17.4)	73.3 (22.9)	82.2 (27.9)	86.5 (30.3)	84.8 (29.3)	77.8 (25.4)	66.4 (19.1)	55.3 (12.9)	44.0 (6.7)	64.1 (17.8)
Daily mean °F (°C)	30.9 (−0.6)	33.8 (1.0)	41.3 (5.2)	51.9 (11.1)	61.6 (16.4)	70.9 (21.6)	75.6 (24.2)	73.9 (23.3)	66.7 (19.3)	55.0 (12.8)	45.4 (7.4)	35.6 (2.0)	53.6 (12.0)
Mean daily minimum °F (°C)	22.2 (−5.4)	24.4 (−4.2)	31.1 (−0.5)	40.4 (4.7)	49.8 (9.9)	59.6 (15.3)	64.6 (18.1)	63.1 (17.3)	55.5 (13.1)	43.6 (6.4)	35.6 (2.0)	27.1 (−2.7)	43.2 (6.2)
Record low °F (°C)	−13.0 (−25.0)	−4.0 (−20.0)	1.5 (−16.9)	17.5 (−8.1)	32.4 (0.2)	40.7 (4.8)	46.9 (8.3)	41.5 (5.3)	32.8 (0.4)	24.2 (−4.3)	11.0 (−11.7)	−1.2 (−18.4)	−13.0 (−25.0)
Average precipitation inches (mm)	3.47 (88)	2.75 (70)	4.13 (105)	4.08 (104)	4.24 (108)	4.52 (115)	5.15 (131)	4.01 (102)	4.40 (112)	4.03 (102)	3.76 (96)	4.14 (105)	48.68 (1,236)
Average relative humidity (%)	65.8	62.1	57.9	57.1	61.9	66.5	66.4	69.0	70.0	69.0	67.6	67.5	65.1
Average dew point °F (°C)	20.8 (−6.2)	22.2 (−5.4)	27.6 (−2.4)	37.2 (2.9)	48.4 (9.1)	59.2 (15.1)	63.6 (17.6)	63.1 (17.3)	56.6 (13.7)	45.0 (7.2)	35.3 (1.8)	25.9 (−3.4)	42.2 (5.7)
Source: PRISM

== Transportation ==
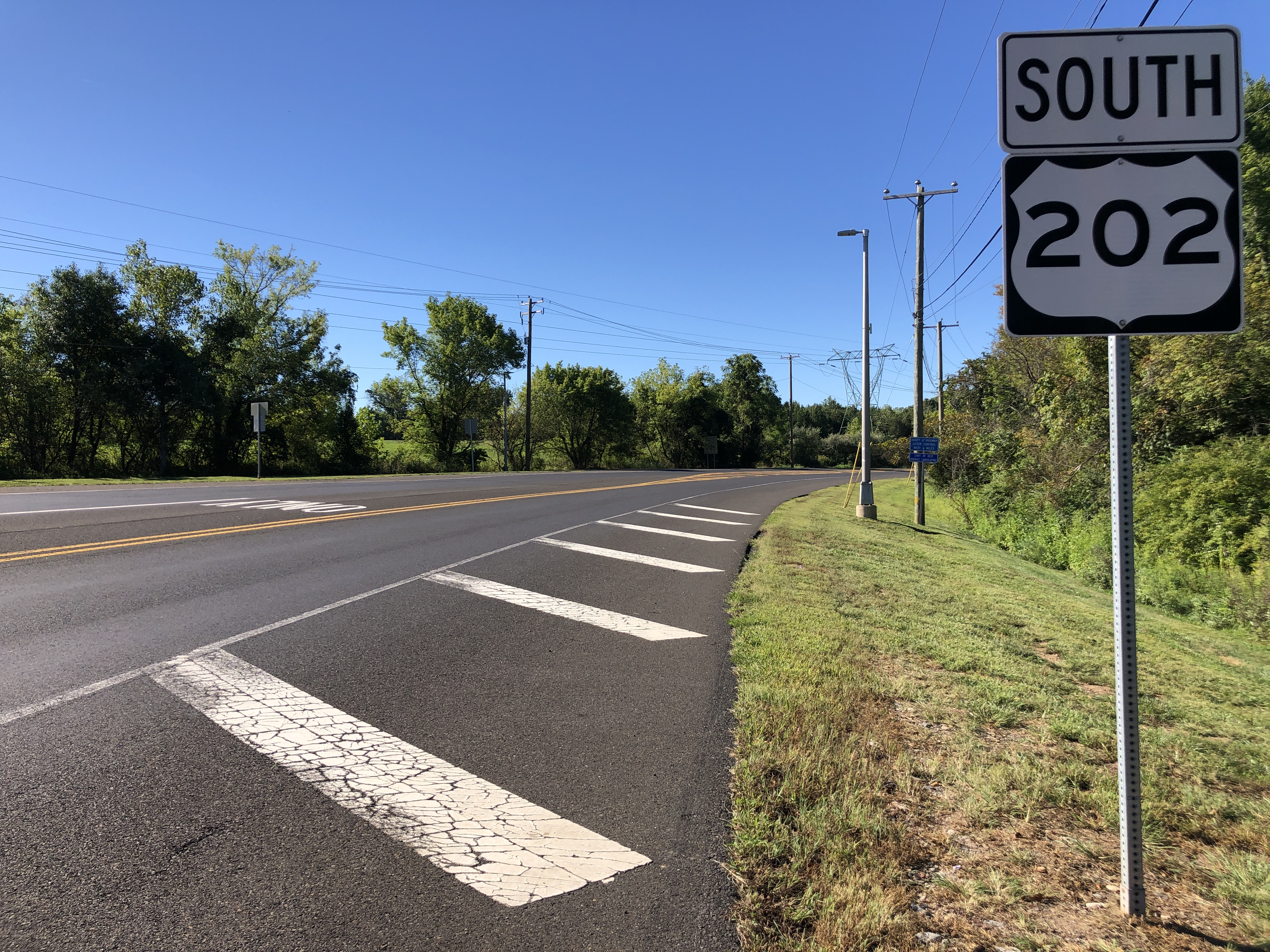
US Route 202 south in New Hope

As of 2012, there were 9.61 miles (15.47 km) of public roads in New Hope, of which 4.20 miles (6.76 km) were maintained by the Pennsylvania Department of Transportation (PennDOT) and 5.41 miles (8.71 km) were maintained by the borough.

U.S. Route 202 is the most prominent highway serving New Hope. It follows a northeast-southwest alignment along the northwestern edge of the borough. Pennsylvania Route 32 follows Main Street through the center of town, running north-south parallel to the Delaware River. Pennsylvania Route 232 has its northern terminus at PA 32 in the southern part of the borough, from which it heads southwestward along Windy Bush Road before exiting the borough. Finally, Pennsylvania Route 179 follows an east-west alignment through the center of the borough via Bridge Street, crossing the Delaware River via the New Hope–Lambertville Free Bridge. The New Hope–Lambertville Toll Bridge is just north of New Hope in Solebury Township.

Trans-Bridge Lines provides intercity bus service to Port Authority Bus Terminal in New York City from a stop at the Logan Square shopping center in Solebury Township along a route that originates in Quakertown.

== Demographics ==
Historical population
Census	Pop.	Note	%±
1840	820		—
1850	1,144		39.5%
1860	1,141		−0.3%
1870	1,225		7.4%
1880	1,151		−6.0%
1890	1,142		−0.8%
1900	1,218		6.7%
1910	1,083		−11.1%
1920	1,093		0.9%
1930	1,113		1.8%
1940	1,053		−5.4%
1950	1,066		1.2%
1960	958		−10.1%
1970	978		2.1%
1980	1,473		50.6%
1990	1,400		−5.0%
2000	2,252		60.9%
2010	2,528		12.3%
2020	2,612		3.3%

As of the 2020 census, the borough was approximately 85.2% White, 1.0% Black or African American, 0.2% American Indian or Alaskan Native, 3.1% Asian, and 4.4% identified as some other race. 6.0% of the borough identified as two or more races and 0.1% identified as three or more races. 8.0% of the population was of Hispanic or Latino ancestry. No one was of Native Islander or Other Pacific Islander ethnicity.

There were an estimated 2,612 people and 1,192 households residing in the borough. The population density was 1,843.3 inhabitants per square mile (711.7/km^{2}). There were 1,481 housing units at an average density of 1,045.2 per square mile (403.6/km^{2})

Of the approximately 1,192 households, there was a count of 690 families. Out of all the households, 14.2% housed one or more children under 18, and 53.5% housed one or more adults over the age of 60. Of the 1,336 occupied housing units, 34.5% had married couples living together, 3.1% had a female householder with no spouse present, and 2.2% had a male householder with no spouse present. The average household size was 2.11 and the average family size was 2.70.

In 2020 estimates, 11.8% were under the age of 18, 7.1% are 18 to 24, 15.2% are 25 to 44, 43.1% are 45 to 64, and 23.0% are 65 years of age or older. The estimated median age was 56.2 years. The estimated male to female ratio is 1.25 to 1.

The median income for a household in the borough was estimated at $107,000, and the median income for a family was an estimated $173,750. The 2020 census found that 2.5% of New Hope's population is without healthcare coverage. In 2020, an estimated 63.6% of the population had a bachelor's degree or higher. New Hope's estimated employment rate was 59.6%.

== Arts and culture ==
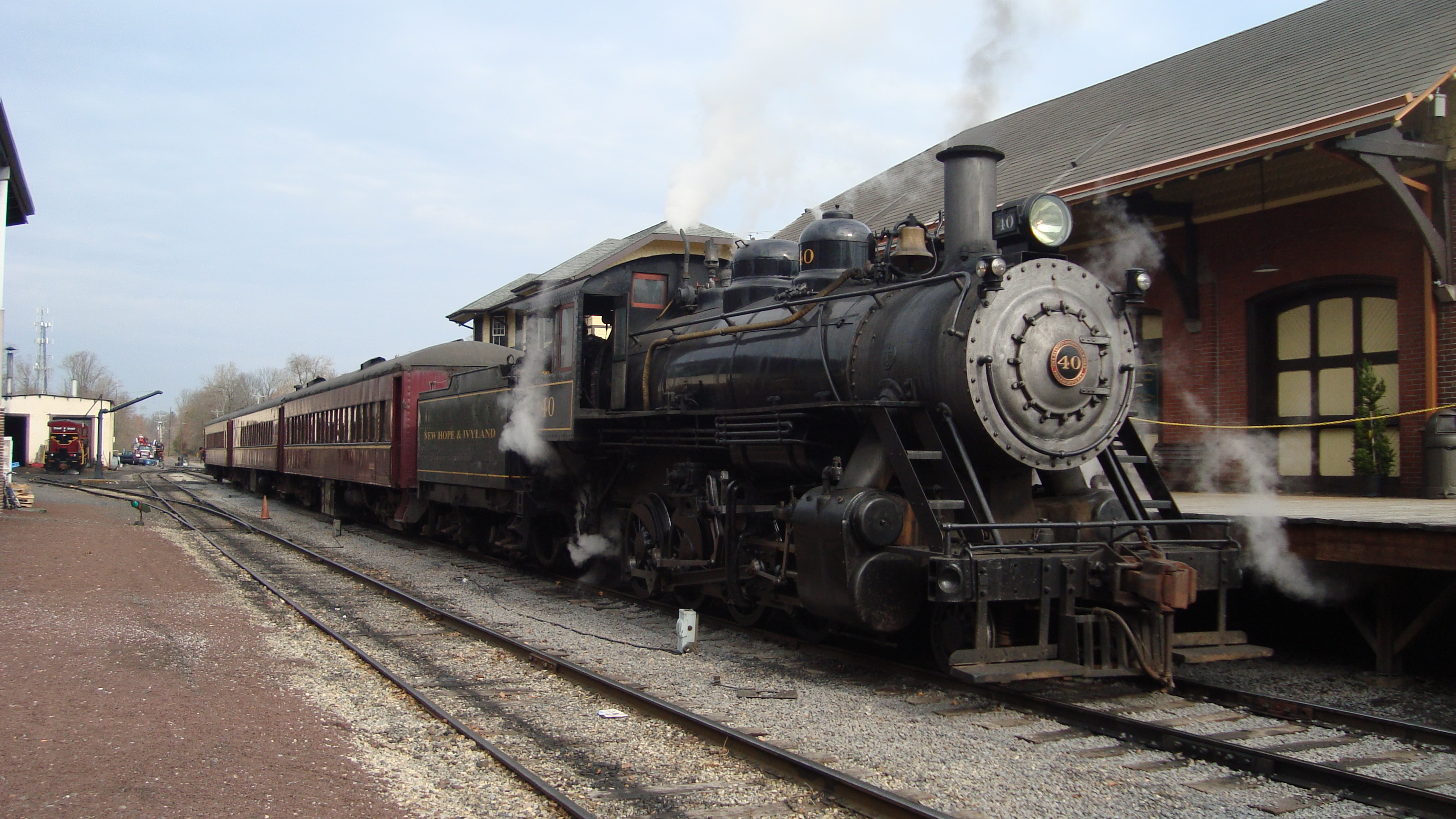
New Hope Railroad

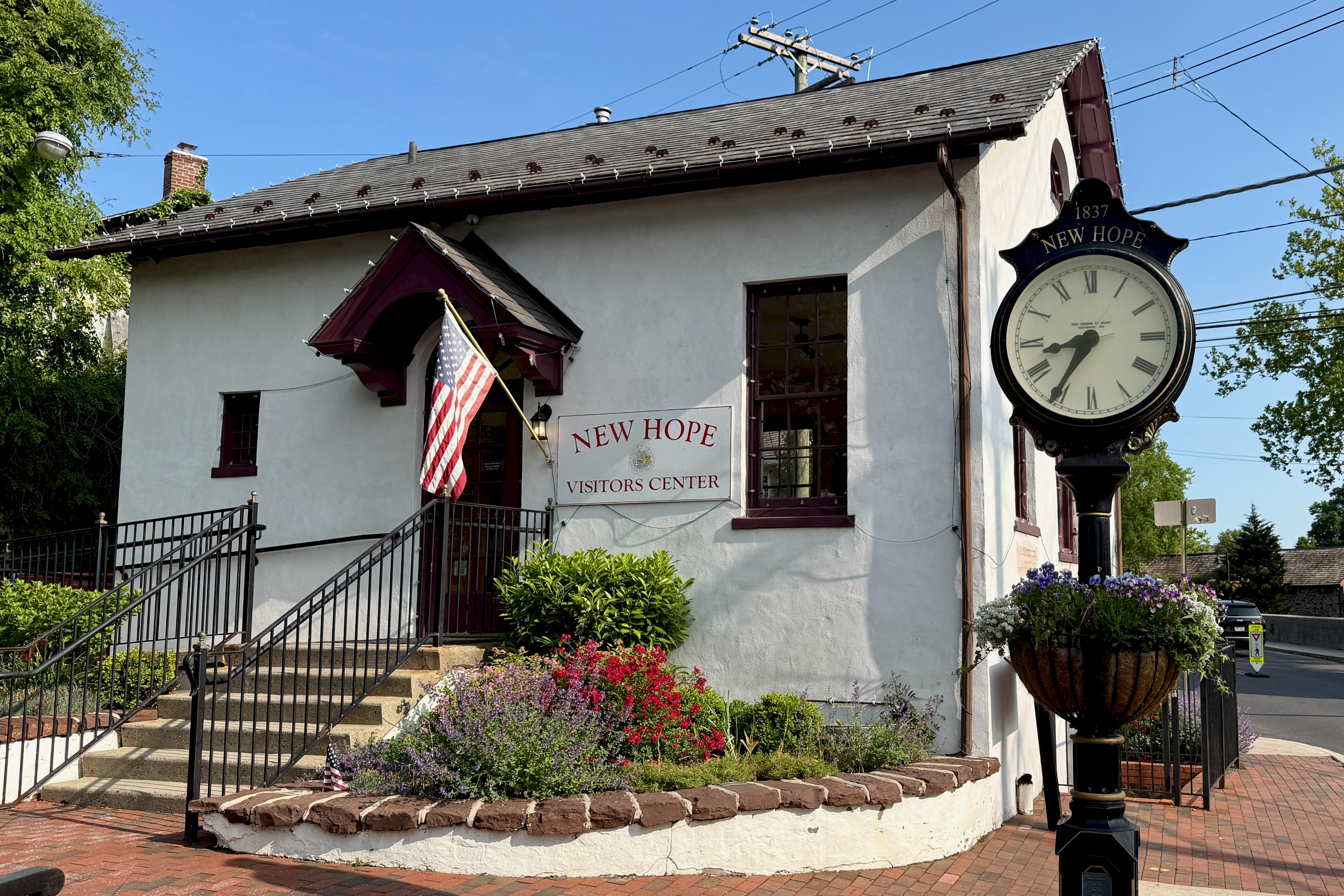
Old Town Hall, which now serves as the visitor center

New Hope's primary industry is tourism. New Hope has historically been a location where Broadway theater shows were "tested and fine tuned," and many notable stage actors bought weekend homes in the area. Bucks County Playhouse featured many plays and musical productions. In 2010, the Playhouse was closed after lenders foreclosed the property. In 2012, the Playhouse re-opened after an extensive renovation.

New Hope lent its name to the New Hope art colony, founded by Edward Willis Redfield and William Langson Lathrop, that produced noted regional work. Members or associates of the colony included George Sotter, Daniel Garber and Fern Coppedge. The colony was centered north of New Hope Borough in Phillips Mill, Solebury Township.

New Hope became a popular gay resort in the 1950s, and continues to have an active and large gay community. New Hope also attracts motorcyclists on weekends in the warmer months.

Union Camp Corporation had a bag production facility in New Hope until the mid 1990s, which employed about 100 and was located uphill from the railroad. The former factory complex, now known as Union Square, has been re-purposed into tourism-related shops and businesses.

In 2010, the New Hope and Lambertville area Chambers of Commerce conducted a fireworks show every Friday night during the summer to increase tourism and merchant revenue. Bars and restaurants benefited from the fireworks show, but residents criticized the weekly event, claiming it was disruptive and reduced parking. In 2014, the New Hope Chamber of Commerce canceled the firework show, citing a rise in shoplifting, garbage, and an overall decline in store traffic and Friday night revenues.

=== Historic sites ===
Cintra, Joshua Ely House, New Hope Village District, Rhoads Homestead, and Springdale Historic District are listed on the National Register of Historic Places.

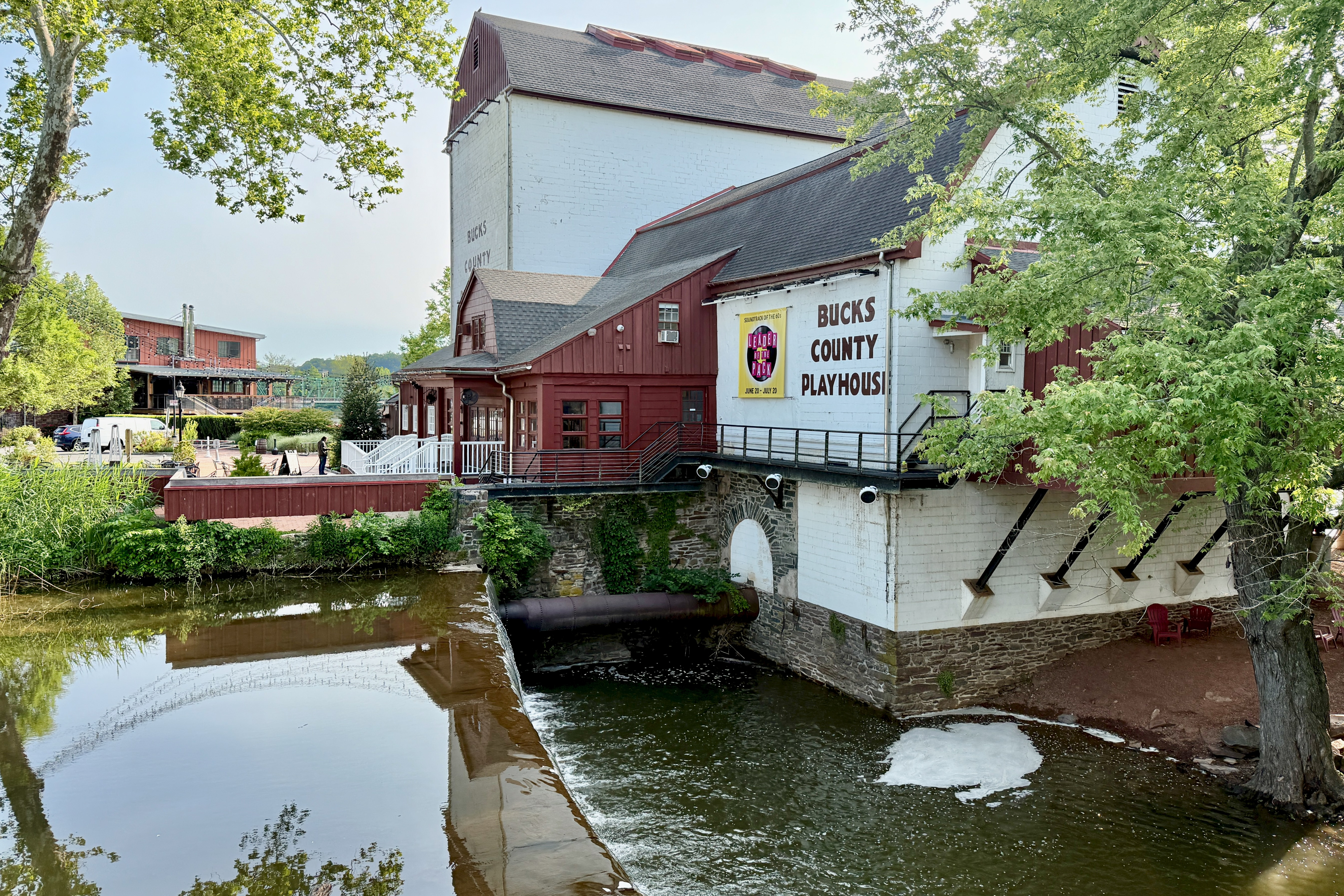
Waterfall and millpond on the Aquetong Creek

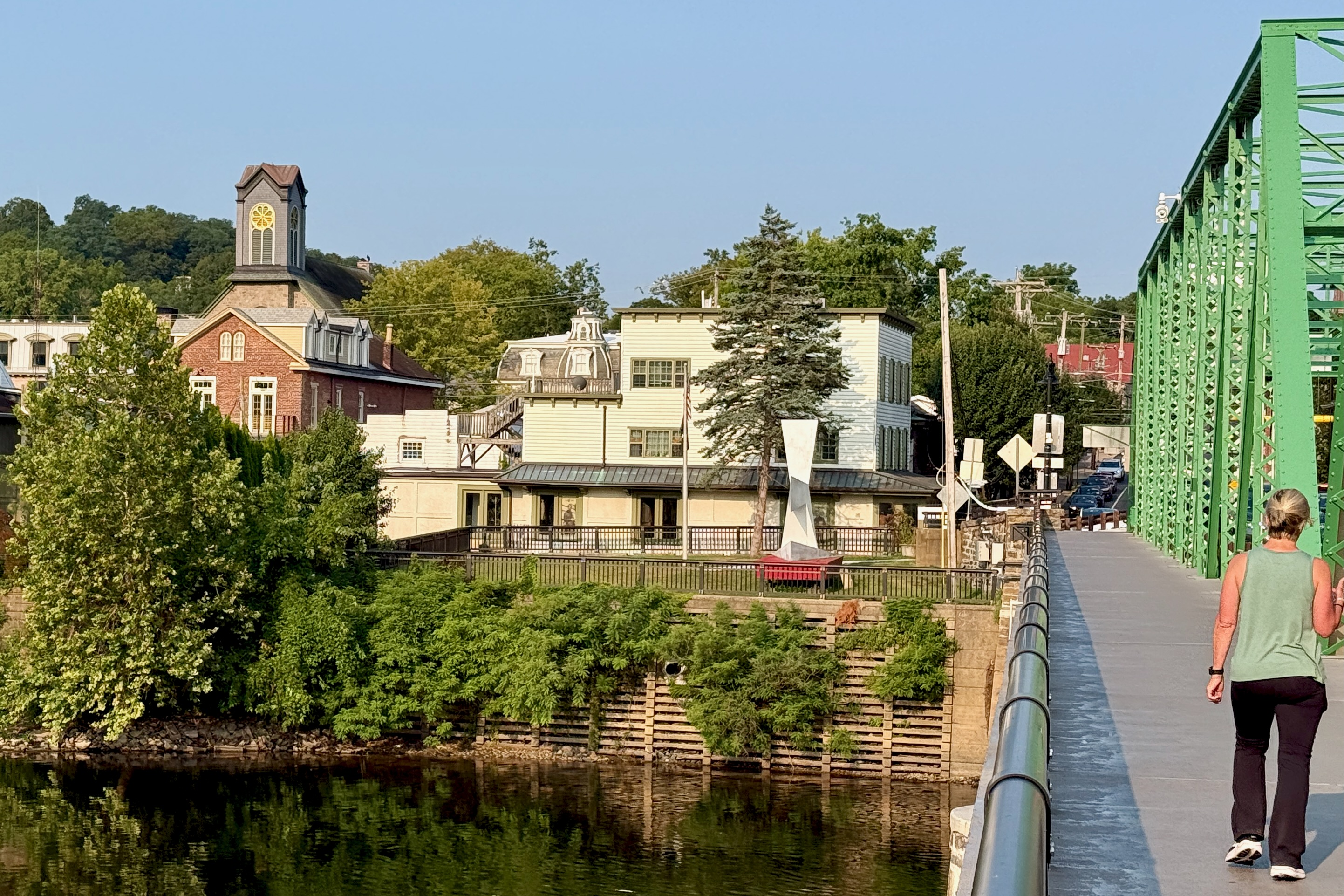
View of the New Hope Village District

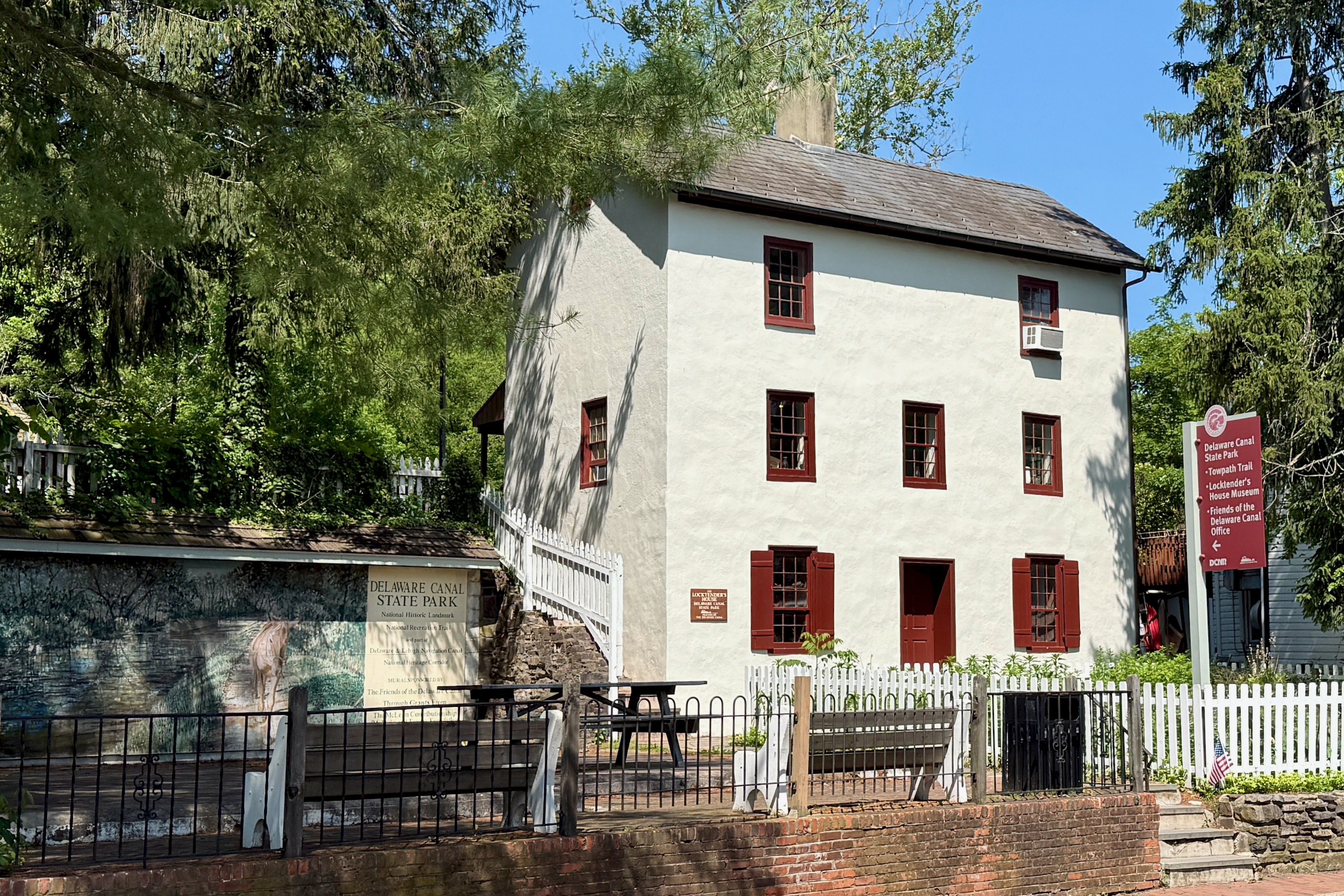
Friends of the Delaware Canal, Locktender's House Museum

== Education ==
The New-Hope Solebury School District offers a public education to residents of New Hope and neighboring Solebury. The school districts of New Hope and Solebury were integrated in 1957.

The Roman Catholic Archdiocese of Philadelphia announced in 2011 that St. Martin of Tours School was closing as the number of students had declined.

== Notable people ==
- Christian Bauman, novelist, musician, and former NPR/All Things Considered commentator
- Robert Beck, artist
- Rebecca Blasband, television personality and singer-songwriter
- Gregg Cagno, folk singer-songwriter
- Steve Garvey, punk rock bassist for the Buzzcocks
- Patricia Highsmith, novelist and short story writer
- Thomas Holmes, former CEO of Ingersoll Rand
- Marijane Meaker, writer
- Thom Michael Mulligan, actor and executive director of the New Hope Film Festival
- Odette Myrtil, actress, singer, violinist
- George Nakashima, woodworker, architect, and furniture maker who was one of the leading innovators of 20th century furniture design and a father of the American craft movement
- Steve Neumann, professional soccer player
- Joseph Pickett, folk painter
- Antonin Raymond, architect and interior designer
- Michele Sainte, club and rave DJ
- Bryan Scott, NFL player
- Ted Tally, screenwriter and playwright
- Dean Ween (Michael Melchiondo) and Gene Ween (Aaron Freeman), founding members of the band Ween
- Chuck Wendig, author and screenwriter
- Amber Wisner, professional women's soccer player, Washington Spirit
- Winter Ave Zoli, actress

=== Impressionist artists ===
- Rae Sloan Bredin, landscape painter
- Morgan Colt, architect and landscape painter
- Fern Coppedge, landscape painter
- L. Birge Harrison, landscape painter, instructor at the Art Students League of New York
- John Fulton Folinsbee, landscape and marine painter
- Harry Leith-Ross, Scottish-American landscape painter
- Mary Elizabeth Price, landscape painter
- Charles Rosen, landscape painter
- Walter Elmer Schofield, landscape and marine painter
- Robert Spencer, landscape painter

== See also ==
- Bowman's Hill Wildflower Preserve
- Washington Crossing Historic Park
- Pennsylvania Impressionism
