= Joseph Pickett (painter) =

American painter

Joseph Pickett (1848–1918) was an American Naïve painter.

== Biography ==
Pickett was born in 1848 in New Hope, Pennsylvania. His father, Edward Pickett, had moved to New Hope in 1840 to repair one of the canal locks there and stayed to become a boatbuilder. Joseph worked a variety of jobs throughout his life, including carpenter, shipbuilder, carny, and storekeeper.

He operated shooting galleries in the carnival and opened one of his own in Neshaminy Falls, Pennsylvania. He married around the age of 45 and left the carnival to open a general store. He only started painting at this later stage in his life. He was known to paint local scenes in his hometown of New Hope.

His art was not discovered by the public until the 1930s. He was buried at Hulmeville Cemetery in Hulmeville, Pennsylvania. There have also been sightings of the ghost of Pickett in a house that he had lived in.

== Gallery ==
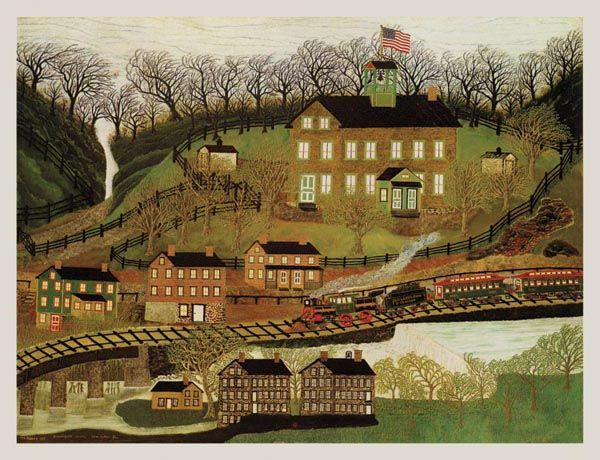
Manchester Valley

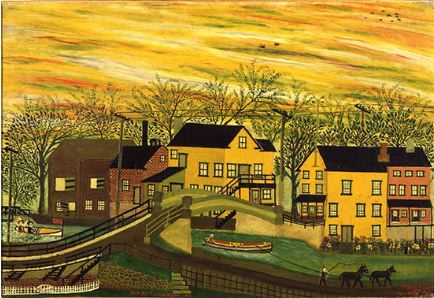
Lehigh Canal, Sunset, New Hope, PA

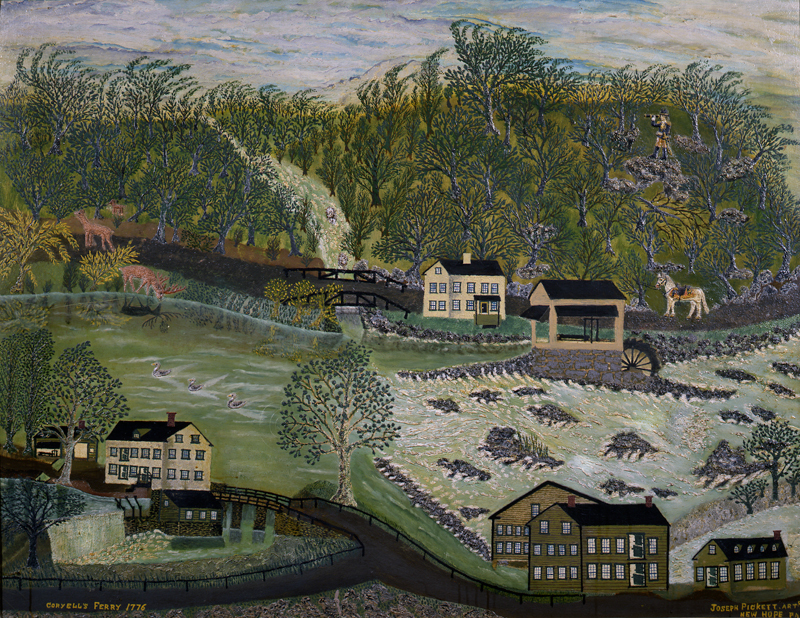
Coryell's Ferry, 1776

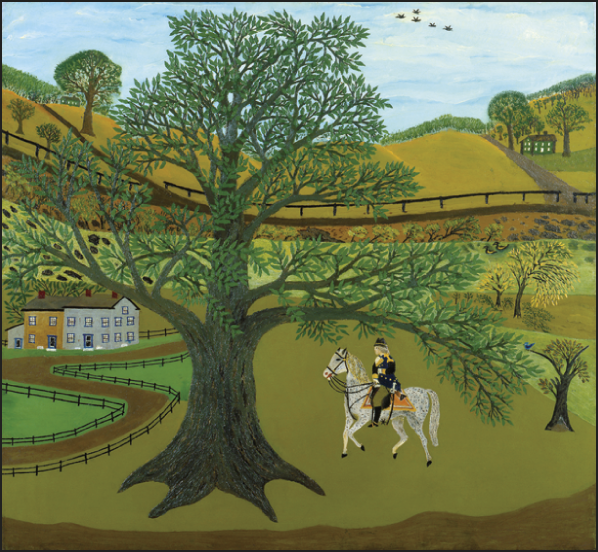
Washington Under the Council Tree

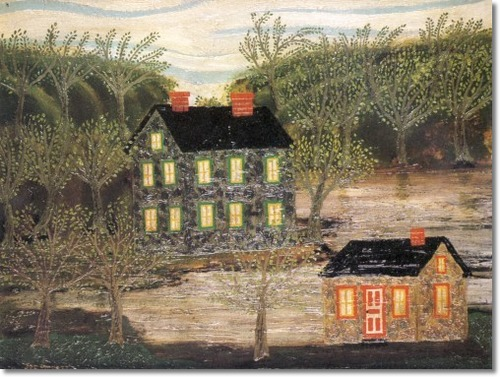
Houses By A Stream Lambertville
