= New Hope-Solebury School District =

School district in Pennsylvania

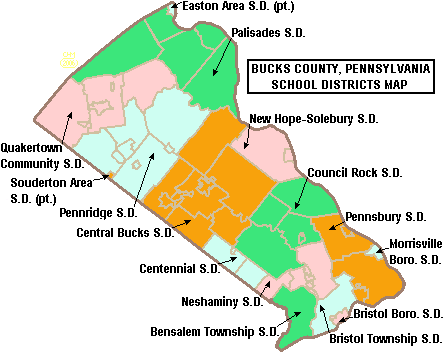

Address
- 180 West Bridge Street New Hope, Bucks County, Pennsylvania, 18938; United States

District information
- Type: Public
- Grades: K–12
- Established: 1942
- Superintendent: Charles Lentz
- Schools: 4
- Budget: $45,758,471 (2024)
- NCES District ID: 4216860

Students and staff
- Enrollment: 1,285 (2022–23)
- District mascot: Lions
- Colors: Royal Blue, Gold

Other information
- Student teacher ratio: 11.22 (2022–23)
- Website: www.nhsd.org

New Hope-Solebury School District is the only school district that educates children in Solebury Township, Pennsylvania; and the Borough of New Hope, Pennsylvania. New Hope-Solebury School District includes the communities of New Hope, Solebury, Lahaska, Carversville, and Lumberville, enrolling 1,285 students in 2023. Covering 28.57 square miles, New Hope-Solebury School District is relatively small and rural compared to the larger and more urbanized public school districts that surround it.

Within the school district is one elementary school (broken into two campuses), one middle school and one high school. All schools except one of the elementary schools reside on the same campus in downtown New Hope. Since 2000, both the middle school and high school have been renovated and a second elementary school campus has been added.

In 2024, the district's budget was $45,758,471. In 2023, the student teacher ratio was 11.22.

Charles Lentz has been the superintendent of New Hope-Solebury School District since December 2018.

== Elementary schools ==
- New Hope-Solebury Lower Elementary School: Grades K-2 (Solebury, PA)
- New Hope-Solebury Upper Elementary School: Grades 3-5 (New Hope, PA)

== Middle school ==
- New Hope-Solebury Middle School: Grades 6-8 (New Hope, PA)

== High school ==
- New Hope-Solebury High School: Grades 9-12 (New Hope, PA)
