= Boredoms discography =

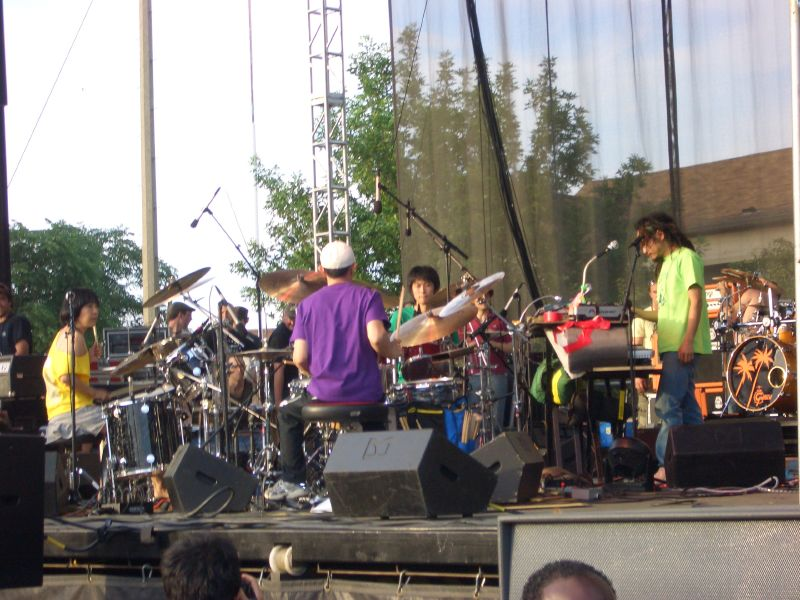
- Boredoms at the 2006 Intonation Music Festival in Chicago
- Studio albums: 7
- Extended plays: 11
- Live albums: 2
- Compilation albums: 2
- Singles: 3
- Video albums: 2
- Cassettes: 4
- Remix albums: 5
- Other appearances: 17

This is a discography of Boredoms, a Japanese experimental noise rock band. To date, Boredoms have released seven full-length studio albums, eleven EPs (nine of which comprise their Super Roots series), three singles, two live albums, three videos, a cassette series, and five remix albums, in addition to their members' various side projects.

Although the band's work can be documented back to 1982 with the Early Boredoms compilation released with Soul Discharge, the earlier records by the band under the name Boredoms, Anal by Anal and Soul Discharge, were put out on the small independent Japanese labels while American label Shimmy Disc and English label Earthnoise distributed records overseas. Their success garnered attention from the Warner Music Group as its Japanese and American sublabels, WEA Japan and Reprise, released Pop Tatari in 1992 and 1993. Reprise dropped the band after the 1996 release of Super Roots 6, and the band's United States releases were picked back up by Birdman. The band went on hiatus for a few years around 2001 when the Rebore series was finished; they were consequently dropped by Birdman.

When the band reconvened in 2004 as V∞redoms for the release of Seadrum/House of Sun, they were signed on to Vice, who also reissued the band's catalogue of Super Roots EPs up through 8 (minus Super Roots 2). Although WEA Japan still released Seadrum/House of Sun in Japan, the band left the label to sign to two smaller labels—Commmons for Japan and Thrill Jockey for the United States—through which the band released Super Roots 9 and their second DVD set Live at Sunflancisco.

== Discography ==
=== Studio albums ===
| Year | Title |
|---|---|
| 1988 | Osorezan no Stooges Kyo: Label: Selfish (#BEL-12025); Released: March 1988 |
| 1989 | Soul Discharge: Label: Selfish (#BEL-12039); Released: December 1989 |
| 1992 | Pop Tatari: Label: WEA Japan (#WMC3-24); Released: 25 September 1992 |
| 1994 | Chocolate Synthesizer: Label: WEA Japan (#WPC2-7508); Released: 25 July 1994 |
| 1998 | Super æ: Label: WEA Japan (#WPC6-8442); Released: 25 May 1998 |
| 1999 | Vision Creation Newsun: Label: WEA Japan (#WPC6-10049); Released: 27 October 1999 |
| 2004 | Seadrum/House of Sun: Label: WEA Japan (#WPCL-10119); Released: 23 September 2004 |

=== Live albums ===
| Year | Title |
|---|---|
| 1993 | Wow 2: Label: Disk Union/Avant (#BEL-12025); Released: 10 October 1993 |
| 2008 | 77 Boadrum: Label: Commmons (#RZCM-46037); Released: 26 November 2008 |

=== EPs ===
| Year | Title |
|---|---|
| 1986 | Anal by Anal: Label: Trans (#Trans-12); Released: August 1986 |
| 1993 | Super Roots: Label: WEA Japan (#WMC3-41); Released: 25 September 1993 |
| 1994 | Super Roots 2: Label: WEA Japan (#3CS-2011); Released: 25 July 1994 |
| 1994 | Super Roots 3: Label: WEA Japan (#WPC2-7513); Released: 30 November 1994 |
| 1995 | Super Roots 5: Label: WEA Japan (#WPC2-7518); Released: 21 December 1995 |
| 1996 | Super Roots 6: Label: WEA Japan (#WPC2-7519); Released: 25 January 1996 |
| 1998 | Super Roots 7: Label: WEA Japan (#WPC6-8520); Released: 26 November 1998 |
| 1999 | Super Roots 8: Label: WEA Japan (#WPC6-10011); Released: 24 February 1999 |
| 1999 | Vision Creation Newsun: Label: WEA Japan (#WPC6-10032); Released: 29 September 1999 |
| 2007 | Super Roots 9: Label: Commmons (#RZCM-45441); Released: 28 March 2007 |
| 2009 | Super Roots 10: Label: Commmons (#RZCM-46118); Released: 28 January 2009 |

=== Singles ===
| Year | Title |
|---|---|
| 1990 | "Michidai" / "Fuanteidai": Label: Public Bath (#PB-3); Released: 1990 |
| 1998 | "Super Go!!!!!": Label: WEA Japan (#WPC6-8420); Released: 25 April 1998 |
| 1998 | "Super 77" / "Super Sky": Label: WEA Japan (#WQJB-1005); Released: 7 August 1998 |

=== Remix albums ===
| Year | Title |
|---|---|
| 2000 | Rebore, vol. 1: Label: WEA Japan (#WPC6-10098 / #WQJB-1049); Released: 27 September 2000 |
| 2000 | Rebore, vol. 2: Label: WEA Japan (#WPC6-10115 / #WQJB-1050); Released: 22 November 2000 |
| 2001 | Rebore, vol. 3: Label: WEA Japan (#WPC6-10119 / #WQJB-1051); Released: 21 February 2001 |
| 2001 | Rebore, vol. 0: Label: WEA Japan (#WPC6-10136 / #WQJL-73); Released: 23 May 2001 |
| 2008 | Voaltz / Rereler: Label: Rhythm Republic (#RR1288536); Released: 30 August 2008 |

=== Videos ===
| Year | Title |
|---|---|
| 1998 | Super Seeeeee!!!!!!: Label: WEA Japan (#WPV6-8113); Released: 5 June 1998; Format: VHS (DVD re-releases) |
| 2007 | Live at Sunflancisco: Label: Commmons (#RZCM-45758/B); Released: 19 December 2007; Format: DVD + CD |

=== Cassettes ===
| Year | Title |
|---|---|
| 1988 | Boretronix 1: Label: Mega Scum Groove Inc.; Released: 1988 |
| 1989 | Boretronix 2: Label: ? Records (#?-002); Released: 1989 |
| 1990 | Boretronix 3: Label: ? Records (#?-004); Released: 1990 |
| | Boretronix 4: Label: ? Records |

=== Compilations ===
| Year | Title |
|---|---|
| 1989 | Soul Discharge/Early Boredoms: Label: Shimmy Disc (#shimmy-035); Released: December 1989 |
| 1994 | Onanie Bomb Meets the Sex Pistols: Label: WEA Japan (#WPC2-7502); Released: 25 April 1994 |

=== Other appearances ===
| Year | Title | Label | Track(s) |
|---|---|---|---|
| 1985 | Kill SPK | Beast 666 Tapes | "U.S.A." |
| 1986 | Dead Tech | Dossier | "Special Punk King" (same as "U.S.A.") |
| 1987 | Journey into Pain | Beast 666 Tapes | "We Are the Law!!" |
| 1988 | NG | Trans | "Ground Burn Out" |
| 1988 | Rockin'dex '88 | Victor | "Dog or Die" |
| 1988 | Selfish Video | Selfish | |
| 1990 | Japan Bashing volume 1 | Public Bath | "Discow Moscow" |
| 1990 | I'm Stupid | Beast 666 Tapes | "M 75" |
| 1991 | Yellow Power Scum | Beast 666 Tapes | "Nice B-O-R-E Guy & Boyoyo Touch", "Banned in O.S." |
| 1992 | Garbage Sandwich | Beast 666 Tapes | "Body Check #7", "The 69 69 Box", "Bore Bore '90", "Chainsaw Clinik" |
| 1993 | Trademark Of Quality 1993 | Reprise | "My Mum Is Car" |
| 1994 | Rock Stars Kill | Kill Rock Stars | "Pukulee & Rikulee" |
| 1994 | Dope Guns 'n Fucking in the Streets vol. 9 | Amphetamine Reptile | "Pukuri" |
| 1994 | Live vol 1 | KXLU 88.9 FM | jam of "Super Are You" |
| 1995 | The Geisha Girls Show | Gut / Forlife | "Nagomi" |
| 1995 | Bad Sun Rising II | Nippon Guitar | "Mangun" |
| 2001 | Sharin' in the Groove | Mockingbird Foundation | "Free (End of Session version)" |
| 2002 | Anima Mundi | WEA Japan | "Free (End of Session version)" |
