= Seiichi Yamamoto =

Japanese musician

- Also known as: Yama-motor
- Born: July 16, 1958 (age 67); Amagasaki, Hyōgo
- Origin: Osaka, Japan
- Genres: Noise rock, electronic
- Instrument(s): Guitar, vocals
- Years active: 1986–present
- Labels: Tzadik
- Member of: Rovo
- Formerly of: Boredoms

Seiichi Yamamoto (山本 精一, Yamamoto Seiichi; born July 16, 1958) is a Japanese musician. He is the guitarist of psychedelic rock band Rovo as well as a former guitarist for the noise rock band Boredoms, and has also released records as a solo artist. He has also composed the soundtracks to several films, as well as collaborating with various other musicians and bands.

== Discography ==
=== Solo projects ===
- Suido Megane Satsujin Jiken videocassette (Augen, 1994)
- Solo Improvisado videocassette (Augen, 1996)
- Noa (Alchemy, ARCD-101, 1998)
- Noa 2 (Alchemy, ARCD-125, 2001)
- Crown of Fuzzy Groove (Weather/P-Vine, 2002)
- Nu Frequency (Tzadik, 2003)
- Nazonazo (Ummo / MIDI Creative, 2003)
- Baptism (Tzadik, 2004)
- X-Game (as Para; P-Vine, 2006)
- Tokyo Loop: Original Soundtrack (Image Forum/P-Vine, 2006)

=== As co-leader ===
- Shiawase no Sumika with Phew (Tokuma Japan Communications, 1998)
- Ichi the Killer: Original Soundtrack (Monsoon, 2001)
- Ontoko with K.K. Null (Ummo, 1999)
- Dance with Philip Samartzis (FMN Sound Factory, 2002)
- Live at Showboat, February 25, 2000 with Lamones Young with Mukai, and Chie (Last Visible Dog/Hospital Productions, 2003)
- Hasselt with Enkidu (Turtles' Dream, 2004)
- Kirie: Kabusacki Tokyo Session with Kabusacki, Fernando, Yuji Katsui, Natsuki Kido, Yasuhiro Yoshigaki, Yoichi Okabe, and Takashi Numazawa (Glamorous, 2004)
- Chichipio: Buenos Aires Session vol. #1 (EWE, 2005)
- Izumi: Buenos Aires Session vol. #2 (EWE, 2006)

=== with Boredoms ===
- Osorezan no Stooges Kyo (1988, Selfish Records)
- Soul Discharge (1989, Selfish Records)
- Pop Tatari (1992, WEA Japan)
- Super Roots (1993, WEA Japan)
- Wow 2 (1993, Avant Records)
- Super Roots 2 (1994, WEA Japan)
- Chocolate Synthesizer (1994, WEA Japan)
- Super Roots 3 (1994, WEA Japan)
- Super Roots 5 (1995, WEA Japan)
- Super Roots 6 (1996, WEA Japan)
- Super Go!!!!! (1998, WEA Japan)
- Super æ (1998, WEA Japan)
- Super Seeeeee!!!!!! (1998, WEA Japan)
- Super 77/Super Sky (1998, WEA Japan)
- Super Roots 7 (1998, WEA Japan)
- Super Roots 8 (1999, WEA Japan)
- Vision Creation Newsun (EP) (1999, WEA Japan)
- Vision Creation Newsun (1999, WEA Japan)
- Rebore, vol. 1 (2000, WEA Japan)
- Rebore, vol. 2 (2000, WEA Japan)
- Rebore, vol. 3 (2001, WEA Japan)
- Rebore, vol. 0 (2001, WEA Japan)
- Seadrum/House of Sun (2004, WEA Japan)

Yamamoto had left Boredoms prior to the release of Seadrum/House of Sun; the album contains samples of previously recorded guitar work.

=== with Rovo ===
- Pico! (Dohb, 1998)
- Vitamin ! / Cisco ! (Roars, 1998)
- Horses ! / Kmara ! LP (Dohb, 1999)
- Imago (Dohb, 1999)
- Pyramid (Dohb, 2000)
- Sai (Warner Indies Network, 2001)
- split with Date Course Pentagon Royal Garden. (P-Vine, 2001)
- Live at Liquid Room 2001 5/16: Main Drive Trance (Rovolone, 2001)
- Tonic 2001 (Tzadik, 2002)
- Flage (Warner, 2002)
- Live at Hibiya-Yaon 2003. 05. 05: Man Drive Trance Special (Wonderground, 2003)
- Condor (2006)
- Live at Tokyo Kinema Club 7/7/2006 with Alejandro Franov, Fernando Kabusacki, and Santiago Vazquez (EWE, 2007)

=== with Omoide Hatoba ===
- Surfin' in U.F.O. (EP. Public Bath, 1990)
- Dai-Ongaku (Alchemy, 1990)
- Suichu-Joe (Alchemy, 1991)
- Black Hawaii (Alchemy, 1992)
- Famicom Rally I-V audiocassette (1993)
- Mantako (Public Bath, 1994)
- Livers and Giggers: 1987–1993 (Japan Overseas, 1994)
- Kinsei (Earthnoise/Meldac/Birdman 1995)
- Suger Clip (Trattoria / Polystar, 1997)
- Vuoy (Trattoria / Polystar, 1997)
- Osaka Ra (Dako Vinyl Fantasia, 2004)

=== with Rashinban ===
- Rashinban audiocassette (Gyuune, 1994)
- Bunka audiocassette (Gyuune, 1997)
- Rago (Gyuune, 1997)
- Eien no Uta. 3 (Warner Music Japan, 1997)
- Rago (Warner Music Japan, 1997)
- Seika (Warner Music Japan, 1998)
- Psychedelic Sessions for All Incredible Hippies I and II audiocassette
- Rashinban's Live Tips Collection Vol. 1: '97–'99 audiocassette
- Adrenalin Drive (Warner Music Japan, 1999)
- Song Line (Warner Music Japan, 2000)
- Soundtrack to Adrenalin Drive (Beam Entertainment, 2000)
- Psychederix: Impro and More Songs audiocassette
- Psychederix: Impro and More Songs: Nagoya Version audiocassette
- Musubi (Lighthouse, 2005)

=== with ya-to-i ===
- The Essence of Pop-Self (Flavour, 2002)

=== with Akabushi ===
- Chonmage 3" CD (Satsugai Enka Vinyl, 1994)
- Mademoiselle. Live: T-shirt Kote Kure with Bonjour! (Satugai Enka Vinyl, 1995)

=== with Guitoo ===
- Cyclotron (Warner Music Japan, 1999)

=== with Live Under the Sky ===
- Live Under the Sky audiocassette (F.M.N. Sound Factory)
- Live Under the Sky / Lost Utopia Total Sound audiocassette (Maboroshi no Sekai, 1995)
- Sky (F.M.N. Sound Factory, 1995)

=== with Novo Tono ===
- Panorama Paradise (Alida / Creativeman, 1996)
- Yoshihide Otomo plays the music of Takeo Yamashita (P-Vine, 1999) (two tracks)
- Live (2001)

=== with Ruinzhatova ===
- Ruins-Hatoba (Magaibutsu/Charnel Music, 1994)
- Ruins-Hatoba Show video (Magaibutsu, 1995)
- R H (Magaibutsu, reissue of first album, 2001)
- Close to the R H KIKI (Little Mor Rec., 2003)
- sampling CD KAERUCAFE Material Collection/RUINZHATOVA
- Live in Somewhere (Magaibutsu, 2006)

=== with Sun Kich ===
- Lucky Mountain Hey!!!!!!!!!!' (Japan Overseas, 1997)

=== with Most ===
- 2000.11.26. (2001)
- Most (P-Vine, 2001)
- Most Most (P-Vine, 2003)

=== with Guillotine Kyodai ===
- Memorial and Material audiocassette (Maboroshi no Sekai, 1996)
- Suspense Carry Pro (Guillotine / Doubletrap / Creativeman, 1997)
- Viva Guitar (Guillotine / Doubletrap / Creativeman, CMDD-00064, 1997)
- Meetings with Remarkable Men Featuring Junji Hirose (Guillotine / Tag Rag, 2000)

In addition to performing in these bands, Yamamoto has collaborated with dozens of other bands of varying genres.
