= Boretronix =

Boretronix 1

Studio album by Boredoms
- Released: 1988
- Genre: Noise
- Length: 47:44
- Label: Mega Scum Groove Inc. ? (?001)

Boredoms chronology
Osorezan no Stooges Kyo (1988)	Boretronix 1 (1988)	Boretronix 2 (1989)

Boretronix is the name of a series of obscure self-released cassette-only releases by Japanese noise rock band Boredoms, consisting of heavily edited recordings of rehearsals and live shows. Although four releases are documented, six are reported to exist, and only the first three are proven to exist after they were made available online. All were released in extremely limited quantities.

The name was later adopted by the Tokyo management company handling Boredoms, Boretronix Co. Ltd., helmed by Junko Futagawa. Its hourglass-shaped logo was used as the title for the live recording on the second CD of the limited-edition box set release of Vision Creation Newsun.

Boretronix 2

Studio album by Boredoms
- Released: 1989
- Genre: Noise rock
- Length: 50:33
- Label: ? (2002)

Boredoms chronology
Boretronix 1 (1988)	Boretronix 2 (1989)	Soul Discharge (1989)

Boretronix 3

Studio album by Boredoms
- Released: 1990
- Genre: Noise rock
- Length: 49:12
- Label: ? (2004)

Boredoms chronology
Michidai / Fuanteidai (1990)	Boretronix 3 (1990)	Pop Tatari (1992)

== Boretronix 1 ==
Mega Scum Groove Inc. pressed 100 copies; after it sold out, Eye rereleased it on his label ?.

- Side A
  1. "Hard Core Nunk" – 3:04
  2. "Boil Out UFO" – 2:48
  3. "Meat Bag" – 2:17
  4. "Chago-Hosh-Moop" – 1:54
  5. "Human Bad" – 2:46
  6. "Hipless Peer Group" – 2:40
  7. "Now" – 2:47
  8. "Club Gom" – 5:51
- Side B
  1. "Rising Vegas Gas-Moskeet" – 1:53
  2. "Blah Men" – 2:35
  3. "Mega Coke Mix" – 1:10
  4. "Hatefull 88'" – 1:42
  5. "Auck Off" – 1:44
  6. "Euck You Earhole" – 4:32
  7. "Web Wig" – 3:25
  8. "Eyehole Turfers" – 2:34
  9. "Hook Around" – 2:55
  10. "Frying Buttcave" – 1:07

== Boretronix 2 ==
Boretronix 2 was announced to contain cover songs of a fictitious band called Mau Mau Overload. It was also limited to 100 copies.

- side A – 25:20
- side B – 25:13

== Boretronix 3 ==
Boretronix 3 came in two versions—original, and a remix by Eye.

- side A – 24:25
- side B – 24:46

== Boretronix 4–6 ==
No discographies contain information regarding Boretronix 4 or confirming the existence of 5 and 6. A Best of Boretronix compilation release was scheduled by the Ecstatic Peace! label, but has not been released yet.
