= Onanie Bomb Meets the Sex Pistols =

Compilation album by Boredoms
- Released: April 25, 1994
- Genre: Noise rock
- Length: 44:39
- Label: WEA Japan Reprise/Warner Bros. Records (United States); 45636 Very Friendly (United Kingdom)

Boredoms chronology
Wow 2 (1993)	Onanie Bomb Meets the Sex Pistols (1994)	Chocolate Synthesizer (1994)

Professional ratings
Review scores
Source	Rating
AllMusic	3/5 stars
Pitchfork Media	(6.9/10)

Onanie Bomb Meets the Sex Pistols is a compilation record by the Japanese noise rock band Boredoms, released in 1994 in both Japan and the United States. It combines the band's first album, Osorezan no Stooges Kyo, with its first EP, Anal by Anal. It was rereleased in 2004 by Very Friendly Records in the United Kingdom.

== Track listing ==
1. "Wipe Out Shock Shoppers" – 0:21
2. "Boredom, Vs, Sdi" – 3:23
3. "We Never Sleep" – 2:10
4. "Bite My Bollocks" – 2:24
5. "Young Assouls" – 6:03
6. "Call Me God" – 3:18
7. "No Core Punk" – 1:11
8. "Lick'n Cock Boatpeople" – 5:11
9. "Melt Down Boogie" – 4:50
10. "Feedbackfuck" – 6:33
11. "Anal Eater" – 3:17
12. "God from Anal" – 3:09
13. "Born to Anal" – 2:42
