= Super Roots 8 =

EP by Boredoms
- Released: February 24, 1999
- Genre: Noise rock
- Length: 14:19
- Label: Warner Music Japan

Boredoms chronology
Super Go!!!!! (1998)	Super Roots 8 (1999)	Vision Creation Newsun EP (2001)

Professional ratings
Review scores
Source	Rating
AllMusic	3/5 stars
Pitchfork Media	8.2/10

Super Roots 8 is the 7th installment in the Super Roots EP series by noise rock band Boredoms, released in 1999 by Warner Music Japan.

The three tracks are all variations on the theme song to Kimba the White Lion. It was written by Tsuyoshi Ishigouka and Isao Tomita.

== Track listing ==
1. "Jungle Taitei" – 3:46
2. "Jungle Taitei (DJ Let's TRY & D.I.Y. - Drum Machine Mix)" (remixed by Eye) – 2:41
3. "Jungle Taitei (Laughter Robot's Hemp Mix)" (remixed by Yann Tomita) – 7:49

== Personnel ==
- Yamantaka Eye – mixing, vocals, ring chime
- Seiichi Yamamoto – guitar, percussion
- Hilah – bass guitar, percussion, vocals
- Yoshimi P-We – vocals, drums, djembe, keyboard
- ATR – djembe
- Eda – djembe
