= Dominique Leone =

American singer-songwriter

- Born: Dominique Salvador Leone
- Genres: Experimental pop
- Occupations: Composer, singer
- Instruments: Piano/synthesizer, drum kit, trumpet
- Years active: 2007–present
- Labels: Feedelity, Strømland, Important, Upcode
- Website: www.dominiqueleone.com

Dominique Leone is an American musician and writer based in New York City.

== Early life and education ==
Leone was born in Shreveport, Louisiana on December 29, 1973, and grew up in the Dallas, Texas area. He received a bachelor's degree in Music Performance in 1998 from Texas Tech University, focusing on classical trumpet.

== Career ==
=== As a musician ===
His first release as a musician was the Dominique Leone EP on Hans-Peter Lindstrøm's Feedelity label in 2007. In 2008, Lindstrøm and Smalltown Supersound's Joakim Haughland released Leone's first full-length CD on their Strømland label, with art by Kim Hiorthøy. American experimental music label Important Records released his second CD Abstract Expression in October 2009. He recorded and staged a version of Igor Stravinsky's Les Noces in 2011, and released the digital album San Francisco in 2015.

As a recording artist, Leone has been compared to Harry Nilsson, Brian Wilson, Boredoms, and XTC. His music has been described as containing "stubbornly original song structures and chord progressions", and British electronic pop musician Max Tundra noted that Leone is "one of the greatest practitioners of the chord progression". He has collaborated or performed with Kevin Blechdom, R. Stevie Moore, Lindstrøm, Mungolian Jet Set, Matmos, Cryptacize, Odawas, Bob Drake, William Winant, as well as contributing vocals and trumpet to Boredoms' Super Roots 10 release.

In 2010, Leone won Grand Prize in a Steve Reich remix contest, judged by the composer Reich himself, and celebrating the composer's 74th birthday.

=== As a music critic ===
Leone began writing music reviews for Pitchfork Media in 2001, and was a regular contributor until 2007. He has also written for Paste Magazine, All-Music Guide and Trouser Press.

As a music critic, Leone was known for championing modern experimental and fringe artists, as well as older electronic music, progressive rock, and psychedelia. For Pitchfork, Leone penned early reviews of Animal Collective, Devendra Banhart, as well as several for influential Japanese band the Boredoms. He also wrote frequently cited reviews of Can, Igor Wakhévitch, The Beach Boys, and for Trouser Press, a lengthy overview of France's Magma.

In 2007, Leone authored a monthly column for Pitchfork entitled "Out Music". He presented his paper "What You Hear is Never What They Heard, and What You Get is Never What They Had" at the 2007 Pop Conference at the Experience Music Project and Science Fiction Museum and Hall of Fame in Seattle, Washington.

== Discography ==
- Dominique Leone EP [Feedelity; 2007]
- Dominique Leone [Strømland; 2008]
- Abstract Expression [Important; 2009]
- Summer EP [Self-released; 2010]
- Winter EP [Upcode; 2011]
- Les Noces [Self-released; 2011]
- 365 Songs [Self-released; 2013]
- San Francisco [Self-released; 2015]
- Dad Rock [Self-released; 2019]
