= Z-Rock Hawaii =

Studio album by Z-Rock Hawaii
- Released: September 6, 1996
- Length: 52:02
- Label: Nipp Guitar

Ween chronology
12 Golden Country Greats (1996)	Z-Rock Hawaii (1996)	The Mollusk (1997)

Boredoms chronology
Super Roots 6 (1996)	Z-Rock Hawaii (1996)	Super Go!!!!! (1998)

Professional ratings
Review scores
Source	Rating
AllMusic	4.5/5 stars
Jrawk	(?)

Z-Rock Hawaii is the only album by Z-Rock Hawaii, released in 1996. The supergroup features Gene Ween, Dean Ween and Claude Coleman Jr. of Ween collaborating with Yamantaka Eye, Seiichi Yamamoto, Yoshimi P-We, and Yoshikawa Toyohito of Boredoms.

== History ==
In 1994, during the recording of Chocolate & Cheese, Gene Ween, Dean Ween and Claude Coleman Jr. of Ween collaborated with Japanese noise rock band Boredoms on a project released two years later as Z-Rock Hawaii. Melchiondo had become a big fan of Boredoms upon seeing them live in Philadelphia in 1993, calling them "the heaviest band [he] had ever seen since the Butthole Surfers". Prior to that, Boredoms frontman Yamantaka Eye had released an album that heavily sampled Ween's The Pod.

There were plans for a second Z-Rock Hawaii album in 2001, but no follow-up was ever recorded.

== Track listing ==
All tracks are written by Ween & Boredoms except noted.

Z-Rock Hawaii
No.	Title	Writer(s)	Vocals	Length
1.	"Chuggin'"		Yamantaka Eye	2:51
2.	"Bad to the Bone"	George Thorogood & The Destroyers	Gene Ween, Eye	3:45
3.	"In the Garden"		G Ween	4:23
4.	"Love Like Cement"		G Ween, Eye	2:00
5.	"Touchus"		Eye, G Ween	3:10
6.	"Piledriver"		Dean Ween, Eye	3:36
7.	"I Get a Little Taste of You"		G Ween, Eye	2:23
8.	"God in My Bed"		G Ween, Eye	3:43
9.	"The Meadow"		G Ween, Eye	7:18
10.	"Sunset Over Osaka"			6:31
Total length:				52:02

Bonus tracks
No.	Title	Length
1.	"Hexagon"	5:10
2.	"The Z-Wrap"	4:47
Total length:		1:01:59

== Personnel ==
- Gene Ween - vocals, guitar, keyboards
- Dean Ween - vocals, guitar, bass guitar
- Claude Coleman Jr. - drum machine, percussion
- Yamantaka Eye - screaming, programming
- Seiichi Yamamoto - guitar
- Yoshimi P-We - keyboards, horns
- Yoshikawa Toyohito - drums
