= Hifana =

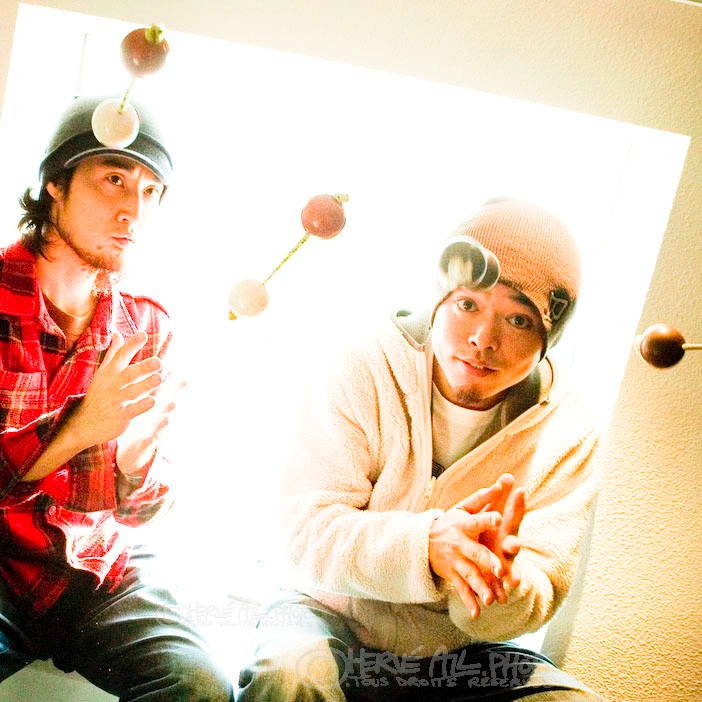
- Juicy and Keizo playing with asalato in 2008

Background information
- Origin: Kichijōji, Tokyo, Japan
- Genres: Breakbeat, hip hop, turntablism, trip hop
- Years active: 1998–present
- Label: W+K Tokyo Lab
- Members: Keizo Fukuda, Jun Miyata
- Website: hifana.com

Hifana (ハイファナ, Haifana; "South Winds" in the Okinawan dialect) is a Japanese breakbeat musical duo, consisting of KEIZOmachine! (Keizo Fukuda) and Juicy (Jun Miyata). The group formed in 1998, in the Tokyo neighbourhood of Kichijōji.

== History ==
Prior to forming as Hifana, the duo were collaborating with Yamatsuka Eye (front man for Boredoms) in a "belly-dancing percussion group" called Tribal Circus, and they released a self-titled album in 2000.

Hifana's first album, Fresh Push Breakin' (2003) included a music video for the track "Fatbros", for which they won the 2004 Space Shower Music Video Award for "Best CG / Animation". Their second album, Channel H (2005), came with 15 music tracks and 13 music videos, for which the track "Wamono" won the 2005 Japan Media Arts Festival Excellence Award. In 2008 they released a third album, Connect, which included 8 music tracks and 15 videos segments. Their fourth album, 24H, was released in early 2010, and contained 12 music tracks and 12 music videos.

As Hifana, their albums are released on the ad agency Wieden+Kennedy’s independent music label, W+K Tokyo Lab. The visuals for their music videos are created by a collaboration of Juicy, +cruz (Eric Cruz, creative director for W+K Tokyo Lab), VJ Gec (a group of audio-visual creators and graphic designers), and Maharo (illustrator).

They frequently collaborate with other musicians and artists, and have curated a series of Zamurai Mix Up parties. In 2004, the Zamurai 5 event was filmed by Space Shower TV and edited into the DVD Zamurai TV (2005), featuring music from Hifana, DJ Kentaro, Afra, Tucker, and Gagle. The packaging for the box was designed by Kymgym, a member of VJ Gec.

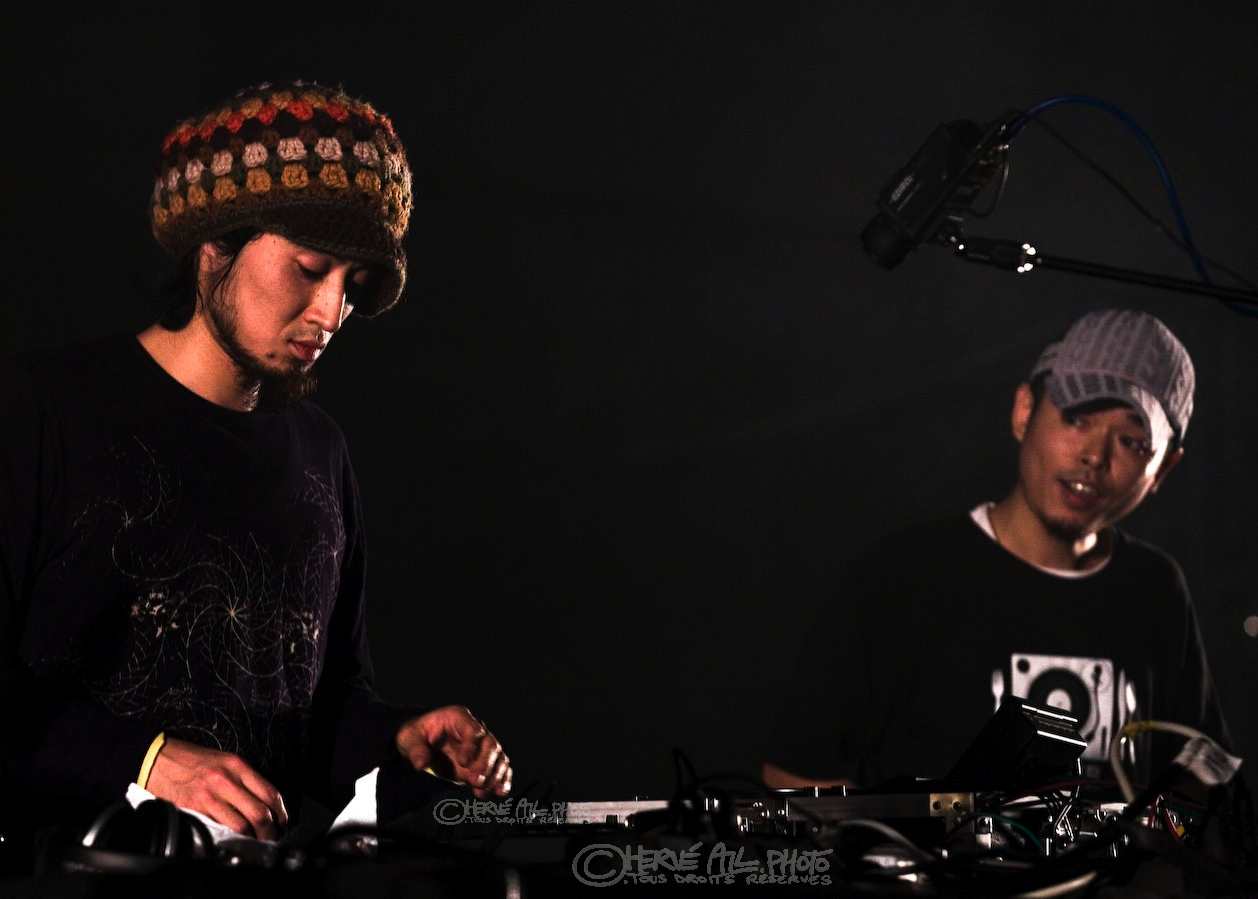
Hifana playing at the 2008 Transmusicales festival.

Hifana have performed at various music festivals, including the Fuji Rock Festival and Sonarsound in 2004, Sónar and the New York–Tokyo Music Festival in 2006, and on the main stage of the Transmusicales festival in 2008.

The group also run their own label called Nampooh, through which they have released two compilation albums of other musicians, Hifana presents Nampooh Cable (2006) and Hifana presents Nampooh Cable 2 (2009).

== Music ==
Hifana are notable for using a variety of devices and instruments, both in the studio, and during their live performances which they play without pre-recordings, including: turntables, Akai MPC sampler, Roland HandSonic (percussion multi-pad), DJM-909 battle mixer, DJM-800 mixer, and DVJ (DVD/CD) decks which they helped to develop with Pioneer, and a percussion set with timbales, cymbals, woodblocks and cowbells. They also pass the time playing with pairs of asalato, a West African percussion instrument.

== Discography ==
Albums:

- Fresh Push Breakin', 2003, W+K Tokyo Lab (CD + DVD-V)
- Channel H, 2005, W+K Tokyo Lab/3D (CD + DVD)
- Connect, 2007, W+K Tokyo Lab/EMI (CD + DVD-V)
- 24H, 2010, W+K Tokyo Lab/EMI (CD + DVD)

Other releases:

- Sound Touchable, 2002, Kohma (LP, a battle record)
- Zamurai TV, 2005, 3D System
- Hifana presents Nampooh Cable, 2006, Sony/Columbia (CD compilation of various artists)
- Harvest Dance, 2007, Beat Records (CD maxi single)
- Hifana presents Nampooh Cable 2, 2009, EMI Music Japan (CD compilation of various artists)
- Sound Touchable 2, 2010, Ground Riddim Japan (LP, a battle record)
- Zamurai TV 2, 2010, EMI Music Japan
