= Yoshimi and Yuka =

Japanese musical duo

- Origin: Japan
- Genres: Experimental; Ambient; Avant-garde
- Years active: 2003
- Labels: Ipecac Recordings
- Past members: Yoshimi P-We; Yuka Honda

Yoshimi and Yuka was a collaboration between musicians Yoshimi P-We (of Boredoms, OOIOO, UFO or Die et al.) and Yuka Honda (solo artist and member of Cibo Matto). They released their only album to date, Flower With No Color on Ipecac Recordings in April 2003. It was an ambient project which combined field recordings, keyboards and studio work to form a very sedate and abstract album.

== Discography ==
- "Flower with No Color" - Ipecac Recordings - 2003
