= Gold and Green (OOIOO album) =

Studio album by OOIOO
- Released: September 6, 2000
- Genre: Neo-psychedelia, experimental rock
- Length: 53:20
- Label: Shock City/Trattoria, Ape Sounds, Thrill Jockey

OOIOO chronology
Feather Float (1999)	Gold and Green (2000)	Kila Kila Kila (2003)

Professional ratings
Aggregate scores
Source	Rating
Metacritic	81/100
Review scores
Source	Rating
AllMusic	3.5/5 stars
Mojo	3.5/5 stars
Playlouder	4/5 stars
Stylus	B
Uncut	8/10
URB	4/5 stars
Under the Radar	7/10

Gold and Green is the third album by the Japanese band OOIOO, a side-project of Boredoms member Yoshimi P-We.

== Track listing ==
No.	Title	Length
1.	"moss trumpeter"	3:04
2.	"てくてくtune"	2:53
3.	"Grow Sound Tree"	6:51
4.	"mountain book"	7:04
5.	"I’m a song"	7:45
6.	"fossil"	3:48
7.	"ina吹くの森"	3:24
8.	"unu"	0:51
9.	"idbi"	0:37
10.	"木6列車"	5:13
11.	"emeraldragonfly"	7:21
12.	"return to NOW!!!"	4:30

== Personnel ==
=== OOIOO ===
- Yoshimi P-We - vocals, guitars, trumpet, flute, keyboards, synths, wind chimes, drums, percussion
- Maki - bass
- Yoshico - drums, maracas, programming
- Kayano - guitar, vocals

=== Guests ===
Gold and Green contains many guest artists, most notably Sean Lennon and Yuka Honda.

- Kyoko - vocals (tracks 4, 6, 11)
- Yoshida Atuhisa - bass, santoor (track 4)
- Seiichi Yamamoto - production (track 4)
- Sean Lennon - backing vocals (track 4)
- Yuka Honda - piano (track 4)
- Yuzawa Hironori - tabla (track 4), kanjira (track 11)
- L?K?O - turntables (tracks 7, 12)
- Atari - congas (track 11)

=== Production ===
- Hara Kouichi - Engineer, Mixing
- Wayama Hiroko - Executive Producer
- Koizumi Yuka - Mastering
- Yoshimi P-We - Mixing, Producer

=== Artwork ===
- Cover Work - Miyano Tayuka (& Grafika) & Yoshimi P-We
- Guidebook Drawing - Fukuta Seigo
- Photography - Yoshimi P-We

== Releases information ==
Region	Date	Label	Format	Catalog
Japan	September 6, 2000	Shock City	CD	007 PSCR-5912
Japan	December 12, 2001	Ape Sounds	LP	ASVL-005
United States	September 2004	Thrill Jockey	CD	160
