= Yunnan Colorfree =

Soundtrack album by Yoshimio
- Released: November 21, 2007
- Genre: Soundtrack
- Label: Commmons
- Producer: Yoshimio

Yunnan Colorfree is a solo album by Yoshimi P-We (Boredoms/OOIOO/Free Kitten) under the name Yoshimio. The music is a soundtrack to a documentary movie of the same name; the movie focuses on the women of Yunnan, a remote area in southern China—near Tibet, Laos, Myanmar and Vietnam. The album contains guest vocals by Kim Gordon of Sonic Youth as well as a cover of the Sonic Youth track "Death Valley '69".

The album was released as Japanese-only exclusive, packaged in deluxe 2-disc gatefold digipak. The first disc is a CD containing the soundtrack. The second disc is a DVD containing the entire 42 minute film.

== Track listing ==
=== CD ===
1. "Open Our Lotus" – (1:43)
2. "Iiie" – (2:15)
3. "Myaoo" – (2:43)
4. "Taiii" – (1:43)
5. "Grounding Session I" – (1:49)
6. "Grounding Session II" – (0:30)
7. "Honey" – (0:32)
8. "Ararah" – (8:34)
9. "Endless" – (3:13)
10. "Sunny" – (1:56)
11. "Chuwow" – (1:17)
12. "Mochiii" – (2:40)
13. "Tori no Jidai" – (9:53)
14. "Death Valley 69 (Saicobaba Version)" – (5:16)
15. "Gyariii" – (0:23)

=== DVD ===
1. "Opening"
2. "I People"
3. "Myao People"
4. "Tai People"
5. "Hani People"
6. "R People"
7. "Yao People"
8. "Sani People"
9. "Chuwan People"
10. "Moci People"

== Personnel ==
Music by Yoshimi P-We

- Yoshimi P-We –
  - steel guitar (1, 4)
  - vocal (2, 8, 9, 11, 13, 14)
  - shell (2)
  - synthesizer (2, 9)
  - keyboard (2, 3, 8–10, 12–14)
  - drum machine (3, 4)
  - cowbell (3)
  - shaker (3, 4, 13)
  - electric guitar (4)
  - triangle (4)
  - taiko (5–7)
  - boo (5–7)
  - wood block (5–7, 13)
  - Glockenspiel (5–7, 13)
  - drums (8, 13)
  - bell (8)
  - whistle (8)
  - duff (8)
  - gamelan (11)
  - electric bass guitar (11)
  - vibratone (11)
  - handclap (11)
  - frog drum (11)
  - trumpet (13)
  - tambourine (13)
  - foot bass (14)
  - bass drum (14)

=== Guest performers ===
- Yo2ro Takekawa – duff (2, 9), manjira (5–7), kanjira (5–7), tambourine (5–7, 11), drums (9–12, 14), cowbell (10)
- Kim Gordon – vocal (5–7, 14), electric guitar (5–7), guitar (5–7)
- Sen10 – talking tom (5–7)
- Shoji – underground recording (5–7), bowl (8), keyboard (8, 13), field recording (8, 13), pin (15)
- Uta – vocal (8, 13, 15), bowl (8)
- Yoshidadaikiti – sitar (14)

=== Production ===
Produced and mixed by Yoshimio
Engineered by Koichi Hara at Redragonfly Studio
Mastered by Isao Kikuchi at Warner Music Mastering

Artwork by Shoji Goto
Photograph by Miwaco

== Documentary film ==
The soundtrack is accompanied by DVD containing the documentary film. The film consists of various street shots of these Yunnan woman—in the markets, looking at food, in the fields and just standing around in total elegance, in the most colorful clothing imaginable—with no-narration or overt linear intention.

- Filmed by Kim Sung-yoon
- Edited by Kumiko Kamanaka
- Sound produced by Yoshimio
