= Olaibi =

OLAibi
- OLAibi "New Rain" (2012)

Background information
- Origin: Osaka, Japan
- Genres: Experimental rock, post-rock
- Years active: 2006-2023
- Labels: Felicity, Polystar, sunet
- Website: OLAibi home page

OLAibi was a Japanese percussion-based experimental music project by AI from Osaka, ex-member of OOIOO who regularly works with Takagi Masakatsu. In her music, OLAibi incorporates ancient Okinawan influences and uses steel drums, pianica, exotic percussion instruments. Since her childhood, AI was deeply inspired and mesmerized by Africa, and discovering Western African drums in later years mainly triggered her further musical activities.

In 2006, OLAibi produced the debut "Humming Moon Drip" album, released by Polystar and created with the assistance of Yoshimi P-We. It was recorded with an emphasis on various hand drums (conga, djembe, bougarabou), all tuned differently to be able to express anything, from melody to bass line.

Following OOIOO, OLAibi was signed by Japanese label Felicity, which produced her second album Tingaruda in January 2009. Produced entirely by AI handling everything from vocals to drums, this mysterious blend of ethnic minimalism pop and downtempo featured kalimba, guitar, organ, whistles and other instruments performed with innovative, avant-garde percussive approach. A critically acclaimed third release entitled New Rain, presented by Felicity in Oct 2012, included a diverse list of prominent collaborators and featured guests: Takagi Masakatsu, Japanese guitarist Hanaregumi (Takashi Nagazumi), Shibuya-kei star Kahimi Karie, Aya from OOIOO, and Oorutaichi (Taichi Moriguchi).

In 2013, AI left Tokyo and moved with her family to the desolated jungle to live in seclusion. Following constant traveling with OOIOO across Japan and around the world and other non-stop activities, she decided to quit the band and focused on OLAibi as her solo output. With her family members, she gradually built a foot pedestal and hut in the forest, which later became an outdoor studios and new home-base to produce and present music. In 2017, OLAibi launched new label sunet and released new album みみはわす (Mimihawasu) to commemorate this.

On October 10, 2023, AI died after a long illness.

== Discography ==
- Humming Moon Drip / ハミング・ムーン・ドリップ - (2006)
- Tingaruda / ティンガルーダ - (2009)
- New Rain / ニューレイン - (2012)
- Mi-mi wa wasu / みみはわす - (2017)
