= We Gave It All Away... Now We Are Taking It Back =

Remix album by Mungolian Jet Set
- Released: August 25, 2009
- Genre: House
- Label: Smalltown Supersound

Mungolian Jet Set chronology
Beauty Came to Us in Stone (2006)	We Gave It All Away... Now We Are Taking It Back (2009)

Professional ratings
Review scores
Source	Rating
Allmusic	link
Pitchfork Media	8.1/10 link
Resident Advisor	link
Uncut	link

We Gave It All Away... Now We Are Taking It Back is the second album by Mungolian Jet Set. It is a double album mostly composed of heavily modified remixes with a handful of original tracks.

== Track list ==
Disc 1: We Gave It All Away...
No.	Title	Original artist	Length
1.	"Y Lenotokone Mungo"	Mungolian Jet Set	2:05
2.	"Creepy"	Mungolian Jet Set	9:28
3.	"Could You Be Loved"	Pizzy Yelliot	4:41
4.	"Madre Epics Part 2"	Mungolian Jet Set	7:38
5.	"It Ain't Necessarily Evil"	Mari Boine	7:38
6.	"Big Smack and Flies - Medievel Knievel mix"	Ronny and Renzo	8:38
7.	"A Blast of Loser - 9406 Version"	Lindstrøm	8:21
8.	"Clairevoyage"	Mungolian Jet Set's 16th Rebels of Mung feat. Lindstrøm and Dominique Leone	10:46

Disc 2: And Now We Are Taking It Back
No.	Title	Original artist	Length
1.	"Whatever Keeps Your Daisies n Glory"	Mungolian Jet Set	1:00
2.	"Ocean 0304 - Cruisin with the Henleys Mix"	Athana	7:33
3.	"Murky Lambada - Mungs Lambada"	Eivind Aarset	8:26
4.	"A Thrilling Mungophony in Two Parts"	Ost & Kjex	10:57
5.	"Darker - Metro Mix"	Nils Petter Molvaer	6:15
6.	"Original Highway Delight - Miami Camp Mix"	LSB	6:14
7.	"Glitches n Bugs - Awaiian Spaces Version AM"	The Shortwave Set	7:57
8.	"Moon Song (The Gospel According To Mung) - 2012 Live @ The Hacienda Version"	They Came from the Stars	10:53
