= Flower with No Color =

Studio album by Yoshimi and Yuka
- Released: April 8, 2003
- Genre: Ambient
- Length: 55:47
- Label: Ipecac Recordings (IPC34)

Professional ratings
Review scores
Source	Rating
Allmusic	link
Dusted Magazine	(not rated) link

Flower with No Color is the collaborative album by artists Yoshimi P-We (best known for as the drummer of Boredoms) and Yuka Honda (best known as half of Cibo Matto) as Yoshimi and Yuka. Flower with No Color was released in 2003 (see 2003 in music) on Ipecac Recordings, and contains 7 songs.

== Track listing ==
1. "UMEgination" – 4:29
2. "Ha Wa ii Na" – 3:14
3. "KoRoKoKoRo'N Insects" – 1:41
4. "SPY said ONE" – 9:31
5. "La Donna Ni Demo Des Kinna" – 7:27
6. "Mow Deck In Eye" – 27:12
7. "elegant bird" – 2:13

== Personnel ==
- Yoshimi P-We - Percussions & Drums, Grang Tang, Guitar, Piano, Trumpet, Keyboard Synthesizer, Bamboo Flute, Whistle
- Yuka Honda - Piano, Chorus & Vocal, Bass Guitar, Keyboard Synthesizer, Electric Piano
