= Vision Creation Newsun (EP) =

EP by Boredoms
- Released: September 29, 1999
- Genre: Noise rock
- Length: 43:32
- Label: Warner Music Japan

Boredoms chronology
Super Roots 8 (1999)	Vision Creation Newsun (1999)	Vision Creation Newsun (1999)

Vision Creation Newsun EP (sometimes written Vision△Creation△Newsun△ and often mislabeled as Sunsidal Cendencies) is the shortened version of the studio album of the same name by the Japanese experimental rock band Boredoms.

== Track listing ==
1. "Sunsidal Cendencies" – 8:49 (remix of "◯")
2. "Moonsidal Cendencies (Moochy remix)" – 10:12
3. "11 Aug '99 Live (Total Eclipse + Grand Cross)/Uoredoms" – 24:31

== Personnel ==
- Yamantaka Eye – mixing, vocals, synthesizer, sampling, turntable
- Yamamoto Seiichi – guitar
- Hiyashi Hira – bass guitar, effects
- Yoshimi P-We – drums, percussion, vocals, keyboard
- ATR – drums, percussion, synthesizer
- EDA – drums, percussion, synthesizer
- Izumi Kiyoshi – synthesizer, sampling
