= Live at Sunflancisco =

Video by Boredoms
- Released: December 19, 2007
- Recorded: The Independent, San Francisco, California, May 19, 2005
- Genre: Noise rock
- Length: 65:23 (DVD); 11:26 (CD)
- Label: Commmons

Boredoms chronology
Super Roots 9 (2007)	Live at Sunflancisco (2007)	Voaltz / Relerer (2008)

Live at Sunflancisco is a live video by Japanese noise rock band Boredoms, released in 2007 by Commmons in a DVD+CD set. The live footage was shot in San Francisco, California during the band's 2005 tour of the United States while the CD contains two brief studio tracks.

== Track listing ==
DVD

1. Boredoms live at The Independent, San Francisco – 65:23

CD

1. "U-BUS" – 4:18
2. "Relerer" – 7:08

== Personnel ==
- Yamantaka Eye – turntables, DJing, vocals
- Yoshimi P-We – drums, vocals
- Atari – drums
- Yojiro – drums
- Junko Futagawa – filming
- Koichi Hara – engineering
- Isao Kikuchi – mastering
- Ryuichi Tanaka – authoring engineering
