= Eye Remix =

Remix album by OOIOO
- Released: January 1, 2007
- Label: Thrill Jockey

Professional ratings
Review scores
| Source | Rating |
|---|---|
| Allmusic | 3.5/5 stars |

Eye Remix (stylised as OOEYヨOO -EYヨ REMIX) is EP of remixes by the Japanese band OOIOO by Boredoms member Yamantaka Eye (a.k.a. EYヨ). Originally handed out while touring in the US for the Taiga album, the EP contains two remixes by EYヨ using two Taiga tracks (UMO and UMA) as source material.

== Track listing ==
| No. | Title | Length |
|---|---|---|
| 1. | "EYヨ MIX 1" | 5:34 |
| 2. | "EYヨ MIX 2" | 5:20 |
| 3. | "UMO" (Original Version) | 3:30 |
| 4. | "UMA" (Original Version) | 3:38 |

== Personnel ==
- Yoshimi P-We - vocals, guitar, drums
- Kayan - guitar
- Aya - bass
- Ai - drums
- Yamantaka Eye - remixer

== Releases information ==
| Region | Date | Label | Format | Catalog |
|---|---|---|---|---|
| United States | 2007 | Thrill Jockey | LP | 70171 |
| United States | 2007 | Thrill Jockey | CD | 171 |
| Japan | 2007 | Felicity | CD | MTCD1076 |
