= Armonico Hewa =

Studio album by OOIOO
- Released: August 5, 2009
- Genre: Psychedelic rock
- Length: 46:53
- Labels: Commmons; Shock City
- Producer: Yoshimi P-We

OOIOO chronology
Eye Remix (2007)	Armonico Hewa (2009)	Gamel (2013)

Professional ratings
Aggregate scores
Source	Rating
AnyDecentMusic?	6.9/10
Metacritic	74/100
Review scores
Source	Rating
AllMusic	4/5 stars
Drowned in Sound	7/10
NME	8/10
Pitchfork	7.4/10
PopMatters	7/10
Tiny Mix Tapes	2.5/5
Uncut	3/5 stars
XLR8R	8/10

Armonico Hewa is the sixth studio album by Japanese experimental rock band OOIOO. It was released on August 5, 2009 by the labels Commmons and Shock City.

"Armonico Hewa" is a combination of the Spanish word "armonico" and the Swahili word "hewa". The band defines the combination of words as "air in a harmonious state".

== Track listing ==
All tracks are written by Yoshimi P-We, except where noted.

No.	Title	Writer(s)	Length
1.	"SOL"		2:21
2.	"Uda Hah"		6:31
3.	"Irorun"		4:32
4.	"Konjo"		1:26
5.	"Ulda"		6:25
6.	"Polacca"		7:53
7.	"Kipepeo"		2:32
8.	"O O I A H"		3:13
9.	"Nin Na Yama"		2:29
10.	"Hewa Hewa"		1:29
11.	"Agacim"		1:59
12.	"Orokai"		3:20
13.	"Honki Ponki"	Lale Oraloğlu; Metin Moss; Şerif Yüzbaşıoğlu	2:43
Total length:			46:53

== Personnel ==
Credits are adapted from the album's liner notes.

OOIOO

- Ai
- Aya
- Kayan
- Yoshimi P-We

Production

- Koichi Hara – engineering
- Isao Kikuchi – mastering
- Yoshimi P-We – production

Design

- Shoji Goto – drawing
- Uta – drawing
- Yoshimi P-We – artwork

== Charts ==
Chart (2009)	Peak position
US World Albums (Billboard)	15

== Release history ==
Region	Date	Format(s)	Label(s)	Catalog no.	Ref.
Japan	August 5, 2009	CD	Commmons; Shock City	RZCM-46308	
United States	October 20, 2009	CD; LP	Thrill Jockey	thrill 222	
