= Destroy 2 =

Album

- Also known as: Eye & Chew
- Origin: Osaka, Japan
- Genres: Noise rock Hardcore punk
- Years active: 1995–1996
- Label: Japan Overseas
- Past members: Yamantaka Eye; Chew Hasegawa

Destroy 2 (sometimes called Eye & Chew) was a short-lived Japanese noise rock band. Consisting of only two members, Yamantaka Eye of Boredoms (vocals) and Chew Hasegawa of Corrupted (drums), they released one recording in 1996 called We Are Voice and Rhythm Only. This was a live recording of a concert in Osaka done as a support for Brutal Truth on their Japanese tour in February 1995. Despite running for a little over 10 minutes, it features 48 songs, the longest of which is "24H?" at a runtime of 39 seconds. The structure of the songs typically consists of Eye introducing the track title, Hasegawa playing his part with Eye performing over it, and Eye closing the track with "Fuck off!" The album includes two cover versions: "Beastie Boys" (from the 1982 Beastie Boys EP Pollywog Stew) and "Nazi Punks Fuck Off!" (originally by Dead Kennedys), although the songs have been reduced to one verse and one chorus to fit into 18 and 17 seconds, respectively.

== We Are Voice and Rhythm Only ==
1. "Destroy 2 Theme" – 0:27
2. "Standing Piss is Legal" – 0:15
3. "Tired Core" – 0:16
4. "Cold Beer or Hot Beer" – 0:25
5. "Fuck System" – 0:15
6. "We Got a Jazz" – 0:06
7. "Fuck You 1995" – 0:10
8. "Pay Buy Boy" – 0:13
9. "Beastie Boys" – 0:18
10. "9 is 6" – 0:23
11. "Go" – 0:17
12. "Noise & Stop" – 0:06
13. "Destroy Gym" – 0:19
14. "Meat Grind Test (R.I.P. Concrete Octopus)" – 0:26
15. "No" – 0:07
16. "Super Ape" (Dub) – 0:13
17. "Anarchy Boy" – 0:09
18. "Sky" [Eco Core] – 0:07
19. "Sea" [Eco Core] – 0:04
20. "Earth" [Eco Core] – 0:04
21. "Ax Hx F.O." – 0:14
22. "Over Eat – 0:13
23. "Heaven" – 0:12
24. "Hell" – 0:10
25. "Shit" – 0:07
26. "Bull Shit" – 0:02
27. "Maybe Shit" – 0:02
28. "Maybe Bull Shit" – 0:07
29. "Shit World" – 0:10
30. "World Shit" – 0:13
31. "Die Punk" – 0:21
32. "Nazi Punks Fuck Off!" – 0:17
33. "Life is Eat & Die" – 0:10
34. "24H?" – 0:39
35. "Record Shop Die" – 0:13
36. "Osaka Most Wanted" – 0:10
37. "Straight Outta Tani-9" – 0:17
38. "Ax Bx Cx Dx Rx Ix" – 0:23
39. "Stick Down" – 0:08
40. "Stick Down Again" – 0:01
41. "Stick Up" – 0:01
42. "Stick Up Never Again" – 0:03
43. "Mic Down" – 0:03
44. "Mic Up" – 0:05
45. "Destroy 2" – 0:05
46. "Destroy 3" – 0:05
47. "Destroy 10" – 0:14
48. "Destroy Nothing" – 0:35
