= Taiga (OOIOO album) =

Studio album by OOIOO
- Released: July 4, 2006
- Genre: Experimental rock; world; avant-garde; experimental pop
- Length: 58:00
- Label: Felicity; Polystar; Shock City
- Producer: Yoshimi P-We

OOIOO chronology
Kila Kila Kila (2003)	Taiga (2006)	Eye Remix (2007)

Taiga is the fifth studio album by Japanese experimental rock band OOIOO. It was released on July 4, 2006 by the labels Felicity, Polystar and Shock City. It is an avant-rock and experimental pop album that blends numerous world music influences, particularly African music.

Taiga is the first OOIOO album to feature Ai on drums, while Aya returns on bass after her debut on the band's previous album Kila Kila Kila (2003). The songs "UMA" and "UMO" were remixed on OOIOO's 2007 EP Eye Remix.

== Title ==
The English word "taiga" refers to a subarctic zone of evergreen coniferous forests, while the Japanese word taiga (大河) means "(great) river". One reviewer described these as "apt descriptions" for OOIOO's "jungle-like music".

== Music ==
Taiga is centred on percussion, with guitar, keyboard and horn bedrocks being flavoured by conga drums, steel pans and xylophone. While the album takes influence from numerous global musical styles, much of the music takes influence from African music, with numerous tracks – particularly "KMS" – drawing from African jazz and "lilting African folk-inspired guitar melodies". "KMS" is flavoured by hand drums, jazz rhythms and guitar riffs. "SAI" is built on a sloping beat, patient organ and flute melodies. "ATS" sees the group explore gamelan and psychedelic rock, while "GRS" is a calypso track with heavy drum rolls. "UMA" is driven by heavy tom-toms and rhythmic chanting. "UJA" uses hand percussion in a manner that has been compared to the Art Ensemble of Chicago. Music critic Sam Mickens highlighted the group's "paradoxically formless pop sensibility; while the music's building blocks are primarily beautiful and often familiar feeling (harmonizing guitar lines, Yoshimi's deft trumpet, singing that's rooted in Japanese folk tradition, etc.), the way in which they are utilized and arranged works more in the vein of ancient trance musics or 20th-century minimalism."

== Critical reception ==
Professional ratings
Aggregate scores
Source	Rating
Metacritic	78/100
Review scores
Source	Rating
AllMusic	4.5/5 stars
The Independent	5/5 stars
Pitchfork	4.8/10
PopMatters	9/10
Spin	3/5 stars
The Stranger	3/4 stars
Stylus Magazine	B
Uncut	4/5 stars

At Metacritic, which assigns a normalized rating out of 100 to reviews from mainstream publications, Taiga has received an average score of 78, based on nine reviews, indicating "generally favorable reviews".

AllMusic's Heather Phares deemed it the group's "most mature album yet", describing it as an "inspired, eclectic mix of sounds and textures" which is enhanced by sophisticated arrangements and effective performances. She also noted the group's "magpie-like" tendency to weave interesting sounds from international cultures "into what feels like world music from an alternate universe". Andy Gill of The Independent described it as an extraordinary album of "uncompromising, absorbing avant-rock" that resembles a "neo-primitivist garage band" playing the music of Henry Cow, Frank Zappa, Faust and the Residents. Cameron MacDonald of Stylus Magazine wrote of the group's "deft" experimentation with numerous genres and noted how the album "continues the band's previous excursions into tribal percussion and cartoon-core melodrama." He wrote that "[t]he language barrier and discord makes the record incomprehensible, but nearly everything is still as intoxicating and entertaining as hell."

PopMatters reviewer Matt Cibula wrote that while the music is difficult, it is "awfully cuddly and adorable" for "avant-garde multi-genre music from Japan". Sam Mickens of The Stranger wrote that, on Tagia, "OOIOO's blissful-experimental-pop-as-hypnosis MO is purer and simpler than ever", highlighting a "a sense of gradual, natural, concerted development". D. Strauss of Spin wrote that the album's "brilliant" nature emerges from its unlikely musical fusions, highlighting the segue between favela beats on "UMA" and Canterbury scene on "KMS", and the mixture of girl group music, Steve Reich minimalism and the Mission: Impossible theme on "SAI".

A more reserved review came from Grayson Haver Currin of Pitchfork, who felt that "in small doses, Taiga is still inspired and moving, sweet even", but that over 58 minutes, the listener "gets sick sampling chunks from two-dozen flavors [of music]".

== Track listing ==
All tracks are written by Yoshimi P-We.

No.	Title	Length
1.	"UMA"	3:40
2.	"KMS"	9:02
3.	"UJA"	7:52
4.	"GRS"	3:46
5.	"ATS"	8:10
6.	"SAI"	15:05
7.	"UMO"	3:34
8.	"IOA"	6:51
Total length:		58:00

== Personnel ==
Credits are adapted from the album's liner notes.

OOIOO

- Ai
- Aya
- Kayan
- Yoshimi P-We

Additional musicians

- Thiam Misato – percussion
- Yo2ro Tatekawa – drums
- Tonchi – steelpan

Production

- Koichi Hara – engineering
- Mitsuo Koike – mastering
- Yoshimi P-We – production

Design

- Shoji Goto – artwork

== Release history ==
Region	Date	Format	Label	Catalog no.	Ref.
Japan	July 4, 2006	CD	Felicity	cap-60	
Japan	July 4, 2006	CD	Polystar	MTCD-1068	
Japan	July 4, 2006	CD	Shock City	SHOCKCITY-009	
United States	September 12, 2006	CD	Thrill Jockey	thrill 161	
