= Super Roots 7 =

EP by Boredoms
- Released: 1998
- Genre: Krautrock; psychedelic rock; noise rock
- Length: 33:11
- Label: Warner Music Japan

Boredoms chronology
Super æ (1998)	Super Roots 7 (1998)	Super 77/Super Sky (1998)

Professional ratings
Review scores
Source	Rating
AllMusic	4/5 stars
Pitchfork Media	8.2/10

Super Roots 7 is the sixth installment in the Super Roots EP series by noise rock band Boredoms, released in 1998 by Warner Music Japan. The band included a credit for "Super thanks to the Mekons," whose song "Where Were You?" influenced the release.

== Track listing ==
1. "7~ (Ewe Remix)" – 4:04
2. "7→ (Boriginal)" – 20:55
3. "7+ (Eye Remix)" – 8:12

== Personnel ==
- Yamantaka Eye – vocals, synthesizer, sound effects, electronics, audio mixing, editing, artwork
- Yoshimi P-We – drums, vocals, Casio keyboard
- Yamamotor – guitar
- ATR – drums, samples, percussion
- E-da – drums, electronic percussion
- Kiyoshi Izumi – samples, synthesizer
- Hilah – bass guitar, sound effects
- O. G. Hayashi – recording, audio engineering
- Masayo Takise – audio mastering
