= Rebore, vol. 0 =

Remix album by Boredoms
- Released: May 23, 2001
- Genre: Noise rock; experimental
- Length: 50:26
- Label: Warner Music Japan
- Producer: Yamantaka Eye

Boredoms chronology
Rebore, vol. 3 (2001)	Rebore, vol. 0 (2001)	Seadrum/House of Sun (2004)

Professional ratings
Review scores
Source	Rating
Pitchfork Media	8.4/10 link

Rebore, vol. 0: Vision Recreation by Eye is a 2001 album by experimental noise rock band Boredoms. It is the final in the series of four remix albums of Boredoms material and was compiled and mixed entirely by Eye.

== Track listing ==
1. "7" – 8:40
2. "77" – 6:31
3. "777" – 7:27
4. "7777" – 8:42
5. "77777" – 4:46
6. "777777" – 7:26
7. "7777777" – 6:54

(Note: The track entitled "7" on this release is different than the tracks titled "7" on Super Roots 6 and Super Roots 7.)
