= Humming Moon Drip =

Studio album by OLAibi
- Released: February 15, 2006
- Genre: Neo-psychedelia, experimental rock, freak folk
- Length: 52:16
- Label: Polystar Co., Ltd.

OLAibi chronology
Humming Moon Drip (2006)	Tingaruda (2009)

Humming Moon Drip is the first studio album by the electronic band Olaibi. It was released in 2006 on Polystar Co., Ltd..

== Track listing ==
1. Owl tree - (0:26)
2. tower - (2:42)
3. tuk tuk - (2:17)
4. 太陽 - (5:56)
5. ルーサンダ - (1:32)
6. ワハタン - (5:02)
7. NGOMA - (1:49)
8. Humming moon - (14:20)
9. taw bi da fay weuy - (9:32)
10. imbawimbo - (1:24)
11. ioenami - (7:16)

== Personnel ==
- OLAibi
- Yoshimi P-We
- Ai
