= Kila Kila Kila =

Studio album by OOIOO
- Released: 7 July 2003
- Recorded: October – November 2002
- Genre: Experimental rock
- Length: 62:56
- Labels: Ape Sound, Thrill Jockey
- Producer: Yoshimi P-we

OOIOO chronology
Gold and Green (2002)	Kila Kila Kila (2003)	Taiga (2006)

Kila Kila Kila is the fourth studio album from the Japanese rock band OOIOO, originally released in 2003 in Japan. It was later released in America on February 17, 2004, the band's first album released on Thrill Jockey.

== Critical reception ==
Professional ratings
Aggregate scores
Source	Rating
Metacritic	75/100
Review scores
Source	Rating
AllMusic	3.5/5 stars
BBC	(Favorable)
Dusted	(Favorable)
Logo Magazine	3.5/5 stars
Neumu	(5/10)
Pitchfork	(5.8/10)
Stylus	(C)

Kila Kila Kila was met with "generally favorable" reviews from critics. At Metacritic, which assigns a weighted average rating out of 100 to reviews from mainstream publications, this release received an average score of 75, based on 10 reviews.

== Track listing ==
All lyrics are written by Yoshimi P-We; all music is composed by OOIOO.

No.	Title	Length
1.	"Kila Kila Kila"	1:26
2.	"Ene Soda"	4:54
3.	"Sizuku Ring Neng"	10:39
4.	"On Mani"	7:19
5.	"Northern Light"	9:47
6.	"Niko Niko Niko"	2:01
7.	"Aster"	15:11
8.	"Anuenue Au"	11:39

== Personnel ==
- Yoshimi - Vocals, Electric Guitar
  - Organ on "Kila Kila Kila" and "Niko Niko Niko"
  - Fender Rhodes on "Sizuku Ring Neng"
  - Trumpet on "On Mani"
  - Kaoss Pad Hamming on "Northern Lights"
  - Piano on "Anuenue"
  - Percussion on "Ene Soda", "Sizuku Ring Neng" and "Northern Light"
- Kayan - Electric Guitar, Backing Vocals
- Aya - Bass, Backing Vocals
- Yuka Yoshimura - Drums, Backing Vocals (of Catsuomaticdeath, Metalchicks, ex. DMBQ, ex. OOIOO, ex. Hydro-Guru)

=== Guest performers ===
- Tatekawa Yo2ro - Drums, Cowbell on "Northern Lights"
- Sun Tour - Sampler on "Nico Nico Nico"
- Hatano Atuko - Cello on "On Mani" and "Aster", Violin on "On Mani"
- Moriya Takumin - Double Bass on "Kila Kila Kila", "On Mani" and "Aster"

=== Technical personnel ===
- Yoshimi - Production, Mixing
- Hara Koichi - Mixing, Engineering
- Koizumi - Mastering
- Goto Shoji - Artwork
- Tominaga Yoshie - Photography

== Releases information ==
Region	Date	Label	Format	Catalog
Japan	July 7, 2003	Ape Sounds	CD	ASVL-005
United States	February 17, 2004	Thrill Jockey	CD	117
