= Super Roots 2 =

EP by Boredoms
- Released: July 25, 1994
- Genre: Noise rock
- Length: 6:30
- Label: Warner Music Japan
- Producer: Boredoms

Boredoms chronology
Onanie Bomb Meets the Sex Pistols (1994)	Super Roots 2 (1994)	Chocolate Synthesizer (1994)

Super Roots 2 is the second installment of the Super Roots EP series by Japanese experimental band Boredoms. Released as a 3" CD, it was mailed to people in Japan who completed and sent a survey card enclosed with the Japanese release of Chocolate Synthesizer. Because of its short duration, it was the only Super Roots not to be rereleased by Vice Records in 2007.

== Reception ==
Professional ratings
Review scores
Source	Rating
The Virgin Encyclopedia of Nineties Music	2/5 stars

Deborah Sprague of Trouser Press stated that the album "will keep you on the edge of your seat, if only for the numerous long silences that cleave songs like 'Magic Milk' and 'White Plastic See-Through Finger'."

== Track listing ==
1. "Sexy Boredoms" – 0:55
2. "Go Come Uparks" – 1:18
3. "Magic Milk" – 1:43
4. "White Plastic See-Thru Finger" – 2:02
5. "Boxodous (Noise Ramones Mix)" – 0:32
