= 77 Boa Drum =

Live album by Boredoms
- Released: November 26, 2008
- Recorded: July 7, 2007 at Empire–Fulton Ferry section of Brooklyn Bridge Park in Brooklyn, New York
- Genre: Psychedelic rock; experimental
- Length: 100:11
- Label: Commmons

Boredoms chronology
Voaltz / Relerer (2008)	77 Boa Drum (2008)	Super Roots 10 (2009)

77 Boa Drum is a live album by Japanese experimental music group Boredoms, recorded on July 7, 2007, at the Empire–Fulton Ferry section of Brooklyn Bridge Park in Brooklyn, New York. It was released on two CDs, plus a 20-minute all-region NTSC DVD documenting the performance, mounted in a large hardcover book with photos and full credits. In Japan the package sells for 7,777 yen (including sales tax), about US$70.

The concert, produced by Vice and local promoter JellyNYC, featured the core Boredoms lineup of Yamataka Eye on electronics, vocals and Sevena (a custom-made instrument that, at the performance, was a vertically mounted array of seven electric lap steel guitars played with sticks); Yoshimi P-We; Yojiro Tatekawa; and Muneomi Senju. The band was joined by 74 other drummers (for a total of 77, plus Eye as member 0). Notable participating drummers included Hisham Bharoocha, Andrew W.K., Robin Easton, Aaron Moore, Christopher Powell, David Nuss, Kid Millions, Ryan Sawyer, Tim DeWitt, and Brian Chippendale.

The band organized a series of two sequel concerts with JellyNYC, 88 Boadrum, on August 8, 2008. Both featured 88 drummers. One, in LA, was led by the Boredoms. The other, in NY, was led by the band Gang Gang Dance

== Track listing ==
The album consists of two CDs, each containing only one track.

1. "77 BOA DRUM PART.1 / SEVEN" – 53:32
2. "77 BOA DRUM PART.2 / SUN LOARD (sic)" – 46:39
