= Super Seeeeee!!!!!! =

Video by Boredoms
- Released: June 5, 1998
- Genre: Noise rock
- Length: 26:13
- Label: Warner Music Japan; Warner Music Vision

Boredoms chronology
Super æ (1998)	Super Seeeeee!!!!!! (1998)	Super 77/Super Sky (1998)

Super Seeeeee!!!!!! is a live video released by Japanese noise rock band Boredoms, and is their first official video. It was released in 1998 by Warner Music Japan on VHS, and reissued later in 2004 and 2006 on DVD.

== Track listing ==
1. "ETOT" – 13:54 (remix of "Super You" from Super æ, set to animation by Naohiro Ukawa; includes 3:50 remix of SMPTE color bars at the beginning)
2. "SUPER GO!!!!!→shine in◯shine on" – 11:26 (collage of live performances shot at Meiji University on November 23, 1996, and Vitamin Q & Scared Cave in Nagano on September 17, 1997, during the lunar eclipse)
