= Kashaka =

West African percussion instrument

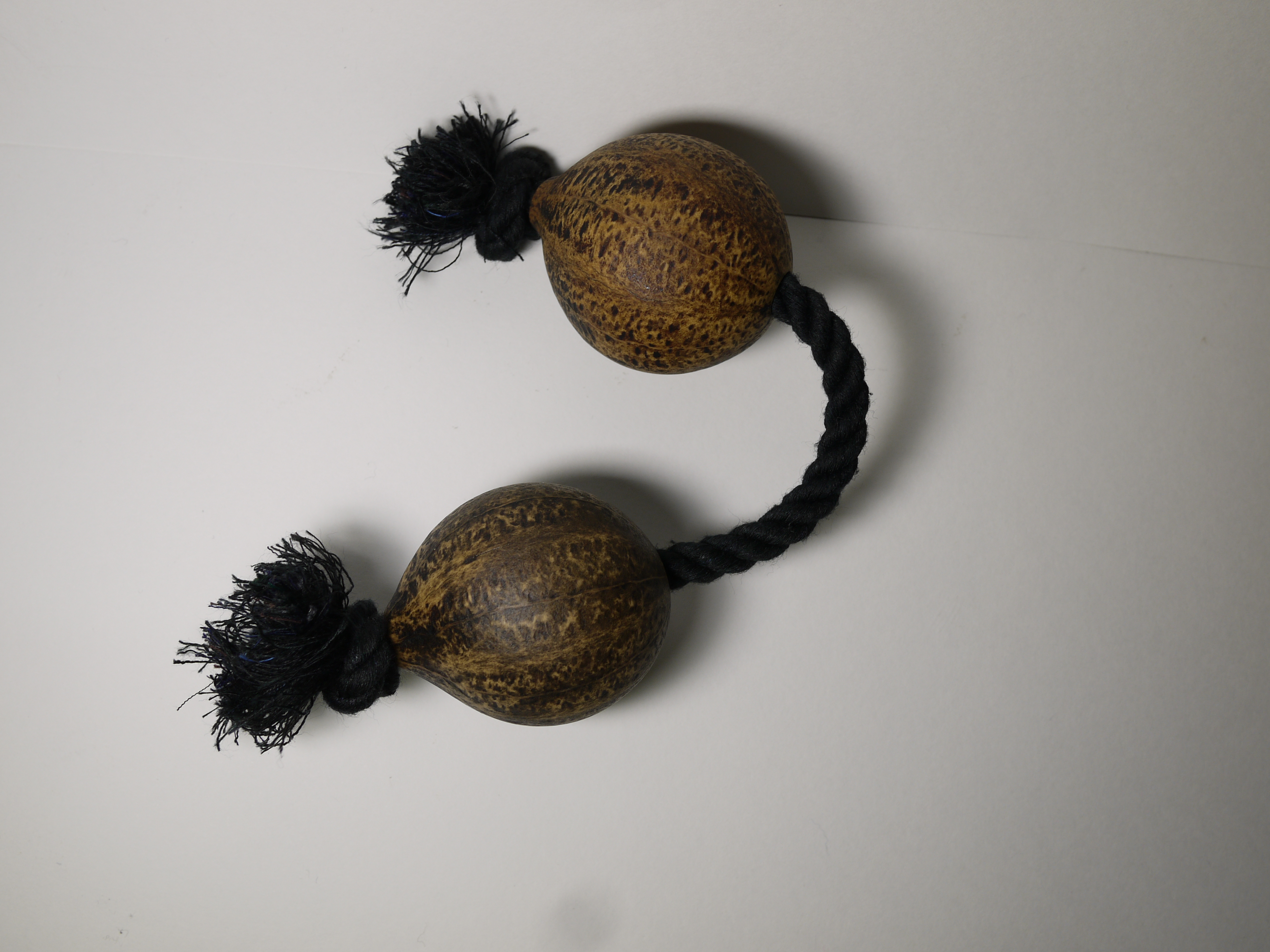
Kashaka

The kashaka is a simple percussion instrument consisting of two small gourds filled with beans (essentially, two small shakers connected by a string). One gourd is held in the hand and the other is quickly swung from side to side around the hand, creating a "clack" sound upon impact. It originated in West Africa, but has been reproduced in various countries under different names: Patica (Japan), Kosika (USA). Other names include Asalato, Kes Kes, Tchangot Tche, Koshkah, and many others.

Kashakas create both shaking sounds and percussive clicks by swinging the balls around the hand, making them hit each other. Learning to catch the Kashaka can be difficult at first but this enables a much larger variety of rhythms to be created. Also, as players' hands come in different sizes, it is important to play a Kashaka of the right size, as it makes learning how to play and master different rhythms much easier. When a Kashaka is played in each hand by an experienced player, polymeters can be produced by playing two different rhythms with different time signatures.

== Manufacturing methods ==
Each ball of a Kashaka (also known as the aslatua) is a hollow gourd from the Oncoba spinosa tree. Traditionally, when the gourds dry and fall from the trees, children collect them and fill them with orange pebbles from the iron-rich soil of the Sahel. Along the coast of West Africa, small pieces of shells are used instead.

The two gourd balls are attached to each other by a small string (sometimes made from old rags braided together), in one of two ways:

- One way is to make a single, round hole in the bottom of the Kashaka. Once the shaker material has been added, one end of the string is knotted and inserted in the hole. Then a small stick, which has been tapered at one end by a knife, is inserted into the hole until it can go no further. The stick is glued to the thin wall of the gourd, and once it has dried, the end of the stick protruding from the gourd is carefully sawed off. The length of string between the balls can vary from 6–12 cm, depending on the size of the ball (the larger the ball, the longer the string).
- Another way to make Kashakas is to make a hole on both the top and bottom of each gourd and once the shaker material has been added, the rope is threaded through both holes of each gourd and knotted on the outside of the gourds. Kashakas made in this way are adjustable, as the knot can be moved up or down the string. This can be advantageous, as it is much easier to learn how to play and master Kashakas when they are the correct size for a player's hand.
