= Voaltz / Rereler =

Remix album by Boredoms
- Released: August 30, 2008
- Genre: Noise rock
- Label: Rhythm Republic

Boredoms chronology
Live at Sunflancisco (2007)	Voaltz / Rereler (2008)	77 Boadrum (2008)

Voaltz / Rereler is a limited-edition remix single by Boredoms, released on August 30, 2008, on 12″ vinyl. The single contains remixes of both songs from the bonus CD that came with the Live at Sunflancisco DVD.

== Track listing ==
1. "Voaltz (U-Bus Remix by Altz / Kabamix)"
2. "Rereler (Di Coswamp mix)"
