= Super Roots =

EP by Boredoms
- Released: September 25, 1993
- Genre: Noise rock
- Length: 19:19
- Label: WEA Japan (Japan) Reprise/Warner Bros. Records (United States); 41559 Very Friendly (United Kingdom); Vice/Atlantic Records (United States) (rerelease)
- Producer: Boredoms

Boredoms chronology
Pop Tatari (1992)	Super Roots (1993)	Wow 2 (1993)

Super Roots is the first installment of the Super Roots EP series by Japanese experimental band Boredoms, released in 1993 by WEA Japan, in 1994 by Reprise/Warner Bros. Records in the United States, and rereleased in 2007 by Very Friendly Records in the United Kingdom and Vice/Atlantic Records in the United States.

== Reception ==
Professional ratings
Review scores
Source	Rating
AllMusic	3.5/5 stars
Pitchfork	(7.6/10)
The New Rolling Stone Album Guide	3/5 stars

In a review for AllMusic, Thom Jurek described the music as "joyous insanity," and stated that the tracks "are fun; they're wild; they're virtually unlike anything else out there."

Pitchfork's Dominique Leone wrote: "much of the record takes on a tribal ambience with pitter-patter percussion and the feeling that all of this is happening amongst island natives cooped up in a studio on their one foray into the city."

Deborah Sprague of Trouser Press called the album "the most overtly playful" release of the Super Roots series, and noted that "skittery schoolyard giggles like 'Ear? Wig? Web?' and 'Budokan Tape Try (500 Tapes High)'" set "a giddy mood."

Writing for Frieze, Mark Fisher described the album as "a compendium of yelps, chants, wah-wah trumpet and acid guitar," and "an absurdist Rock miscellany, a series of fragments and offcuts."

A writer for Freq stated: "The inane collides head on with the insane... This album sounds like the end product of demented nihilist dada antimusic that has collapsed into entropy."

== Track listing ==
original WEA Japan CD release (1993)

1. "Pop Kiss" – 0:54
2. "Budôkan Tape Try (500 Tapes High)" – 1:41
3. "Finger Action No. 5" – 0:42
4. "Chocolate Out" – 2:09
5. "Pitch at Bunch on Itch" – 0:44
6. "Machine 3" – 1:04
7. "Monster Rex & Sound'a'Roundus" – 2:50
8. "Nuts Room" – 1:28
9. "Ear? Wig? Web?" – 1:51
10. "96 Teenage Bondage" – 2:31
11. "Super Frake 009" – 2:32
12. "Used CD" – 0:53

Reprise/Warner Bros. Records CD rerelease (1994)

1. "Pop Kiss" – 0:54
2. "Budôkan Tape Try (500 Tapes High)" – 1:41
3. "Finger Action No. 5" – 0:42
4. "Chocolate Out" – 2:09

Very Friendly and Vice/Atlantic Records CD rereleases (2007)

1. "Pop Kiss" – 0:54
2. "Budôkan Tape Try (500 Tapes High)" – 1:41
3. "Finger Action No. 5" – 0:42
4. "Chocolate Out" – 2:09
5. "Pitch at Bunch on Itch" – 0:44
6. "Machine 3" – 1:04
7. "Monster Rex & Sound'a'Roundus" – 2:50
8. "Nuts Room" – 1:28
9. "Ear? Wig? Web?" – 1:51
10. "96 Teenage Bondage" – 2:05
11. "Kou" – 0:26
12. "Super Frake 009" – 0:59
13. "Otsu" – 1:32
14. "Used CD" – 0:53
