= Super Roots 3 =

EP by Boredoms
- Released: November 30, 1994
- Genre: Noise rock
- Length: 33:32
- Label: Warner Music Japan
- Producer: Boredoms

Boredoms chronology
Chocolate Synthesizer (1994)	Super Roots 3 (1994)	Super Roots 5 (1995)

Super Roots 3 is the third installment of the Super Roots EP series by Japanese experimental band Boredoms. It consists of one song, half an hour in length, which has a repetitive rhythm throughout. It was released in 1994 by Warner Music Japan, and was reissued in 2007 by Vice Music and the Very Friendly label.

== Reception ==
Professional ratings
Review scores
Source	Rating
AllMusic	3.5/5 stars
Pitchfork	6.9/10
The New Rolling Stone Album Guide	1.5/5 stars
The Virgin Encyclopedia of Nineties Music	2/5 stars

In a review for AllMusic, Thom Jurek called the music "one solid blast-ass cut," and wrote: "This is the Boredoms at their most monotonous, but then again, the riff progression has teeth and great drums, and its subtle change is hypnotic in a brutal but no less hedonistic manner."

Pitchfork's Dominique Leone described the album as "a straightforward fusion of hardcore punk and purity through repetition," and commented: "Perhaps Eye got the idea from his heroes Bad Brains, who while never playing any 30-minute hardcore jams, did suggest the possibility that cosmic enlightenment and violent pummeling via riffs and beats were by no means mutually exclusive."

Mark Fisher of Frieze noted that, on the album, the goal was to "combine Acid Rock's expansive wig-outs with Punk's cropped economy." He remarked: "'Hard Trance Away...' produces psychedelic effects with the barest of means... The locked groove repetition soon attains a kind of agitated stillness, a thrashing stasis."

A writer for Freq stated: "33 minutes of monolithic manic pulverising powerful riffs. A full on headlong assault. This is essential stuff."

== Track listing ==
1. "Hard Trance Away (Karaoke of Cosmos)" – 33:32
