= Mungolian Jet Set =

Norwegian electronic music duo

Logo

Mungolian Jet Set is a Norwegian electronic music duo consisting of DJ and turntablist Pål "Strangefruit" Nyhus and producer Knut Sævik.

The band's second studio album, We Gave It All Away, Now We Are Taking It Back, received a 8.1 rating from Pitchfork.

== Discography ==
- Beauty Came to Us in Stone (2006)
- We Gave It All Away... Now We Are Taking It Back (2009)
- Schlungs (2011)
- Mungodelics (2012)
