= Rebore, vol. 1 =

- CD release

Remix album by Boredoms
- Released: September 27, 2000
- Genre: Trance
- Length: 45:58
- Label: Warner Music Japan
- Producer: Unkle

Boredoms chronology
Vision Creation Newsun (2000)	Rebore, vol. 1 (2000)	Rebore, vol. 2 (2000)

Alternative cover
- Vinyl LP release

Rebore, vol. 1 is a 2000 album by experimental noise rock band Boredoms. It is the first of three in the Rebore series, and is a DJ remix by Unkle that contains samples from Boredoms' entire discography to that point.

== Track listing ==
1. "Dysfunctional Monster Jam" – 46:01

== Personnel ==
- James Lavelle – compilation, mixing
- Mitsukazu Tanaka – mastering
- The Nextmen – scratching
- Naohiro Ukawa and Anthony Ausgang – cover art
- Masanobu Kondo – executive producer
- Richard File – programming, compilation, mixing
