= Rebore, vol. 2 =

- CD release

Remix album by Boredoms
- Released: November 22, 2000
- Genre: Experimental; techno
- Length: 50:21
- Label: WEP Japan
- Producer: Ken Ishii

Boredoms chronology
Rebore, vol. 1 (2000)	Rebore, vol. 2 (2000)	Rebore, vol. 3 (2001)

Alternative cover
- Vinyl LP release

Professional ratings
Review scores
Source	Rating
Allmusic	link

Rebore, vol. 2 is an album by the experimental noise rock band Boredoms. It is the second of four in the Rebore series, and is a DJ remix by Ken Ishii that contains samples from Boredoms' entire discography to that point.

== Track listing ==
1. "Unidentified Freaked-Up Outsteppers (Non-Stop Ki Mix)" – 50:21
