= Super Roots 9 =

EP by Boredoms
- Released: February 26, 2007
- Recorded: December 24, 2004 at Laforet Museum in Roppongi, Tokyo
- Genre: Psychedelic rock; experimental rock; krautrock
- Length: 40:28
- Label: commmons (JP); Thrill Jockey (US)
- Producer: Boredoms

Boredoms chronology
Seadrum/House of Sun (2004)	Super Roots 9 (2007)	Live at Sunflancisco (2007)

Professional ratings
Review scores
Source	Rating
Allmusic	2.5/5 stars
Pitchfork Media	(6.9/10)
Stylus Magazine	(C+)
Tiny Mix Tapes	4/5 stars

Super Roots 9 is the eighth installment of Super Roots EPs by Japanese experimental band Boredoms (now known as V∞redoms). This album continues with the previous trends of Boredoms' drum-oriented tribal drone music. It documents a Christmas 2004 show with a 24-member choral ensemble.

== Track listing ==
1. "Livwe!!" – 40:28
