= Rebore, vol. 3 =

- CD release

Remix album by Boredoms
- Released: February 21, 2001
- Genre: Experimental; techno
- Length: 44:51
- Label: Warner Music Japan
- Producer: DJ Krush

Boredoms chronology
Rebore, vol. 2 (2000)	Rebore, vol. 3 (2001)	Rebore, vol. 0 (2001)

Alternative cover
- Vinyl LP release

Rebore, vol. 3 is the third remix album of material by experimental noise rock band Boredoms. It is the third of four in the Rebore series, and is a DJ remix by DJ Krush that contains samples from Boredoms' entire discography to that point.

== Track listing ==
1. "DJ Krush Gigamix" – 44:51

== Personnel ==
- DJ Krush – production, compilation, mixing
- Toshihiko Miyoshi – engineering, mixing
- Mitsukazu Tanaka – mastering
- Anthony Ausgang – artwork
- Masanobu Kondo – executive production
- Noriko Asano – production coordination
