= Super Roots 5 =

EP by Boredoms
- Released: December 21, 1995
- Genre: Noise rock; drone
- Length: 64:19
- Label: Warner Music Japan

Boredoms chronology
Super Roots 3 (1994)	Super Roots 5 (1995)	Super Roots 6 (1996)

Professional ratings
Review scores
Source	Rating
AllMusic	4/5 stars
Pitchfork Media	(7.0/10)

Super Roots 5 is the fourth installment in the Super Roots EP series by noise rock band Boredoms, released in 1995 by Warner Music Japan.

There was never a Super Roots 4 released due to some sort of conflict with a record label (rather than the popularly cited superstition about the number in Japanese culture).

== Track listing ==
No.	Title	Length
1.	"GO!!!!!"	64:19
