= OOIOO =

Japanese experimental rock band

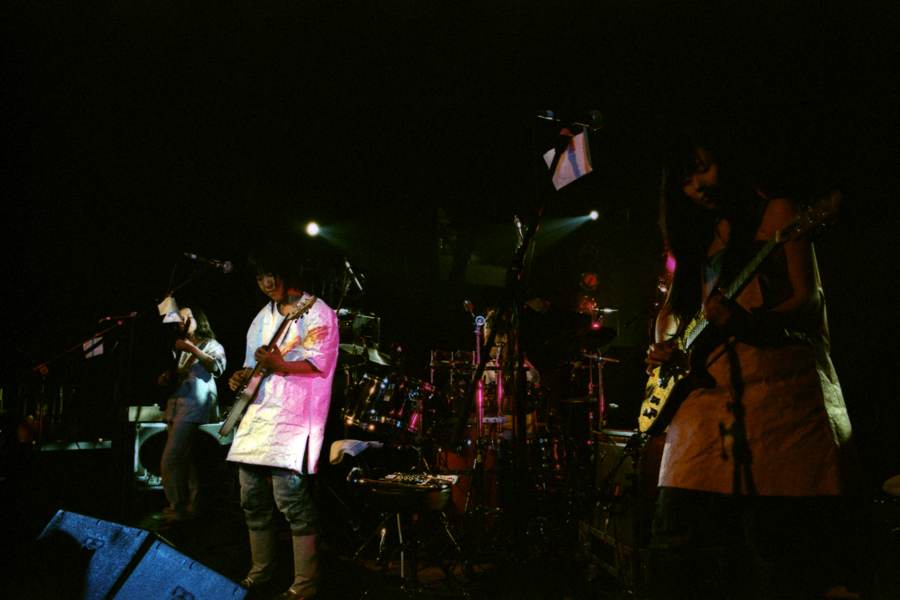
- OOIOO performing at All Tomorrow's Parties, 2004

Background information
- Origin: Japan
- Genres: Experimental rock; neo-psychedelia
- Years active: 1996–present
- Labels: Trattoria Records, Thrill Jockey
- Members: YOSHIMIO; KayaN; AyA; MISHINA
- Past members: Kyoko; Maki; Yoshiko
- Website: ooioo.jp

OOIOO is a Japanese experimental rock band. The four-piece ensemble was founded by Yoshimi P-We (also known as Yoshimio), the drummer and occasional trumpeter for Boredoms. The band's origin lies in a photo shoot that Yoshimi was asked to do for a magazine. She invited a few of her friends to join her, and they created a fake band for the shoot, which they later decided to make real. The band quickly gained attention by being the opening act for Sonic Youth in 1997 on their Japan tour.

According to AllMusic's Kieran McCarthy "It's next to impossible to describe their sound, because — by design — it rarely follows consistent patterns". Some of their music has been described as having "a majestic ebb and flow that suggests natural wonders" or a "witchy, tribal side". Either way, at any one time it may incorporate chanting and punchy drums, dancey polyrhythms atonal composition or psychedelia.

== Discography ==
=== Albums ===
- OOIOO (1997)
- Feather Float (1999)
- Gold and Green (2000)
- Kila Kila Kila (2003)
- Taiga (2006)
- Armonico Hewa (2009)
- Gamel (2013)
- Nijimusi (2019)

=== EPs ===
- OOEYヨOO -EYヨ REMIX (Eye Remix EP) (2007)

=== Collaborative albums ===
- The Horizon Spirals / The Horizon Viral (with Lightning Bolt) (2026)

=== Compilations ===
- Shock City Shockers 2 (2001)
  - compilation of remixes including mixes by Yamantaka Eye, Kan Takagi, Nobukazu Takemura, and Kiyoshi Izumi; also includes "Open Your Eyes, You Can Fly", a cover of the Chick Corea/Flora Purim jazz fusion song
- COCOCOOOIOO: The Best of Shock City 1997–2001 (2004)
  - highlights from their first three albums, with a remixed track from the Shock City Shockers 2 compilation

== Personnel ==
=== Current members ===
- YOSHIMIO — vocals, guitar
- KayaN — guitars, vocals, keyboards
- AyA — bass
- MISHINA — drums

=== Former members ===
- Ai — drums
- Kyoko — vocals, guitar (died July 19, 2015)
- Maki — bass, keyboards
- Yoshico — drums (Her real name is Yuka Yoshimura. She is currently a member of CATSUOMATICDEATH, METALCHICKS, and a former member of DMBQ)

=== Guest musicians ===
- Sean Lennon
- Seiichi Yamamoto
- Yuka Honda
- Yamantaka Eye
- Julia Cafritz
