= Vision Creation Newsun =

Studio album by Boredoms
- Released: December 10, 1999
- Genres: Psychedelic rock; space rock; krautrock; neo-psychedelia; post-rock
- Length: 67:41
- Labels: Birdman, WEA Japan

Boredoms chronology
Vision Creation Newsun (EP) (1999)	Vision Creation Newsun (1999)	Rebore, vol. 1 (2001)

Box set cover
- Cover for the box set version of Vision Creation Newsun.

Vision Creation Newsun is an album by Japanese rock band Boredoms released by WEA Japan. The standard one-disc edition was released in Japan on December 10, 1999, and in the United States the following year by Birdman Records.

== Music and composition ==
Described as a space rock and krautrock album, Vision Creation Newsun marks the band moving away from their noise-influenced sound. According to AllMusic's Mark Richardson, the album sees Boredoms "settling into a loose, jam-oriented aesthetic." Richardson further added: "The first two tracks find Boredoms further investigating pounding tribal rock with propulsive drumming, energetic guitar work, and vocal chants. The overall feel bears some similarity to Super æ, with tracks that draw from Krautrock and psychedelia, but Vision Creation Newsun adds a folk element, including softer instrumental textures like hand percussion, lengthy cymbal washes, and acoustic guitars. Some passages even flirt with new age, as they weave bird songs and the sound of falling water into the mix."

== Critical reception ==
Professional ratings
Review scores
Source	Rating
AllMusic	3/5 stars
Metal Hammer	7/10
NME	9/10
Pitchfork	7.9/10
The Rolling Stone Album Guide	4/5 stars
Spin	8/10

Vision Creation Newsun generally received positive reviews from music critics. Writing for AllMusic, Mark Richardson said: "This is not the left-field triumph that Super æ was, but it's a strong album nonetheless."

Pitchfork ranked Vision Creation Newsun at number 39 on its list of the 200 best albums of the 2000s.

== Track listing ==
With the exception of track #9, each song's title is represented officially by a symbol. When referring to these tracks in print and in MP3 tags, the alternate names (including parentheses) are often used.

No.	Title	Length
1.	"◯" (circle)	13:42
2.	"☆" (star)	5:22
3.	"♡" (heart)	6:51
4.	"Ҩ" (spiral)	6:33
5.	"～" (tilde)	6:19
6.	"◎" (two circles)	7:21
7.	"↑" (arrow up)	6:26
8.	"Ω" (omega)	7:36
9.	"ずっと" ("Zutto" ["Forever"])	7:31

=== Limited edition ===
The album was originally released with alternative artwork, a second disc, a T-shirt, a sticker, and an electronic device that played sampled frog noises when the box was opened. The second disc contains a 30+ minute live track consisting of an unreleased song and the opening track from the studio disc. The track is bookended by two short edits of tracks from the studio disc.

Disc 2 track list
No.	Title	Length
1.	"⊙" (circle with dot) (remix of "☆")	1:28
2.	"" (hourglass/Boretronix logo) (Live Nov '98 [Osaka City Univ. Outdoor Free Concert])	35:38
3.	"◌" (dotted circle) (remix of "♡")	5:33

== Personnel ==
- Yamatsuka Eye — vocals, samples, turntables, open reel, vocoder, computer, electronics, editing
- Seiichi Yamamoto — guitars, vocals
- Hira Yoshinari — bass, vocals, effects
- Yokota Yoshimi — drums, vocals, percussion, Casiotone keyboards
- Kazuya Nihshimura — drums, vocals, percussion, electronic pads
- Iida Kazuhisa — drums, vocals, percussion, electronic pads
