= Anal by Anal =

EP by Boredoms
- Released: August 1986
- Genre: Noise rock; experimental rock
- Length: 9:08
- Label: Trans; SSE Communications
- Producer: Boredoms

Boredoms chronology
Anal by Anal (1986)	Osorezan no Stooges Kyo (1988)

Anal by Anal is the first release by Japanese noise rock band Boredoms. It was released in 1986 by Japanese label Trans Records and again in 1993 by SSE Communications.

== Track listing ==
1. "Anal Eater" – 3:17
2. "God from Anal" – 3:09
3. "Born to Anal" – 2:42
