= Super Roots 10 =

Super Roots 10 / Ant 10

EP by Boredoms
- Released: January 28, 2009
- Label: Commmons, Thrill Jockey
- Producer: Boredoms

Boredoms chronology
77 Boadrum (2008)	Super Roots 10 / Ant 10 (2009)

Professional ratings
Review scores
Source	Rating
Drowned in Sound	8/10 link
In Review Online	link
Jrawk	link
Pitchfork Media	7.6/10 link

Super Roots 10 / Ant 10 is the ninth installment of the Super Roots series of releases by Japanese experimental band Boredoms. The CD of the full version was released in Japan on January 28, 2009. On August 5, 2009, two 12" singles were released from this in Japan: Ant 10 Vol. 1 (tracks 3 and 5 as sides A and B, respectively) and Ant 10 Vol. 2 (tracks 2 and 6). The American releases on Thrill Jockey were a double 12" single (tracks 2, 3, 5 and 6, in that order) with enclosed 24" x 24" poster, which is now out of print, and MP3 downloads.

== Track listing ==
1. "Super Rooy" – 0:38
2. "Ant 10" – 9:28
3. "Ant 10/Estereo 10 (Remix by ALTZ)" – 9:34
4. "Ant 10 (Remix by DJ Finger Hat)" – 5:24
5. "Ant 10 (Remix by DJ Lindstrøm)" – 10:45
6. "Ant 10/Mineral Dub Break (Remix by ALTZ)" – 10:21
