= Yamantaka Eye =

Japanese singer (born 1964)

Yamataka Eye
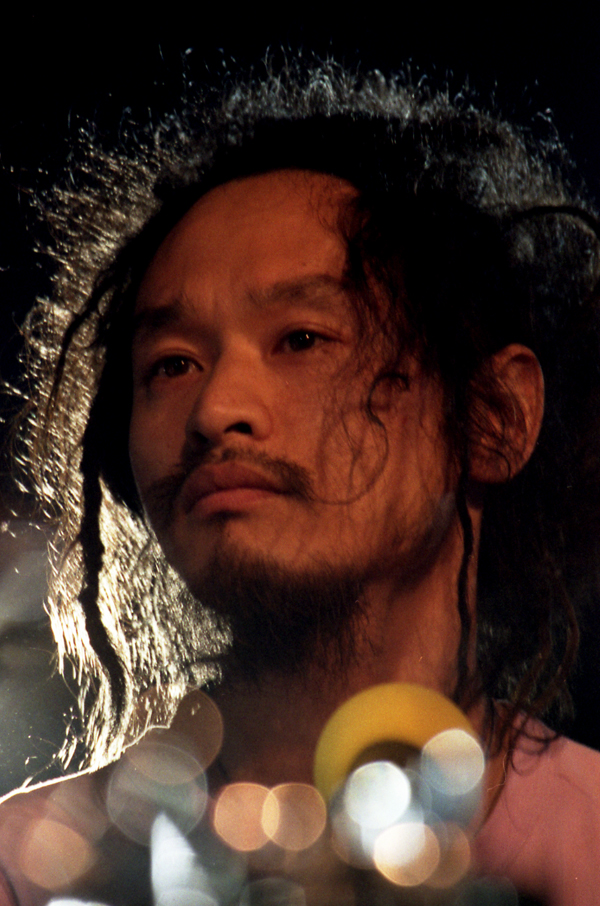
- Eye in 2004

Background information
- Born: Tetsurō Yamatsuka; 13 February 1964 (age 62)
- Origin: Kobe, Japan
- Genres: Experimental rock, noise, electronic, danger music
- Years active: 1982–present
- Member of: Boredoms
- Formerly of: Hanatarash, Naked City, UFO or Die, Puzzle Punks, Noise Ramones, Destroy 2

Yamataka Eye (山塚アイ, Yamataka Ai) (born Tetsurō Yamatsuka (山塚徹郎, Yamatsuka Tetsurō), 13 February 1964) is a Japanese vocalist and visual artist, best known as a member of Boredoms, Hanatarash and Naked City. He has changed his stage name three times, from Yamatsuka Eye, to Yamantaka Eye, to Yamataka Eye, and sometimes calls himself eYe or EYヨ. He also DJs under the name DJ 光光光 or "DJ pica pica pica" ("pica" means "bright" or "shiny"), and has used numerous other pseudonyms.

== Music ==
=== Boredoms ===
Born in Kobe, Eye is a founder of the influential rock band, Boredoms, whose first major label release came out in the early '90s. They were signed to Warner Bros. (Chocolate Synthesizer era) by David Katznelson, then A&R VP of Warner Bros. The closest thing Boredoms have to a frontman, Eye offers a variety of vocal techniques: gurgles, screams, grunts and occasionally, relatively conventional singing. In the later days of Boredoms and in today's V∞redoms he plays electronics and open reel tapes.

=== Other ===
Yamantaka Eye is also a member of the bands Hanatarash, UFO or Die, Puzzle Punks, Noise Ramones and Destroy 2. He is notorious for his vast, confusing discography and countless guest appearances. In 1993, he recorded an EP with Sonic Youth called TV Shit for Thurston Moore's label, Ecstatic Peace. He also collaborated with Yamamoto Seiichi & Yamazaki Maso in the project "(Triple) Yama's" which was titled for their shared namesake. He released two albums, Live! and Live!!, with Japanese turntablist/improviser Otomo Yoshihide, under the moniker "MC Hellshit & DJ Carhouse". He formed a music and art group called Puzzle Punks, with Shinro Ohtake.

Other notable collaborations include his work with Bill Laswell's Praxis and with John Zorn's groups Naked City and Painkiller. Eye and Zorn also recorded the album Zohar as the "Mystic Fugu Orchestra." This latter compilation, which both commemorates and satirizes Jewish culture, also draws strength from Eye's earlier influence from the Oomoto religion in Japan, a sect claiming to possess visions of an emerging world order. Several generations of Eye's family belonged to Oomoto, which was at times brutally suppressed by the Japanese government. Yamantaka participated in the Boredoms 77 Boadrum performance which occurred on July 7, 2007 at 7:07 PM at the Empire-Fulton Ferry State Park in Brooklyn, New York, and the 88 Boadrum performance which occurred on August 8, 2008 at 8:08 PM at the La Brea Tar Pits in Los Angeles, California.

== Art ==
As well as his music, Eye is famous for his mixed-media style of art that utilises airbrush, marker pen and collage, amongst other materials. This work has adorned a number of records, including the majority of Boredoms releases. Similar to the Boredoms' musical direction, Eye started incorporating a much more psychedelic, calmer approach into his work, evident on the covers of many of the later Boredoms albums. Drawing as much from Japanese mythology as it does from his musical influence, such as early punk imagery, his work aims to complement the music as well as to provide another dimension to the sound. Eye also drew a comic strip in 1991, titled Frogleg Burning-X Comix Death.

Eye worked on the covers of the Beck records "Sexx Laws", Midnite Vultures, and Stray Blues - A Collection of B-Sides.

When discussing Eye's unique art style, Stylus Magazine writer Mike Powell commented:

It's worth talking about Eye's art not simply because, like Paul McCartney, he makes it, but because it's an extension of the same creative brain that propels the Boredoms.

Eye has presented his work at MoMA/PS1 in New York, in the Music is a Better Noise, and the Volume: Bed of Sound exhibitions.

== Discography ==
=== Audio Sports ===
- 3-6-9 (Bron Records) (EP) (1991)
- Eat+Buy+Eat (All Access) (EP/CD) (1992)
- Era of Glittering Gas (All Access) (CD) (1992)

=== Boredoms ===
- Osorezan no Stooges Kyo (1988)
- Soul Discharge (1989)
- Pop Tatari (1992)
- Chocolate Synthesizer (1994)
- Super æ (1998)
- Vision Creation Newsun (1999)
- Seadrum/House of Sun (2005)

=== Destroy 2 ===
- We Are Voice and Rhythm Only (1996)

=== DJ Chaos X ===
- Live Mixxx (2006)

=== DJ Pica Pica Pica ===
- Planetary Natural Love Gas Webbin' 199999 (1999)

=== Hanatarashi ===
- Hanazumari (1984)
- Take Back Your Penis!! (1984)
- Live Axtion 84.4.20 & 1.29 (1984)
- Noisexa (1984)
- Bombraining (1984)
- The Hit Parade 1 (1984)
- The Hit Parade 2 (1984)
- Hane Go Go (1984)
- Man Of Noise Noise Kyojin (1984)
- Live! 1984 3.24 (1984)
- 8448-412 (1984)
- Live Action 84.1.29 (1984)
- Live Act 16.Dec.1984 at Zabo Kyoto (1984)
- Merzbow & Hanatarashi (1985) (with Merzbow)
- Worst Selektion (1985)
- Worst Selektion (1985)
- Hanatarashi 1 (1985)
- Hanatarashi 2 (1987)

=== Hanatarash ===
- 3: William Bennet Has No Dick (1989)
- The Hanatarash and His Eye (1992)
- Live!! 1984 Dec. 16: Zabo-Kyoto (1993)
- Total Retardation (1995)
- 4: Aids-a-delic (1995)
- 5: We are 0:00 (1996)

=== The Lift Boys ===
- Anarchy Village b/w Anarchy Way (2005)
- Lift Boyz (2005)
- Tide Y Edit (2012)
- Jukey Lift (2014)

=== MC Hellshit & DJ Carhouse ===
- Live!
- Live!!

=== Puzzle Punks ===
- Pipeline - 24 Smash Hits by 24 Puzzle Punk Bands (1996)
- Budub (1996)
- Puzzoo (2006)

=== Tribal Circus ===
- Tribal Circus (2000) (with Hifana)

=== Yamataka Eye ===
- Re...Remix? (2008) (remix compilation)
- Sky Size Sea (2010)

=== Noise Ramones ===
- Rocket To DNA (1999)

=== with Battles ===
- Gloss Drop (2011)

=== with John Zorn ===
- Nani Nani (1995)
- Zohar (as Mystic Fugu Orchestra) (1995)
- Naninani II (2004)
- 50th Birthday Celebration Volume 10 (2005)

=== with Naked City ===
- Naked City (1989)
- Torture Garden (1990)
- Grand Guignol (1992)
- Heretic (1992)
- Leng Tch'e (1992)
- Radio (1993)

=== with Praxis ===
- Sacrifist (1994)

=== with Sonic Youth ===
- TV Shit (1994)

=== with Z-Rock Hawaii ===
- Z-Rock Hawaii (1996)

== See also ==
- Japanese art
- Dadaism
