= Super Roots 6 =

EP by Boredoms
- Released: January 25, 1996
- Genre: Experimental rock
- Length: 66:15
- Label: WEA Japan Reprise/Warner Bros. Records (United States); 46163

Boredoms chronology
Super Roots 5 (1995)	Super Roots 6 (1996)	Super Go!!!!! (1998)

Professional ratings
Review scores
Source	Rating
AllMusic	3.5/5 stars
Pitchfork Media	8.2/10

Super Roots 6 is the fifth installment in the Super Roots EP series by noise rock band Boredoms, released in 1996 by WEA Japan. In the United States, it was numbered and priced as a standard album.

== Track listing ==
1. "01" – 1:42
2. "0 (x12)" – 0:57
3. "6" – 6:08
4. "2" – 5:19
5. "3" – 5:44
6. "9" – 6:04
7. "4" – 1:20
8. "7" – 5:38
9. "8" – 4:05
10. "5" – 5:00
11. "10" – 6:06
12. "11" – 3:49
13. "12" – 3:30
14. "13" – 3:07
15. "14" – 3:29
16. "15" – 3:16
17. "1" – 1:01

(Note: The track titled "7" on this release is different than the track titled "7" on Rebore, vol. 0.)
