= YoshimiO =

Japanese musician

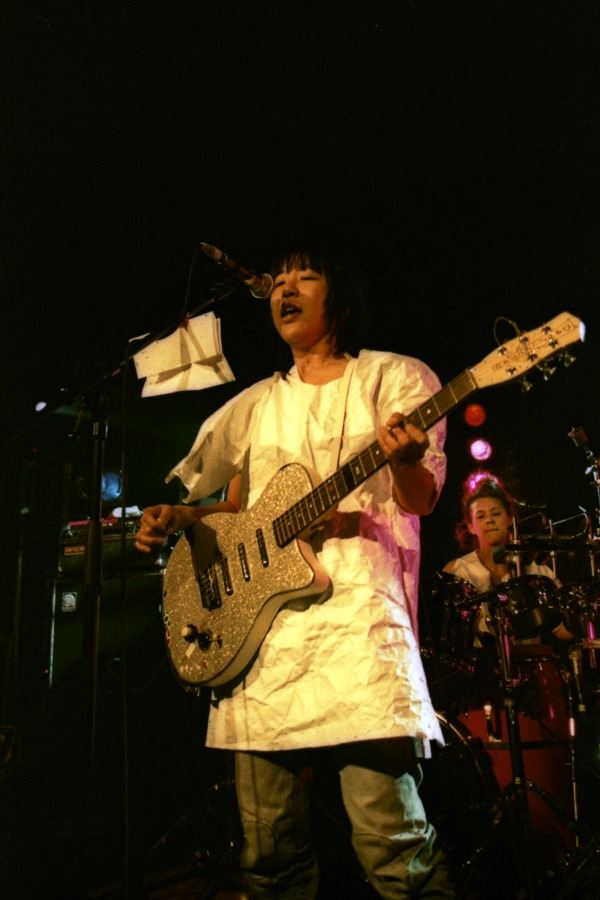
- Yoshimi performing in 2004

Background information
- Born: February 18, 1968 (age 58)
- Origin: Okayama, Japan
- Genres: Noise, electronica, alternative dance
- Member of: Boredoms; OOIOO; Free Kitten; Saicobab

Yoshimi (born Yokota Yoshimi (横田佳美); February 18, 1968) is a Japanese musician best known for her role as the longest consistent drummer in the Japanese rock band Boredoms.

Alongside her drum playing skills with Boredoms, she performs the vocals for the all female group OOIOO and also plays trumpet, guitar and keyboards.

Born in Okayama, Japan, Yoshimi joined her first band, U.F.O. or Die, with EYE in 1986. Since 1997, she has led the all-female band OOIOO and continues to contribute to the current incarnation of Boredoms.

Yoshimi has worked on many other projects, most notably a raga band called Saicobab, an ambient project called Yoshimi and Yuka, the tribal-drum-influenced OLAibi, and indie supergroup Free Kitten. She appeared as a session player and vocalist on the Flaming Lips' 2002 album Yoshimi Battles the Pink Robots, and joined the band in 2025 for two live shows in Tokyo, Japan. Yoshimi participated as drummer one in the Boredoms 77 Boadrum performance, which occurred on July 7, 2007, at the Empire-Fulton Ferry State Park in Brooklyn, New York.

== Reception ==
Yoshimi was featured on the cover of the July 2014 issue of WIRE magazine, and in a feature article by James Hadfield. Pitchfork covered her and her band OOIOO in a feature article in 2020. Modern Drummer magazine carried a feature article on Yoshimi written by John Colpitts. In 2016, Emi Kariya interviewed Yoshimi and Ikue Mori for Tom Tom Magazine.

Wayne Coyne of the Flaming Lips said that their album Yoshimi Battles The Pink Robots was inspired by Yoshimi.

== Discography ==
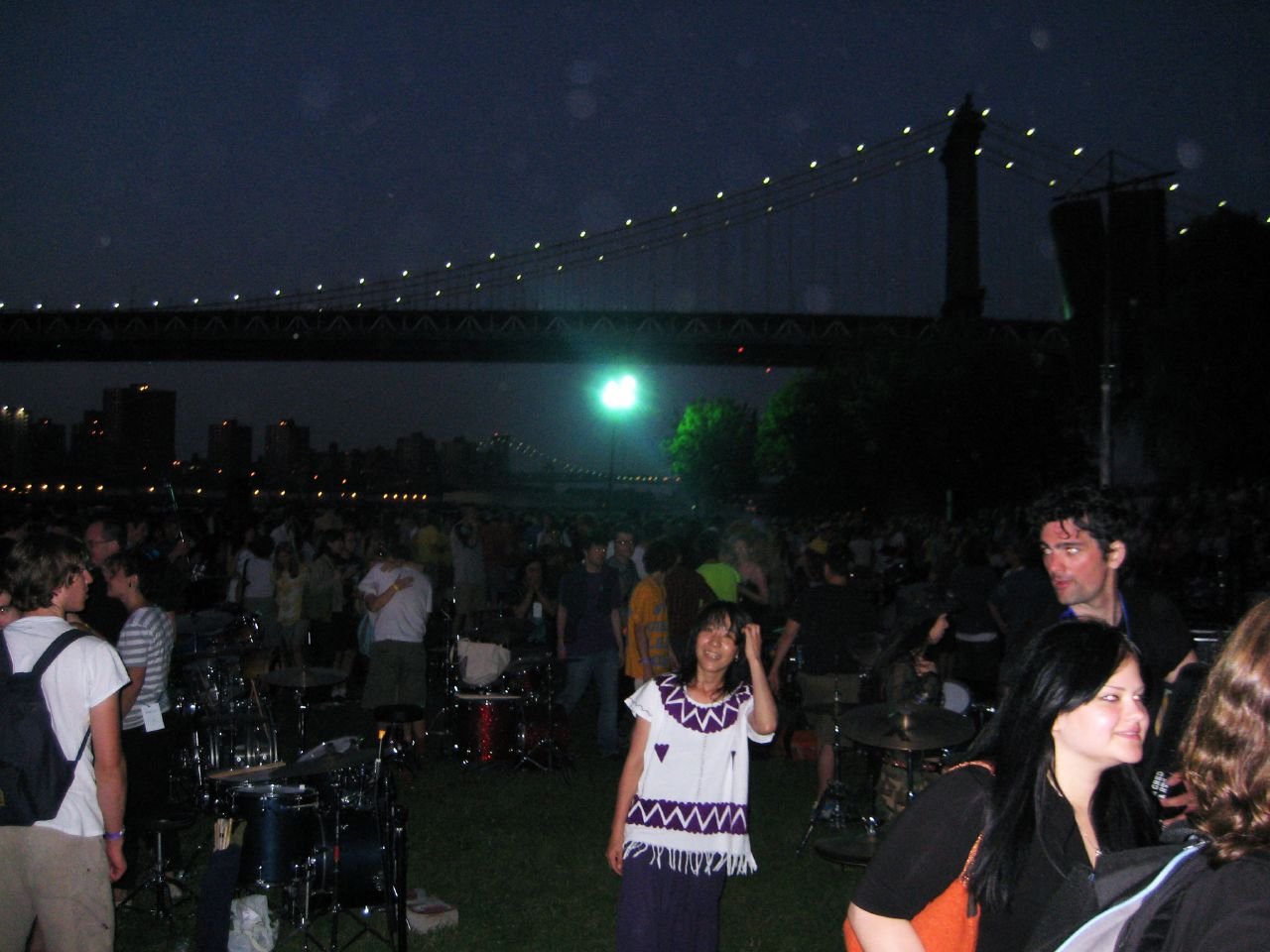
Yoshimi at 77 Boadrum, July 7, 2007

=== Yoshimio ===
- Big Toast (1993)
- 2 (1994)
- 3 (1995)
- Yunnan Colorfree (2007)
- Bor-Cozmik (2009)

=== Yoshimi and Yuka ===
- Flower with No Color (2003)

=== OOIOO ===
- OOIOO (1997)
- Feather Float (1999)
- Gold and Green (2000)
- Kila Kila Kila (2003)
- Taiga (2006)
- OOEYヨOO -EYヨ REMIX (Eye Remix EP) (2007)
- COCOCOOOIOO: The Best of Shock City 1997–2001
- Armonico Hewa (2009)
- Gamel (2013)
- Nijimusi (2019)

=== OLAibi ===
- Humming Moon Drip (2006)

=== Saicobab ===
- Sab Se Purani Bab (2017)

=== Z-Rock Hawaii ===
- Z-Rock Hawaii (1996)
