= Seadrum/House of Sun =

Studio album by Boredoms
- Released: September 23, 2004
- Genre: Psychedelic rock; space rock
- Length: 43:06
- Label: Warner Music Japan (JP); Vice (US)
- Producer: Boredoms

Boredoms chronology
Rebore, vol. 0 (2001)	Seadrum/House of Sun (2004)	Super Roots 9 (2007)

Professional ratings
Review scores
Source	Rating
AllMusic	4/5 stars
Billboard	(favorable)
Pitchfork Media	(6/10)
Stylus Magazine	(C)
Tiny Mix Tapes	5/5 stars

Seadrum/House of Sun is an album by Boredoms, released in 2004 by Warner Music Japan, and in 2005 on Vice Records in the United States. It consists of two 20-minute tracks, Seadrum and House of Sun, with the tribal drumming now generally equated with modern-day Boredoms and elements of drone music, trance music, techno, psychedelica, and Indian classical music.

Parts of the album were pieced together from previously recorded material, some of which included guitarist Yamamoto, who was no longer in the band. As its name implies, parts of the album were recorded by the ocean, and some audio was recorded directly underwater.

First Japanese editions came with a bronze-tinted booklet sheet with no rear card. Second editions came in an opaque blue jewel case. The US reissue copies the design from the second Japanese edition.

== Track listing ==
1. "Seadrum" – 23:03
2. "House of Sun" – 20:03
