= Super æ =

Studio album by Boredoms
- Released: May 25, 1998
- Recorded: March 1996–March 1998
- Genre: Experimental rock; noise rock; krautrock; space rock
- Length: 68:26
- Label: Warner Music Japan (JP); Birdman (US)
- Producer: Masanobu Kondo; Yamantaka Eye

Boredoms chronology
Super Go!!!!! (1998)	Super æ (1998)	Super Roots 7 (1998)

Alternative cover

Super æ (sometimes written as Super Ae or Super Are) is the fifth studio album by Boredoms, released in 1998. It was named the 44th greatest album of the 1990s by Pitchfork.

== Title ==
The correct pronunciation of the album's title is often debated, although according to The New Yorker's pop-music critic Sasha Frere-Jones, group frontman Yamantaka Eye has stated that the correct articulation of the "æ" symbol is simply "ah" or "ugh".

== Critical reception ==
Professional ratings
Review scores
Source	Rating
AllMusic	3/5 stars
Pitchfork	9.5/10
The Rolling Stone Album Guide	4/5 stars

Ned Raggett of AllMusic gave the album 3 stars out of 5, saying: "Taking some more of the prog/Kraut influences that crept into earlier efforts while still firing up the amps all around, Eye and his cohorts (forming a core quintet this time around) once again become the most out-there band in the world." Writing for The New Rolling Stone Album Guide, Douglas Wolk gave the album 4 stars out of 5. He called it "a pounding, astounding psychedelic masterwork, the raw power of Boredoms' early records harnessed and directed into sustained riff-laden sun worship."

== Track listing ==
No.	Title	Length
1.	"Super You"	7:37
2.	"Super Are"	8:30
3.	"Super Going"	12:24
4.	"Super Coming"	12:17
5.	"Super Are You"	8:47
6.	"Super Shine"	12:45
7.	"Super Good"	6:06

== Personnel ==
Credits adapted from liner notes.

- Yamantaka Eye – synthesizer, percussion, vocals, production, loops, electronics
- Hira – bass guitar, percussion, vocals
- Yamamoto Seiichi – guitar, vocals
- Yoshimi P-We – synthesizer, percussion, trumpet, vocals, Casio keyboard
- Atari – drums, samples, percussion
- EDA – drums, electronic percussion
- Masanobu Kondo – executive production
- Masayo Takise – mastering
- Kazvnori Akita – design
