= Pop Tatari =

Studio album by Boredoms
- Released: September 25, 1992
- Genre: Experimental rock; noise rock; psychedelic rock
- Length: 67:03; 65:25 (American release)
- Label: WEA Japan (United States) Reprise/Warner Bros. Records; 45416 (United Kingdom) Very Friendly
- Producer: Boredoms

Boredoms chronology
Michidai / Fuanteidai (1990)	Pop Tatari (1992)	Super Roots (1993)

Professional ratings
Review scores
Source	Rating
AllMusic	4.5/5 stars
Entertainment Weekly	B−
Mojo	4/5 stars
NME	8/10
Pitchfork	9.0/10
The Rolling Stone Album Guide	3/5 stars
Spin Alternative Record Guide	7/10
Uncut	4/5 stars

Pop Tatari is the third full-length album by Boredoms, released in 1992 by Warner Music Japan, in 1993 by Reprise Records, and in the United Kingdom in 2004 by Very Friendly Records.

All tracks on the album are credited to Boredoms with the exception of "Bo-Go-Bompoo," which is credited to Jet Harris.

== Track listing ==
Warner Music and Very Friendly releases
No.	Title	Length
1.	"Noise Ramones"	0:31
2.	"Nice B-O-R-E Guy & Boyoyo Touch"	0:55
3.	"Molecicco"	2:47
4.	"I Am Cola"	4:04
5.	"Telehorse Uma"	4:40
6.	"Boredom with God on Noise (Borestafari!)"	1:21
7.	"Bo-Go-Bompoo"	7:21
8.	"Heeba"	3:20
9.	"Cheeba"	9:02
10.	"Which Dooyoo Like?"	2:08
11.	"Poy (Mockin' Fuzz 1)"	4:27
12.	"Hoy"	4:33
13.	"Bore Now Bore"	2:43
14.	"Hey Bore Hey"	1:41
15.	"Cory & the Mandara Suicide Pyramid Action or Gas Satori"	10:10
16.	"TV Ramones"	3:00
17.	"Okinawa Rasta Beef (Mockin' Fuzz 2)"	3:59
18.	"Greatborefull Dead"	0:41

Reprise release
No.	Title	Length
1.	"Noise Ramones"	0:30
2.	"Nice B-O-R-E Guy & Boyoyo Touch"	0:55
3.	"Hey Bore Hey"	1:41
4.	"Bo Go" (same as "Bo Go Bompoo")	7:19
5.	"Bore Now Bore"	2:43
6.	"Okinawa Rasta Beef (Mockin' Fuzz 2)"	3:58
7.	"Which Dooyoo Like?"	2:08
8.	"Molecicco"	2:47
9.	"Telehorse Uma"	4:40
10.	"Hoy"	4:31
11.	"Bocabola" (same as "I Am Cola")	3:54
12.	"Heeba"	3:21
13.	"Poy (Mockin' Fuzz 1)"	4:27
14.	"Bod" (same as "Boredom with God on Noise")	1:20
15.	"Cheeba"	9:03
16.	"Pop Tatari" (same as "Greatborefull Dead" with extra intro)	1:58
17.	"Cory & the Mandara Suicide Pyramid Action or Gas Satori"	10:10
