= Soul Discharge =

- Japanese cover.

Studio album by Boredoms
- Released: December 1989
- Genre: Experimental rock; noise rock; hardcore punk
- Length: 28:43 (Selfish); 38:23 (Warner); 70:10 (Shimmy Disc)
- Label: Selfish (JP); WEA Japan (JP); Shimmy Disc (US, Neth.); Earthnoise (UK)

Boredoms chronology
Osorezan no Stooges Kyo (1988)	Soul Discharge (1989)	Michidai / Fuanteidai (1990)

Rerelease covers
- Soul Discharge: 1999

Professional ratings
Review scores
Source	Rating
AllMusic	4.5/5 stars
NME	7/10
The Rolling Stone Album Guide	3.5/5 stars
Spin Alternative Record Guide	8/10

Soul Discharge (ソウル・ディスチャージ) is a 1989 album by rock band Boredoms. It was named the 89th greatest album of the 1980s by Pitchfork on the site's 2002 list of the best albums of the decade.

== Track listing ==
=== Soul Discharge ===
Original Selfish Records LP release (1989)

Side 8
No.	Title	Length
1.	"Bubblebop Shot"	3:47
2.	"52 Boredom (Club Mix)"	0:36
3.	"Sun, Gun, Run"	2:47
4.	"Z & U & T & A"	4:05
5.	"TV Scorpion"	1:30

Side 96
No.	Title	Length
1.	"Pow Wow Now"	3:48
2.	"JB Dick + Tin Turner Pussy Badsmell"	3:07
3.	"G.I.L. 77'"	3:41
4.	"Jup-Na-Keeeeeel"	2:29
5.	"Catastro Mix 99'"	2:53

=== Soul Discharge '99 ===
Warner Music CD rerelease (1994)
No.	Title	Length
1.	"Your Name Is Limitless"	2:35
2.	"Bubblebop Shot"	3:47
3.	"52 Boredom (Club mix)"	0:36
4.	"Sun, Gun, Run"	2:47
5.	"Z & U & T & A"	4:05
6.	"TV Scorpion"	1:30
7.	"Pow Wow Now"	3:48
8.	"J.B. Dick + Tin Turner Pussy"	3:07
9.	"G.I.L. '77"	3:41
10.	"Jup-Na-Keeeeeeeel"	2:29
11.	"Catastro Mix '99"	2:53
12.	"Milky Way"	1:32
13.	"Songs Without Electric Guitars"	0:52
14.	"Hamaiian Disco Bollocks"	4:37
15.	"Hamaiian Disco Without Bollocks"	0:04

=== Soul Discharge/Early Boredoms ===
Despite being a CD release, the songs are divided into only two tracks.

Shimmy Disc CD rerelease (1989 in the US, 1991 in the Netherlands)
No.	Title	Length
1.	"Soul Discharge" ("Bubblebop Shot" / "52 Boredom (Club Mix)" / "Sun, Gun, Run" / "Z & U & T & A" / "TV Scorpion" / "Pow Wow Now" / "J.B. Dick + Tin Turner Pussy Badsmell" / "G.I.L. '77" / "Jup-Na-Keeeeeel" / "Catastromix '99")	28:46
2.	"Early Boredoms" ("Overdrive Asssoul" / "Okinawa in Hawaii on Saturn" / "Hairhole Burners" / "Ultramagnetyic Surfin' Bird" / "Boredomer in Boretribe" / "Nose Is My Gun" / "God from Anal" / "Jah Called AC/DC" / "Planet '75" / "Hey By Hey" / "We Are Punk / Monarchy and Testpoy" / "Don't Fall in the Audio Hole" / "We Never Sleep / Cosmic Full Sleep" / "Call Me God")	41:24
