= Chocolate Synthesizer =

Studio album by Boredoms
- Released: July 25, 1994
- Genres: Noise rock; art punk; experimental rock
- Length: 60:31
- Labels: WEA Japan, Reprise Records
- Producer: Boredoms

Boredoms chronology
Wow 2 (1993)	Chocolate Synthesizer (1994)	Super Roots 3 (1994)

Chocolate Synthesizer is the fourth studio album by the Japanese rock band Boredoms. It was originally released via WEA Japan and Reprise Records in 1994. It was recorded in four days and mixed in a week. A vinyl re-release was planned for 2013 by the California-based label 1972, but it did not occur.

Early Japanese editions of the album were packaged with a coupon offering a free mail-order only 3-inch CD, titled Super Roots 2, only available to Japanese addresses.

== Reception ==
Professional ratings
Review scores
Source	Rating
AllMusic	3/5 stars
Mojo	3/5 stars
Pitchfork	8.0/10
Rolling Stone	3/5 stars
The Rolling Stone Album Guide	4/5 stars
Spin	6/10
Spin Alternative Record Guide	7/10
Tiny Mix Tapes	4.5/5

Jon Wiederhorn of Rolling Stone gave the album 3 stars out of 5, saying, "Without question, the Boredoms are one of the most bizarre, adventurous bands on the planet, but for anyone who doesn't thrill to disjointed beats and cacophonous clatter, Chocolate Synthesizer may be a tough sweet to swallow." Meanwhile, Keith Kawaii of Tiny Mix Tapes gave the album 4.5 out of 5, saying, "The noise rock thing has been done before, of course, but rarely has it stretched this far in every direction, and rarely has it been so successful." Douglas Wolk of CMJ New Music Monthly called it "their most extraordinary and conceptually unified work to date."

In 2007, Rolling Stone Japan placed Chocolate Synthesizer at number 25 on its list of the "100 Greatest Japanese Rock Albums of All Time".

== Track listing ==
No.	Title	Length
1.	"Acid Police"	4:55
2.	"Chocolate Synthesizer"	0:51
3.	"Synthesizer Guide Book on Fire"	2:27
4.	"Shock City"	4:43
5.	"Tomato Synthesizer"	3:49
6.	"Anarchy in the UKK"	4:41
7.	"Mama Brain"	3:59
8.	"Action Synthesizer Hero"	4:15
9.	"Uoredoms"	6:01
10.	"B for Boredoms"	2:44
11.	"Eeedoms"	5:02
12.	"Smoke 7"	2:46
13.	"Turn Table Boredoms"	4:59
14.	"I'm Not Synthesizer (Ypy?)"	3:08
15.	"Now Dom Go Synthesizer Way (Why?)"	6:03
