= Osorezan no Stooges Kyo =

Studio album by Boredoms
- Released: March 1988
- Genres: Noise rock; experimental rock; hardcore punk
- Length: 35:24
- Labels: Selfish Records (JP); Earthnoise (UK)
- Producer: Boredoms

Boredoms chronology
Anal by Anal (1986)	Osorezan no Stooges Kyo (1988)	Soul Discharge (1989)

Professional ratings
Review scores
Source	Rating
The New Rolling Stone Album Guide	2/5 stars

Osorezan no Stooges Kyo is the debut studio album by Boredoms, released in 1988 on Selfish Records. The title translates to "The Stooges' Craze on Mount Osore".

== Critical reception ==
Trouser Press wrote that "structure-free sonic whirlwinds like 'Call Me God' and 'Feedbackfuck' are simultaneously far funnier than any quirk-rock smirk-fest you'd care to name and far scarier than any death-metal posing in recent memory."

== Track listing ==
1. "Wipe Out Shock Shoppers" – 0:21
2. "Boredom, Vs, Sdi" – 3:23
3. "We Never Sleep" – 2:10
4. "Bite My Bollocks" – 2:24
5. "Young Assouls" – 6:03
6. "Call Me God" – 3:18
7. "No Core Punk" – 1:11
8. "Lick'n Cock Boatpeople" – 5:11
9. "Melt Down Boogie" – 4:50
10. "Feedbackfuck" – 6:33
