= Boredoms =

Japanese rock band

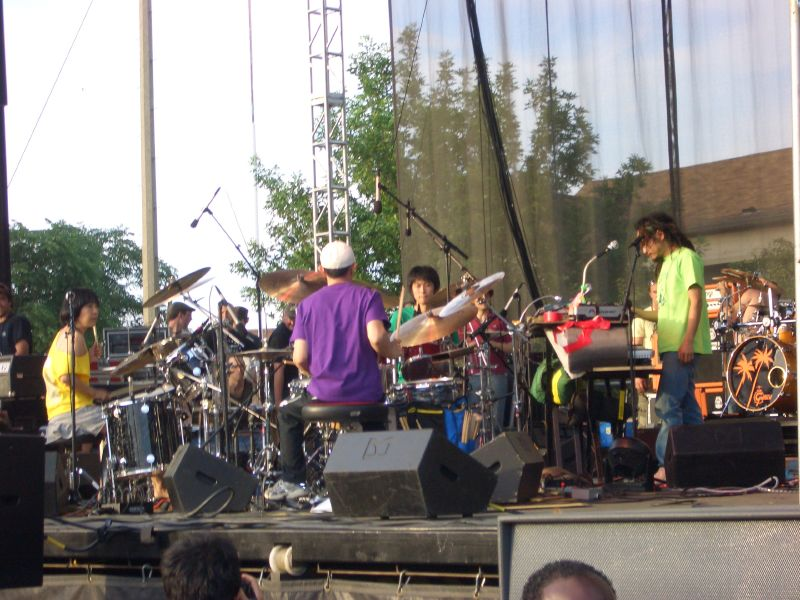
- Boredoms at the 2006 Intonation Music Festival in Chicago

Background information
- Also known as: V∞redoms, Vooredoms, V∞rdoms
- Origin: Osaka, Japan
- Genres: Experimental rock; noise rock; psychedelic rock; space rock
- Years active: 1986–present
- Labels: WEA Japan, Commmons, Thrill Jockey, Shimmy-Disc, Reprise/Warner Records, Birdman, Vice Records, Very Friendly Records, Earthnoise, Selfish Records, Trans Records
- Members: Yamantaka Eye; Yojiro Tatekawa; Yoshimi P-We; Shinji Masuko
- Past members: Muneomi Senju; Ikuo Taketani; Tabata Mitsuru; Hosoi Hisato; Makki Sasarato; Yoshikawa Toyohito; Hiyashi Hira; Seiichi Yamamoto; Chew Hasegawa; Kazuya Nishimura; EDA; God Mama
- Website: boredoms.jp

Boredoms (ボアダムス) (later known as V∞redoms) is a rock band from Osaka, Japan formed in 1986. The band's sound is often referred to as noise rock, or sometimes Japanoise (Japan's noise music scene), though their more recent records have moved toward repetitive psychedelic rock, ambient soundscapes, and tribal drumming.

The band has a vast discography. Many band members have rotated through the group over the years, often using a number of various stage names. Singer Yamantaka Eye is the closest the band has to a frontman; his style includes a range of baffling screams, babbling, electronic effects, and very heavy post-production. Drummer/keyboard player/vocalist Yoshimi P-We is featured on most Boredoms recordings.

== History ==
=== Formation and early years ===
Boredoms were formed in early 1986 by Yamantaka Eye, who at the time acted as front man for the infamous and highly controversial noise/performance art act Hanatarash, locally notorious for its extremely dangerous live shows consisting entirely of on-stage destruction and complete disregard for the audience's safety. The antics of Hanatarash would later be highly influential on the earliest incarnation of Boredoms, which was formed by the remaining members of a band Eye started with Hanatarash drummer Ikuo Taketani, as well as guitarist Tabata Mitsuru (known as Tabata Mara), bassist Hosoi Hisato, and vocalist Makki Sasarato, called "Acid Makki & Combi and Zombie". The band's sound was characterized by violent, noisy punk rock/no wave thrashings. They recorded a single track, "U.S.A.", for a compilation tape. Shortly after the release of their first song, Taketani was replaced on drums by Yoshikawa Toyohito, a friend of Eye's. The band officially changed their name to Boredoms after Hira replaced Hosoi on bass, and Sasarato left the band due to creative differences. The band's name comes from the Buzzcocks song "Boredom".

With the band finally reaching a level of stability, Eye and Tabata recorded their first official EP, Anal by Anal, in mid-1986. In early 1987, Tabata left the group to later join Zeni Geva and was replaced by Seiichi Yamamoto as guitar player. In March 1988, the band released its first full-length, Osorezan no Stooges Kyo. Due to unhappiness over Yoshikawa's drumming, Yoshimi P-We from Eye's Hanatarash-related project UFO or Die was asked to serve as drummer, becoming the first female member of the band, with Yoshikawa switching to general percussion. Shortly after the change Yoshikawa left the group, to be replaced by Chew Hasegawa (now of Japanese funeral doom band Corrupted) and then by Kazuya Nishimura, known by his stage name Atari. The band's sound from this period was marked by harsh, dissonant punk edited extensively by Eye in the studio, citing Sonic Youth and Funkadelic as influences, among others. This style was seen by some as "pointlessly abrasive" without any underlying motive, making Boredoms nihilistic absolute music, according to some critics; however, the strangeness of the record increased the band's popularity in the musical underground.

=== Growing popularity ===
In 1988 and 1989, Eye found himself making friends with Sonic Youth and also worked extensively with John Zorn's polystylistic Naked City project, serving as guest vocalist. After the release of Boredoms' album Soul Discharge in the United States, the band was able to parlay their growing popularity into long term record deals with Warner Bros. Records in Japan and its United States imprint Reprise Records. With the release of the band's critically acclaimed Pop Tatari, generally seen as one of the strangest albums ever released by a major label, Boredoms took to the road and toured with Sonic Youth in 1992, Nirvana for eight consecutive shows in late October and early November 1993, and Brutal Truth in 1993. During this period, the band was asked by Steve Albini to record a track for a compilation he was recording. Shortly after Eye again collaborated with John Zorn on an EP under the name Mystic Fugu Orchestra, which was notably the first album released on Zorn's Tzadik Records.

The following year, at the height of its popularity in the United States, the band was asked to perform on the main stage of the 1994 Lollapalooza tour in support of the album Chocolate Synthesizer, which had just been released in the United States. The album proved largely successful for such an experimental band and was later considered one of the best albums of the 1990s by Alternative Press magazine. Yoshikawa had later joined the band in the early months of 1994 for a second time to play on Pop Tatari, often sharing vocal duties with Eye, but left again in 1994 and was replaced on percussion by EDA, who had been introduced to the band by Pavement bassist Mark Ibold. The band was dropped from the Reprise roster, with Birdman Records distributing the band's Super Roots EPs during this period.

By the time of 1998's Super Go!!!!! EP and full-length Super æ, the band started to break sharply from their earlier atonal noise rock/Japanoise sound by introducing many elements of sweeping electronica effects and thoroughly constructed psychedelic rock jams into their music. Perceived analogies with the music of Can became common during this period. Described as "tumultuous space-sludge", Super æ has most often been compared to the defining elements of 1970s krautrock. Soon after its initial release in Japan, Super æ was met with a considerable amount of acclaim from the international music press, recognized as a modern-day avant-garde artifact and progressive "masterpiece". Notably, Super æ was considered one of the best albums of the 1990s by Pitchfork Media.

"◯" (circle)
"◯" from Vision Creation Newsun. This clip highlights the band's newer psychedelic tribal jam sound.

In 1999, the band released Vision Creation Newsun in Japan. This album saw an evolution in their sound, combining the evolving space rock themes explored in their Super Roots EPs and preceding album Super æ with "a much more earthly, primal, primitively worshipful inspiration". It features psychedelic soundscaping and "cosmic synths", complex tribal drumming, "cathartic celebrations of noise", and Eye's unique power electronic and turntabalistic stylings. The album is often considered the band's greatest achievement thus far, and has been described by critics as blending the "manic, high-speed, cut-up form punk rock" of their earlier albums with a new sound that is "just as intense and exhilarating, but more beautiful and more expansive".

After its release, Eye oversaw a series of remix albums of the Boredoms catalogue by guest DJs. After the final remix album, Eye's own Rebore, vol. 0, was released in 2000, Boredoms seemed to disappear for a few years with no releases or tour dates, while the members participated in various side projects and other bands.

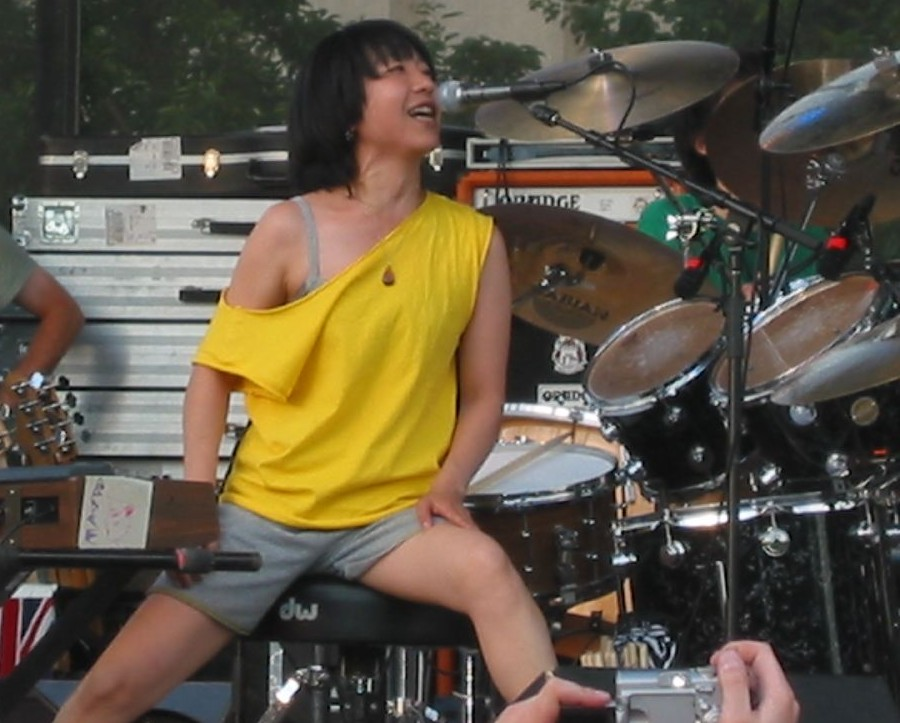
Yoshimi P-We performing at the 2006 Intonation Music Festival in Chicago

=== Later activities ===
Rumors that the band had broken up began to circulate, but a smaller ensemble who called themselves V∞redoms resurfaced in 2003. The group's line-up had changed considerably upon its return, stripping down to a much smaller ensemble with Yamantaka Eye on vocals, Izumi Kiyoshi (who had performed on Vision Creation Newsun and Super æ) on synthesizer, and Yoshimi P-We, Nishimura, and EDA playing drums and percussion.

Despite the changes, the group's music still revolves around the tribal drumming patterns heard on Vision Creation Newsun. The band was signed by Vice Records for its releases in the United States since it had been dropped by Reprise. All Super Roots releases were then reissued on Vice in early 2007 (with the exclusion of Super Roots 2). In late 2004, Boredoms released its first album as a group in four years, Seadrum/House of Sun, most of which had been previously recorded before the band's brief hiatus. This release also saw the band move from their label WEA Japan to the smaller Japanese label Commmons. The album was not celebrated to the extent of their previous albums, yet it still garnered mostly positive reviews, with a score of 73% on Metacritic. Following its release, EDA left the band and went on to form audio-visual project Adrena Adrena with visual artist Daisy Dickinson. EDA was replaced in the Boredoms by Yojiro Tatekawa.

In early 2007, the group released Super Roots 9, the first addition to the Super Roots series since 1999 and their first major release since Seadrum/House of Sun. It was recorded during a Christmas Eve 2004 concert, making it only the band's third official live release since 1998's Super Seeeeee!!!!!! video (discounting disc two of the Vision Creation Newsun boxset, which included a 35-minute excerpt of a live concert). Super Roots 9 also saw the band move from Warner International to the smaller Japanese label Commmons for domestic releases and American label Thrill Jockey for overseas. Later, in April, the group (as V∞redoms) played three dates with Sonic Youth in Japan. The band also planned to attempt using newly developed contact microphones to record the sounds made by the human body while dancing.

The band released a live DVD/CD combination called Live at Sunflancisco in December 2007 followed by the remix single Voaltz / Relerer in August 2008, while Eye and Yoshimi have come out with new records of their own this year. During a 2008 United States tour with Iron & Wine, Eye used a new seven-necked guitar called the "Sevener" or "Sevena".

The band released another addition to the Super Roots EP series, titled Super Roots 10, on January 28, 2009.

==== Boadrum performances and concerts ====
On July 7, 2007, Boredoms performed a concert entitled 77 Boadrum at the Empire–Fulton Ferry section of Brooklyn Bridge Park in Brooklyn, New York City New York with drummer Muneomi Senju replacing Nishimura. The "77" denoted not only the date (7/7/2007) and the start time (7:07pm EDT) but also the number of drummers in the ensemble. Eye has said that the number 77 became significant to him when he climbed the Temple of the Sun in Palenque and counted 77 steps.

The band continued the concept on August 8, 2008, with two concerts called 88 Boadrum held in Los Angeles and Brooklyn. Boredoms headlined the Los Angeles show while Gang Gang Dance conducted the Brooklyn show. At 8:08pm PDT on 8/8/08, 88 drummers played for 88 minutes at the La Brea Tar Pits in Los Angeles. A third concert, Boadrum 9, took place on September 9, 2009 at 9:09pm EDT at Terminal 5 in Manhattan, New York City. It featured 9 drummers in total, two from Boredoms (Yoshimi and Yojiro) and seven others from prominent experimental music acts, namely Zach Hill (Hella), Hisham Bharoocha (Soft Circle, ex: Black Dice, Lightning Bolt), Butchy Fuego (Pit er Pat), Kid Millions (Oneida), Jeremy Hyman (Ponytail), Dave Nuss (No-Neck Blues Band) and Aaron Moore (Volcano The Bear)

In 2010, Boredoms toured internationally including two Boadrum performances at All Tomorrow's Parties curated by Matt Groening at Butlins Minehead, England, in addition to shows in London, Japan, Mexico and as part of the Melbourne International Arts Festival on October 10, 2010.

The last numbered Boadrum event was 111Boadrum, on November 11, 2011, at Byron Bay at 11:11am. Notable drummers included Zach Hill, Hisham Bharoocha, Jermey Hyman, Butchey Fuego, and Mat Watson. There were 11 drummers and 100 cymbal players for a total of 111 performers.

In 2011, Boredoms premiered new material at the All Tomorrows Parties "I'll Be Your Mirror" festival in Tokyo. Six drummers were arranged in a circle around Eye, who used motion sensors to trigger ambient drone soundscapes created by Shinji Masuko that corresponded to each drummer. The music featured highly repetitive motorik rhythms that grew in complexity over the course of the hour long set. The band was chosen by Jeff Mangum of Neutral Milk Hotel to perform at the All Tomorrow's Parties festival that he curated in March 2012 in Minehead, England. That gig (performed twice during the festival) featured 14 guitarists and 6 drummers.

In June 2015, Boredoms performed another development of the Boardrum series at the Barbican Centre in London, UK as part of Doug Aitken's Station to Station: A 30-Day Happening. The performance featured Eye, Yoshimi, Tatekawa, Masuko, and an expanded lineup of drummers and guitarists surrounded by 88 percussionists all playing cymbals.

== Discography ==
- Osorezan no Stooges Kyo (1988)
- Soul Discharge (1989)
- Pop Tatari (1992)
- Chocolate Synthesizer (1994)
- Super æ (1998)
- Vision Creation Newsun (1999)
- Seadrum/House of Sun (2004)

== Members ==
- Yamantaka Eye – lead vocals, noise, sampler, sevena, programming
- Yoshimi P-We – drums, percussion, vocals, djembe, keyboards, trumpet
- Yojiro Tatekawa – drums, percussion
- Shinji Masuko – guitars, noise, tape machine, turntables, programming

=== Previous members ===
- Muneomi Senju – drums, percussion
- Ikuo Taketani – drums
- Hosoi Hisato – bass guitar
- Tabata Mitsuru (Tabata Mara) – guitar
- Hiyashi Hira – bass guitar, vocals, percussion
- Seiichi Yamamoto – guitar, vocals, percussion
- Yoshikawa Toyohito – drums, vocals
- Chew Hasegawa – drums
- Kazuya Nishimura (Atari or ATR) – drums, synthesizer, vocals, sampler, djembe, programming
- EDA – drums, electronic drums, djembe
- Izumi Kiyoshi – synthesizer, sampler, programming
- God Mama – dancing
- Zach Hill - drums, percussion

== See also ==
- Z-Rock Hawaii
- OOIOO
- Rovo
