= Live in Chicago (Ween album) =

Live album by Ween
- Released: May 4, 2004
- Recorded: November 8 & 9, 2003
- Venues: The Vic Theatre in Chicago, Illinois
- Genre: Rock
- Label: Sanctuary
- Director: Zane Vella

Ween chronology
All Request Live (2003)	Live in Chicago (2004)	Shinola, Vol. 1 (2005)

Professional ratings
Review scores
Source	Rating
AllMusic	4/5 stars
The Rolling Stone Album Guide	3/5 stars

Live in Chicago is a live album by the American rock band Ween, released in 2004. It is the band's fifth live album, and the second album overall that they released on Sanctuary Records. The album's performance took place at The Vic Theatre in Chicago, Illinois, USA.

Packaged alternately as a CD with bonus DVD or a DVD with bonus CD, Live in Chicago documents two nights of a show the group did in Chicago in support of their album Quebec. The DVD features a wide variety of Ween songs, covering every Ween album except 12 Golden Country Greats and even features a cover of the Led Zeppelin song, "All My Love". Also, the DVD contains alternate camera angles for three of the performances, and a bonus music video for the song "Transdermal Celebration".

The CD, in comparison, contains fewer songs and a different track list.

== Track listing (DVD) ==
All songs written by Ween, except "All My Love" by John Paul Jones and Robert Plant.

No.	Title	Length
1.	"Buckingham Green"
2.	"Spinal Meningitis (Got Me Down)"
3.	"Pork Roll Egg and Cheese"
4.	"Take Me Away"
5.	"The Grobe"
6.	"Transdermal Celebration"
7.	"Even If You Don't"
8.	"Voodoo Lady"
9.	"Baby Bitch"
10.	"The HIV Song"
11.	"Roses Are Free"
12.	"Mutilated Lips"
13.	"Chocolate Town"
14.	"I'll Be Your Jonny on the Spot"
15.	"Touch My Tooter"
16.	"The Argus"
17.	"Zoloft"
18.	"Ocean Man"
19.	"Don't Laugh (I Love You)"
20.	"All My Love"
21.	"Big Jilm"
22.	"You Fucked Up"
23.	"Doctor Rock"
24.	"She Fucks Me" (Encore)
25.	"Booze Me Up and Get Me High"
26.	"The Blarney Stone"

== Track listing (CD) ==
No.	Title	Length
1.	"Take Me Away"	3:02
2.	"The Grobe"	3:17
3.	"Transdermal Celebration"	3:33
4.	"Even If You Don't"	4:20
5.	"Voodoo Lady"	7:30
6.	"The HIV Song"	1:54
7.	"Baby Bitch"	3:26
8.	"Roses Are Free"	6:03
9.	"Mutilated Lips"	4:37
10.	"Chocolate Town"	3:23
11.	"I'll Be Your Jonny on the Spot"	4:29
12.	"Buckingham Green"	3:57
13.	"Spinal Meningitis (Got Me Down)"	3:08
14.	"Pork Roll Egg and Cheese"	2:30
15.	"The Argus"	4:57
16.	"Zoloft"	7:05
17.	"Ocean Man"	2:15
Total length:		1:08:26

== Personnel ==
Ween:

- Dean Ween - guitar, vocals; bass guitar on “Don’t Laugh (I Love You)”
- Gene Ween - vocals, guitar; mandolin on “Ocean Man”
- Claude Coleman Jr. - drums, percussion, electronic drums, drum machine, vocals
- Dave Dreiwitz - bass guitar, vocals
- Glenn McClelland - keyboards, theremin, vocals
