= Live in Toronto Canada =

Live album by Ween featuring the Shit Creek Boys
- Released: 2001
- Recorded: October 23, 1996
- Genre: Alternative rock
- Length: 76:00
- Label: Chocodog
- Producer: Kirk Miller (Engineer, Mixing)

Ween chronology
White Pepper (2000)	Live in Toronto Canada (2001)	Live at Stubb's, 7/2000 (2002)

Professional ratings
Review scores
Source	Rating
Allmusic	link

Live in Toronto Canada, is the second live album by the American rock band Ween, released in 2001 on their own Chocodog label. It was recorded during the now legendary tour with Bobby Ogdin and the Shit Creek Boys on October 23, 1996, at the Phoenix Theatre in Toronto, Ontario. The setlist is divided evenly between 12 Golden Country Greats tunes and previous fan favorites such as "Push th' Little Daisies" and "Buenas Tardes Amigo". The album was reissued on vinyl in 2018 by Schnitzel Records.

== Track listing ==
All songs by Ween, except "Piano Man" by Billy Joel.

No.	Title	Length
1.	"Pretty Girl"	2:55
2.	"What Deaner Was Talkin' About"	2:13
3.	"Japanese Cowboy"	4:26
4.	"Pumpin' 4 the Man"	2:17
5.	"Mister Richard Smoker"	3:15
6.	"Spinal Meningitis (Got Me Down)"	3:34
7.	"Help Me Scrape the Mucus off My Brain"	2:56
8.	"Waving My Dick in the Wind"	3:06
9.	"Push th' Little Daisies"	2:48
10.	"Buenas Tardes Amigo"	10:37
11.	"Poop Ship Destroyer"	5:58
12.	"I'm Holding You"	6:55
13.	"Doctor Rock"	5:15
14.	"The HIV Song"	3:14
15.	"Piano Man"	2:05
16.	"Fluffy"	14:20
Total length:		1:16:00

== Personnel ==
Ween

- Gene Ween – vocals, acoustic guitar
- Dean Ween – vocals, lead guitar
- Claude Coleman Jr. – drums, percussion

The Shit Creek Boys

- Bobby Ogdin – piano, keyboards, vocals
- Matt Kohut – bass guitar
- Danny Parks – rhythm guitar
- Stu Basore – pedal steel guitar
- Hank Singer – fiddle

Technician

- Ben Vaughn - Producer
- Kirk Miller - Live mixing, Engineer
- Greg Frey - mastering (CD)
- Bobby Ogdin - back cover photo (CD)
- Dean Ween - Liner Notes (Vinyl)
- Hendrik Pauler - Remastering (Vinyl)
- Cotter - Front cover illustration
- Patricia Frey - Cover Layout
- Aaron Tanner - Inter Layout
- Paul Monaghan - Inter photo photographer
- Mick Preston - Guitar Tech, Roadie

== Cover art ==
The cover art is a parody of the 1964 Frank Sinatra/Count Basie album It Might as Well Be Swing.
