= Live at Stubb's (Ween album) =

Live album by Ween
- Released: December 2002
- Recorded: July 7–8, 2000
- Venues: Stubb’s BBQ, Austin Texas
- Genre: Alternative rock
- Length: 160:56
- Label: Chocodog
- Producer: Andrew Weiss

Ween chronology
Live In Toronto Canada (2001)	Live at Stubb's (2002)	Quebec (2003)

Professional ratings
Review scores
Source	Rating
AllMusic	4.5/5 stars

Live at Stubb's is a live album by the American rock band Ween, released in 2003. It was recorded during two dates at Stubb's in Austin, Texas in July, 2000. There are three discs of material, including material from all seven studio albums the band had released at that point, three songs not officially released on a previous Ween album, and a Van Halen cover song. The third disc contains only the song "L.M.L.Y.P.", in both audio and video (MPEG) format.

== Track listing ==
All songs written by Ween, except "Hot for Teacher" by Eddie Van Halen, Alex Van Halen, David Lee Roth, and Michael Anthony.

=== Disc one ===
No.	Title	Date of recording	Length
1.	"Buckingham Green"	July 7	5:09
2.	"Spinal Meningitis (Got Me Down)"	July 7	3:40
3.	"The Stallion (Pt. 3)"	July 7	3:50
4.	"Bananas and Blow"	July 7	4:31
5.	"Waving My Dick in the Wind"	July 7	2:45
6.	"Mister Richard Smoker"	July 7	3:03
7.	"Fat Lenny"	July 7	5:28
8.	"Even If You Don't"	July 7	3:46
9.	"Voodoo Lady"	July 7	10:19
10.	"The HIV Song"	July 7	2:08
11.	"Marble Tulip Juicy Tree"	July 7	6:52
12.	"Back to Basom"	July 7	5:08
13.	"Captain Fantasy"	July 8	3:07
14.	"Sketches of Winkle"	July 7	2:39
15.	"Mister, Would You Please Help My Pony?"	July 7	3:25
16.	"Ocean Man"	July 7	2:42

=== Disc two ===
No.	Title	Date of recording	Length
1.	"Exactly Where I'm At"	July 7	4:08
2.	"Booze Me Up and Get Me High"	July 7	4:24
3.	"Stroker Ace"	July 7	2:35
4.	"A Tear for Eddie"	July 8	8:29
5.	"Big Jilm"	July 8	5:10
6.	"Little Birdy"	July 8	3:36
7.	"Squelch the Weasel"	July 7	2:35
8.	"Sorry Charlie"	July 7	4:10
9.	"Wayne's Pet Youngin"	July 7	1:35
10.	"Hot for Teacher" (Van Halen cover)	July 7	5:44
11.	"Ice Castles"	July 8	2:45
12.	"She Wanted to Leave"	July 8	2:53
13.	"Put the Coke on My Dick"	July 8	3:48
14.	"Homo Rainbow"	July 7	3:41

=== Disc three ===
No.	Title	Date of Recording	Length
1.	"L.M.L.Y.P." (plus bonus MPEG video)	July 8	36:39

== Personnel ==
- Dean Ween – lead guitar, vocals, talk box
- Gene Ween – vocals, rhythm guitar, mandolin
- Claude Coleman Jr. – drums, drum machine, electric crotales, production
- Dave Dreiwitz – bass, backing vocals
- Glenn McClellan – synthesizers, piano, Moog, Hammond organ, Mellotron, vocoder
