= Powder Blue =

Powder Blue may refer to:

- Powder blue, a shade of blue
- Powder Blue (film), written and directed by Timothy Linh Bui
- "Powder Blue", by Ween from 12 Golden Country Greats, 1996
- "Powder Blue", by Elbow from Asleep in the Back, 2001
- "Powder Blue", by Ty Dolla Sign featuring Gunna from Featuring Ty Dolla Sign, 2020
- Powder Blues, a 1983 album by the Powder Blues Band
