= Paintin' the Town Brown: Ween Live 1990–1998 =

Paintin' the Town Brown

Live album by Ween
- Released: June 22, 1999
- Recorded: December 1990 – November 19, 1997
- Genre: Rock
- Length: 2:06:56
- Label: Elektra
- Producers: Greg Frey, Kirk Miller, Ween

Ween chronology
The Mollusk (1997)	Paintin' the Town Brown (1999)	White Pepper (2000)

Professional ratings
Review scores
Source	Rating
AllMusic	3.5/5 stars
Pitchfork Media	7.8/10
The Rolling Stone Album Guide	3/5 stars

Paintin' the Town Brown is a live compilation by American rock band Ween, released by Elektra Records on June 22, 1999.

Paintin' the Town Brown serves as a live retrospective for the group, a 2-CD set containing songs from Ween's first live shows (which were simply Dean, Gene, and a DAT deck) to Ween's tour in support of The Mollusk (though no songs from that particular album are featured).

This album was initially meant to be the first release on Ween's own record label Chocodog, but Elektra took the project away from the group and released it themselves. This would serve as part of the basis for Ween's departure from Elektra.

== Track listing ==
=== Disc one ===
All tracks are written by Gene & Dean Ween, except where noted.

No.	Title	Writer(s)	Source	Length
1.	"Mushroom Festival in Hell"		Holland 1/91	2:48
2.	"Japanese Cowboy"	Ween / "Vangelis" Evanghelos Papathanassiou	Santa Monica Civic Auditorium, Santa Monica, CA (October 11, 1996)	4:21
3.	"Mountain Dew"	Bascom Lamar Lunsford, Scott Wiseman	Cicero's, St. Louis, MO (March 14, 1992)	5:20
4.	"Bumblebee"		Switzerland 12/90	1:23
5.	"Voodoo Lady"		Amsterdam 12/97	6:48
6.	"Ode to Rene"		San Francisco, CA 2/93	2:24
7.	"Mister Richard Smoker"		Santa Monica Civic Auditorium, Santa Monica, CA (October 11, 1996)	3:08
8.	"Doctor Rock"		Melbourne, Australia 5/95	3:10
9.	"I Can't Put My Finger on It"		Oslo, Norway 12/97	8:48
10.	"Cover It with Gas and Set It on Fire"		Trenton, NJ '93	1:20
11.	"Awesome Sound"		Amsterdam, Holland 12/97	7:54
12.	"Tender Situation"		Leeuwarden, Holland 12/90	4:33
13.	"Mister, Would You Please Help My Pony?"		Oslo, Norway 12/97	3:56
14.	"I Saw Gener Cryin' in His Sleep"		Santa Monica Civic Auditorium, Santa Monica, CA (October 11, 1996)	2:15
15.	"Marble Tulip Juicy Tree"		Warfield Theatre, San Francisco, CA (April 30, 1996)	5:36
16.	"She Fucks Me"		9:30 Club, Washington, D.C. (October 28, 1996)	3:53
Total length:				1:07:17

=== Disc two ===
No.	Title	Source	Length
1.	"Poop Ship Destroyer"	The Blue Note, Columbia, MO (January 31, 1995)	26:07
2.	"Vallejo"	Huntridge Theater, Las Vegas, NV (November 14, 1994)	30:48
3.	"Puffy Cloud"	Los Angeles, CA 10/94 (unverified)	3:04
Total length:			59:39

== Personnel ==
=== Mushroom Festival in Hell ===
- Gene Ween - vocals
- Dean Ween – guitar, vocals; bass guitar, drums [DAT]

=== Japanese Cowboy ===
- Gene Ween - vocals
- Dean Ween – lead guitar
- Claude Coleman – drums
- Bobby Ogdin – percussion, piano, keyboard
- Matt Kohut – bass guitar
- Danny Parks – rhythm guitar
- Stu Basore – pedal steel
- Hank Singer – fiddle, percussion

=== Mountain Dew ===
- Gene Ween - backing vocals
- Dean Ween – vocals, guitar; bass guitar, drum machine [DAT]

=== Bumblebee ===
- Gene Ween - vocals
- Dean Ween – guitar; bass guitar, drums [DAT]

=== Voodoo Lady ===
- Gene Ween - vocals, rhythm guitar
- Dean Ween – lead guitar, vocals
- Claude Coleman – drums, backing vocals
- Dave Dreiwitz – bass guitar
- Glenn McClelland – keyboards

=== Ode To Rene ===
- Gene Ween - vocals
- Dean Ween - guitar, vocals; bass guitar, drum machine [DAT]

=== Mister Richard Smoker ===
- Gene Ween - vocals
- Dean Ween – lead guitar, vocals
- Claude Coleman – drums
- Bobby Ogdin – percussion, piano, keyboard
- Matt Kohut – bass guitar
- Danny Parks – rhythm guitar
- Stu Basore – pedal steel
- Hank Singer – fiddle, percussion

=== Doctor Rock ===
- Gene Ween - vocals
- Dean Ween – guitar, backing vocals
- Claude Coleman – drums
- Andrew Weiss – bass guitar, backing vocals

=== I Can’t Put My Finger On It ===
- Gene Ween - vocals
- Dean Ween – guitar
- Claude Coleman – drums
- Dave Dreiwitz – bass guitar
- Glenn McClelland – keyboards

=== Cover It with Gas and Set It on Fire ===
- Gene Ween - backing vocals
- Dean Ween – vocals, guitar; bass guitar, cowbell [DAT]

=== Awesome Sound ===
- Gene Ween - rhythm guitar, backing vocals
- Dean Ween – vocals, lead guitar
- Claude Coleman – drums
- Dave Dreiwitz – bass guitar
- Glenn McClelland – keyboards

=== Tender Situation ===
- Gene Ween - guitar, vocals
- Dean Ween - vocals; bass guitar, drum machine [DAT]

=== Mister, Would You Please Help My Pony? ===
- Gene Ween - vocals
- Dean Ween – guitar, vocals
- Claude Coleman – drums, backing vocals
- Dave Dreiwitz – bass guitar
- Glenn McClelland – keyboards

=== I Saw Gener Crying in His Sleep ===
- Gene Ween - backing vocals, tambourine
- Dean Ween – vocals, lead guitar
- Claude Coleman – drums
- Bobby Ogdin – percussion, piano, keyboard
- Matt Kohut – bass guitar
- Danny Parks – rhythm guitar
- Stu Basore – pedal steel
- Hank Singer – fiddle, percussion

=== Marble Tulip Juice Tree ===
- Gene Ween - vocals, acoustic guitar
- Dean Ween – lead guitar; bass guitar, drums [DAT]

=== She Fucks Me ===
- Gene Ween - acoustic guitar, backing vocals
- Dean Ween – vocals, acoustic guitar
- Claude Coleman – drums
- Matt Kohut - bass guitar
- Stu Basore – pedal steel

=== Poopship Destroyer ===
- Gene Ween - vocals
- Dean Ween – guitar
- Claude Coleman – drums
- Andrew Weiss – bass guitar

=== Vallejo ===
- Gene Ween - vocals
- Dean Ween – guitar
- Claude Coleman – drums
- Andrew Weiss – bass guitar

=== Puffy Cloud ===
- Gene Ween - vocals, acoustic guitar
- Dean Ween - vocals, acoustic guitar
- Claude Coleman - drums, backing vocals
- Andrew Weiss - bass guitar

=== Technical ===
- Greg Frey – producer, compilation, editing
- Kirk Miller – co-producer, compilation; mixing on (tracks 2, 3, 5-11, 13-19)
- Pidah Kloos – mixing (tracks 1, 4, 12)
- Ween – producer, compilation
- Dean Ween - liner notes
- Gregory Burke – design
- Christopher J. Falvey – cover design

== Charts ==
Chart performance for Paintin' the Town Brown
Chart (1999)	Peak position
US Heatseekers Albums (Billboard)	37
