= The Mollusk =

Studio album by Ween
- Released: June 24, 1997
- Recorded: 1996–1997
- Studio: Various: The Flood Zone (Holgate, New Jersey); Stoney Brook (Hopewell, New Jersey); The Zion House of Flesh (Hopewell, New Jersey); Byoak Farms (Holicong, Pennsylvania); Tuff Guy (Vernon, New Jersey); Gener's Apartments (Stockton, New Jersey; New Hope, Pennsylvania)
- Genre: Experimental rock
- Length: 44:05
- Label: Elektra
- Producer: Andrew Weiss

Ween chronology
12 Golden Country Greats (1996)	The Mollusk (1997)	Paintin' the Town Brown: Ween Live 1990–1998 (1999)

Singles from The Mollusk
- 1. "Mutilated Lips" Released: June 1997; 2. "Ocean Man" Released: October 6, 1997

The Mollusk is the sixth studio album by American rock band Ween, released by Elektra Records on June 24, 1997. It is a multi-genre concept album with a dark nautical theme, with several songs incorporating elements from psychedelia and/or sea shanties, while also featuring a heavy progressive rock influence. Dean Ween described the album as "the only record that I ever felt really confident about" and "my favorite record we've ever done". Gene Ween has echoed this sentiment, saying: "The Mollusk is probably my favorite, at the end of the day".

== Background ==
Starting with the release of their 1994 album Chocolate and Cheese, Aaron Freeman and Mickey Melchiondo—known by their stage names Gene and Dean Ween, respectively—began to significantly enhance their approach to studio recording. While their earlier albums were almost entirely recorded by Freeman and Melchiondo themselves at their home using a 4-track recorder, Chocolate and Cheese marked the first time the band produced an album in a professional recording studio. It also notably began their transition from a duo to a more traditional band with the addition of drummer Claude Coleman, allowing Freeman and Melchiondo to experiment with a wider range of musical styles than they could with the drum machine they had used on previous releases.

Though Ween's 1996 album 12 Golden Country Greats was their first record to feature a full-fledged band on each track, the songs were recorded with various Nashville session musicians, so it was viewed by the band as more of a spin-off album, in the vein of The Beach Boys' Christmas Album, than a true follow-up to Chocolate and Cheese. The Mollusk was the debut album for keyboardist Glenn McClelland, and, with bassist Dave Dreiwitz joining shortly before the album's release, the band finally evolved into the final five-person incarnation that continues to this day.

The cover art for The Mollusk was created by Storm Thorgerson, the graphic designer who designed many of Pink Floyd's album covers, including The Dark Side of the Moon. Thorgerson liked the album so much that, although he was only hired to do the cover art, he decided to do the related promo and poster art, including all of the initial print ads associated with The Mollusk, for no extra charge.

== Recording and release ==
After recording 1994's Chocolate and Cheese in a professional studio, Gene and Dean Ween decided they wanted to return to their early method of recording albums at home. In 1995, they relocated their recording equipment to a rented beach house on the shore of Holgate, New Jersey, and the equipment and some of the early materials for the album were nearly lost when a water pipe burst in the house while it was unoccupied. At this point, the band put this album on hold and made plans to record 1996's 12 Golden Country Greats in Nashville. After recording 12 Golden Country Greats in 1995 and releasing and touring behind it, Ween completed the remaining tracking of The Mollusk at various inland locations. The album was mixed by Andrew Weiss at the Magic Shop studio in New York City. For the mixing, Weiss used the studio's vintage Neve console and a Digidesign Pro-Tools system.

A few months after the July 1996 release of 12 Golden Country Greats, there were rumors on the internet that Ween would be releasing a new double album in 1997; by this time, it was already known that the new album was going to be titled The Mollusk. The album was eventually released by Elektra on June 24, 1997, although some sources incorrectly list the release date as being in April 1997. Like with their previous releases on Elektra, the album only charted in Australia and the United States, appearing in the lower reaches of the latter country's charts. On the Australian release of The Mollusk, there is a sticker warning that the album is for an 18+ audience, due to explicit language. However, on the U.S. release there is no parental advisory sticker.

== Music and lyrics ==
AllMusic labelled it as being another "multi-genre extravaganza" like Chocolate and Cheese, in contrast to 12 Golden Country Greats, which focused on a single genre. The album draws from celtic rock, country, cowpunk, electronica, 17th century folk music, jazz, new wave, progressive rock, psychedelia, punk, soft rock, symphonic rock, show tunes, surf rock and vaudeville. At the time, the album's overall sound was described as "gay sea shanties".

The opening track "I'm Dancing in the Show Tonight" incorporates elements from vaudeville and show tunes. In a July 2017 interview for the album's 20th anniversary, Dean Ween said that the music from the song came from an old ballet practice record his sister had. The band made the song during their first recording session with keyboardist Glenn McClelland, who they met at a bar in 1996. Ween had McClelland's two-year-old son Charlie sing on the song. McClelland only became an official member of Ween in April 1997, first performing with them in May 1997, meaning it may have been recorded in 1997 as one of the last songs for the album. According to Dean Ween, "everybody sang on the song", and there were 11 other vocal tracks mixed in with Charlie McClelland's voice, which was the most prominent one on the song. The vocal tracks were all at different speeds, which Dean Ween said "[made it sound] really fucked up". Some incorrectly believed that the high pitched vocals were simply achieved through pitch shifting Dean Ween's voice. Between the summer of 1997 and the end of that year, it was played live 31 times, but only sporadically appeared in Ween's setlists during later years. The recording session for "I'm Dancing in the Show Tonight" also yielded an additional song called "Boys Club", which had a poppy 1970s-esque yacht rock sound. This song didn't make it to The Mollusk, and was later included on the 2005 rarities album Shinola, Vol. 1.

The single "Ocean Man" has a tropical surf rock sound, while "Pink Eye (On My Leg)" is a jazz and psychedelic tinged instrumental which has sound clips of a dog barking. "I'll Be Your Jonny on the Spot" is a fast punk influenced track. The lyrics are about the phrase itself "I'll Be Your Johnny on the Spot", which is used to mean someone you can rely on to pull through for you. It debuted live while the band were on tour for 12 Golden Country Greats, and this early live version had country instrumentation rather than distorted punk instrumentation. "Buckingham Green" incorporates symphonic rock elements, and the song's title may have been a reference to a shopping center called "Buckingham Green", which is located near the band's hometown of New Hope, Pennsylvania. In July 1997, Ben Ratliff of The New York Times described the song as being about an eyeball that frees itself from a child's face and floats above an English park. "The Blarney Stone" incorporates sea shanty and celtic rock elements, and like "I'll Be Your Johnny on the Spot", had earlier been performed live with country instrumentation. It is lyrically about a tattoo artist friend of the band named Joe Rose. "Waving My Dick in the Wind" is a country/cowpunk song, and the most country-influenced track on The Mollusk, with the band having originally considered recording it with the Nashville musicians for 12 Golden Country Greats. It has been described as a "leftover country tune". "Cold Blows the Wind" was inspired from an old book of 17th century folk songs that Gene Ween had. "She Wanted to Leave" has been called an homage/parody of the British progressive rock band The Moody Blues.

"It's Gonna Be (Alright)" is a soft rock ballad with subtle electronic elements, and has lyrics inspired by a breakup Gene Ween was going through. When it was written, he was feeling depressed and didn't have his head in the right mindset to make music, so Dean Ween cheered him up by taking him for a night of gambling at Atlantic City. The band ended up winning money while gambling and spent it at a steakhouse. The song has rarely been performed live by the band, only being played a few times on the subsequent tour for The Mollusk.

== Touring and promotion ==
No music videos were made in conjunction with Elektra for The Mollusk. To promote the upcoming album, Ween performed "The Golden Eel" on the Comedy Central show Viva Variety, with this being their first live performance with Glenn McClelland on keyboards. Ween then appeared as guests on Oddville, MTV, where they performed the single "Mutilated Lips". The performance was taped on June 10, 1997, before the show itself premiered on June 16, 1997, and Ween's episode didn't air until July 17, 1997. Ween's next performance was at KTCL's Big Adventure in Denver, Colorado on June 28, 1997, with this also being their first performance after the album's release. Ween continued to tour the album throughout the United States up until September 1997. In October 1997, Ween went on a tour of the Pacific, playing two shows in New Zealand, nine shows in Australia and a single show in Japan and Hawaii. They followed these shows up with a tour of Europe, which lasted between November and early December 1997. In January 1998, they returned to playing shows in the United States, before taking a three-month break, eventually returning for more U.S. shows on April 18, 1998. Later in 1998, they voiced themselves on the South Park episode "Chef Aid". For South Park, they recorded a folk pop song about homosexuality called "The Rainbow", with this song appearing in the "Chef Aid" episode and in a soundtrack album based on that episode, titled Chef Aid: The South Park Album. The version on Chef Aid: The South Park Album has guest vocals from Isaac Hayes, who voiced Chef on South Park. Ween continued to tour throughout 1998 and 1999, before releasing their next album White Pepper in May 2000, which was their last for Elektra/Warner Music. In August 2022, Ween performed "Buckingham Green" and the title track at the 25th anniversary concert for South Park.

== Reception ==
Professional ratings
Review scores
Source	Rating
AllMusic	4.5/5 stars
Entertainment Weekly	C
NME	2/10
OndaRock	8.5/10
Rolling Stone	3.5/5 stars
Pitchfork	9.7/10
The Rolling Stone Album Guide	4/5 stars

Sara Scribner of Los Angeles Times described The Mollusk as a "poppier, less fractured album" in 1997. Rob Brunner of Entertainment Weekly gave it a C. He considered it a return to the band's previous sound, and critiqued its "juvenility". He said, "After a strange detour with the flippant 12 Golden Country Greats, this alt-rock comedy act returns to past albums’ suburban-stoners-with-a-tape-deck silliness with The Mollusk." J.W Lim of the Associated Press wrote that "Ween gets back to genre hopping with The Mollusk". He considered "Ocean Man" to be the strongest track on the album, and described "Pink Eye (On My Leg)" as being a song that "could be the theme for a sitcom about an intergalatic salvage operator and his space dog sparky." Rolling Stone's Neva Chonin called "Mutilated Lips" the funniest track on the album, and said "Ween may be weird, but they're rarely weird in the same way twice", adding that "there's likely a wonderfully wack techno album on the horizon." Lynn Gellar of Bomb magazine wrote that Ween were equivalent to meeting a man at a party who was "willing to do anything for a laugh." She added that, "the fact that they’re great musicians capable of jumping genres every album is just icing on a sardonic cake." In September 1997, Lisa Harwin of The Michigan Daily labelled it "another collection of weirdness".

CMJ referred to the album as "twisted parody pop", writing, "The Mollusk finds the Ween 'brothers' returning from the Nashville stylings of 12 Golden Country Greats to the safety and comfort of their own living room, bedroom, basement, or wherever it is they record, for another artful and offensive hit-and-run job on an array of genres".

=== Legacy and impact ===
In January 1998, "Waving My Dick in the Wind" was included on the 1997 edition of Triple J's Hottest 100 list, an annual list of the most popular songs in Australia. Consequence of Sound included the album on their list of the 50 best albums from 1997. Newsweek named The Mollusk as the 14th best album of 1997 in 2017. In 2007, Impose magazine included it on an album list titled "29 Reasons 1997 Shits All Over 2007". Stereogum ranked it as the third best Ween album in November 2012, behind only White Pepper and Quebec.

The Mollusk was a direct influence on the animated television series SpongeBob SquarePants. Stephen Hillenburg, the show's creator, contacted the band shortly after the album's release, and he requested a song from them which later became "Loop de Loop". The track "Ocean Man" is played during the end credits of The SpongeBob SquarePants Movie.

Kurt Vile named "Mutilated Lips" his favorite song of all time, and recalled that the album "blew [his] mind" when he listened to it as a teenager.

== Track listing ==
The Mollusk track listing
No.	Title	Writer(s)	Singer	Length
1.	"I'm Dancing in the Show Tonight"	Ween, John Rox	Freeman, Melchiondo	1:56
2.	"The Mollusk"	Ween	Freeman	2:37
3.	"Polka Dot Tail"	Ween	Freeman	3:20
4.	"I'll Be Your Jonny on the Spot"	Ween	Melchiondo	2:01
5.	"Mutilated Lips"	Ween	Freeman	3:49
6.	"The Blarney Stone"	Ween	Melchiondo	3:14
7.	"It's Gonna Be (Alright)"	Ween	Freeman	3:19
8.	"The Golden Eel"	Ween	Freeman	4:04
9.	"Cold Blows the Wind"	Traditional	Freeman	4:28
10.	"Pink Eye (On My Leg)" (instrumental)	Ween		3:13
11.	"Waving My Dick in the Wind"	Ween	Freeman	2:12
12.	"Buckingham Green"	Ween	Freeman	3:19
13.	"Ocean Man"	Ween	Freeman	2:07
14.	"She Wanted to Leave (Reprise) (Note: "She Wanted to Leave" ends at 2:25; a slow instrumental reprise of "I'm Dancing in the Show Tonight" accompanied by wind noises plays after 7 seconds of silence.)"	Ween	Freeman	4:29
Total length:				43:57

== The Mollusk Sessions ==
In 2007, Ween released The Mollusk Sessions, which contains demo versions of the album's tracks as well as some cut tracks. Some of these cut tracks would end up being featured on future albums: "Flutes of The Chi" would end up on the following record White Pepper, and "Did You See Me" would later be included on the outtake compilation Shinola, Vol. 1.

The Mollusk Sessions
No.	Title	Length
1.	"Mutilated Lips"	4:03
2.	"Cold Blows the Wind"	4:21
3.	"The Mollusk"	2:50
4.	"Waving My Dick in the Wind"	2:22
5.	"Kim Smoltz"	4:45
6.	"Ocean Man"	2:21
7.	"Koko"	3:39
8.	"Did You See Me"	5:29
9.	"Flutes of the Chi"	3:13
10.	"She Wanted to Leave"	2:28
11.	"Vinnie the Eel"	5:06
Total length:		40:37

== Personnel ==
According to the album's liner notes:

Ween:

- Dean Ween
- Gene Ween
- Dave Dreiwitz
- Glenn McClelland
- Claude Coleman Jr.

Additional Musicians:

- Mean Ween
- Charlie McClelland
- Bill Fowler
- George Altonen
- Stephan Said
- Matt Kohut

Technical

- Andrew Wise – producer, engineer, mixer
- Juan Garcia – assistant engineering
- Bill McNamera – assistant engineering
- Steve Nebesney – assistant engineering
- Mick Preston – assistant engineering
- Ralph Smith – assistant engineering
- Jim Woolsey – assistant engineering
- Peter Curzon – artwork
- Tom Nichols – photography
- Rupert Truman – photography
- Sam Brooks – cover design
- Finlay Cowan – cover design
- Storm Thorgerson – cover design
- Jason Reddy – illustration

== Charts ==
Chart performance for The Mollusk
Chart (1997)	Peak position
Australian Albums (ARIA)	69
US Billboard 200	159
US Heatseekers Albums (Billboard)	5
