= Christopher B. "Stubb" Stubblefield =

American barbecue restaurateur and music patron

- Born: Christopher B. Stubblefield, Sr. March 7, 1931; Navasota, Texas, U.S.
- Died: May 27, 1995 (aged 64)
- Occupation: Restaurateur

Christopher B. "Stubb" Stubblefield, Sr. (March 7, 1931 – May 27, 1995) was an American barbecue restaurateur, music patron and a Barbecue Hall of Famer, known for his barbecue sauces, rubs and marinades distributed by Stubb's Legendary Kitchen, Inc.

== Early life and career ==
Born in Navasota, Texas, Stubblefield was one of thirteen children born to an East Texas Baptist preacher. His family moved to Lubbock, Texas, in the 1930s, where his father was a minister and sharecropper. Stubblefield was employed in his youth as a cotton picker. He later served in the United States Army during the Korean War, where after being injured, he moved to the mess hall where he prepared meals for soldiers. After he left the Army, Stubblefield moved back to Lubbock.

== Restaurateur ==
In Lubbock, Stubblefield found a mentor in barbecue restaurateur Amos Gamel. From Gamel, Stubblefield learned the art of smoking meats and complementing barbecue with sauce.

In 1968, he opened his first restaurant, Stubb's Bar-B-Q, at 108 East Broadway in Lubbock. It was located in a former motor court, with the four pairs of rooms separated by pairs of carports. Stubb lived in the room directly behind the restaurant. Eventually he created an opening between the stove and the barbecue pit and converted the room into a pool room. One evening, Paul Milosevich brought touring country star Tom T. Hall to Stubb's. A pool game between Joe Ely and Tom T Hall was played with broomsticks and an onion, which became the inspiration for Hall's song, "The Great East Broadway Onion Championship of 1978".

In the 1970s and early 1980s, Sunday night jam sessions held in his small restaurant hosted such musicians as Terry Allen, Johnny Cash, Joe Ely, Jimmie Dale Gilmore, Tom T. Hall, B.B. King, Willie Nelson, Jessie "Guitar" Taylor, George Thorogood, Stevie Ray Vaughan, and Muddy Waters, as well as such regulars as Dee Purkeypile who played the B3 and was the leader of the house band that hosted the jam sessions, Smokey Joe Miller, and others. Regardless of who was playing, Stubb would get up on stage and sing "Summertime" before the evening was done. He especially loved singing "House of the Rising Sun" during which he would announce, "Just a cook, y'all."

Stubb was a tall man with a large frame and gentle nature. He maintained an atmosphere that was loose and much like a family, that included such regulars as his cousin, one-armed war veteran Elias "Cuz" Sabders and a little person known as Little Pete. The jukebox was vintage and filled with such original classic 45s as Hound Dog and Heartbreak Hotel. During Stevie Vaughan's first Stubb's gig, he spent that Saturday hunched over the jukebox copying down lyrics. Among these was Tin Pan Alley, which he used on his first album. Upon his passing, the jukebox was given to guitarist Jesse Taylor.

Business was restricted by limited seating and its distance from the college neighborhoods that provided the bulk of its potential patrons. The Sunday night jam sessions helped keep the place in business. Eventually another club, Fat Dawg's, which was across from the northeast corner of the Texas Tech University campus, began a rival Sunday night jam, which had a serious impact on Stubb's business and contributed to its eventual failure. The construction of the Marsha Sharp Freeway saw the destruction of Fat Dawg's, to the satisfaction of many of Stubb's former patrons.

Stubb's original restaurant closed in the early 1980s. Saddened by seeing the shuttered building, he eventually hired a bulldozer and had the place demolished. He relocated to Austin and in 1984 began selling barbecue at the blues joint Antone's. He later set up his own restaurant off Interstate 35 in Austin which closed down in the late 1980s.

In 1990, Stubblefield set up Stubb's Legendary Kitchen with partners to sell barbecue sauce at grocery stores. The company survived his death in 1995 and continues to sell his Original and Spicy barbecue sauce, as well as marinades, rubs, and other barbecue sauce flavors nationwide and overseas in countries such as the U.K. and Australia. The company, now known as Stubb's Legendary Bar-B-Q was purchased by McCormick & Co. Inc. in 2015 for $100 million. In 1993, he also opened a new restaurant and music venue in Lubbock at 19th and Interstate 27.

== Death and legacy ==
Stubblefield suffered from heart issues for years, describing it as, "a tornado in my chest." He died of heart failure on May 27, 1995. In 2009, Stubblefield was inducted into the Austin Music Memorial. The new Lubbock restaurant location was closed shortly afterwards. A memorial to Stubblefield was realized in 1999 when a bronze statue by his friend Terry Allen was dedicated on the site of his first restaurant. Stubblefield is depicted holding a platter of barbecue in one hand with his other hand open welcoming patrons to his restaurant. Small plaques are set into what remains of the floor of the restaurant showing the locations of the kitchen, cash register, restrooms, etc. (Note that the plaque for the pit was mistakenly placed where the stove was. The actual location was on the east wall, allowing for a port for the smoke.)

== Stubb's on Red River Street and Waller Creek ==
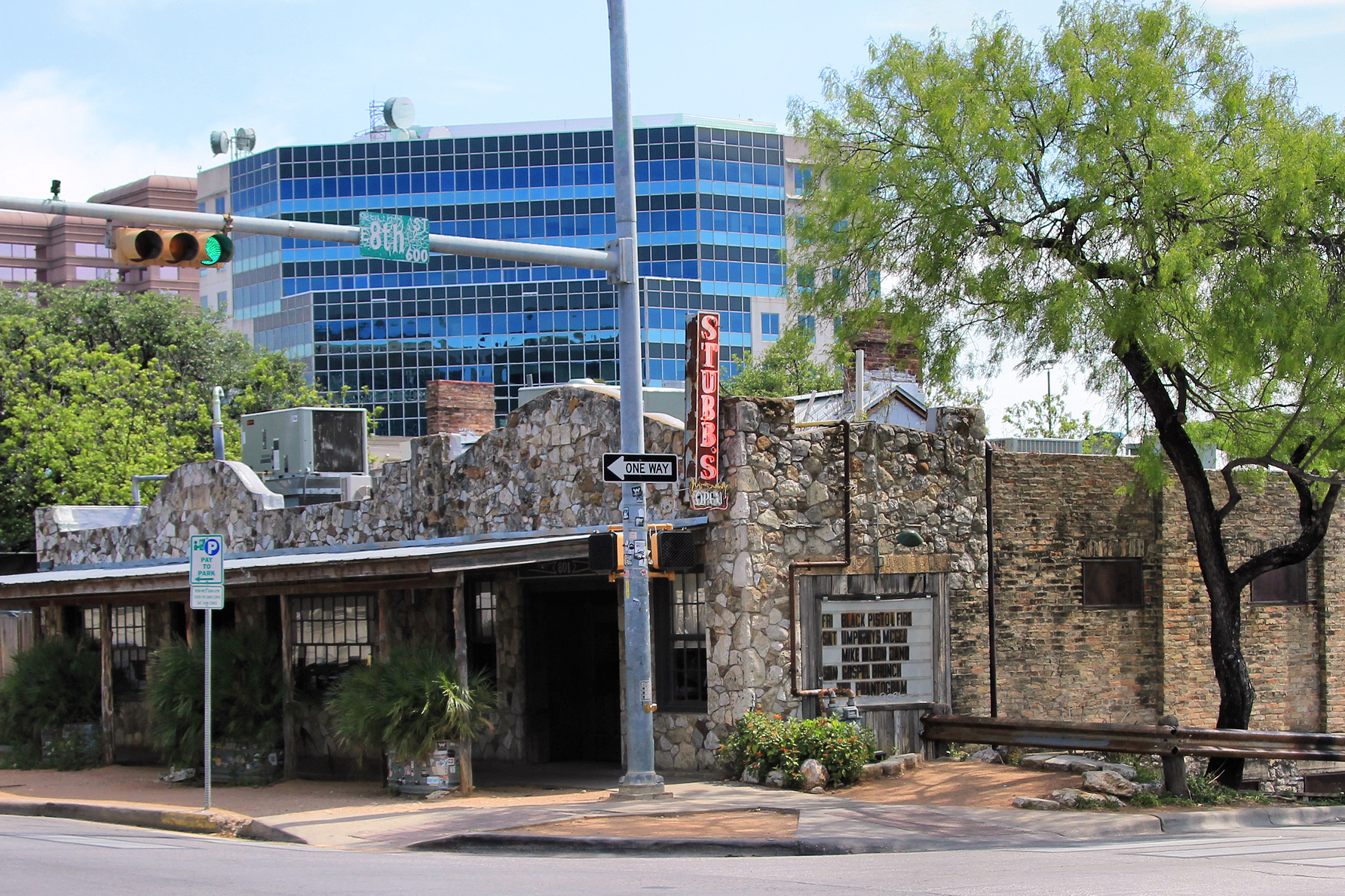
Stubb's on Red River Street in Austin

A year after his death, Stubb's restaurant reopened in a historic 19th century building at 801 Red River in Austin, Texas as a restaurant and live music venue. The BBQ opened the adjoining outdoor live-music amphitheater Stubb's Waller Creek Amphitheater at the turn of the millennium. It is named for Waller Creek.

Stubb's has hosted musicians James Brown, Bob Dylan, Snoop Dogg, Foo Fighters, Loretta Lynn, Cold War Kids, Metallica, Willie Nelson, Merle Haggard, George Jones, Blondie, Devo, G. Love & Special Sauce, The Bright Light Social Hour, R.E.M., Yeat, and Ween (Live at Stubb's) in 2003, along with many others. It hosted Austin's Spoon (band) in 2003 as part of SXSW, San Antonio's Butthole Surfers in 2008, and Houston's Blue October (Live at Stubb's) in 2007. Reggae singer Matisyahu did the album Live at Stubb's in 2005.

In 2023, the Houston psychedelic funk trio Khruangbin released the live album Live at Stubb's (with Kelly Doyle, Ruben Moreno, The Suffers and Robert Ellis).

== Trivia ==
While the Austin restaurant uses commercially available Stubb's branded sauces and marinades, the sauce used in his original restaurant was not homemade and was substantially different. As described by Stubb to jam regular Trey Yancy (who built the stage, lights, and sign) he used Hunt's original sauce, adding brine from dill pickles and jalapeños to taste.

Stubblefield was inducted into the Barbecue Hall of Fame in 2019.
