= The Deaner Album =

Studio album by The Dean Ween Group
- Released: October 21, 2016
- Recorded: 2015–2016
- Studio: Deaner's Home Studio, Trenton, New Jersey
- Genre: Alternative rock; jam band; funk; hard rock
- Length: 52:00
- Label: ATO
- Producer: Dean Ween

The Dean Ween Group chronology
The Deaner Album (2016)	Rock2 (2018)

Singles from The Deaner Album
- 1. "Exercise Man" Released: December 6, 2016

The Deaner Album Is the debut studio album by the Dean Ween Group, the group founded after Dean Ween's band Ween broke up in 2012. The album features frequent Ween collaborations, like Claude Coleman Jr., Dave Dreiwitz, Glenn McClelland, and Bill Fowler.

== History ==
In 2011, Ween played a show the Queen Elizabeth Theatre in Vancouver, Canada. During this show lead singer Gene Ween (Aaron Freeman), got so high that he kept missing notes and had a meltdown on stage which lead to the rest of the band (including Dean Ween) to walk off stage while Freeman did a couple of solo acoustic songs. After the show Freeman decided to get sober and left the band after the band's 2011 tour ended on New Year's Eve at Fillmore Auditorium in Denver, Colorado. In 2014, he released the solo album Freeman. This left the rest of the band blindsided, with Dean Ween (Micky Melchiondo) not knowing Freeman had left the band until he announced it in Rolling Stone magazine.

After the break up, the rest of the Ween line up of Dean Ween, Claude Coleman, Dave Dreiwitz, and Glenn McClelland started jamming with guitar and frequent Ween collaborator Bill Fowler, on a old unrecorded Ween song titled "Allman Sunset". This song became the album debut track "Dickie Betts". The song was named after Allman brothers guitarist Dickey Betts. The group named themselves The Dean Ween Group and played their first show at John and Peter's in New Hope, Pennsylvania, on March 19, 2014. The group late recorded new material that Melchiondo had written in his newly built home studio in Trenton, New Jersey.

== Promotion ==
Prior to the album's release, Melchiondo was on an episode of the web series Guitar Moves, where he played the song "Dickie Betts" with host Matt Sweeney. At this time, the Dean Ween Group started playing more shows and posting sound board recordings to his YouTube channel.

The only single for the album, "Exercise Man", was released in late 2016 with a music video dedicated to Monica Hampton. The video was posted on her YouTube channel, and to this day, is the only Dean Ween Group music video.

== Reception ==
The album received mixed reviews from publications like Pitchfork, who said "Dean Ween's solo debut is missing the sincerity and surrealism of Ween, but its bizarre chaos feels like you are in on a longstanding inside joke with an old friend."

== Track listing ==
All tracks are written by Dean Ween except where noted.

No.	Title	Writer(s)	Length
1.	"Dickie Betts"		3:27
2.	"Exercise Man"		1:59
3.	"Bundle of Joy"	Adam Weiner, Melchiondo	4:26
4.	"Charlie Brown"		2:24
5.	"Shwartze Pete"		1:10
6.	"I’ll Take It (And Break It)"		2:40
7.	"Garry"		4:26
8.	"You Were There"	Weiner, Melchiondo	3:29
9.	"Bums"		3:11
10.	"Gum"		4:51
11.	"Nightcrawler"	Melchiondo, TJ Tindall	4:20
12.	"Mercedes Benz"		7:04
13.	"Tammy"		4:50
14.	"Doo Doo Chasers"	Garry Shider, George Clinton	4:42
Total length:			52:21

== Personnel ==
Adapted from The Deaner Album liner notes.

Dean Ween Group

- Dean Ween - vocals (tracks 2, 3, 6, 8-10, 12, 13), guitar (all tracks), bass guitar (tracks 1, 4-7, 9-11), drums (tracks 3-7), keyboards (tracks 5-7), backing vocals (track 11)
- Claude Coleman Jr. - drums (track 14)
- Dave Dreiwitz - bass guitar (tracks 2, 3, 12, 14)
- Glenn McClelland - piano (track 1), keyboards (tracks 12, 14)
- Bill Fowler - guitar (tracks 2, 4, 12, 14)

Additional musicians

- Chuck Treece - drums (track 1, 9)
- Joe Kramer - guitar (track 1, 3)
- Curt Kirtwood - guitar, vocals (track 2)
- Michael Jude - bass, vocals (track 8)
- John Michel - drums, vocals (track 8)
- Jono Manson - guitar, vocals (track 8)
- Scott Rednor - guitar, vocals (track 8)
- Tim Nayfield - guitar, backing vocals (track 10)
- Guy Heller - vocals (track 11)
- Ray Kubian - backing vocals (track 12), drums and vocals (track 13)
- Gabe Monago - bass guitar (track 12)
- Michael Hampton - guitar (track 12, 14)
- Ralph Liberto - horns (track 12)
- Stephen Hass - keyboards (track 12)
- Carol Brooks - vocals (track 12)
- Lucas Cheadle - bass, backing vocals (track 13)

Technical

- Dean Ween - producer, engineer
- Chris Shaw - mixing
- Tom Ruff - mastering
- Mark Adams - design, layout
