= Ocean Man =

Promotional single by Ween

from the album The Mollusk
- A-side: "Mutilated Lips"
- Released: October 6, 1997
- Recorded: 1995–1996
- Studio: The Flood Zone (Holgate, New Jersey)
- Genre: Alternative rock, surf rock
- Length: 2:07
- Label: Elektra
- Songwriters: Dean Ween; Gene Ween
- Producer: Andrew Weiss

Ween singles chronology
| "Mutilated Lips" (1997) | "Ocean Man" (1997) | "Even If You Don't" (2000) |

"Ocean Man" is a song by the American alternative rock band Ween, the thirteenth track on their sixth studio album, The Mollusk (1997). It was released as a promotional CD single through Elektra Records in 1997, and also released as the B-side to the earlier single "Mutilated Lips" on June 24, 1997.

"Ocean Man" is one of Ween's best-known songs, and has appeared on various film soundtracks and commercials since its release, most notably in the closing credits of Nickelodeon's animated film The SpongeBob SquarePants Movie in 2004. The song has been performed live at several occasions, most notably Live in Chicago and Live at Stubb's.

== Composition ==
"Ocean Man" was written in the mid-'90s and recorded at a beach house on the Jersey Shore during the off-season, which Gene and Dean Ween had rented for the recording sessions of The Mollusk. The first song recorded for the album was "Cold Blows the Wind", whose theme influenced the initial two weeks of recording. "The Mollusk," "Mutilated Lips," "The Golden Eel," "She Wanted to Leave," and "Ocean Man," were all recorded during these first two weeks. "Aaron [Gene Ween] had a mandolin, he was always playing it," Dean Ween wrote in a retrospective of the album in 2017, "and we discounted it. [...] when we wrote the lyrics, it was just magic, man. Everything just fell into place."

"Ocean Man" is composed in the key of E major. However, when played live the song is transposed to the key of G major, probably so that Gene Ween can play the song with only open chords on the mandolin and is set in the time signature of common time with a tempo of 123 beats per minute.

== Track listing ==
- Elektra — PRCD-9858-2 — Promotional CD single

| No. | Title | Length |
|---|---|---|
| 1. | "Ocean Man" | 2:07 |

== Reception ==
AllMusic referred to this song as an example of how Ween's "array of silly jokes and musical parody is richer and more diverse than most of its alternative rock contemporaries".

== In popular culture ==
"Ocean Man" was most famously used as the end credits song for The SpongeBob SquarePants Movie (2004), as well as a commercial in 2003 for the Honda Civic coupe. In late 2015 and early 2016, "Ocean Man" became an Internet meme, with numerous edits depicting the song fitting over the closing credits of various films, TV shows, and video games. During this time, the song began appearing in remix videos on video sharing platforms such as YouTube and Vine. Becoming a meme also helped the band gain more listeners, with "Ocean Man" being their most listened to song on Spotify and Apple Music.
