= La Cucaracha (album) =

Studio album by Ween
- Released: October 23, 2007
- Recorded: March–April 2007
- Genres: Alternative rock, experimental rock
- Length: 49:25 (Regular version); 52:01 (iTunes version)
- Labels: Rounder, Chocodog
- Producer: Andrew Weiss

Ween chronology
The Friends EP (2007)	La Cucaracha (2007)	At the Cat's Cradle, 1992 (2008)

Singles from La Cucaracha
- 1. "Your Party" Released: 2007; 2. "Learnin' To Love" Released: 2007

Professional ratings
Aggregate scores
Source	Rating
Metacritic	73/100
Review scores
Source	Rating
AllMusic	4/5 stars
The Austin Chronicle	3/5 stars
The A.V. Club	A−
Blender	3.5/5 stars
Drowned in Sound	4/10
NME	5/10
Pitchfork	6.2/10
The Skinny	3/5 stars
Time Off	5/5 stars
Uncut	3/5 stars

La Cucaracha is the ninth and final studio album by the American alternative rock band Ween. The album was available for streaming on the band's Myspace page from October 16 to 19, 2007, and it was released on October 23. It was named the 2007 Album of the Year by Magnet magazine. A bonus track, "Bag of Fat", was available as an iTunes exclusive with the purchase of the entire album.

== Track listing ==
All tracks written by Gene Ween and Dean Ween.

La Cucaracha
No.	Title	Length
1.	"Fiesta"	2:13
2.	"Blue Balloon"	3:51
3.	"Friends"	4:06
4.	"Object"	2:36
5.	"Learnin' to Love"	2:24
6.	"My Own Bare Hands"	2:45
7.	"The Fruit Man"	4:00
8.	"Spirit Walker"	3:21
9.	"Shamemaker"	2:38
10.	"Sweetheart in the Summer"	3:15
11.	"Lullaby"	3:20
12.	"Woman and Man"	10:48
13.	"Your Party"	4:08
Total length:		49:25

iTunes Exclusive Track
No.	Title	Length
14.	"Bag of Fat"	2:36
Total length:		52:01

== Personnel ==
Ween

- Dean Ween – lead guitar, lead vocals on track 6 & 10, backing vocals
- Gene Ween – lead vocals, rhythm guitar
- Dave Dreiwitz – bass, backing vocals
- Glenn McClelland – synthesizers, backing vocals
- Claude Coleman Jr. – drums, percussion, backing vocals

Additional musicians

- David Sanborn - saxophone on "Your Party"
- Gloria Galante - harp on "Lullaby"
- Chuggy Carter - percussion on "Woman and Man"
- Debbie Richard - flute on "Woman and Man'
- Bunny Sigler - backing vocals on "Sweetheart in the Summer"
- Larry Gold - strings orchestrator on "Sweetheart in the Summer"
- Emma Kummrow - strings on "Sweetheart in the Summer"
- Olga Konopelsky - strings on "Sweetheart in the Summer"
- Igor Szwec - strings on "Sweetheart in the Summer"

Production

- Andrew Weiss – production, engineering, mixing
- Dean Ween – assistant engineer
- Gabe Monago – quality control
- Howie Weinberg – mastering
- Aaron Tanner – art direction, design

== Charts ==
Chart performance for La Cucaracha
Chart (2007)	Peak position
Australian Albums (ARIA)	84
US Billboard 200	69
