= Andrew Weiss =

Andrew Weiss may refer to:

- Andrew Weiss (economist) (born 1947), American economist and investor
- Andrew Weiss (musician) (fl. 1982), American bass guitarist and producer
