= White Pepper =

Studio album by Ween
- Released: May 2, 2000
- Recorded: 1999–2000
- Genres: Alternative rock; psychedelic pop
- Length: 39:35
- Label: Elektra
- Producers: Christopher Shaw; Ween

Ween chronology
Paintin' the Town Brown: Ween Live 1990–1998 (1999)	White Pepper (2000)	Live in Toronto Canada (2001)

Singles from White Pepper
- 1. "Even If You Don't" Released: 2000; 2. "Stay Forever" Released: 2000

Professional ratings
Aggregate scores
Source	Rating
Metacritic	66/100
Review scores
Source	Rating
AllMusic	4/5 stars
Chicago Sun-Times	3/4 stars
Entertainment Weekly	B
The Guardian	4/5 stars
Melody Maker	3.5/5 stars
NME	5/10
Pitchfork	8.0/10
Rolling Stone	3/5 stars
The Rolling Stone Album Guide	3.5/5 stars
Uncut	4/5 stars

White Pepper is the seventh studio album by the American rock band Ween, and the last album they released on Elektra Records. It was released on May 2, 2000.

== Musical style ==
The album incorporates elements of genres such as acoustic pop, Caribbean music, country, electronica, grunge, jazz, progressive rock, psychedelia, soft rock, speed metal, stoner rock and Britpop. "Bananas and Blow" has elements of Caribbean/calypso music and is lyrically about a drug mule. "Stroker Ace" is a speed metal track, and one of the band's heaviest songs, while "The Grobe" has been called a grunge/stoner rock-style song. Among the other songs on the album, "Pandy Fackler" is a jazz-influenced track, the instrumental "Ice Castles" draws from electronica, "Falling Out" has elements of country music and the single "Stay Forever" is an acoustic pop number. AllMusic describe the lead single "Even If You Don't" as being a Britpop-styled track, and "Back to Basom" as a "psych-prog-tinged soft-rock epic".

"Stay Forever" was written for cellist Tanya Haden.

== Promotion and commercial performance ==
The band helped promote the album by performing "Exactly Where I'm At" on the Late Show with David Letterman. The track "Even If You Don't" was made into a music video and directed by Trey Parker and Matt Stone of South Park fame. According to Dean Ween (Mickey Melchiondo), he and Gene Ween (Aaron Freeman) are good friends of Parker and Stone, and Freeman has referred to them as "kindred spirits".

In November 2002, two and a half years after the album was released, Billboard magazine reported that White Pepper had sold 72,000 copies in the US alone.

=== Singles ===
- "Even If You Don't" was released as a single on Mushroom Records with the B-side "Cornbread Red".
- "Stay Forever" was released as a single on Mushroom Records with "The Grobe" and "Who Dat?". "Who Dat?" was also included in the Japanese version of the album.

== Legacy ==
White Pepper was included on Creative Loafing's list of the 101 best albums of the 2000s, while Glide magazine named it the 12th best album of the decade. Magnet included it at No. 15 on their list of the 60 best albums released between 1993 and 2003. Jake Shears of Scissor Sisters named it one of his favorite albums of all time, stating: "I love the stew of what they do – they can be whimsical, they can be heavy – they're just incredible musicians and songwriters. To me, White Pepper is an amazing snapshot and a great collection of songs. They're kind of like Beck – they've always delivered – and also some of it is just so fucking juvenile."

In 2020, Stereogum's Nate Rogers wrote a piece on the album for its 20th anniversary. He attributed the initial mediocre reception of the album to its lack of profanity and increased accessibility, suggesting that it may have alienated much of the band's hardcore fans. "It's much easier to appreciate White Pepper now that we know it did not lead to a final form in which Ween were just edge-less and overglossed" he wrote, "The band never gave in to the powers that be. They never stopped being artists who deferred to the playful will of their mighty Demon God Boognish while also writing frequently — if not perpetually — fantastic music."

== Track listing ==
All songs written by Ween. Published by Warner-Tamerlane Publishing Corp./Ver Music/Browndog Music, BMI.

No.	Title	Lead Vocals	Length
1.	"Exactly Where I'm At"	Freeman	4:31
2.	"Flutes of Chi"	Freeman	3:30
3.	"Even If You Don't"	Freeman	3:25
4.	"Bananas and Blow"	Freeman	3:34
5.	"Stroker Ace"	Freeman, Melchiondo	2:08
6.	"Ice Castles" (instrumental)		2:05
7.	"Back to Basom"	Freeman	3:46
8.	"The Grobe"	Freeman	3:32
9.	"Pandy Fackler"	Melchiondo	3:57
10.	"Stay Forever"	Freeman	3:32
11.	"Falling Out"	Freeman, Melchiondo	2:28
12.	"She's Your Baby"	Freeman	3:00
Total length:			39:35

Japan bonus track
No.	Title	Lead Vocals	Length
13.	"Who Dat?"	Freeman	2:21
Total length:			41:56

== Personnel ==
According to the album's liner notes:

Ween

- Dean Ween
- Gene Ween
- Dave Dreiwitz
- Glenn McClelland
- Claude Coleman Jr.

Additional musicians

- Stu Basore
- Jane Scarpantoni
- Russel Simins
- Vaneese Thomas
- Angela Clemons
- Mark McDonald
- Greg Frey
- Pat Frey – arrangements on "She's Your Baby"

Technical

- Chris Shaw – producer, engineer, mixer
- Danny Madorsky – assistant engineer
- Phil Painson – assistant engineer
- Damian Shannon – assistant engineer
- Kirk Miller – live sound engineer
- Ween – producer
- Howie Weinberg – mastering
- Jon Weiss – cover art illustration
- Gregory Burke – art direction
- Danny Clinch – photography

== Charts ==
Chart (2000)	Peak position
Australian Albums (ARIA)	165
German Albums (Offizielle Top 100)	83
US Billboard 200	121
US Heatseekers Albums (Billboard)	2
Chart (2026)	Peak position
Scottish Albums (Official Charts)	81
