= Voodoo Lady =

1995 EP by Ween

Single by Ween

from the album Chocolate and Cheese
- Released: 1994
- Genre: Alternative rock
- Length: 3:49
- Label: Elektra
- Songwriters: Dean Ween; Gene Ween
- Producer: Andrew Weiss

Ween singles chronology
"Freedom of 76" (1994)	"Voodoo Lady" (1994)	"Piss Up a Rope" (1996)

Professional ratings
Review scores
Source	Rating
AllMusic	3/5 stars

Voodoo Lady is a song by American rock band Ween. It was released as the third and final Single off their fourth studio album, Chocolate and Cheese, released in 1994.

It is also one of two Ween songs—the other being "Push th' Little Daisies"—to chart on the US Billboard Modern Rock Tracks chart, peaking at number 32.

== Song information ==
The title track is in typical Bayou-style blues format. Chants of "Boogie boogie boogie boogie" are pervasive throughout the song. Most of the lyrics describe a woman who supposedly is always "doing that stuff that you do", and "messing me up with your voodoo". The singer seems to be someone somehow romantically involved with the Voodoo Lady. The song slowly winds down at the end, with a final blast of sound finishing the song.

== Extended Play ==
Voodoo Lady

EP by Ween
- Released: January 16, 1995
- Labels: Elektra; Flying Nun
- Producer: Andrew Weiss

Ween EP chronology
Freedom of '76 (1994)	Voodoo Lady (1995)	Piss Up a Rope/You Were the Fool (1996)

An EP version of Voodoo Lady was released in the United Kingdom by Flying Nun Records in January 1995. The cover art was designed by Gene Ween.

== Track listing ==
CD

1. "Voodoo Lady"
2. "Buenos Tardes Amigo"
3. "There's a Pig"
4. "Vallejo"

== Charts ==
Chart (1994–1995)	Peak position
Australia (ARIA)	58
UK Singles (Official Charts)	97
US Modern Rock Tracks (Billboard)	32
