= Jim Cotter (artist) =

American sculptor

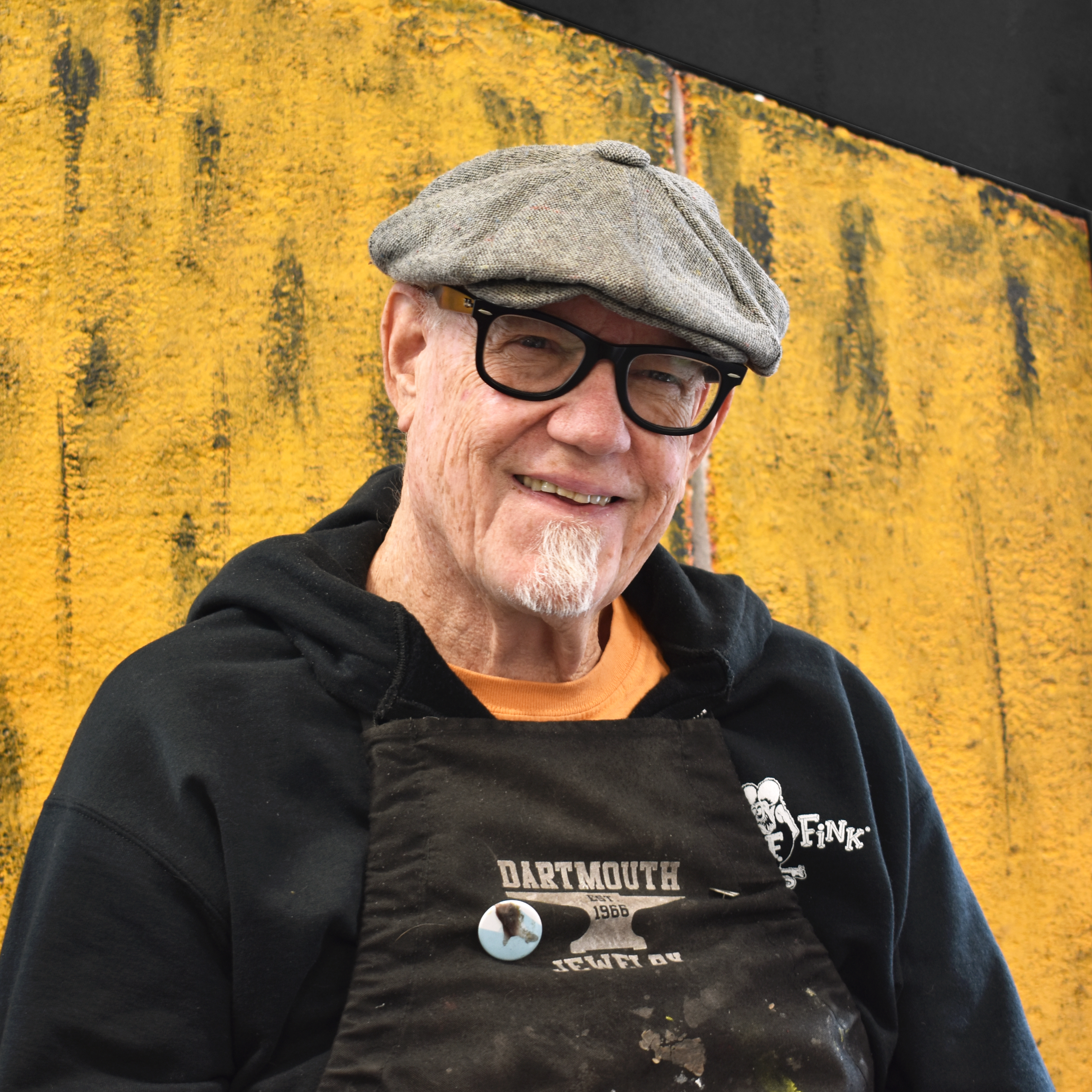
- Born: March 13, 1944 (age 82); Corning, Iowa
- Education: University of Wyoming
- Website: www.jcottergallery.com

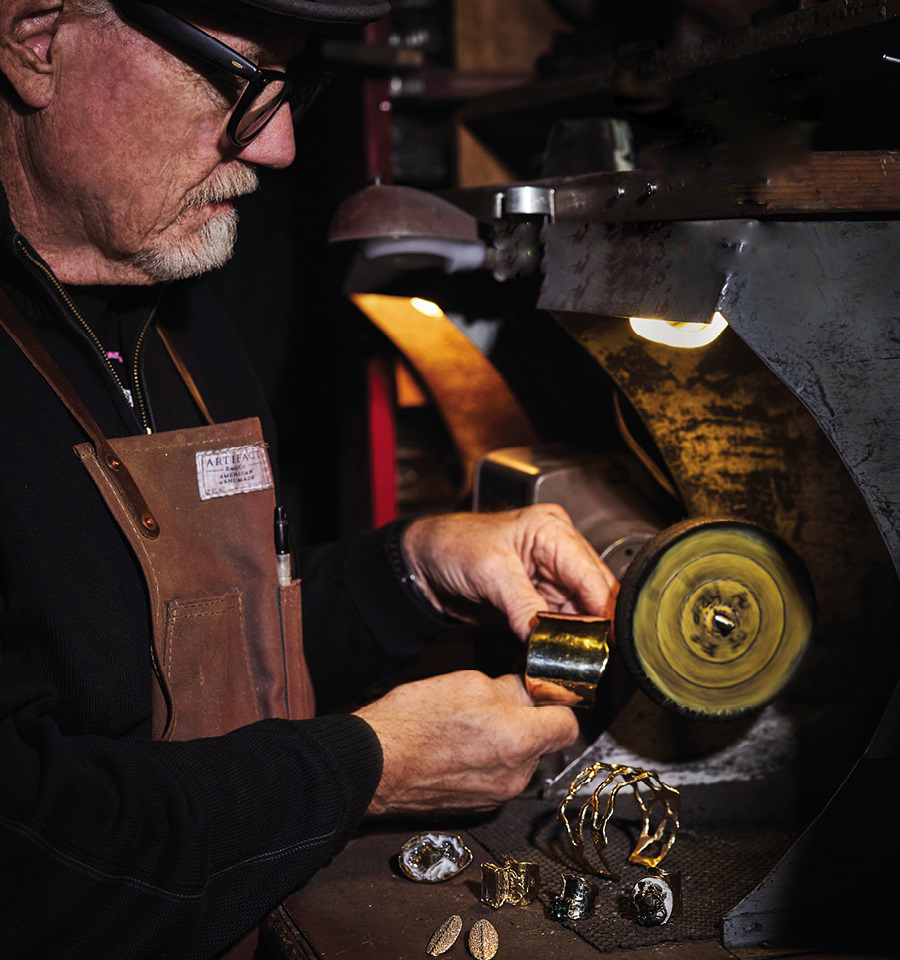
Photo: Brent Bingham for Vail Valley Magazine

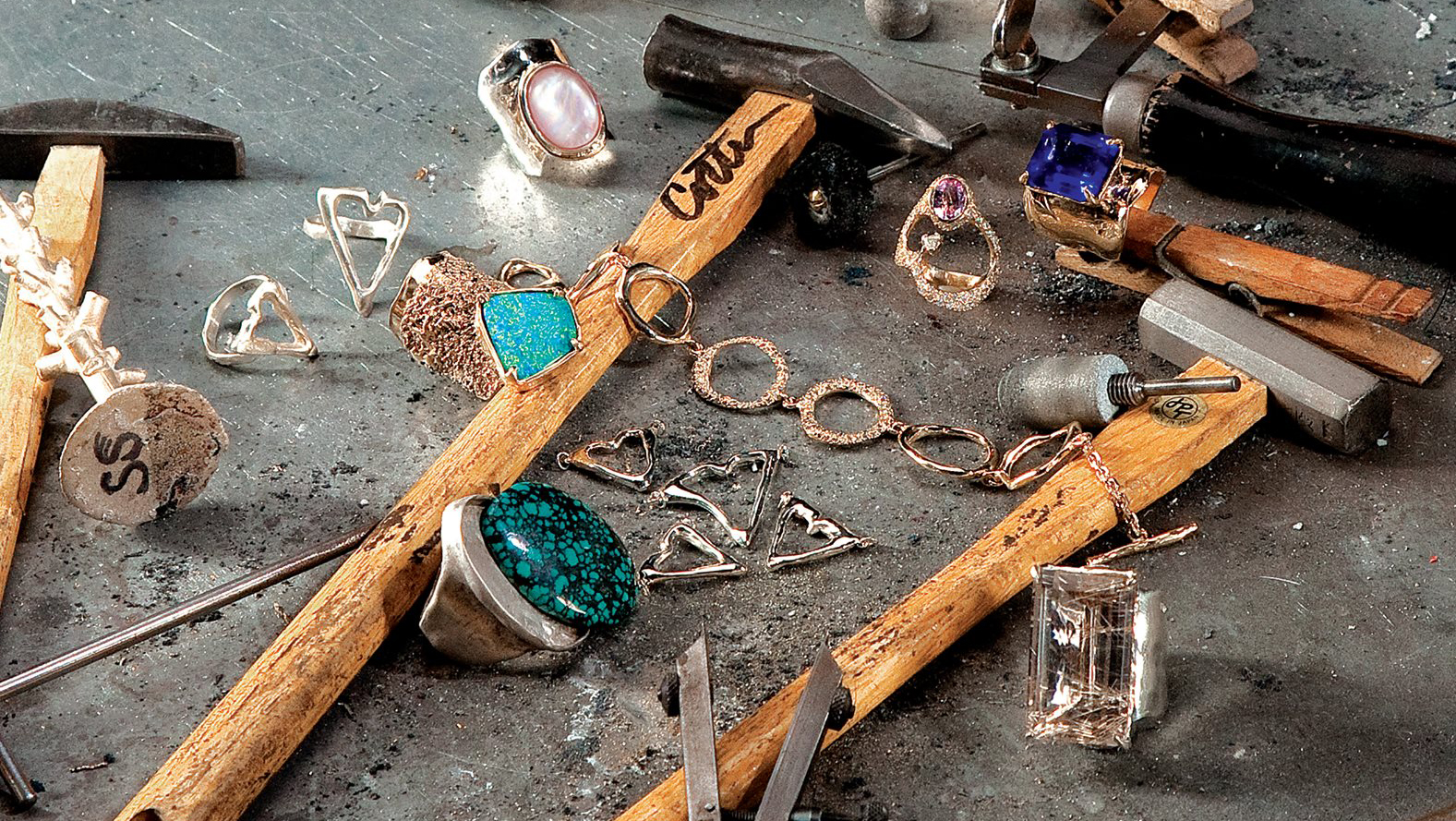
Cotter's work, jewelry

Jim Cotter (born March 13, 1944) is an American jewelry designer, jewelry artist and sculpture artist known for his use of organic forms and materials not typically used in jewelry. Cotter is the proprietor of the J. Cotter Gallery in Vail, Colorado since 1970.

Cotter's work is currently held in the collections of the Racine Art Museum and was displayed as part of their "Precious Metals: Shining Examples from RAM’s Collection" exhibition in 2016. His work has also been displayed at the National Craft Gallery in Ireland and the Taboo Gallery in San Diego, California.

In 2017 Cotter and his gallery placed as one of the "Best of Vail" by readers of the Vail Daily.

Cotter uses materials around him. A lot of his work has to do with texture, and making things look bigger than they are, or making things that should be maybe smaller or bigger.
