= Piss Up a Rope =

Single by Ween

from the album 12 Golden Country Greats
- B-side: "Sweet Texas Fire"
- Released: 1996
- Genre: Alternative country, country rock, comedy
- Length: 3:34
- Label: Elektra
- Songwriters: Gene Ween, Dean Ween
- Producer: Ben Vaughn

"Piss Up a Rope" is a song by the American rock band Ween, released in 1996 on their album 12 Golden Country Greats. It was released on 7" yellow vinyl single on Diesel Only Records.

== History ==
When asked about the lyrics "You can wash my balls with a warm wet rag" and "On your knees, you big bootied bitch," Dean Ween stated that he wrote the song for his wife. The inspiration for the title came from his father: "[It is] a funny expression that I copped from my dad. When I was a kid, he used to say, 'Aw, go piss up a rope.' It was just nonsense. It was like, 'Aw, go shit in your hat' or whatever."

== Reception ==
AllMusic critic Stephen Thomas Erlewine considered the song to be a "truly delightful gem", and one of the best songs from the album.

== Personnel ==
Ween:

- Dean Ween - lead vocals
- Gene Ween - backing vocals

Additional Musicians:

- Pete Wade – six-sting bass guitar solo
- Russ Hicks – pedal steel
- Bobby Ogdin – piano
- Buddy Spicher – fiddle
- Charlie McCoy – bass guitar, harmonica
- Gene Chrisman – drums

== In popular culture ==
- The song is heard in the background in a scene in the cafe from a May 2008 episode of English soap opera EastEnders.
- The song can be heard in the movie U Turn when Bobby (Sean Penn) asks Darrell (Billy Bob Thornton) to replace a radiator hose.
