= Mutilated Lips =

Promotional single by Ween

from the album The Mollusk
- B-side: "Ocean Man"
- Released: June 24, 1997
- Recorded: 1995
- Genre: Neo-psychedelia; psychedelic folk; art rock; alternative rock
- Length: 3:49
- Label: Elektra
- Songwriters: Dean Ween; Gene Ween
- Producer: Andrew Weiss

Ween singles chronology
"You Were the Fool" (1996)	"Mutilated Lips" (1997)	"Ocean Man" (1997)

"Mutilated Lips" is a song by American rock band Ween. It was released as the lead single from their sixth studio album, The Mollusk (1997), on June 24, 1997.

== Composition ==
The song lyrics refer to being under the influence of psychedelic drugs. The song's inclusion of acoustic guitar, bongos, synths, and keyboards was said to give the song a "psych-folk trippiness". The lyrics also make reference to the Ethiopian emperor Haile Selassie I. Given the extremity of this lyrical non-sequitur, this reference may be an evolved distortion of the Salassia mollusk.

== In other media ==
The lyrics "Mutilated lips give a kiss on the wrist of the worm like tips of tentacles expanding" were directly referenced in the novel The Procession of Mollusks (2009) by Eric E. Olson. The girl from "Mutilated Lips" was also a character in the novel.

== Track listing ==
1. "Mutilated Lips" – 3:49
2. "Ocean Man" – 2:07
