= Even If You Don't =

2000 single by Ween

Single by Ween

from the album White Pepper
- Released: 2000
- Genre: Alternative rock, psychedelic pop
- Length: 3:25
- Label: Mushroom
- Songwriters: Gene Ween, Dean Ween
- Producers: Christopher Shaw, Ween

Ween singles chronology
"Ocean Man" (1997)	"Even If You Don't" (2000)	"Stay Forever" (2000)

"Even If You Don't" is a song by the American rock band Ween. It was released in 2000 as the lead single from the album White Pepper. It was described as "a flamboyant rocker".

The music video for "Even If You Don't" was directed by the creators of South Park, Trey Parker and Matt Stone.

The song was covered by the indie/pop-punk supergroup Two Tongues on their self-titled debut album, released in 2009.

== Formats ==
=== Enhanced CD single ===
Includes the QuickTime video of "Even If You Don't" directed by Matt Stone & Trey Parker of "South Park".

Track listing:

1. "Even If You Don't"
2. "Cornbread Red"
3. "Cornbread Red (dub mix)"

=== 7" Pepper Green Vinyl ===
Track listing:

1. "Even If You Don't"
2. "Cornbread Red"
