= 12 Golden Country Greats =

Studio album by Ween
- Released: July 16, 1996
- Recorded: November 2–8, 1995
- Studios: Bradley's Barn, Mount Juliet, Tennessee
- Genres: Country; country rock; alternative country
- Length: 33:35 (original version); 32:37 (reissued version); 1:57:46 (deluxe edition)
- Label: Elektra
- Producer: Ben Vaughn

Ween chronology
Chocolate and Cheese (1994)	12 Golden Country Greats (1996)	The Mollusk (1997)

Singles from 12 Golden Country Greats
- 1. "Piss Up a Rope" Released: 1996; 2. "You Were the Fool" Released: 1996

Singles from 12 Golden Country Greats (Deluxe Edition)
- 1. "Bad Day in Brownsville" Released: May 13, 2026; 2. "Boston Chicken" Released: June 3, 2026; 3. "So Long Jerry" Released: June 24, 2026; 4. "Help Me Scrape the Mucus off My Brain (2026 Remaster)" Released: July 15, 2026

12 Golden Country Greats is the fifth studio album by the American rock band Ween, and their third on Elektra Records. It is the only album on which the group limited themselves to a specific genre of music (in this case, country music).

== Background and recording ==
According to producer and friend of the band Ben Vaughn, Ween asked him to produce the album because he already had experience working with musicians in the Nashville country scene, having produced Arthur Alexander's album Lonely Just Like Me (1993) and co-written songs with Rodney Crowell and Gary Nicholson. The legendary Bradley's Barn was chosen as the recording studio for the album.

Some musicians, such as keyboardist Bobby Emmons (who also served as a church deacon) and Danny Davis, declined to participate in the recording due to the vulgar nature of much of the lyrics, with Emmons saying "I prefer not to work on blue material". However, Ween and Vaughn still got many highly regarded country musicians to play on the album. Later, Ween assembled some of the session musicians again into a touring band dubbed The Shit Creek Boys.

== Album title ==
Despite the album's title, it only features ten tracks. Ween claimed that the "12" represents the veteran musicians that appear on the record.

However, the band did indeed record twelve songs during the demo sessions for the album. When it came time to record the actual album, the band chose not to use the songs "I Got No Darkside" and "So Long, Jerry" but kept the album title. "So Long, Jerry", a tribute to the then recently deceased Jerry Garcia, was featured as a B-Side on the "Piss Up a Rope" single.

== Song information ==
The session musicians were responsible for almost all of the instrumentation on the album. The only instrumental parts recorded by the core members of Ween were guitar solos by Dean and Gene on "I Don't Wanna Leave You on the Farm" and "Fluffy", respectively.

Gene sings the lead vocal part on every song except "Piss Up a Rope" and "Help Me Scrape the Mucus off My Brain", which feature Dean on lead vocals. The Jordanaires, best known for having provided background vocals for Elvis Presley, appear on the tracks "I'm Holding You" and "Powder Blue".

The melody of "Japanese Cowboy" closely resembles that of "Chariots of Fire" by Vangelis. The band has played the two songs as a medley in live shows.

In the tradition of country music, during "Powder Blue", Gene introduces each member of the band, who then plays a short solo on their instrument. The track was intended to run for 4:16, the last approximately one minute of which would consist of an audio clip of Muhammad Ali from after the Rumble in the Jungle fight playing over the backing instrumental track of the song. Ali's lawyers denied Ween permission to use the audio sample, but the album had already been mixed by that point, and Elektra accidentally initially pressed the album with Ali's speech still included. Repressings contain a cropped version of the track that ends abruptly at 3:13, after the introduction: "Ladies & Gentlemen, I'd like to present Muhammad Ali" (who is no longer heard).

=== Singles ===
"Piss Up a Rope" was released as a 7-inch vinyl single on Diesel Only Records. The B-side was "Sweet Texas Fire", a non-album track recorded during the Chocolate & Cheese sessions.

"You Were the Fool" and "Piss Up a Rope" were released together as a 7-inch vinyl single on Flying Nun Records (with "You Were the Fool" on "Side A" and "Piss Up a Rope" on "Side AA"). "So Long Jerry" (a tribute to Jerry Garcia recorded during the 12 Golden Country Greats sessions, but omitted from the final album) was included with these songs on a CD single issued by Elektra.

=== Appearances in other media ===
"Piss Up a Rope" was included in the 1997 crime film U Turn, which was set in a rural area. That same year "I'm Holding You" was included in the independent drama film Dream with the Fishes. "I'm Holding You" also appeared on the soundtrack album for Dream with the Fishes, which was released in June 1997.

== Reception ==
Professional ratings
Review scores
Source	Rating
AllMusic	4/5 stars
Entertainment Weekly	C−
NME	1/10
Pitchfork	8.5/10
Rolling Stone	2/5 stars
The Rolling Stone Album Guide	3/5 stars
Spin	6/10
Sputnikmusic	4.5/5 stars

Reviews for the album were mostly positive. Stephen Thomas Erlewine of AllMusic called it "as satisfying as any of their records, and gutsier, too", despite interpreting "Mister Richard Smoker" as being homophobic, and awarded the album 4 stars out of 5. Sputnikmusic's Zachary Powell gave the album 4 1/2 stars out of 5 and claimed that "Writing songs about similar themes to what country songs have been written about but including their personal brown touch is what the band does best." Another writer for the same site, Bill Thomas, gave the album 4 stars out of 5. Ethan Smith of Entertainment Weekly, on the other hand, railed against the album, describing the songs as being "notable more for their homophobia, misogyny, and racism than for anything funny", and gave it a C−.

In a 2011 interview, producer Ben Vaughn remarked that, when the album was released, many Ween fans were confused by the radical break with the band's previous sound, comparing it to the fan reception given to Neil Young's album Trans.

== 30th Anniversary Deluxe Edition ==
On May 13, 2026, the band announced through Rhino Records that 12 Golden Country Greats would receive a remastered deluxe edition spread across 3 LPs, released in July. The first LP is the remastered original album, the second LP contains demos for most of the album (minus Japanese Cowboy) and including early versions of 3 cut tracks. The 3rd LP consists of various vault tracks that had never been given an official release before, also including the two songs ("I've Got No Darkside" and "So Long Jerry") that had been intended for the original album but were cut at the last minute, as well as a cover of the Rolling Stones song Fool to Cry.

== Track listing ==
All tracks are written by Ween.

12 Golden Country Greats
No.	Title	Lead Vocals	Length
1.	"I'm Holding You"	Freeman	4:02
2.	"Japanese Cowboy"	Freeman	3:01
3.	"Piss Up a Rope"	Melchiondo	3:33
4.	"I Don't Wanna Leave You on the Farm"	Freeman	2:44
5.	"Pretty Girl"	Freeman	2:35
6.	"Powder Blue" (3:13 on repressings of the album)	Freeman	4:16
7.	"Mister Richard Smoker"	Freeman	2:42
8.	"Help Me Scrape the Mucus off My Brain"	Melchiondo	2:45
9.	"You Were the Fool"	Freeman	4:26
10.	"Fluffy"	Freeman	3:31
Total length:			33:35

=== 30th anniversary deluxe edition bonus tracks ===
==== 12 Golden Demos ====
All tracks are written by Ween.

No.	Title	Length
1.	"I Don’t Wanna Leave You on the Farm (demo)"	2:37
2.	"Piss Up a Rope (demo)"	3:28
3.	"Mister Richard Smoker (demo)"	2:06
4.	"Help Me Scrape the Mucus off My Brain (demo)"	2:38
5.	"Pretty Girl (demo)"	2:33
6.	"Fluffy (demo)"	2:39
7.	"You Were the Fool (demo)"	2:49
8.	"Powder Blue (demo)"	2:31
9.	"I’ve Got No Darkside (demo)"	5:03
10.	"Maybelle (demo)"	4:26
11.	"I’m Holding You (demo)"	3:59
12.	"So Long Jerry (demo)"	4:55
Total length:		39:44

==== 14 Golden Outtakes and Demos ====
All tracks are written by Ween except “Fool to Cry” by the Rolling Stones.

No.	Title	Length
1.	"I've Got No Darkside"	5:16
2.	"Boston Chicken"	2:38
3.	"Bad Day in Brownsville"	1:10
4.	"Good Timing Rhyming Song"	1:28
5.	"Sweet Texas Fire"	2:31
6.	"Twinkle"	2:18
7.	"If You Can't Look Me in the Eye"	1:51
8.	"I'm Gonna Fix Your Ass"	4:54
9.	"Fool to Cry"	4:13
10.	"Spaghetti"	3:16
11.	"I'll Miss You"	2:55
12.	"Maybelle (Waste Version)"	4:28
13.	"Scum of This Town"	1:54
14.	"So Long Jerry"	5:35
Total length:		44:27

== Personnel ==
Ween

- Dean Ween – lead vocals; guitar (tracks 4, 6, 9)
- Gene Ween – lead vocals; guitar (track 10)

Additional musicians:

- The Jordanaires – backing vocals (tracks 1, 6)
  - Bill Matthews
  - Neal Matthews Jr.
  - Gordon Stoker
  - Ray Walker
- Pete Wade – dobro, guitars; 6-string bass guitar (on "Piss Up a Rope")
- Bob Wray – bass guitar
- Kip Paxton – bass guitar
- Buddy Blackman – banjo
- Russ Hicks – pedal steel
- Buddy Spicher – fiddle; mandolin (on "So Long Jerry")
- Bobby Ogdin – piano
- Hargus "Pig" Robbins – piano
- Denis Solee – clarinet (on "Mister Richard Smoker")
- Charlie McCoy – bass guitar, harmonica; arrangements; organ, percussion, vibraphone (on “So Long Jerry”); banjo, trumpet, tuba (on "Mister Richard Smoker")
- Gene Chrisman – drums (tracks 1–8, 10)
- Buddy Harman – drums (on "You Were the Fool")

Technical:

- Andrew Weiss – engineer
- Bobby Bradley – engineer
- Ben Vaughn – producer
- Chuck Dehaan – art direction

== Charts ==
Chart performance for 12 Golden Country Greats
Chart (1996)	Peak position
Australian Albums (ARIA)	72
US Heatseekers Albums (Billboard)	23

2026 chart performance for 12 Golden Country Greats
Chart (2026)	Peak position
Belgian Albums (Ultratop Flanders)	67
US Top Album Sales (Billboard)	47
