= Art Edwards =

American writer and musician

- Born: May 4, 1969 (age 57); Moline, Illinois, U.S.
- Occupations: Writer, Musician
- Years active: 1990–present
- Website: artedwards.com

Arthur Eugene "Buddy" Edwards III (born May 4, 1969) is an American writer and musician. He has written three novels and the screenplay for the movie adaptation of his first novel Stuck Outside of Phoenix. He was co-founder, co-songwriter and bass player with The Refreshments, a band that sold over 400,000 units worldwide, had a hit single "Banditos", and wrote and recorded the theme song for the Fox television series King of the Hill.

== Early life ==
Edwards was born and grew up in Moline, Illinois, where he went to public school. In 1988 he gigged in his first original band, NY Not, and formed the Varietles with high school classmate Bret Hartley in 1989.

He attended Black Hawk College in Moline in 1988 and 1989 before moving to Phoenix, Arizona, in 1990 to live with a high school friend, play original music in the Tempe scene, and complete his degree at Arizona State University. He graduated from ASU with a BA in English in 1993. He later received his MFA in writing from the University of San Francisco in 2002.

== Musician ==
The first Tempe band Edwards joined—two weeks after moving to Phoenix—was the Solemines with Jim Gerke (singer, guitarist), Tim Anthonise (guitarist, later of Gloritone) and Dan Lancelot (drummer). The Solemines played its first Tempe gig in May 1990, mere days after Art’s twenty-first birthday. The Solemines led off for Tempe favorites the Gin Blossoms many times, made a six-song demo funded by Gin Blossoms’ then manager Laura Liewen, and disbanded in 1991. A short-lived version of the Solemines, dubbed “Solemines II,” involved the same lineup minus Lancelot on drums, who was replaced by Dustin Denham, formerly of the Mortals.

In 1992, Edwards formed the Hanson Brothers with Jim Gerke and Dustin Denham. The band played gigs sporadically in 1992-1993, and Edwards utilized his time in the trio to hone his songwriting skills. He wrote “Carefree,” which would later be recorded on the Refreshments album Fizzy Fuzzy Big & Buzzy, during this time.

The Refreshments formed when, in May 1993, Denham suggested Art and he bring in Roger Clyne to sing lead. The trio played five songs at their first rehearsal, “Carefree” and four Clyne/Mortals songs including “Psychosis” and “Girly.” They added Brian Blush, formerly of August Red, later in 1993 to round out their sound, and played their first gig in January 1994 leading off for Flathead at Long Wong's. Edwards married Raquel Edwards in 1995, days before the Refreshments drove to Los Angeles to record its first album for Mercury Records. The band recorded two albums for Mercury in the mid-1990s and toured extensively in the U.S. in 1996-1997.

After The Refreshments broke up in early 1998, Edwards didn’t play music again until 2004, when he performed as a solo artist, sideman, and with Art Edwards and his Defunct Band. He released his first solo album Songs from Memory in 2008, and is currently working on his second album. He hasn’t played publicly since 2009.

== Writer ==
Edwards' first novel, Stuck Outside of Phoenix, was released in 2003, and re-released on his own imprint Defunct Press in 2008. It has been made into a feature film, which premiered May 2, 2013. The film was produced by Nico Holthaus, directed by Dean Mongan and stars Brandon Hannifin.

Ghost Notes, Edwards' second novel, was released on Defunct Press in 2008, and won the 2009 PODBRAM Award for best work of contemporary fiction.

Edwards' third novel, Badge, was named a finalist in the Pacific Northwest Writers Association's Literary Contest for 2011, was released February 4, 2014 release. Badge is published by Thirteenth Note, a joint venture of Edwards and his wife.

All of Edwards' novels are part of a series, and he intends to write ten of them, each "rooted in the West, and to be rock novels in the loose sense that the protagonists will at minimum have had their ethos formed by their early experiences with rock music and playing in bands." Edwards will dedicate 2014 to releasing and promoting Badge.

Edwards is currently finishing the screenplay version of his second novel Ghost Notes, is halfway through a memoir project, and just finished a draft of his fourth novel One Star. His shorter work has appeared in The Writer and Salon, among many others.

== Bibliography ==
- Stuck Outside of Phoenix (2003)
- Ghost Notes (2008)
- Badge (2014)

== Discography ==
- Wheelie (1994) (with The Refreshments)
- Fizzy Fuzzy Big & Buzzy (1996) (with The Refreshments)
- The Bottle & Fresh Horses (1997) (with The Refreshments)
- Songs From Memory (2008)
- Loving Every Other Minute Of It (2020)
- Branches Breaking from the Weight (2022)
- The Brightness of an Ordinary Star (2024)
- The Day Before Yesterday (2026)

== EP's ==
- Lo, Our Much Praised Yet Not Altogether Satisfactory Lady 1995 (with The Refreshments)

== Demos ==
- Seattle Demos (1994) (with The Refreshments)

== Soundtracks ==
- An American Werewolf in Paris 1997 "Psychosis" (as The Refreshments)
- King of the Hill Theme song (as The Refreshments)
