= Clif Norrell =

American record producer and musician

- Genres: Americana; rock; alternative rock; pop; folk; indie rock; hard rock
- Occupations: Recording engineer; mixer; producer; mastering engineer
- Years active: 1987–present
- Website: clifnorrell.com

Clif Norrell is an American record producer, recording engineer, music mixer, and musician. He has worked with many prominent artists including Bruce Springsteen, R.E.M., Jeff Buckley, No Doubt, Rush, Faith No More, Shania Twain, Mick Jagger, Dave Grohl, Sting, Paul McCartney, Gavin Degraw, Joss Stone, Selena Gomez and The Police.

Norrell was nominated for two Grammy Awards and two TEC Awards for his engineering work on Springsteen's 2012 album Wrecking Ball and its single "We Take Care of Our Own", as well as an additional TEC Award nomination for his work on Sting's album 57th and 9th. Norrell has been featured in many articles, books, and music conferences. Norrell also mixed the first commercial music-only release in Dolby Atmos immersive sound format for the 25th Anniversary edition of R.E.M.'s Automatic for the People album.

== Early career ==
Starting with a long background as a trained trumpet player and guitarist, Norrell began his studio career at the legendary Ocean Way Recording in Los Angeles, the world's most awarded recording studio, in the mid 1980s under the mentorship of renowned audio guru Allen Sides. Throughout his years there as staff engineer, Norrell honed his skills while working with superstars like Bruce Springsteen, Prince, Beastie Boys, Van Halen, and many others. He also learned his craft by working with such legendary producers and engineers as Arif Mardin, Glyn Johns, Andy Johns, Norman Granz, and many other top contemporary producers. Starting out in the era when analog recording technology was at its peak and digital technology was just starting to be more widely used in studios, Norrell continues to incorporate vintage analog tape recorders and processing together with the latest in digital audio advancements to achieve the sound and feel he and the artists envision for each project.

== Partial discography ==
Artist	Project	Credit	Year
R.E.M.	Automatic for the People	Engineer, mixer	1992
Bruce Springsteen	Wrecking Ball	Engineer	2012
Jeff Buckley	Grace	Engineer	1994
Ghost	Prequelle	Engineer	2018
Weezer	Pinkerton	Engineer	1996
Rush	Test For Echo	Engineer	1996
Faith No More	King for a Day... Fool for a Lifetime	Engineer	1995
Anouk	Hotel New York	Producer	2004
Shania Twain	Now	Engineer	2017
SuperHeavy	SuperHeavy	Engineer	2011
Sting	57th and 9th	Engineer	2016
Sting	At The Movies	Mixer	1999
Miley Cyrus	Breakout	Mixer	2008
Miley Cyrus	Start All Over	Mixer	2007
The Replacements	All Shook Down	Engineer, mixer	1990
Echo and The Bunnymen	Evergreen	Mixer	1997
Needtobreathe	Rivers in the Wasteland	Engineer	2014
RDGLDGRN	RDGLDGRN LP	Engineer, mixer	2013
Noisettes	What's the Time Mr. Wolf	Producer, engineer, mixer	2007
Indigo Girls	Indigo Girls	Engineer, mixer	1989
Indigo Girls	Nomads Indians Saints	Engineer, mixer	1990
Widespread Panic	Ain't Life Grand	Mixer	1994
Widespread Panic	Bombs and Butterflies	Mixer	1997
Rollins Band	Come In and Burn	Engineer, mixer	1997
Rollins Band	Get Some Go Again	Engineer, mixer	2000
Rollins Band	The Only Way to Know For Sure	Producer, engineer, mixer	2002
Rollins Band	Nice	Engineer, mixer	2001
No Doubt	"Making Out" from Rock Steady	Engineer	2001
The Refreshments	Fizzy Fuzzy Big & Buzzy	Producer, engineer, mixer	1996
Roger Clyne and the Peacemakers	No More Beautiful World	Producer, engineer, mixer	2007
Roger Clyne and the Peacemakers	Turbo Ocho	Producer, engineer, mixer	2008
Billy Idol	The Devil's Playground	Engineer	2005
Selena Gomez	Kiss & Tell	Mixer	2009
Selena Gomez	"Live Like There's No Tomorrow" from A Year Without Rain	Mixer	2010
Serena Ryder	Live	Mixer, mastering engineer	2002
Little Birdy	Hollywood	Engineer, mixer	2006
Skunk Anansie	Post Orgasmic Chill	Engineer	1999
John Hiatt	Perfectly Good Guitar	Engineer, mixer	1993
A.R. Rahman	Infinite Love	Mixer	2012
Anvil	Juggernaut of Justice	Mastering engineer	2011
The Jayhawks	Tomorrow the Green Grass	Engineer	1995
Pixies	Debaser	Mixer	1989
Gavin DeGraw	Sweeter	Engineer	2011
