= John Shadegg =

American politician (born 1949)

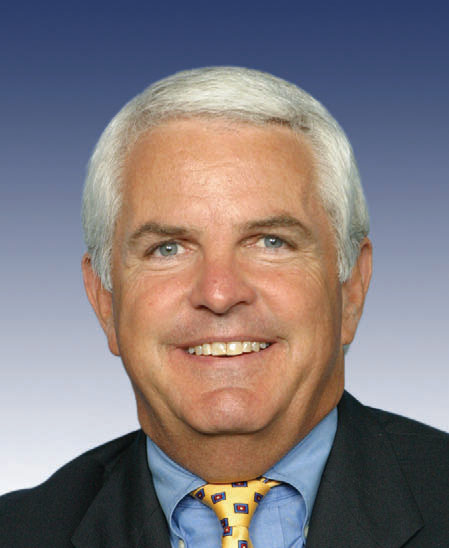

Chair of the House Republican Policy Committee
- In office January 3, 2005 – January 13, 2006
- Leader: Dennis Hastert
- Preceded by: Chris Cox
- Succeeded by: Adam Putnam

Chair of the Republican Study Committee
- In office January 3, 2001 – January 3, 2003
- Preceded by: Sam Johnson
- Succeeded by: Sue Myrick

Member of the U.S. House of Representatives from Arizona
- In office January 3, 1995 – January 3, 2011
- Preceded by: Jon Kyl
- Succeeded by: Ben Quayle
- Constituency: 4th district (1995–2003); 3rd district (2003–2011)

Personal details
- Born: John Barden Shadegg; October 22, 1949 (age 77) Phoenix, Arizona, U.S.
- Party: Republican
- Spouse: Shirley Lueck
- Relatives: Stephen Shadegg (father) Roger Clyne (nephew)
- Education: University of Arizona (BA, JD)

Military service
- Allegiance: United States
- Branch/service: United States Air Force
- Years of service: 1969–1975
- Unit: Arizona Air National Guard
- Shadegg's voice Shadegg supporting the State High Risk Pool Funding Extension Act of 2005. Recorded July 27, 2005

John Barden Shadegg (/ˈʃædɪɡ/; born October 22, 1949) is an American politician and former U.S. representative for Arizona's 3rd congressional district, serving from 1995 until 2011. He is a member of the Republican Party.

The district, numbered as the 4th district before the 2000 census, included much of northern Phoenix.

== Early life, education and career ==
Shadegg is the son of Eugenia Kerr and Stephen Shadegg. The senior Shadegg, a conservative political consultant and public relations specialist, supported Barry Goldwater's 1952, 1958, 1968, 1974, and 1980 U.S. Senate campaigns and worked with F. Clifton White and Peter O'Donnell to organize the Draft Goldwater Committee in the 1963–64 presidential campaign.

The Shadeggs are of partial Swiss descent.

John Shadegg was born in Phoenix and received a Bachelor of Arts from the University of Arizona at Tucson in 1972 and a Juris Doctor from the University of Arizona Law School, also in Tucson, in 1975. He served in the Arizona Air National Guard from 1969 to 1975.

In 1975, he went to work for the law firm of Treon, Warnicke, Dann and Roush. In 1982, Shadegg led the re-election campaign of Robert Corbin, for Arizona Attorney General. The election was challenged with claims that Corbin buried the prosecution looking into the murder of organized crime investigative reporter Don Bolles which Corbin's former employer was suspected in. Shadegg served as Special Assistant Attorney General for Corbin between 1983 and 1990. He was also Corbin's chief lobbyist, where he was the point man for the impeachment of Gov. Evan Mecham.

Shadegg served as special counsel to the Arizona state House Republican caucus in 1991 and 1992 and an adviser to the United States Sentencing Commission before entering the House.

== U.S. House of Representatives ==
=== Committee assignments ===
- Committee on Energy and Commerce
  - Subcommittee on Energy and Environment
  - Subcommittee on Communications, Technology and the Internet
  - Subcommittee on Health
- Select Committee on Energy Independence and Global Warming

=== Party leadership ===
From 2000 to 2002, Congressman Shadegg served as chairman of the Republican Study Committee (RSC), a group of conservative House Republicans.

Following the 2004 election, Shadegg was elected Chairman of the House Republican Policy Committee, the fifth-ranking position in the House Leadership. He was the only member of the Republican Class of 1994 serving in leadership until resigning the post to run for Majority Leader in January 2006.

On January 13, 2006, Shadegg officially joined the race for the House Majority Leader as a compromise alternative candidate to Representatives Roy Blunt and John Boehner. Shadegg received the support of the National Review, the Club for Growth, and the Arizona Republic. Feb. 2, after Shadegg came third in the first ballot, his supporters switched to second place Boehner, ensuring Boehner's election on the second ballot.

Shadegg ran for House Minority Whip following the loss of Republican control of the House in November 2006, losing to Blunt.

== Political positions ==
From the 104th Congress to the 111th Congress, Shadegg introduced the Enumerated Powers Act, although it has not been passed into law. At the beginning of the 105th Congress, the House of Representatives incorporated the substantive requirement of the Enumerated Powers Act into the House rules.

In 2007, he opposed several bills to set a deadline to withdraw troops from Iraq. Shadegg voted against the Fair Minimum Wage Act of 2007, which increased the federal minimum wage from $5.15 to $7.25 an hour. Shadegg voted for a bill to build a 700-mile (1,100 km) fence along the border between the United States and Mexico (Secure Fence Act of 2006). In 2005, Shadegg voted against a bill to create a flag-burning amendment to the Constitution.

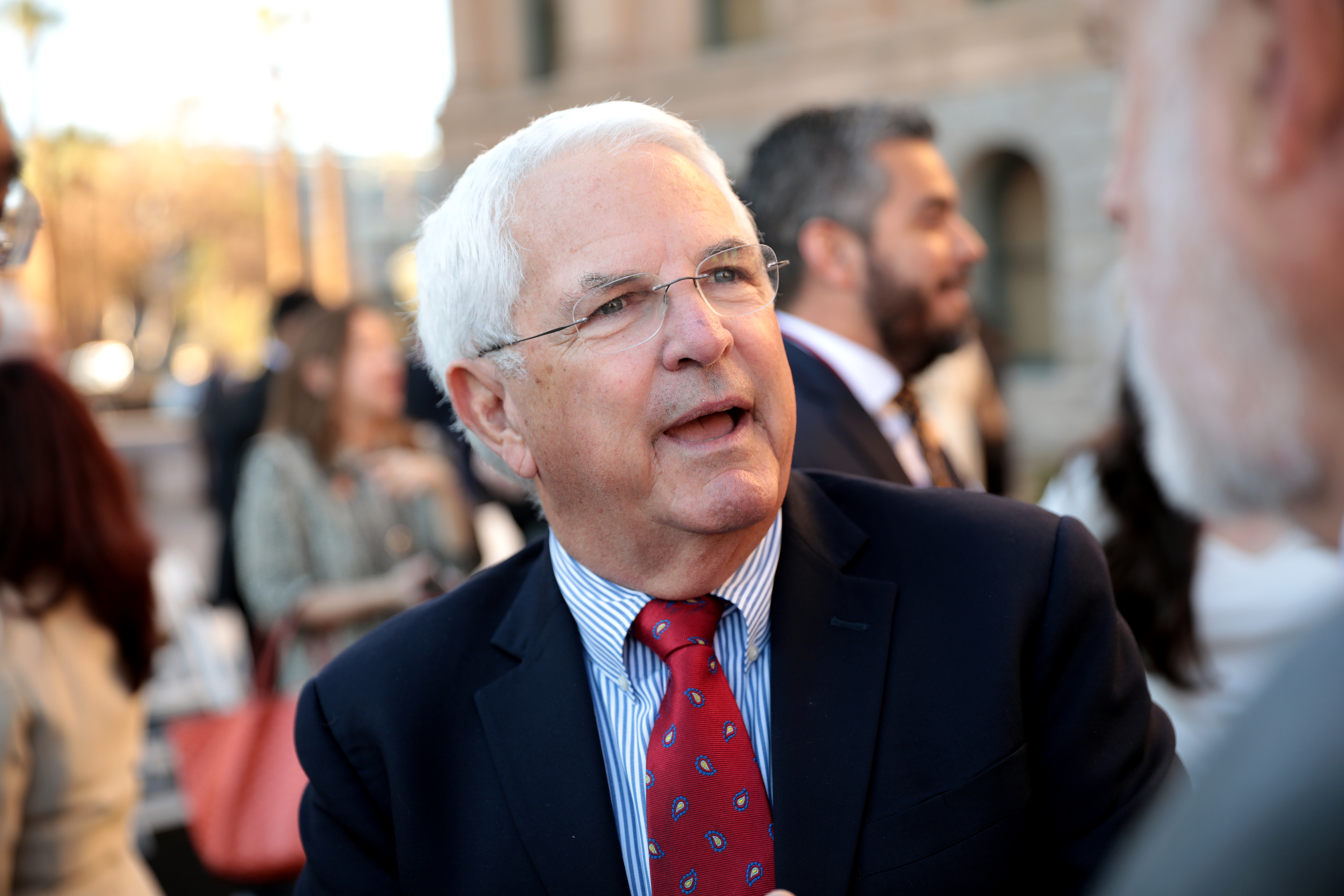
Shadegg speaking at the Arizona State Capitol building.

Shadegg is a staunch advocate of a federal prohibition of online poker. In 2006, he cosponsored H.R. 4411, the Goodlatte-Leach Internet Gambling Prohibition Act and H.R. 4777, the Internet Gambling Prohibition Act.

Shadegg is vehemently opposed to the Healthcare Reform Package that was tabled in October 2009. He said the reform package is a "Soviet-style gulag health care", and will make American healthcare something akin to that available to the prisoners of Russian gulag.

On October 14, 2009, Shadegg joined with three fellow Representatives in calling for the investigation of CAIR (the Council on American-Islamic Relations) over allegations of trying to plant "spies", based on a CAIR memo indicating that they "will develop national initiatives such as Lobby Day, and placing Muslim interns in Congressional offices." The request came in the wake of the publication of a book, Muslim Mafia, the foreword of which had been penned by Congresswoman Sue Myrick, that portrayed CAIR as a subversive organization allied with international terrorists. CAIR has countered that these initiatives are extensively used by all advocacy groups and accused Shadegg and his colleagues of intending to intimidate American Muslims who "take part in the political process and exercise their rights."

In November 2009, New York City Mayor Michael Bloomberg expressed confidence in the security of having five 9/11 suspects brought to trial in lower Manhattan, to which Shadegg gave an overheated response: "Well mayor, how are you going to feel when it is your daughter that is kidnapped at school by a terrorist?". He later apologized to the mayor and his family for "the insensitivity of my remarks."

On March 17, 2010, after criticizing the lack of a single-payer health care system or an alternative public option in health insurance reform proposals by the Obama administration, Shadegg, who has previously responded to the possibility of such a system as, "full on Russian gulag, Soviet-style gulag health care", stated in an interview, "I would support single-payer." Shadegg's spokeswoman later clarified the remark, explaining that the Congressman believes that "Forcing them [health insurance companies] to compete, even through a public option, would be better than an individual mandate which will not work."

On September 29, 2008, Shadegg voted against the Emergency Economic Stabilization Act of 2008 which created the Troubled Assets Relief Program.

Despite his support of the second economic stimulus package bill, he voted "NO" on the first Economic Package and he also was a proponent of the 2009 Tea Party protests which condemned any bailouts, and even spoke at a rally in Phoenix.

On November 30, 2010, Shadegg declared his opposition to the extension of unemployment benefits on the basis that "the unemployed will spend as little of that money as they possibly can", having commented to Mike Barnicle "Your answer is it's the spending of money that drives the economy and I don't think that's right."

== Political campaigns ==
Shadegg entered the Republican primary race for Arizona's 4th District in 1994 after four-term incumbent Jon Kyl began what turned out to be a successful run for the United States Senate. Shadegg won a four-way primary with 43 percent of the vote, and won in November. He was reelected seven times.

=== 2006 ===
In 2006, the Democratic Party nominee was Herb Paine, who barely defeated his Democratic primary opponent, to face Shadegg in his November 2006 bid for reelection. Shadegg retained his seat with nearly 60% of the vote.

=== 2008 ===
Shadegg announced on February 11, 2008, that he would not run for an eighth term, saying that he wanted to "seek a new challenge in a different venue to advance the cause of freedom." However, Shadegg retracted the statement on February 21 and announced he would seek reelection. Although it was speculated that he would run for the United States Senate in 2010 if John McCain had become president, Shadegg had expressed his intention to leave public life and return to the private sector before changing his mind.

=== 2010 retirement ===
On January 14, 2010, Shadegg announced he would not run for reelection to a ninth term. In his statement, Shadegg says he will "pursue my commitment to fight for freedom in a different venue."

Early in 2011, Shaddeg joined the Goldwater Institute in Phoenix as a senior fellow; but he is no longer formally affiliated with the group.

In 2011, Shadegg joined the law firm of Steptoe & Johnson LLP as a partner, working out of their Washington, DC, and Phoenix offices. In 2016, Shadegg joined the Polsinelli PC law firm in Phoenix as a partner.

== Electoral history ==
Arizona's 4th congressional district: Results 1994–2000
Year	Democratic	Votes	Pct	Republican	Votes	Pct	3rd Party	Party	Votes	Pct	3rd Party	Party	Votes	Pct
1994	Carol Cure	69,760	35.98%	John B. Shadegg	116,714	60.19%	Mark Yannone	Libertarian	7,428	3.83%				
1996	Maria Elena Milton	74,857	33.22%	John B. Shadegg	150,486	66.78%								
1998	Eric Ehst	49,538	31.19%	John B. Shadegg	102,722	64.68%	Ernest Hancock	Libertarian	3,805	2.40%	Doug Quelland	Independent	2,757	1.74%
2000	Ben Jankowski	71,803	32.71%	John B. Shadegg	140,396	63.96%	Ernest Hancock	Libertarian	7,298	3.33%				

Arizona's 3rd congressional district: Results 2002–2008
Year	Democratic	Votes	Pct	Republican	Votes	Pct	3rd Party	Party	Votes	Pct	3rd Party	Party	Votes	Pct
2002	Charles Hill	47,173	30.29%	John B. Shadegg	104,847	67.32%	Mark Yannone	Libertarian	3,731	2.40%				
2004	(no candidate)			John B. Shadegg	181,012	80.10%	Mark Yannone	Libertarian	44,962	19.90%				
2006	Herb Paine	72,586	38.23%	John B. Shadegg	112,519	59.27%	Mark Yannone	Libertarian	4,744	2.50%				
2008	Bob Lord	115,759	42.07%	John B. Shadegg	148,800	54.08%	Michael Shoen	Libertarian	10,602	3.85%				

== Personal life ==
Shadegg is an Episcopalian. Shadegg's sister is the mother of Roger Clyne, rhythm guitarist of The Refreshments and Roger Clyne & The Peacemakers and a composer of the theme to the show King of The Hill

U.S. House of Representatives
Preceded by Jon Kyl	Member of the U.S. House of Representatives from Arizona's 4th congressional district 1995–2003	Succeeded by Ed Pastor
Preceded by Bob Stump	Member of the U.S. House of Representatives from Arizona's 3rd congressional district 2003–2011	Succeeded by Ben Quayle
Party political offices
Preceded by Sam Johnson	Chair of the Republican Study Committee; 2001–2003	Succeeded by Sue Myrick
Preceded by Chris Cox	Chair of the House Republican Policy Committee; 2005–2006	Succeeded by Adam Putnam
U.S. order of precedence (ceremonial)
Preceded by Mickey Edwards as Former U.S. Representative	Order of precedence of the United States as Former U.S. Representative	Succeeded by Peter Kostmayer as Former U.S. Representative
