= Shadegg =

Shadegg is a surname. Notable people with the surname include:

- John Shadegg (born 1949), American politician
- Stephen Shadegg (1909–1990), American political consultant, public relations specialist, and author
