= No More Beautiful World =

Studio album by Roger Clyne and the Peacemakers
- Released: 20 March 2007
- Genre: Southern rock
- Producer: Clif Norrell

Roger Clyne and the Peacemakers chronology
Four Unlike Before (2006)	No More Beautiful World (2007)	Turbo Ocho (2008)

Professional ratings
Review scores
Source	Rating
Allmusic	link

No More Beautiful World is the fourth studio album released by Roger Clyne and the Peacemakers. It was released on 20 March 2007 and was produced by Clif Norrell, who had previously worked with Roger Clyne on the Refreshments album Fizzy Fuzzy Big & Buzzy.

== Track listing ==
1. "Hello New Day"
2. "Bottom of the Bay"
3. "Maybe We Should Fall in Love"
4. "Contraband"
5. "Goon Squad"
6. "Wake Up Call"
7. "World Ain't Gone Crazy"
8. "Lemons"
9. "Noisy Head"
10. "Ándale"
11. "Plenty"
12. "Junebug in July"
13. "Winter in Your Heart"
14. "Hourglass"

Included is the DVD The Verse And The Chorus, a fan-focused view of the making of the album that shows the personality of the band.
