= The Bottle & Fresh Horses =

Studio album by The Refreshments
- Released: September 16, 1997
- Recorded: December 1996 - May 1997
- Studios: Arlyn Studios, Austin, TX
- Genre: Heartland rock
- Length: 51:53
- Label: Mercury
- Producer: Paul Leary

The Refreshments chronology
Fizzy Fuzzy Big & Buzzy (1996)	The Bottle & Fresh Horses (1997)

Singles from The Bottle & Fresh Horses
- 1. "Good Year" Released: 1997; 2. "Wanted" Released: 1998

Professional ratings
Review scores
Source	Rating
AllMusic	4.5/5 stars

The Bottle & Fresh Horses is the second and final album by the alternative rock band the Refreshments, released in 1997.

== Production ==
The album was produced by Paul Leary. In the 2017 documentary Here's To Life (The Story of the Refreshments), it is said that the band was set to extend their tour into December 1996 and January 1997 in Australia and New Zealand due to large amounts of hype in those countries. But Mercury Records was under new management which demanded they return to the studio, so they scrapped the shows and began working at Arlyn Studios in Austin, Texas. In that same documentary it was discussed how guitarist Brian Blush's struggles with addiction was hard that one day Vocalist and Guitarist Roger Clyne came to the studio one day and saw Paul Leary with his head in his hands and when Clyne asked Leary why, he pressed the button that played the microphone feed and heard Blush violently coughing and even puking. Clyne entered the studio room and when he asked Blush about his condition Blush said "I must've ate some bad Mexican food." The album would be mixed, mastered and finished by the early summer of 1997. The band played one show at Hayden Square Amphitheatre in the bands hometown of Tempe, Arizona on May 24, 1997. This would be one of many one off show before beginning the Bottle & Fresh Horses tour in September 1997, which would be the bands last before Bassist Buddy Edwards quit and Brian Blush was fired after the final show on May 5, 1998 at Hayden Square.

== Critical reception ==
The Washington Post thought that "new songs as 'Buy American' and 'Fonder and Blonder' aren't quite so droll as the material on last year's Fizzy Fuzzy Big & Buzzy, but they do have an appealing good humor that complements their exuberant melodies." Trouser Press concluded that "'Heaven or the Highway Out of Town' and 'Good Year' are peppy little numbers, but it might as well be .38 Special playing them."

Billboard wrote that "the band's comic slant takes a back seat to its highly underrated songwriting." The San Antonio Express-News determined that "the music is carefully crafted, but it's also deadly serious—not to mention more country-and heartland-rock oriented."

AllMusic called the album "one of the best forgotten gems of its time," writing that "the group dreamed up an earnest, dustier sound, blending heartland rock & roll with elements of country and power-pop."

== Track listing ==
All songs written by Roger Clyne and Paul "P.H." Naffah except where noted:

1. "Tributary Otis" – 4:55
2. "Preacher's Daughter" – 3:22
3. "Wanted" – 3:34
4. "Sin Nombre" – 5:27
5. "Heaven or the Highway Out of Town" – 3:26 (Blush)
6. "Buy American" – 4:01
7. "Dolly" – 3:41
8. "Good Year" – 3:15 (Blush)
9. "Fonder and Blonder" – 4:07
10. "Birds Sing" – 3:18 (Edwards)
11. "Horses" – 4:19
12. "Broken Record" – 3:42
13. "Una Soda" – 4:46
