= Rowdies =

Rowdies may refer to:

- Hooligans, a term commonly applied to fans of sports teams who engage in unruly and destructive behaviour
- Tampa Bay Rowdies, a minor league association football club from the United States
- Tampa Bay Rowdies (1975–1993), a defunct association football club from the United States
- Rowdies Rugby Football Club, a rugby club in the Missouri Rugby Union founded in 1978
