= Holthaus =

Holthaus is a surname. Notable people with the surname include:

- Eric Holthaus (born 1981), American meteorologist and climate journalist
- Fabian Holthaus (born 1995), German footballer
- Michael Holthaus (born 1950), German swimmer
- Nico Holthaus (born 1971), American writer, musician, filmmaker, and professor
