= Ken Bone =

Ken Bone may refer to:

- Ken Bone (basketball) (born 1958), American basketball coach
- Ken Bone (activist) (born 1982), American citizen and Internet meme

== See also ==
- Ken Bones (born 1947), English actor
