= Banditos (song) =

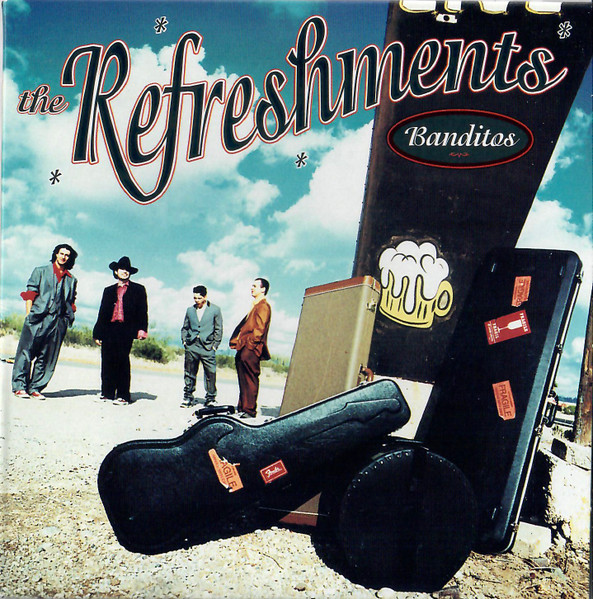

Single by The Refreshments

from the album Fizzy Fuzzy Big & Buzzy
- Released: 1995
- Genre: Pop punk, cowpunk, post-grunge
- Length: 4:17
- Label: Mercury Records
- Songwriter(s): Roger Clyne and Paul "P.H." Naffah

The Refreshments singles chronology
"Banditos" (1995)	"Down Together" (1996)

"Banditos" is a song by American band The Refreshments from their album Fizzy Fuzzy Big & Buzzy. The song is the band's best-known hit.

A music video was produced to accompany the single, in which the members of the band robbed a bank in Mexico and fled in lead singer Roger Clyne's Toyota Land Cruiser. They eventually give the police the slip through the use of a ridiculous disguise. The video was directed by David Dobkin.

== Background ==
Singer Roger Clyne said he came up with the idea for the song as a broke college student. He imagined making a run to Mexico and getting some money on the way by robbing a store like a Circle K. He wrote the song one morning over coffee with his friends laughing at him, and threw in a reference to Jean-Luc Picard because they were all Star Trek fans. "That was it. Just kind of the compassionate bandito. The guy who really wouldn't hurt a fly. You go to Mexico, you know, that's me," said Clyne.

Clyne also said the choice of whether to release "Banditos" or "Blue Collar Suicide" as the lead single from Fizzy Fuzzy Big & Buzzy came down to a coin flip upstairs in the studio.

== Charts ==
Chart (1996)	Peak position
Australia (ARIA)	56
Canadian Alternative 30	13
Canadian RPM Top Singles	20
US Billboard Modern Rock Tracks	14
