= 1001 (disambiguation) =

1001 is a year.

1001 may also refer to:

- 1001 (album), 1995, by Dead Hot Workshop
- 1001 (card game), a German point-trick card game
- 1001 (number), a natural number
- "1001", a hidden track by the Cat Empire from their 2005 album Two Shoes
- Group 1001

== See also ==
- A Thousand and One, a 2023 drama film
- One Thousand and One Nights, a collection of Middle Eastern folk tales
- One Thousand and One Nights (disambiguation)
