= Knobeloch–Seibert Farm =

- U.S. National Register of Historic Places
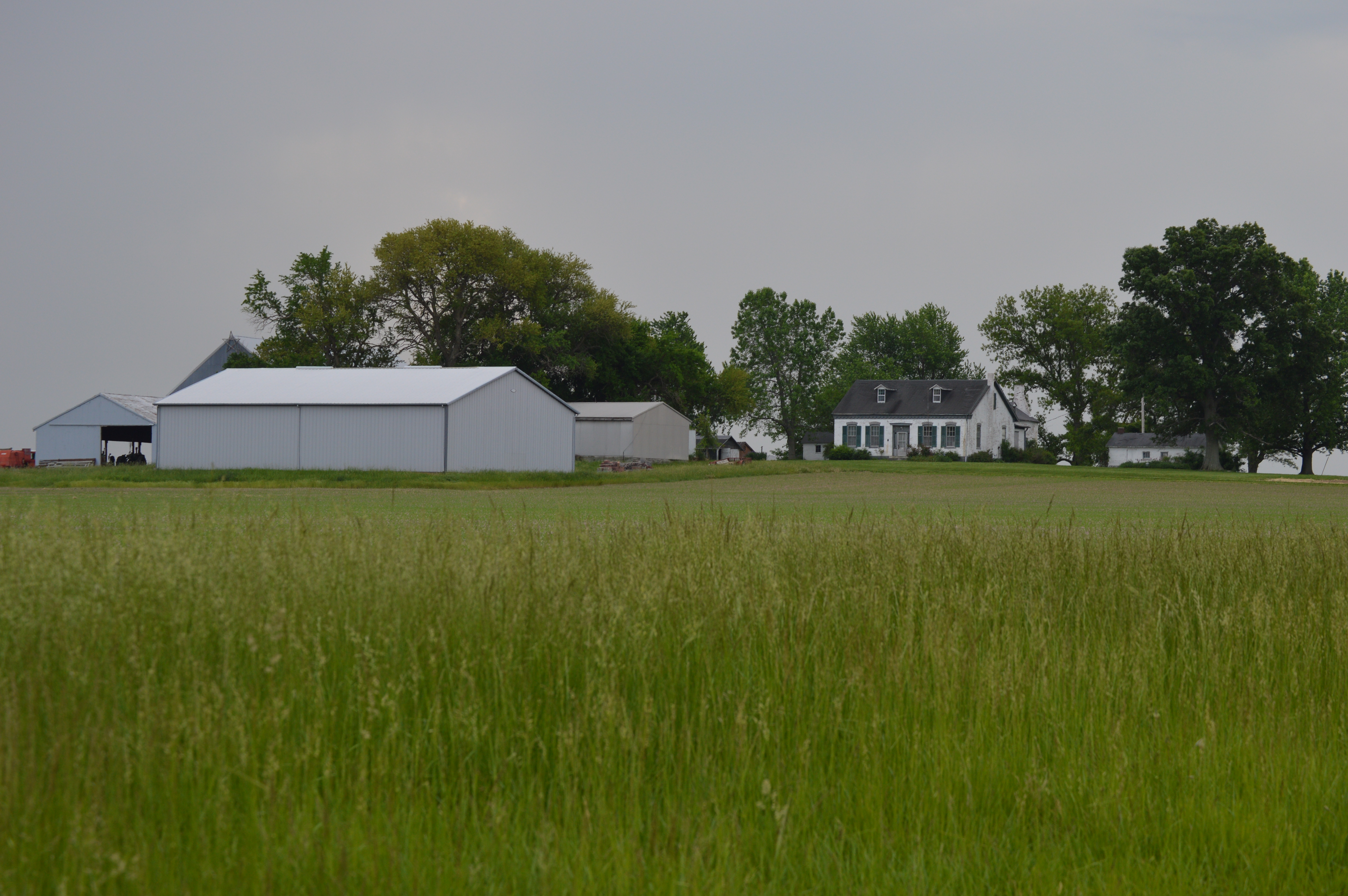
- Overview from north

- Location within Illinois
- Location: Belleville, St. Clair County, Illinois
- Coordinates: 38°31′18″N 89°59′43″W
- Area: 8 acres (3.2 ha)
- Built: c. 1832
- NRHP reference No.: 83004186
- Added to NRHP: May 9, 1983

The Knobeloch–Seibert Farm is a historic farm located on the east side of Schneider Road east of Belleville, Illinois. The farm was established c. 1832 by John W. Knobeloch and his family; after passing through several generations of the Knobeloch family, it was inherited by Henry Seibert. Both the Knobeloch and Seibert families immigrated to the area from Germany as part of a wave of German immigration to Illinois' American Bottom region in the early 1800s. The first building on the farm was a farmhouse built in 1832, which no longer stands; the oldest surviving building on the farm is the 1844 barn. The second farmhouse, constructed in 1861, features a segmented arched brick cellar, a characteristic feature of German vernacular architecture.

The farm was added to the National Register of Historic Places on May 9, 1983.
