= Steve Larson =

American musician

Steve Larson is an American musician. He was the lead guitarist for Dead Hot Workshop for a decade, beginning in the late 1980s, before joining Roger Clyne and the Peacemakers in the late 1990s. While with Roger Clyne and the Peacemakers, Larson also started Steve Larson Band.

According to the East Valley Tribune, Larson's musical influences include Waylon Jennings, Lynyrd Skynyrd, and AC/DC. Critic Serene Dominic of the Phoenix New Times described Larson's voice as "Steve Earle at his most world-weary and Charlie Daniels sans fiddle at his most reactionary."

Larson has opened for many artists solo and with the Steve Larson Band, including Shooter Jennings, Hank Williams III, Cross Canadian Ragweed, Reckless Kelly, Billy Joe Shaver, Dick Dale, JR Brown, Stoney LaRue, Sammy Hagar, John Fogerty, Kid Rock, and Hans Olson.
