= 1001 (album) =

Studio album by Dead Hot Workshop
- Released: 1995
- Genre: Alternative rock
- Labels: TAG Recordings; Atlantic Records
- Producer: Jim Scott

Dead Hot Workshop chronology
| White House (1994) | 1001 (1995) |

1001 is an album by the American alternative rock band Dead Hot Workshop, released in 1995. A commercial disappointment, it was the band's only album to be put out by a major label.

The band supported the album by touring with fellow Arizona bands the Gin Blossoms and the Refreshments. 1001's first single was the lead track, "A".

== Production ==
The album was produced by Jim Scott. The album cover displays a photograph of the Sun Club, a Tempe nightclub where many Arizona rock bands got started.

== Critical reception ==
Professional ratings
Review scores
| Source | Rating |
|---|---|
| AllMusic | 3/5 stars |
| Robert Christgau | (dud) |
| Houston Press | 4/5 stars |

Trouser Press thought that "Steve Larson’s guitar playing is dynamic-equal parts twang and bang-and the rhythm section of G. Brian Scott and Curtis Grippe rolls along sturdily." The Houston Press wrote that the album "sports the gritty, sandblasted edge the Blossoms lack, not to mention a blazing bounty of hooks," and called "A" "the great lost modern-rock single of 1995."

Noting the Gin Blossoms comparisons, the Wisconsin State Journal stated that Dead Hot Workshop "sounds significantly more raw and energetic." The State considered 1001 "full-on rock 'n' roll, the album R.E.M. wishes it could make." Tulsa World concluded that "1001 is the reactionary next album the Gin Blossoms would have made if Doug Hopkins hadn't killed himself ... Dead Hot's music is nothing terribly new or innovative, but it's done well."

AllMusic deemed the album "guitar-driven working-class rock & roll with a hint of country twang thrown in."

== Track listing ==
1001 track listing
| No. | Title | Length |
|---|---|---|
| 1. | "A" |
| 2. | "Lead Thoughts" |
| 3. | "River Otis" |
| 4. | "Burger Christ" |
| 5. | "Choad" |
| 6. | "117" |
| 7. | "Jesus Revisited" |
| 8. | "Slice of Life" |
| 9. | "Vinyl Advice" |
| 10. | "I Dream Of David" |
| 11. | "Mr. S.O.B." |
| 12. | "F*** No" |
| 13. | "Sex with Strangers" |
| 14. | "Bob Hill Climbin'" |
