= Belleville Historic District =

Historic district in Illinois, United States

- U.S. National Register of Historic Places
- U.S. Historic district
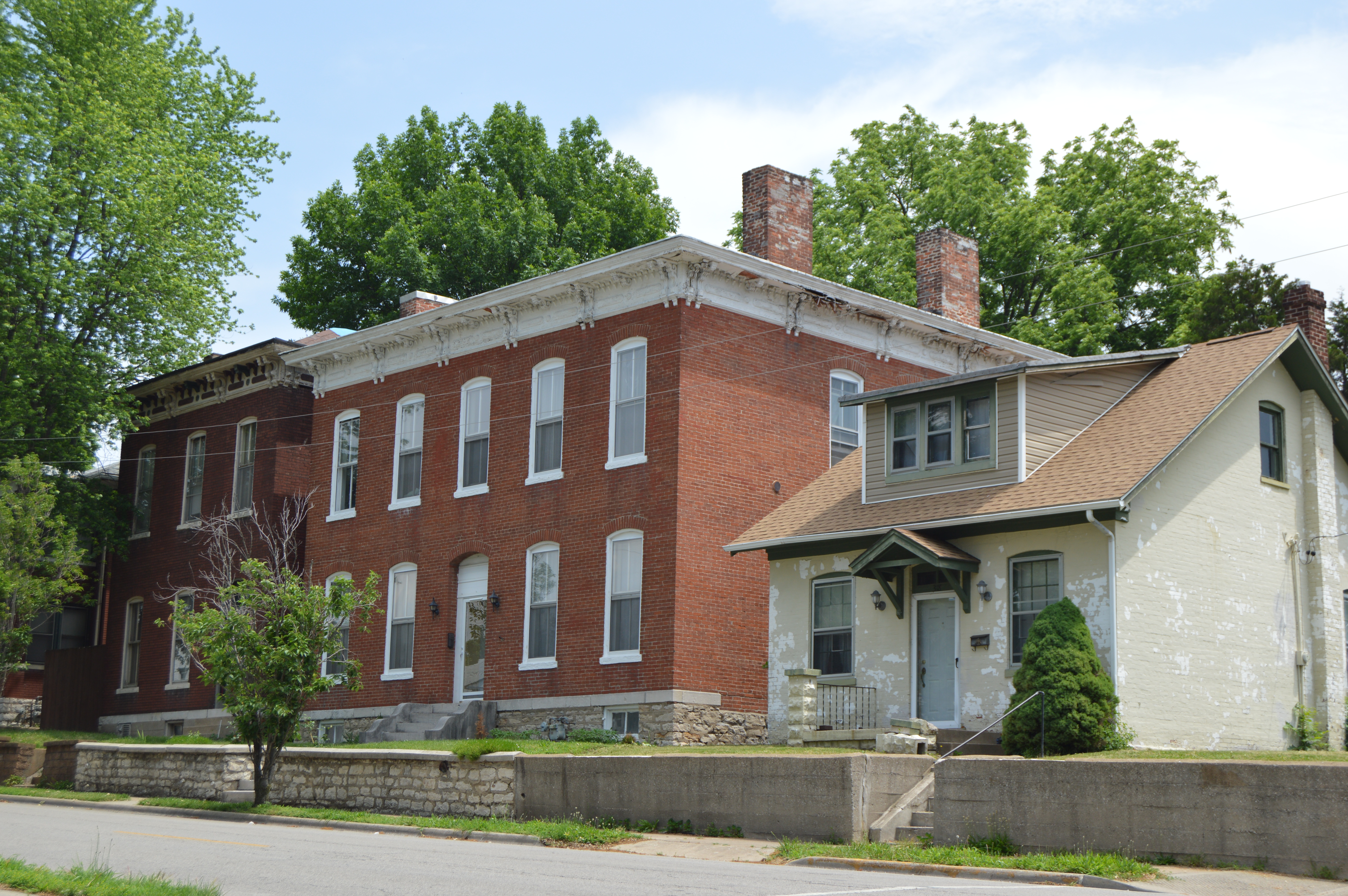
- Houses on Charles St.

- Location within Illinois Location within the United States
- Location: Belleville, St. Clair County, Illinois, USA
- Coordinates: 38°31′18″N 89°59′43″W
- Area: 154 acres (62 ha)
- Built: Various
- Architect: Various
- Architectural style: Italianate, Greek Revival, vernacular
- NRHP reference No.: 76002165
- Added to NRHP: November 7, 1976

The Belleville Historic District is a historic district in Belleville, Illinois. The primarily residential district consists of an irregularly shaped area on the east side of Belleville. 70 buildings are included in the district, all of which are contributing buildings to its historic character. The homes in the district represent Belleville's residential development from 1830 to 1900. Many of the houses were designed in a vernacular cottage style popular among the city's German immigrants; while common in Belleville and other Metro-East cities, the style is little seen elsewhere in the state. Formal architectural styles such as Greek Revival and Italianate are also prevalent in the district.

The district was added to the National Register of Historic Places on November 7, 1976.

== Homes of Historic Interest within the Belleville Historic District ==
Champion House - 218 S Charles St Belleville, IL - https://champion.house/

Koerner House - 200 Abend St Belleville, IL - https://gustavekoerner.org/
