= Nico Holthaus =

American polymath (born 1971)

Nicholas "Nico" Holthaus
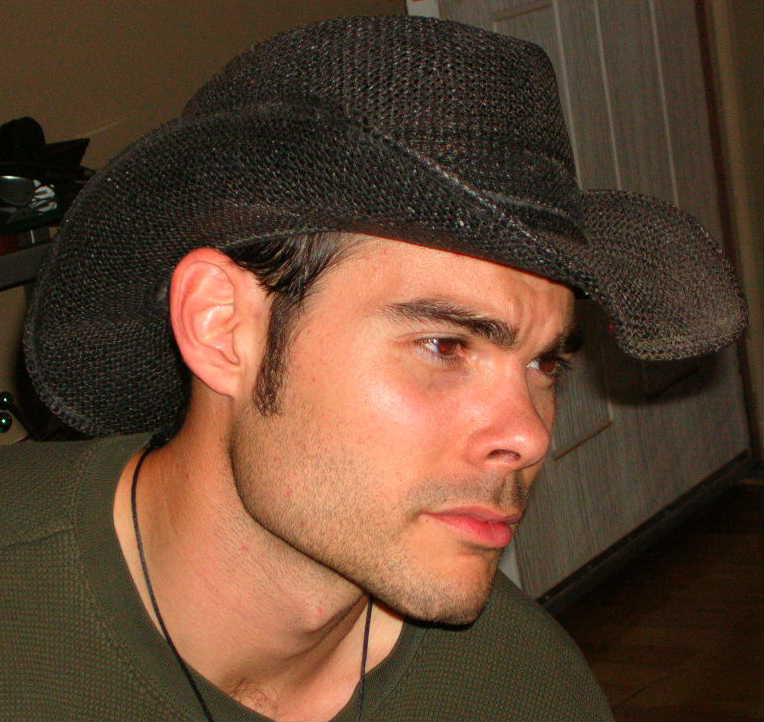
- Nicholas "Nico" Holthaus, circa 2010, Phoenix, AZ, USA
- Born: August 4, 1971 (age 55); Belleville, Illinois, U.S.
- Occupations: Producer, writer, consultant, musician, actor, Assistant Professor
- Years active: 1992–present

Nico Holthaus (born Nicholas Holthaus; August 4, 1971) is an independent American polymath, writer, musician, filmmaker, producer of music, haunted attractions, and documentary and narrative films. He has won critical acclaim as the executive producer of the national Main St. Inc series and Dear America, a documentary that promotes Senator Mike Gravel’s National Initiative for Democracy, featuring Direct democracy proponents such as Ralph Nader, Noam Chomsky, Daniel Ellsberg, Pete Seeger, Max Brooks, production members of the re-imagined Battlestar Galactica series, ex-Nirvana bassist and chairman of FairVote Krist Novoselic and Chancellors, Senators, Representatives and other notable public figures around the world.

== Biography ==
=== Early life ===
Born in Belleville, Illinois, to Edwin, a second generation German heavy equipment operator, and Susan Salatino, a second generation Italian medical transcriptionist. At age 16 his mother left his father and moved him and his sister, Becky, to Arlington Heights, where he graduated from Buffalo Grove High School in 1989. He briefly played football and baseball at Illinois College, in Jacksonville, Illinois.

As a teen and in his early 20s, he traveled the Midwest, living briefly in different locales such as Rockford, IL and Milwaukee, WI. From 1989 to 1993 he modeled for various agencies around the Chicago and St. Louis areas, and began writing short stories, novels and music. In 1991, he co-founded and was frontman-singer for The Canaille, an alternative rock band, later to be known as Dorian Grey.

== Academia, IT, music and film ==
In 1993, he moved to Tempe, Arizona, to become part of the burgeoning Tempe music scene, and eventually befriending and/or working with members of Gin Blossoms, Dead Hot Workshop, The Refreshments, Meat Puppets, Flathead, Gloritone, Chicken, Walt Richardson and Hans Olson, et al., in different capacities.

In 1997, he received his Bachelor of Arts in humanities, and minored in Anthropology at Arizona State University, graduating cum laude. He worked as a technician at Avnet CMG (Chandler, AZ facility), building computers, servers and peripherals. In 2000, he returned to Arizona State University to pursue a master's in Film and Media Studies. It was during this transition period that he befriended filmmakers, and he bought his first broadcast quality video camera, and began shooting venues he played at or attended in Tempe. Years later he would compile this footage, begin interviewing Tempe's popular cultural and political leaders, and assemble all these into the highly regarded Mill Ave Inc documentary, which chronicled Tempe's corporate hegemony, and effectively aided in closing the doors of several "big box" chain stores, and helping independents move back on to Mill Avenue.

He was a tutor in the Arizona State University Writing Center from 1995 to 1997, focusing on English composition, grammar and ESL.

In 1999, he began writing, producing and directing his first feature film, Dante's Arizona, a tongue-in-cheek title for a story based loosely on Dante's Inferno, and starring Aja Evans, Hans Olson, Paul Cook and himself, and implementing music from local AZ musicians Hans Olson, Flathead, Dead Hot Workshop, Gloritone, members of Gin Blossoms, and others. After the deaths of five people involved in the making of the film, and his mother's passing from cancer, it was finally released in 2005, to a limited number of screenings.

In 2000, he became proofreader/editor of the Superstition Mountain Historical Society Journal, a position he currently retains as of this writing. The SMSH Journal is a quarterly publication featuring articles on Lost Dutchman's Gold Mine and other Arizona historical legends, places and events written by various authors and historians such as Marshall Trimble, Clay Worst and Tom Kollenborn.

In 2008, he approached Senator Mike Gravel to volunteer as a proofreader for his presidential campaign and platform. Soon after, he was asked to be the executive producer of Dear America, a documentary discussing the National Initiative for Democracy, a constitutional amendment proposal that would effectively act as a check and balance against the current three branches of US government, and wherein the people could enact legislation themselves, without Congress or corporate influence. This documentary is slated for a Summer, 2022 international release date.

With the critical success of Mill Ave Inc in 2008 Holthaus began a national series focusing on the socio-cultural and economic pitfalls of corporate “big box” chain stores in the downtowns of different cities. Its immediate followup was The Avenue (aka 4th Ave Inc), a Tucson documentary directed by Alan Williams and edited by Chris Valentine (editor and co-producer of Mill Ave Inc, Beneath the Beauty), which won AIFF's “Best AZ Film of 2011” award. St Louis's Delmar Inc, Austin’s 6th St Inc, and several other cities have begun shooting their segments in the series, as of this writing. In 2008, he was elected to the Board of the Arizona Music and Entertainment Hall of Fame.

In 2009, Holthaus was asked to film a documentary investigating political corruption in Montana. The result was the controversial Beneath the Beauty (2010), which documented concerns from questionable real estate development deals to alleged police brutality cases and MT Senator Max Baucus's apparent collusion with pharmaceutical corporations in drafting the "Obamacare" health care bill.

In the Fall of 2011, Holthaus earned his Masters of Fine Arts degree (summa cum laude) in Film and Media Studies, taught as a TA and RA, and designed two Film and Media courses for the University of Montana. In 2024 he received his PhD in American Studies, with a concentration in US History, Politics, and Critical Media Studies. His dissertation focused on the parallel between popular "dark" post-9/11 TV shows and US legislation, policies and resultant culture.

In 2013, he successfully completed Stuck Outside of Phoenix, a feature-length drama based on the internationally renowned Tempe music scene of the 1990s, as encapsulated by the Art Edwards (co-founder and co-writer of The Refreshments) novel of the same name. He is currently producing a feature Western thriller based on the Montana Vigilantes, and a Western horror, The Dark West, featuring stars such as Blanchard Ryan (Open Water, Broken Lizard comedies), and Richard Fortus (guitarist for Guns N' Roses).

Holthaus is also known for various Halloween-themed enterprises, including producing and directing haunted houses and giving tours of haunted places across the country. In addition to haunt production, he has designed 6'-8' custom Halloween Trees for public sales, and wrote a Halloween children's book, Poof’s First Halloween, with illustrator Kirstin Garber, to be published in September 2018. Due to disabling health developments in 2017, he will likely discontinue physical production of haunts, but will serve as consultant for others' haunts and continue his personal and academic work as Halloween/holiday historian and writer.

== Filmography ==
- 1999: “Dead Heat” (dramatic short). Producer, lead actor.
- 2000: “Save The Homeless.” (comedy short). Producer, lead actor.
- 2004: Dante's Arizona. Director, producer, lead actor, score.
- 2008: Mill Ave, Inc. Producer, director, videographer, narrator.
- 2008: Monsterpiece Theater. Line Producer/UPM, 2 segments.
- 2009: Beneath the Beauty. Producer, director, narrator.
- 2010: Global Forum for Direct Democracy. Producer, director.
- 2011: The Avenue (aka 4th Ave Inc). Executive Producer.
- 2013: Stuck Outside of Phoenix. Executive Producer, actor, casting director.
- 2014: Video for various commercial, sports and music companies. Producer, director.
- 2015: Certain Women, filmed in Montana, USA. Security.
- 2025: Dear America: The National Initiative for Democracy. Executive Producer.

== Haunted attractions ==
- 2004: produced and directed the Goldfield Haunted Town at Youngberg, Arizona AZ.
- 2005: co-produced and co-directed The Magalia Murders, near Chico and Paradise, California, California.
- 2006 - 2008: directed Doomtown at Rawhide Western Theme Town in Chandler, AZ.
- 2008 - 2009: researched and directed guided tours in Belleville, Illinois's Main Street district.
- 2010: researched and presented a haunted tour of Helena, Montana.
- 2011: designed and marketed the first globally-marketed Halloween Trees, with Phoenix artist and sculptor Larry Lopresti.
- 2012: helped build others' haunted houses in Phoenix, AZ, providing props, consultation and construction.
- 2013: set designed, coordinated and provided props to Sail Inn (Tempe, AZ) for its Halloween weekend.
- 2014: makeup artist at Rob Zombie's Great American Nightmare, and provided props, materials and consultation to other national haunts.
- 2015: created "The Vigilantes Return" in Dillon, MT. Attraction cancelled due to lack of actors.
- 2016: created props for horror films and haunted houses, based on technical advice from John Carl Buechler, et al.
- 2017: created, provided props and sound designs, visual direction and physical construction for Livingston, MT's UNLIVINGston haunted attraction.
- 2018: published his first children's book Poof's First Halloween.
- 2019: second edition and printing of Poof's First Halloween; provided props to a Missoula, MT haunted attraction
- 2020: neither produced nor directed haunted attractions due to Covid-2019.
- 2021: published Amazon e-book of Poof's First Halloween.
- 2022: constructed his first haunted village diorama
- 2023: consulted on Halloween events in Phoenix, Chicago, and Sacramento
