= Long Wong's =

Former nightclub in Tempe Arizona

Coordinates: 33.4229°N 111.9397°W

Long Wong's on Mill was a club in Tempe, Arizona. Long Wong's on Mill was the center of the Tempe music scene, which peaked in the early 1990s, and it was where the Tempe band the Gin Blossoms got their start. In turn, the popular band made the club famous. Long Wong's also featured Tempe based bands such as Dead Hot Workshop and The Refreshments, who went on to sign with major record labels. Long Wong's closed on April 3, 2004.
