= Belleville, Illinois =

- City
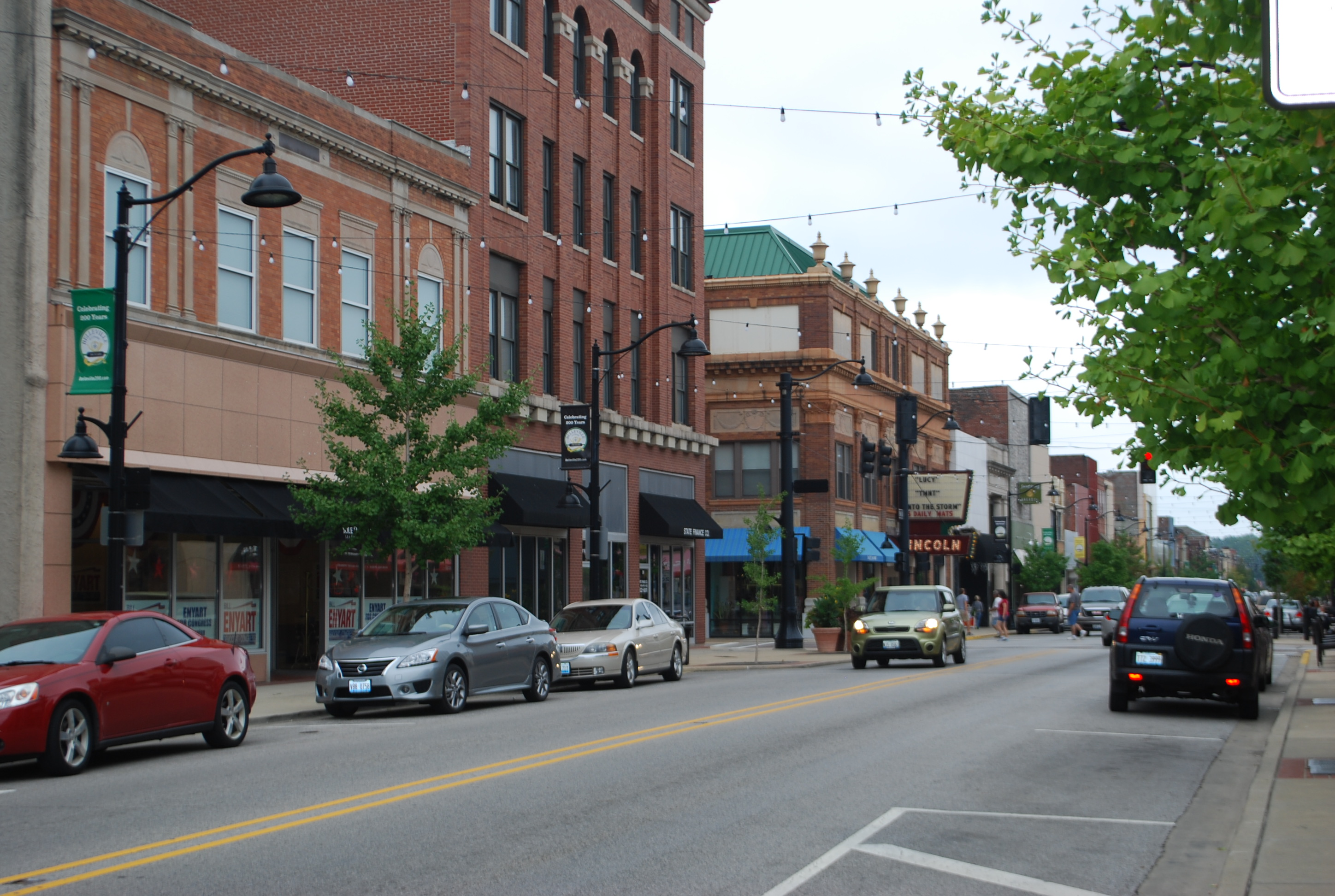
- Main Street

- Flag
- Interactive map of Belleville, Illinois
- Location within Illinois Location within the United States
- Coordinates: 38°30′26″N 89°59′23″W
- Country: United States
- State: Illinois
- County: St. Clair
- Founded: 1814

Area
  - Total: 23.49 sq mi (60.84 km^{2})
  - Land: 23.23 sq mi (60.17 km^{2})
  - Water: 0.26 sq mi (0.67 km^{2})
- Elevation: 499 ft (152 m)

Population (2020)
  - Total: 42,404
  - Density: 1,825.2/sq mi (704.71/km^{2})
- Time zone: UTC−6 (CST)
  - Summer (DST): UTC−5 (CDT)
- ZIP Codes: 62220–62223, 62225, 62226
- Area code: 618
- FIPS code: 17-163-04858
- GNIS feature ID: 2394118
- Website: belleville.net

Belleville is a city in St. Clair County, Illinois, United States, and its county seat. It is a southeastern suburb of St. Louis. The population was 42,404 at the 2020 census, making it the most populous city in Greater St. Louis's Metro East region and in all of Southern Illinois south of Springfield. Due to its proximity to Scott Air Force Base, the city has a significant population of military and federal civilian personnel. It is the seat of the Roman Catholic Diocese of Belleville and home to the National Shrine of Our Lady of the Snows.

== History ==
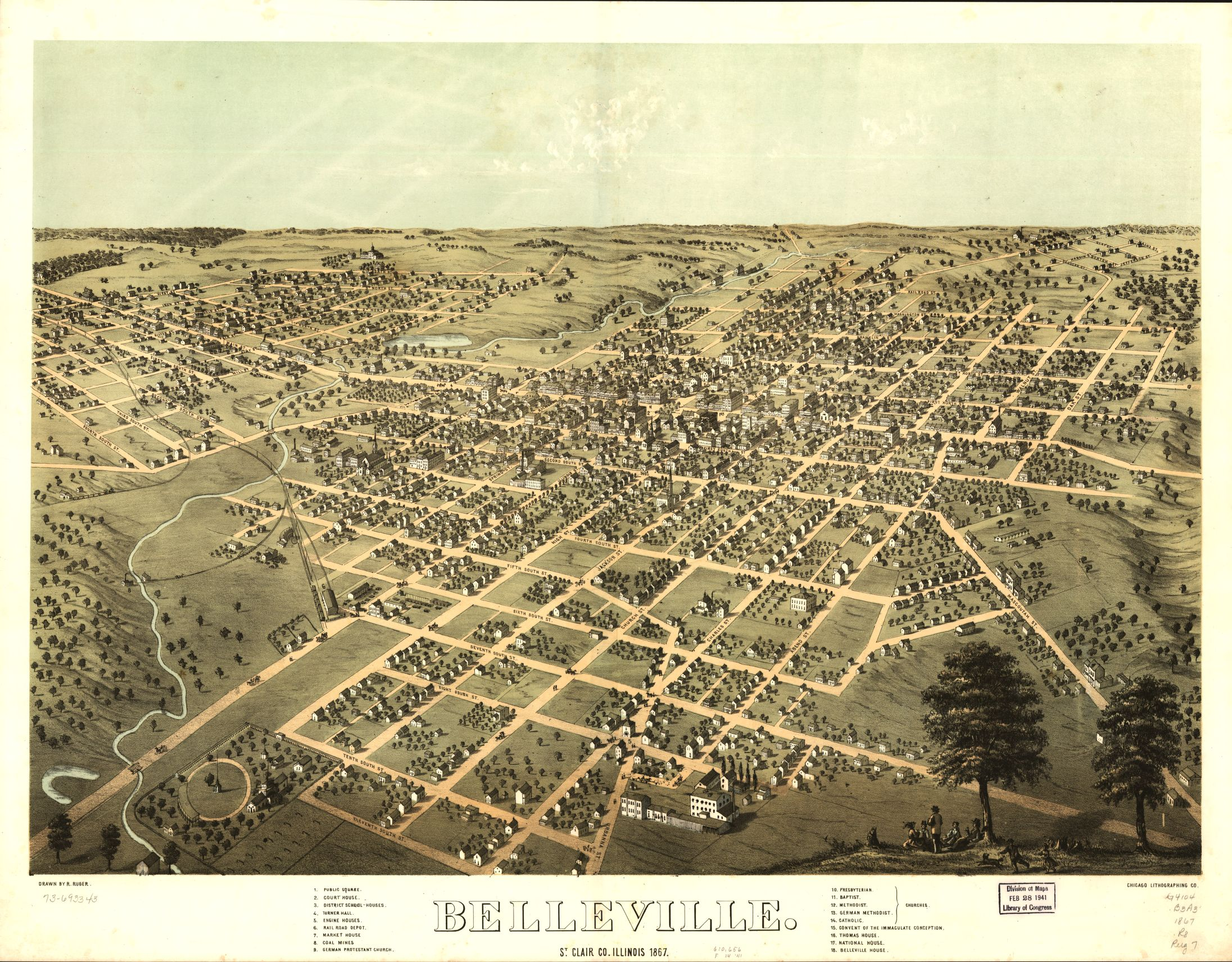
Bird's eye view of Belleville in 1867.

In 1814, George Blair named Belleville after the French phrase belle ville, meaning "beautiful city". Because Blair donated an acre of his land for the town square and an additional 25 acres (10 ha) adjoining the square for the new county seat, the legislature transferred the county seat from the village of Cahokia, which French colonists had established as a mission village in the late 17th century.

Belleville was incorporated as a village in 1819, and became a city in 1850. Major immigration in the mid-19th century to this area occurred following revolutions in Germany, and most of the European-American population is of German ancestry. Many of the educated Germans fled their homeland after the failure of the Revolutions of 1848 in the German states. Belleville was the center of Illinois's first major German settlement. By 1870, an estimated 90% of the city's population was either German-born or of German descent.

After the Civil War, Belleville became a manufacturing center, producing nails, printing presses, gray iron castings, agricultural equipment, and stoves. It became known as "The Stove Capital of the World". Illinois's first brewery was established in Belleville. In 1868, Gustav Goelitz founded the candy company known today as "Jelly Belly".

An immense deposit (400,000 acres (1,600 km^{2})) of bituminous coal was found in St. Clair County. By 1874, some farmers had become coal miners. One hundred shaft mines were in operation in and around Belleville. The coal brought the steam railroad to town, which allowed for the daily shipment of tons of coal from Belleville to St. Louis for use in its industries, homes and businesses. Later, Belleville had the state's first electric trolley.

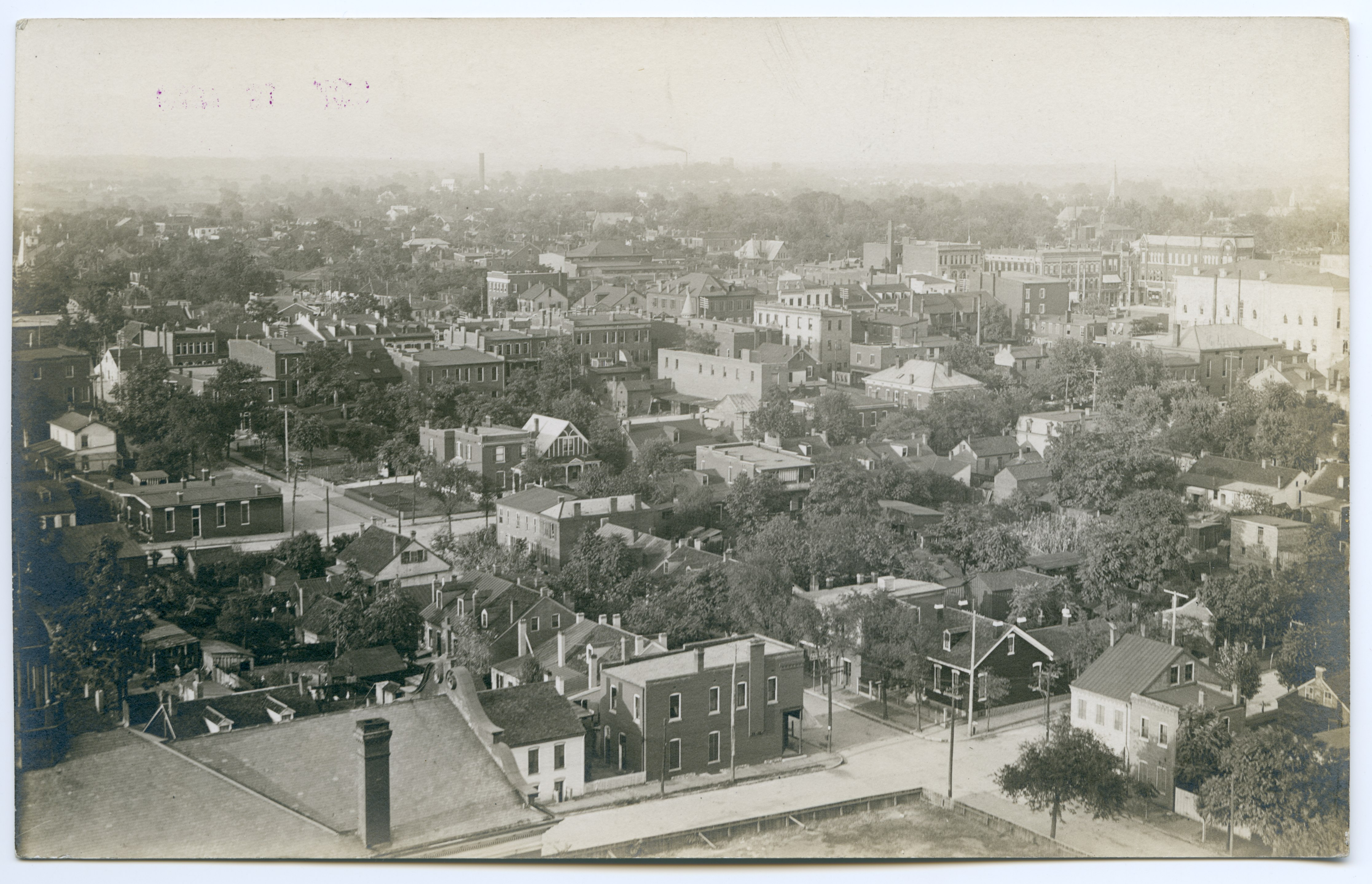
Belleville as it appeared in 1910.

Belleville's first houses were simple brick cottages, known locally as "German street houses" or "row houses." Architectural styles flourished in greater variety, featuring American Foursquare, French Second Empire, Greek Revival, Gothic Revival, Italianate, Queen Anne, and Victorian. The Belleville Historic District, which was listed on the National Register of Historic Places in 1976, comprises 73 contributing properties.

The Old Belleville Historic District was defined and recognized in 1974 and is the city's first historic district. The city also has designated two more historic districts: Hexenbuckel, established in 1991, and Oakland, established in 1995.

Belleville's early German immigrants were educated, most of them having graduated from German universities. They were nicknamed "Latin Farmers" because of this. After 1836, Gustav Koerner contributed to establish the Belleville Public Library, which is the state's oldest, predating the Illinois State Library by three years. The German settlers also founded choirs, theater groups, and literary societies, and established one of the nation's first kindergartens.

In 1990, Belleville surpassed neighboring East St. Louis to become the most populous city in the Metro East and in Southern Illinois.

The National Civic League recognized Belleville in 2011 as one of the ten recipients of the All-America City Award. Belleville is coterminous with the now defunct Belleville Township.

Major employers within the city limits include BJC HealthCare (doing business as Memorial Hospital), Empire Comfort Systems, Peerless Premier Appliance, Allsup, Belleville Boot Company, Illinois American Water (corporate office, quality control and research laboratory), Permobil US, Roesch Inc., Beno J. Gundlach Co., Chelar Tool & Die, International Paper, Triple Sticks Food Inc., Kaskaskia Engineering, and Mathis Marifian & Richter Ltd.

In 2021, Belleville elected Patty Gregory as its first female mayor.

== Belleville Police Department ==
The Belleville Police Department was established in 1814 when Belleville was first organized as a village. At the time, the department consisted of a lone constable, who made up the entirety of the department. In 1850, the position of a city marshal was created due to the growth of the community. In 1854, the City Council voted to give the city marshal additional help by appointing a deputy marshal to four different sectors that made up the city. By 1867, the department had a city marshal, chief of police, a captain of the night police, and four policemen. By 1890, there were 12 people in the department- the city marshal, the night police captain, a sergeant, and 9 policemen. In 1913, there were 15 policemen. By 1939, there were 21 members in the department, and by 1951, there were 35 members. As of 2025, there are 75 sworn-in members of the Belleville Police Department, and more than 25 civilian support personnel who make up the department.

== Geography ==
According to the 2010 census, Belleville has a total area of 23.49 square miles (60.84 km^{2}), of which 22.74 square miles (58.90 km^{2}) (or 98.83%) is land and 0.269 square miles (0.70 km^{2}) (or 1.17%) is water. Richland Creek flows through much of Belleville.

=== Climate ===
Climate data for Belleville SIU Research, Illinois (1991–2020 normals, extremes 1948–present)
Month	Jan	Feb	Mar	Apr	May	Jun	Jul	Aug	Sep	Oct	Nov	Dec	Year
Record high °F (°C)	75 (24)	83 (28)	89 (32)	91 (33)	97 (36)	106 (41)	110 (43)	105 (41)	103 (39)	96 (36)	84 (29)	78 (26)	110 (43)
Mean maximum °F (°C)	64.0 (17.8)	70.2 (21.2)	78.6 (25.9)	84.7 (29.3)	89.8 (32.1)	95.2 (35.1)	97.3 (36.3)	96.8 (36.0)	93.5 (34.2)	87.3 (30.7)	75.2 (24.0)	65.5 (18.6)	98.8 (37.1)
Mean daily maximum °F (°C)	42.9 (6.1)	48.6 (9.2)	59.2 (15.1)	70.6 (21.4)	79.1 (26.2)	87.3 (30.7)	90.2 (32.3)	89.1 (31.7)	83.3 (28.5)	72.6 (22.6)	58.1 (14.5)	46.3 (7.9)	68.9 (20.5)
Daily mean °F (°C)	33.6 (0.9)	38.3 (3.5)	47.8 (8.8)	58.3 (14.6)	67.7 (19.8)	75.9 (24.4)	79.0 (26.1)	77.2 (25.1)	70.1 (21.2)	59.7 (15.4)	47.5 (8.6)	37.3 (2.9)	57.7 (14.3)
Mean daily minimum °F (°C)	24.3 (−4.3)	28.0 (−2.2)	36.3 (2.4)	46.0 (7.8)	56.3 (13.5)	64.5 (18.1)	67.8 (19.9)	65.3 (18.5)	56.9 (13.8)	46.7 (8.2)	36.9 (2.7)	28.3 (−2.1)	46.4 (8.0)
Mean minimum °F (°C)	1.7 (−16.8)	8.6 (−13.0)	16.3 (−8.7)	28.7 (−1.8)	39.7 (4.3)	50.7 (10.4)	56.5 (13.6)	53.4 (11.9)	40.3 (4.6)	27.8 (−2.3)	18.0 (−7.8)	8.4 (−13.1)	−1.8 (−18.8)
Record low °F (°C)	−27 (−33)	−21 (−29)	−8 (−22)	18 (−8)	28 (−2)	38 (3)	43 (6)	39 (4)	26 (−3)	19 (−7)	2 (−17)	−19 (−28)	−27 (−33)
Average precipitation inches (mm)	2.56 (65)	2.16 (55)	3.44 (87)	4.90 (124)	5.05 (128)	4.62 (117)	4.03 (102)	3.92 (100)	3.35 (85)	3.12 (79)	3.60 (91)	2.61 (66)	43.36 (1,101)
Average snowfall inches (cm)	3.4 (8.6)	3.3 (8.4)	1.0 (2.5)	0.0 (0.0)	0.0 (0.0)	0.0 (0.0)	0.0 (0.0)	0.0 (0.0)	0.0 (0.0)	0.0 (0.0)	0.6 (1.5)	2.9 (7.4)	11.2 (28)
Average precipitation days (≥ 0.01 in)	7.1	7.5	9.5	10.3	11.5	8.7	7.4	7.2	6.6	8.4	7.7	7.7	99.6
Average snowy days (≥ 0.1 in)	2.2	1.9	0.6	0.0	0.0	0.0	0.0	0.0	0.0	0.0	0.4	1.9	7.0
Source: NOAA

== Demographics ==
Historical population
Census	Pop.	Note	%±
1850	2,941		—
1860	7,520		155.7%
1870	8,146		8.3%
1880	10,683		31.1%
1890	15,361		43.8%
1900	17,484		13.8%
1910	21,122		20.8%
1920	24,823		17.5%
1930	28,425		14.5%
1940	28,405		−0.1%
1950	32,721		15.2%
1960	37,264		13.9%
1970	41,223		10.6%
1980	41,580		0.9%
1990	42,785		2.9%
2000	41,410		−3.2%
2010	44,478		7.4%
2020	42,404		−4.7%
2023 (est.)	40,726		−4.0%
U.S. Decennial Census

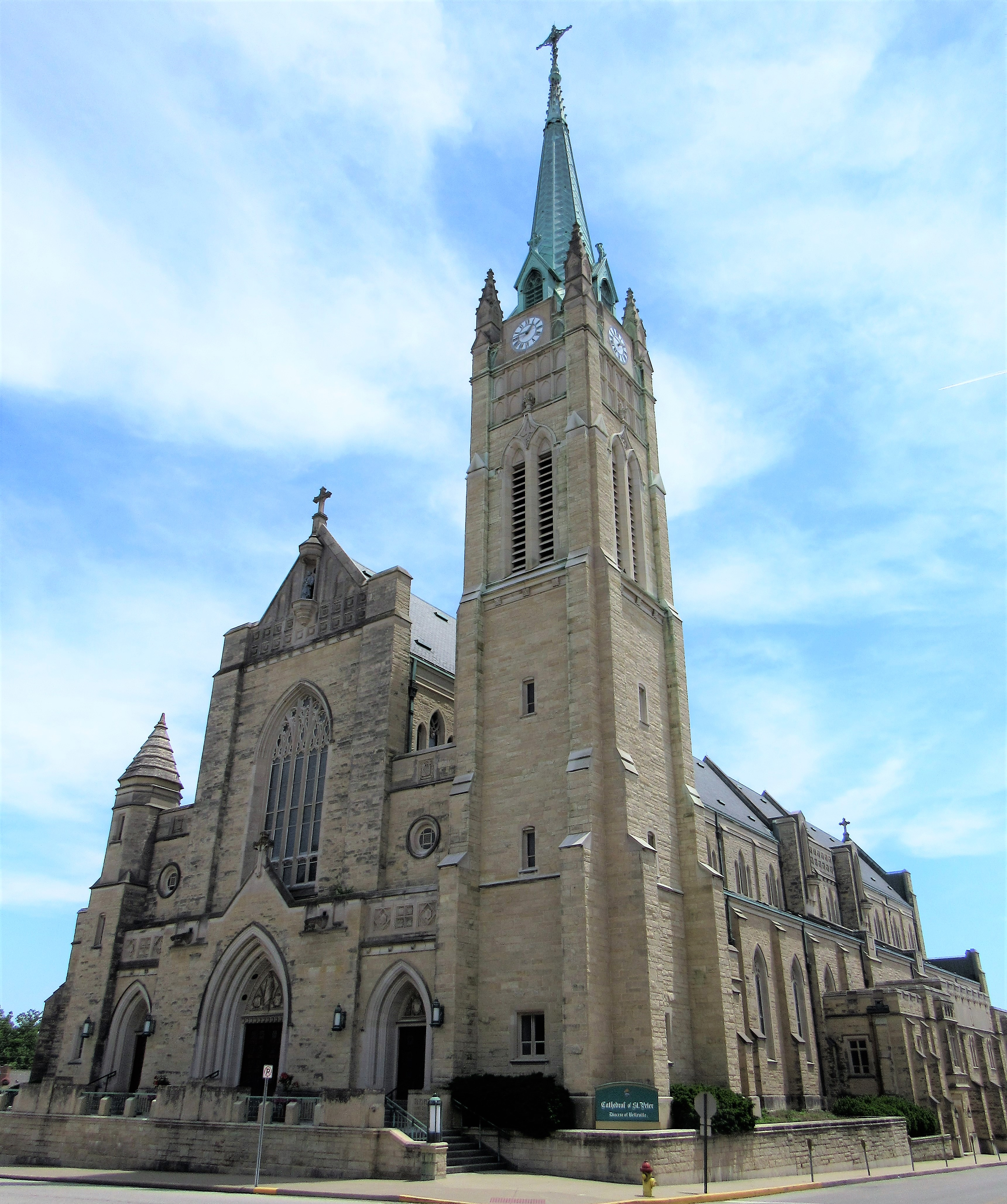
Cathedral of Saint Peter

=== Racial and ethnic composition ===
Belleville city, Illinois – Racial and ethnic composition Note: the US Census treats Hispanic/Latino as an ethnic category. This table excludes Latinos from the racial categories and assigns them to a separate category. Hispanics/Latinos may be of any race.
Race / Ethnicity (NH = Non-Hispanic)	Pop 2000	Pop 2010	Pop 2020	% 2000	% 2010	% 2020
White alone (NH)	33,341	30,345	24,171	80.51%	68.22%	57.00%
Black or African American alone (NH)	6,377	11,231	13,569	15.40%	25.25%	32.00%
Native American or Alaska Native alone (NH)	92	113	90	0.22%	0.25%	0.21%
Asian alone (NH)	328	424	418	0.79%	0.95%	0.99%
Native Hawaiian or Pacific Islander alone (NH)	23	25	33	0.06%	0.06%	0.08%
Other race alone (NH)	57	72	186	0.14%	0.16%	0.44%
Mixed race or Multiracial (NH)	515	1,105	2,343	1.24%	2.48%	5.53%
Hispanic or Latino (any race)	677	1,163	1,594	1.63%	2.61%	3.76%
Total	41,410	44,478	42,404	100.00%	100.00%	100.00%

=== 2020 census ===
As of the 2020 census, Belleville had a population of 42,404. The median age was 38.6 years. 22.5% of residents were under the age of 18 and 15.8% of residents were 65 years of age or older. For every 100 females there were 91.3 males, and for every 100 females age 18 and over there were 88.2 males age 18 and over.

99.6% of residents lived in urban areas, while 0.4% lived in rural areas.

There were 17,993 households in Belleville, of which 27.9% had children under the age of 18 living in them. Of all households, 34.7% were married-couple households, 21.4% were households with a male householder and no spouse or partner present, and 36.7% were households with a female householder and no spouse or partner present. About 36.4% of all households were made up of individuals and 13.3% had someone living alone who was 65 years of age or older.

There were 20,573 housing units, of which 12.5% were vacant. The homeowner vacancy rate was 3.7% and the rental vacancy rate was 11.5%.

Racial composition as of the 2020 census
Race	Number	Percent
White	24,579	58.0%
Black or African American	13,667	32.2%
American Indian and Alaska Native	137	0.3%
Asian	431	1.0%
Native Hawaiian and Other Pacific Islander	36	0.1%
Some other race	596	1.4%
Two or more races	2,958	7.0%
Hispanic or Latino (of any race)	1,594	3.8%

=== 2010 census ===
As of the 2010 Census, there were 44,478 people, 18,795 households, 11,081 families living in the city. The population density was. The racial makeup of the city was 69.8% White, 25.4% African American, 0.3% Native American, 1.0% Asian, 0.1% Pacific Islander, 0.6% from other races, and 2.8% from two or more races. Hispanic or Latino of any race were 2.6% of the population

Of the 18,795 households 27.7% had children under the age of 18 living with them, 38% were married couples living together, 16.4 had a female householder with no man present, and 41% were non-families. 34.4% of households were one person and 10.8% had someone living alone who was 65 years of age of older. The average household size was 2.3 and the average family size was 2.9.

The age distribution was 23.3% under the age of 18, and 12.9% over the age of 65.

=== 2000 census ===
At the 2000 census there were 41,410 people, 17,603 households, and 10,420 families living in the city. The population density was 2,196.4 inhabitants per square mile (848.0/km^{2}). There were 19,142 housing units at an average density of 1,015.3 per square mile (392.0/km^{2}). The racial makeup of the city was 81.51% White, 15.51% African American, 0.26% Native American, 0.81% Asian, 0.07% Pacific Islander, 0.41% from other races, and 1.43% from two or more races. Hispanic or Latino of any race were 1.63%.

Of the 17,603 households 28.4% had children under the age of 18 living with them, 42.0% were married couples living together, 13.5% had a female householder with no husband present, and 40.8% were non-families. 35.1% of households were one person and 14.0% were one person aged 65 or older. The average household size was 2.27 and the average family size was 2.95.

The age distribution was 23.4% under the age of 18, 9.0% from 18 to 24, 30.3% from 25 to 44, 20.1% from 45 to 64, and 17.2% 65 or older. The median age was 37 years. For every 100 females, there were 88.9 males. For every 100 females age 18 and over, there were 85.0 males.

The median household income was $35,979 and the median family income was $46,426. Males had a median income of $33,361 versus $25,375 for females. The per capita income for the city was $18,990. About 9.3% of families and 11.7% of the population were below the poverty line, including 16.2% of those under age 18 and 9.3% of those age 65 or over.

== Arts and culture ==
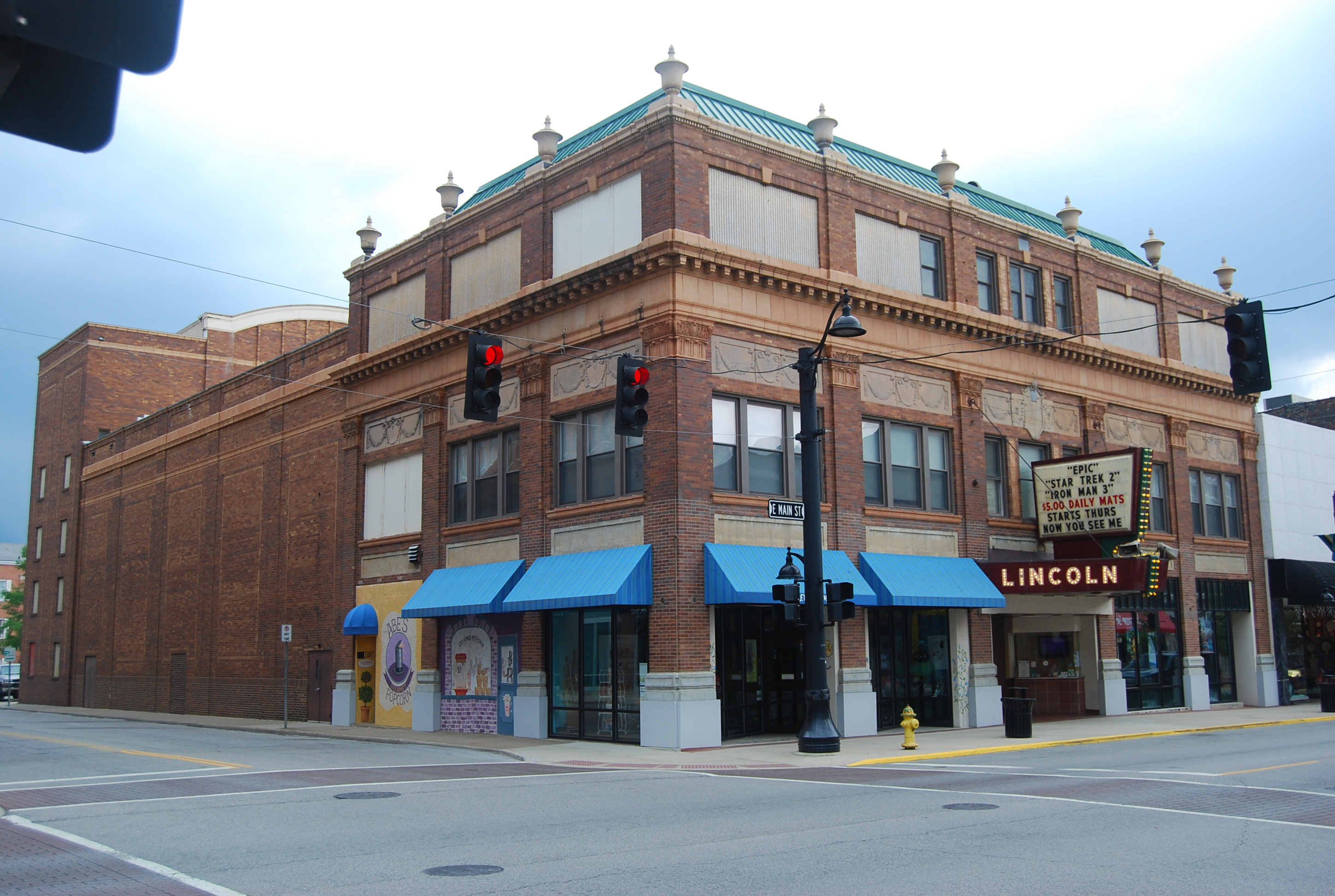
Lincoln Theatre

The Belleville Philharmonic Society was formed in 1866, making it the second oldest philharmonic orchestra in the country. With the increase in the black population and migrants from the South, musicians developed who played blues and jazz; later rock clubs were added to the scene.

Jay Farrar (now of Son Volt), Mike Heidorn, and Jeff Tweedy (now of Wilco) of the now-defunct alt country group Uncle Tupelo are from Belleville. Another major musician was Neal Doughty, keyboardist for 1970s rock band REO Speedwagon.

=== Museums ===
- Labor and Industry Museum – Opened in 2002 in the historic Conrad Bornman home constructed in 1837. The museum focuses on preserving artifacts which tell the story of the industrial past of Belleville through the museum’s exhibits and archives.
- Victorian Home Museum – Originally constructed in 1866 for German immigrant Morris Dobschutsz and renovated from apartments back into a Victorian-style for the opening of the Victorian Home Museum in 1968. The renovated home portrays the lives of Belleville wealthy residents during the Victorian era. The museum also features an exhibit on Abraham Lincoln’s visit to Belleville in 1856.
- Emma Kunz House – The Emma Kunz House Museum was opened in 1978 after being relocated and renovated. The building is an example of a “German Street House” and furnished in the style of a mid-19^{th} century working class family in Belleville

=== National Register of Historic Places ===
- Belleville Historic District
- Gustave Koerner House
- Knobeloch-Seibert Farm

=== Sports ===
- Rowdies Rugby Football Club – the only rugby football club in the Belleville area.
- Lindenwood Stadium is a college football stadium with alternating red and gray stripes. It has been called "The nation's most original (hideous) football field."
- Belleville was home to the Belleville Stags (1947–1949), who were a minor league baseball team. The Stags were charter members of the Illinois State League and remained when the league changed names to the Mississippi–Ohio Valley League in 1949, eventually becoming today's Midwest League in 1956. The Stags played at the Belleville Athletic Field and were named and supported by their namesake, Stag Beer. The Stags were an affiliate of the New York Yankees (1949) and St. Louis Browns (1947–1948).

== Education ==
Belleville Township High School District 201 is the public high school district.

Within Belleville are four high schools; namely, the public Belleville High School-East and Belleville High School-West (of the high school district), and the private Althoff Catholic High School (of the Roman Catholic Diocese of Belleville), and Governor French Academy.

In addition, small portions of the city are within these districts: East St. Louis School District 189 (which operates East St. Louis Senior High School), Mascoutah Community Unit School District 19 (which operates Mascoutah Community High School), and Freeburg Community High School District 77 (which operates Freeburg Community High School).

Belleville is also home to numerous grade school districts, including Belleville School District 118, Belle Valley School District 119, Harmony Emge School District 175, Signal Hill School District 181, Whiteside School District 115, and Freeburg Community Consolidated School District 70.

Parochial grade schools include St. Teresa Catholic, Blessed Sacrament Catholic, Our Lady Queen of Peace Catholic, and Zion Lutheran School. The Catholic schools belong to the diocese.

Higher education in Belleville includes Southwestern Illinois College, a public community college with its main campus adjacent to the city limits in unincorporated St. Clair Township. The city was formerly home to Lindenwood University – Belleville from 2009 to 2020.

== Media ==
The Belleville News-Democrat, is the city's daily newspaper. The News-Democrat is part of the McClatchy chain and covers the Metro East region and Southwestern Illinois. The city is also served by the St. Louis Post-Dispatch, the area's major metropolitan daily. Belleville receives the signals of most radio and TV stations based in St. Louis.

== Transportation ==
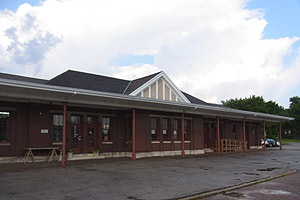
Former Illinois Central Railroad station

Belleville has three St. Louis MetroLink stations connecting it to St. Louis and the network via light rail: Memorial Hospital, Belleville, and College.

Illinois State Highways 15, 158, 159, 177, 13 and 161 all pass through Belleville. Belleville is also adjacent to Interstate highways 64 and 255. I-64 is an east–west highway extending from Wentzville, Missouri to Virginia Beach, Virginia and is the major route from Belleville to downtown St. Louis. I-255 is part of a system of expressways that together form a loop around St. Louis.

Belleville has a bicycle trail that runs through the city from Southside Park to Southwestern Illinois College and Scott Air Force Base; it is mainly used for recreational purposes.

Belleville's area airports are Scott Air Force Base and MidAmerica St. Louis Airport, which is served by Allegiant Air. The nearest major airport with regularly scheduled commercial passenger service is St. Louis Lambert International Airport.

Belleville had Amtrak service in the form of River Cities that went to New Orleans and Kansas City, but it since got removed.

== Healthcare ==
Bethany Place in Belleville provides services for those with HIV/AIDS.

== Notable people ==
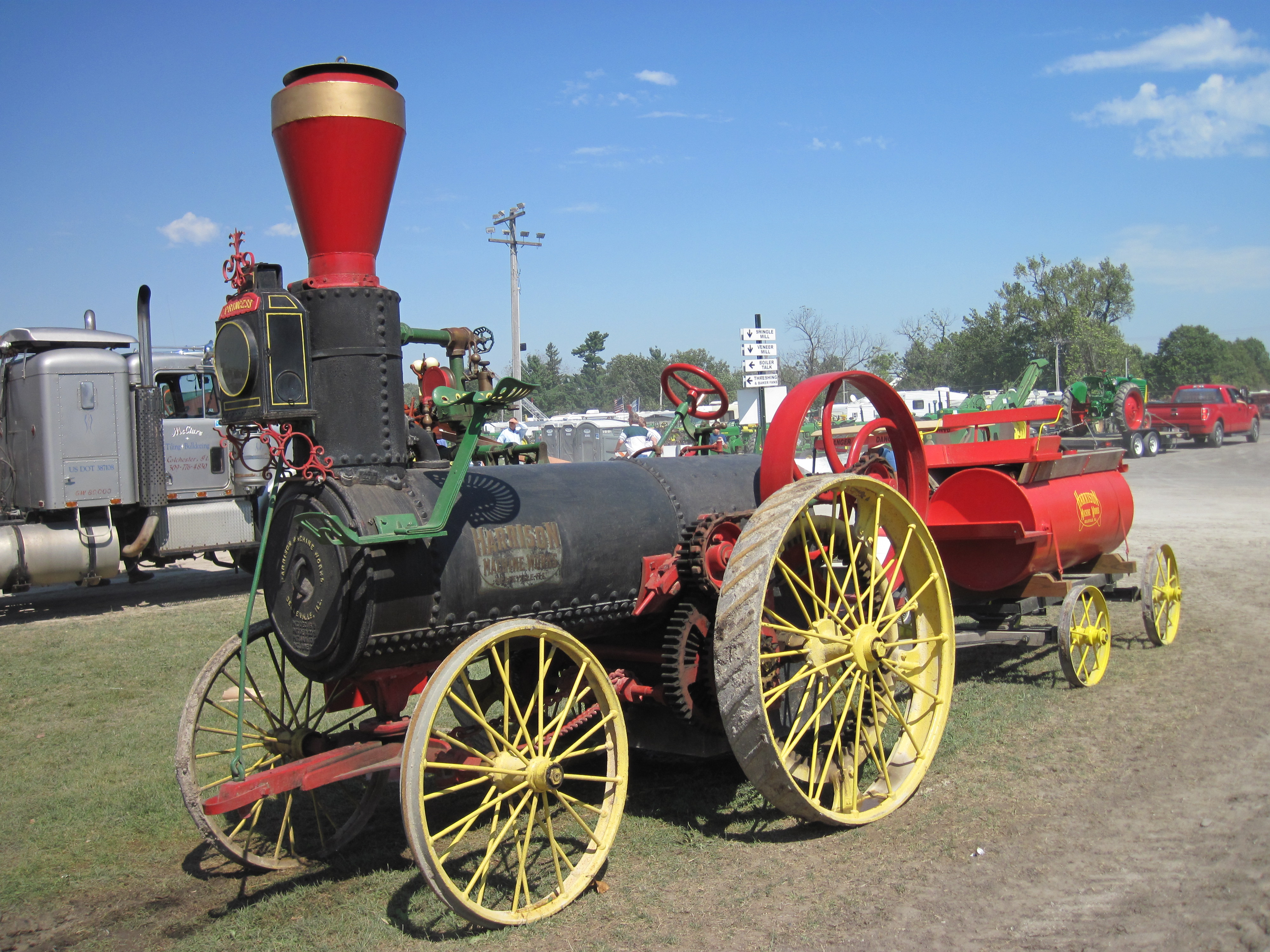
1882 Harrison Machine Works tractor, made in Belleville

- Black Beaver (1806–1880), Lenape leader, scout, and rancher
- William Henry Bissell (1811–1860), 11th Governor of Illinois
- Ryan Bollman, American actor
- Ken Bone, internet personality
- Charles Romyn Dake, 19th-century American homeopathic physician
- Jimmy Connors, American former world No. 1 tennis player
- Lea DeLaria, American comedian, actress, and jazz singer
- Buddy Ebsen, American actor and dancer
- Ninian Edwards (1775–1833), 3rd Governor of Illinois
- Jay Farrar, American songwriter and musician
- Mary Lynne Gasaway Hill, poet, writer, and Fellow of the Royal Society of Arts
- Bob Goalby, Professional golfer, winner of the 1968 Masters Tournament
- Rusty Lisch, quarterback for University of Notre Dame and multiple NFL teams
- Nicholas Holthaus, American writer, documentarian, musician and media producer
- Sandra Magnus, American engineer and a former NASA astronaut
- Darius Miles, former American professional basketball player
- James T. Mitchell (1834–1915), chief justice of the Supreme Court of Pennsylvania
- Edward P. Petri, Illinois state representative, sheriff, and businessman
- John Reynolds (1788–1865), 4th Governor of Illinois
- Mary Ellen Richmond, constructed the foundations for the development of professional social work
- Lorenda Starfelt, film producer
- Randy Stumpf, actor
- Jeff Tweedy, musician, songwriter, author, and record producer
- Kevin Von Erich, an American retired professional wrestler
- Stephen R. Wigginton, U.S. Attorney for the Southern District of Illinois from 2010 to 2015.

== Sister city ==
Belleville has one sister city:

- Paderborn, Germany
