= Rowdies Rugby Football Club =

- Full name: Rowdies Rugby Football Club
- Union: Mid-America Geographical Union
- Nickname(s): Rowdies
- Founded: 1978
- Ground(s): Belleville Jaycee Park, Belleville, Illinois, United States
- President: Rob Massey
- Coach(es): Russ Ellis
1st kit	2nd kit	3rd kit

The Rowdies Rugby Football Club is a Division III rugby union team based out of Belleville, Illinois, United States. It is a member of the Mid-America Geographical Union. The Rowdies plays in the East region. The Rowdies also play Sevens Rugby in the St. Louis Sevens League, finishing in third place in 2010 and 2011.

== History ==
The Rowdies Rugby Football Club was formed in 1978 as the Scott Rowdies Rugby Football Club. In 2006, the name was changed to reflect the diversity of the players on the club. In previous years, most of the players were active duty military stationed at nearby Scott Air Force Base, Illinois. Today, the club still has many active duty military members, yet also draws members from the St. Louis area, including Belleville, Highland, Mascoutah, O'Fallon, Granite City, and St. Louis, MO.

In 2005, the Rowdies Rugby Football Club won the Missouri Rugby Football Union Division III championship, defeating Fort Leonard Wood on October 29, 2005. In the spring of 2006, the Rowdies Rugby Football Club traveled to Fort Worth, Texas for the Western Rugby Football Union championships, as the Division III representative for the Missouri Rugby Football Union.

In 2011, The Rowdies played their first season in the Illinois Rugby Union, playing well enough to advance to the Midwest Playoffs.

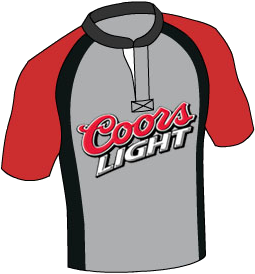
Rowdies Rugby Football Club's new jersey

== Home Grounds ==
The Rowdies conduct training and all home matches at Belleville Jaycee Park, Belleville, Illinois. Recently, the Belleville Parks Department spent time and money improving the field and installing rugby goalposts.

== Honors ==
- 2012 Carbondale All Fool's Men's Division 1st place
