= Stephen Shadegg =

Arizona political consultant and author (1909–1990)

Chair of the Arizona Republican Party
- In office 1960–1961
- Preceded by: Richard Kleindienst
- Succeeded by: Richard Kleindienst

Personal details
- Born: Stephen Caroyl Shadegg; December 8, 1909 Minneapolis, Minnesota, U.S.
- Died: April 16, 1990 (aged 80) Phoenix, Arizona, U.S.
- Party: Republican
- Spouse(s): Eugenia Kerr Shadegg (d. 1987)
- Children: 4, including John

Stephen Caroyl Shadegg (December 8, 1909 – April 16, 1990) was a conservative political consultant, public relations specialist, and writer from his adopted city of Phoenix, Arizona.

== Background ==
Born in Minneapolis, Minnesota, and reared in Redlands, California. He worked extensively as a writer and published hundreds of stories in pulp magazines before his interest turned to politics. In 1932, he moved to Phoenix, where he authored radio scripts for such programs as "Tales of Pioneer Days" and "Phoenix Sun Ranch Chuck Wagon". He spent much of 1939–1940 in Hollywood, where he wrote scripts for RKO Pictures.

In the late 1940s, he developed a political and religious philosophy based on evangelical principles and opposition to liberal social policy, though he continued to worship as an Episcopalian.

== Political life ==
Over several decades Shadegg managed more than forty campaigns in Arizona for offices at all levels of government. First a Democrat, he worked on the 1942 campaign of Lon Jordan for sheriff of Maricopa County.

Those columns provided most of the material that appeared under Goldwater's name in The Conscience of a Conservative, a 1960 political tract written by L. Brent Bozell.

In 1962, at Goldwater's urging, Shadegg ran in the Republican primary for the right to challenge Senator Carl Hayden for re-election, but he lost the primary to Evan Mecham, later a short-term governor of Arizona. Goldwater endorsed no candidate in the primary race.

In 1964, Shadegg served as western regional director of Goldwater's unsuccessful presidential campaign. He managed Goldwater's unsuccessful primary race in Oregon against Nelson Rockefeller, the governor of New York. For the general election, his western states assignment was Region VII: Arizona, Oregon, Washington, Idaho, Utah, Nevada, Montana, Wyoming, New Mexico, Alaska, and Hawaii. Of those states, only Arizona voted for Goldwater and by a narrow margin over U.S. President Lyndon B. Johnson.

Shadegg ran several more campaigns for Republicans, both in Arizona and in several other states.

== Literary life ==
In August 1964, he published How to Win an Election: The Art of Political Victory. This book frankly describes Shadegg's belief that voters who are indifferent to issues and are easily led to vote even against their own interests provide the margin of victory in elections.

After Goldwater's defeat, he published an insider's account of the campaign, What Happened to Goldwater?, which revealed that Goldwater's national campaign manager, Denison Kitchel, also of Phoenix, had been an early member of the John Birch Society. The New York Times reviewer recommended the book: "students of political organization and political philosophy will find many other minor fascinations in these pages, not least of which is the author's ambivalent attitude toward his hero."

Shadegg in 1970 authored Claire Boothe Luce: A Biography, which appeared in 1971. William F. Buckley Jr., described it as "favorable, but not gushy" and wrote that its "principal failure" was "that somehow it does not sufficiently communicate the flavor of her." Luce had given Shadegg access to her papers and press clippings, and he defended himself against suggestions that she exercised control over what he wrote and that he had not interviewed widely. Shadegg said that the "more romantic story" some wanted about the Republican icon would not have been accurate.

In 1972, he published The New How to Win an Election, which Jeff Greenfield called "staggeringly unreadable" and criticized for relying too closely on his earlier book, with its regional focus and Eisenhower-era issues and its lack of updated material. Others have found Shadegg's emphasis on developing networks of interpersonal communication, which he called social precincts, an early articulation of a strategy now widely recognized as important.

He collaborated with Goldwater on the latter's political memoir With No Apologies, which appeared in 1979. Following its publication by William Morrow & Company, the two successfully sued their original publisher Harcourt Brace Jovanovich for rejecting the manuscript after failing to respond to their requests for editorial assistance.

In 1986, he published a memoir: Arizona Politics: The Struggle to End One-Party Rule.

Shadegg's papers are held at the Arizona Historical Foundation in Tempe.

== Family and death ==
Shadegg married Eugenia Kerr, who died in 1988. They had four children, Stephen David Shadegg (1947–2009), who died of a heart attack while camping in the northern Arizona mountains, and John Barden Shadegg, Cynthia S. Ackel, and Eugenia S. Johnson, all born in Phoenix.

Stephen Shadegg died of cancer at his Phoenix home at the age of eighty on April 16, 1990. Younger son John Shadegg managed Arizona political campaigns as had his father, served as a U.S. representative from Arizona from 1995 to 2011, and then joined the staff of the Goldwater Institute in Phoenix.

== Bibliography ==
Fiction

- The Remnant: A Political Novel (Arlington House, 1968), ASIN B000SIAZFO

Non-fiction

- How to Win an Election: The Art of Political Victory (Taplinger, 1964), ASIN B0007DU2QC
- What Happened to Goldwater?: The Inside Story of the 1964 Republican Campaign (Holt, Rinehart, and Winston, 1965), ASIN B0006BN9HE
- Century One: 1869–1969 One Hundred Years of Water Development in the Salt River Valley (1969), ASIN B00FFIIMKC
- Winning's a Lot More Fun (Collier Macmillan, 1970), ISBN 978-0026096904
- Clare Booth Luce: A Biography (Simon & Schuster, 1970), ISBN 978-0856320170
- The New How to Win an Election (Taplinger, 1972), ISBN 978-0800855109
- Miss Lulu's Legacy (Arizona State University Press, 1984), ISBN 978-0961193218; the story of Lulu Clifton, a Methodist deaconess in the Salt River ill with tuberculosis, who established a hospital in a rented building in Phoenix
- Arizona Politics: The Struggle to End One-Party Rule (Arizona State University Press, 1986), ISBN 978-0961193263
