= Ken Bone (activist) =

American personality (born 1982)

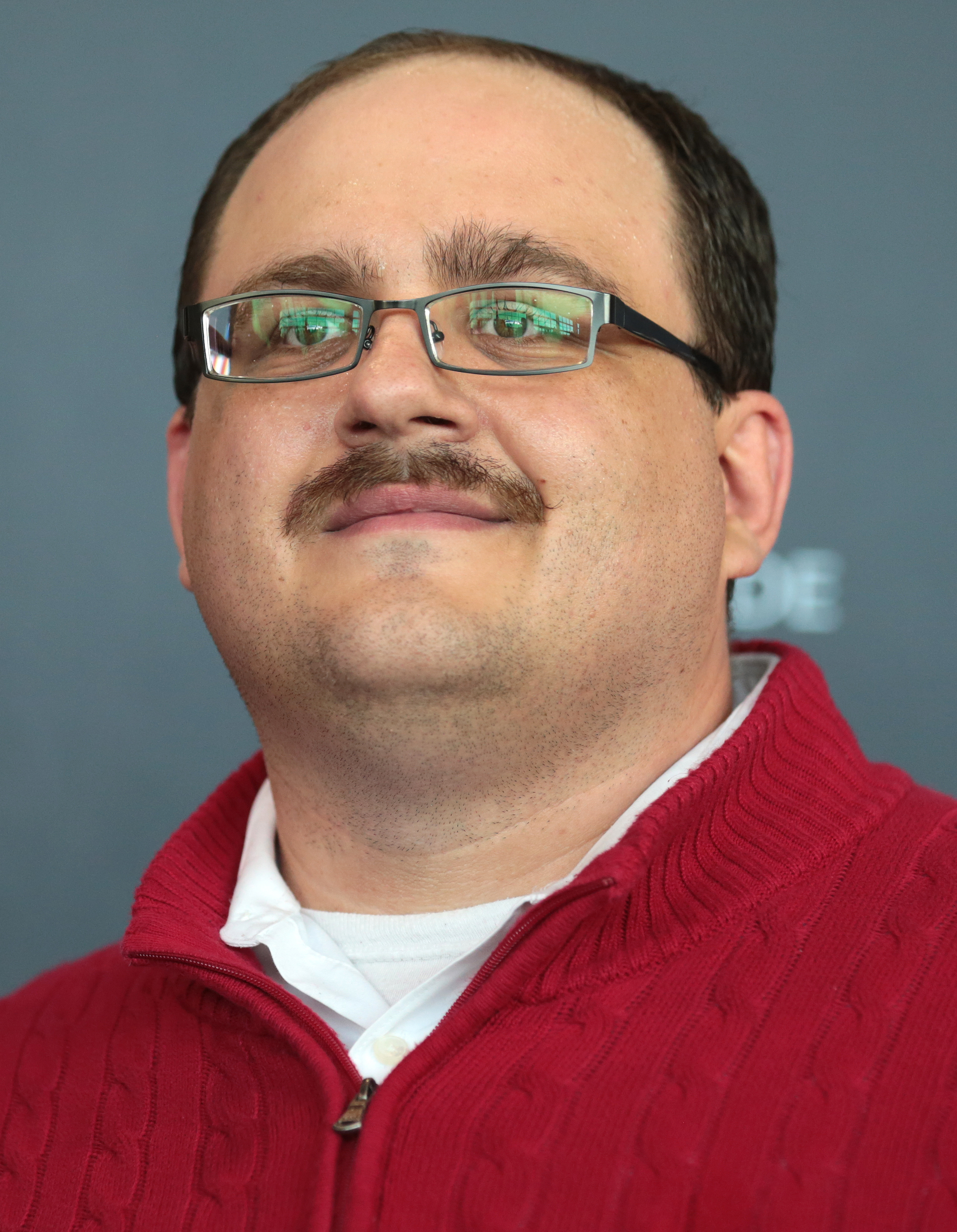
- Bone at the 2017 Conservative Political Action Conference (CPAC)
- Born: 1982 (age 43–44)
- Occupation: Power plant worker
- Known for: 2016 presidential debate appearance
- Children: 1

Kenneth Bone (born 1982) is an American power plant worker who became a viral phenomenon after asking a question as an undecided voter at the October 9 presidential debate during the 2016 United States election. Bone subsequently received national media attention and inspired a large number of Internet memes.

== 2016 election ==
At the October 9 presidential debate during the 2016 United States elections, Ken Bone, a coal power plant operator from Belleville, Illinois, was one of several local undecided voters invited to participate in the debate between Democratic nominee Hillary Clinton and Republican nominee Donald Trump. Bone asked the question:

What steps will your energy policy take to meet our energy needs while at the same time remaining environmentally friendly and minimizing job loss for fossil power plant workers?

Bone quickly became a viral sensation on social media, immediately gaining over 80,000 followers on Twitter after the debate. Multiple parody and fan pages were created under his name on various platforms. Bone's red sweater, use of a disposable camera before and after the debate, and general demeanor was received positively by viewers of the event, and spawned numerous Internet memes. Bone maintained that he would remain an undecided voter after the debate. He ultimately voted for Clinton in the 2016 presidential election.

After the debate, Bone made appearances on Jimmy Kimmel Live!, @midnight, and ESPN College GameDay. Bone was also parodied on Saturday Night Live and The Ellen DeGeneres Show. Bone capitalized on his sudden fame by endorsing ridesharing company Uber with a tweet, filming a commercial for Izod, and partnering with merchandise company Represent to market T-shirts. An emoji with Bone's likeness was briefly available on Twitter, and would appear whenever the hashtag #MyVote2016 was used. Bone also auctioned off the red sweater he wore during the debate, raising $10,000 for the charity Greater St. Louis Honor Flight.

On October 13, 2016, Bone hosted a Reddit AMA under the username "StanGibson18". After the post went live, Bone received backlash for comments he previously made using his personal account regarding the 2014 celebrity nude photo leak and killing of Trayvon Martin. As a result of the media attention, Bone was also swatted and received threats directed at him and his family.

== Post-election ==
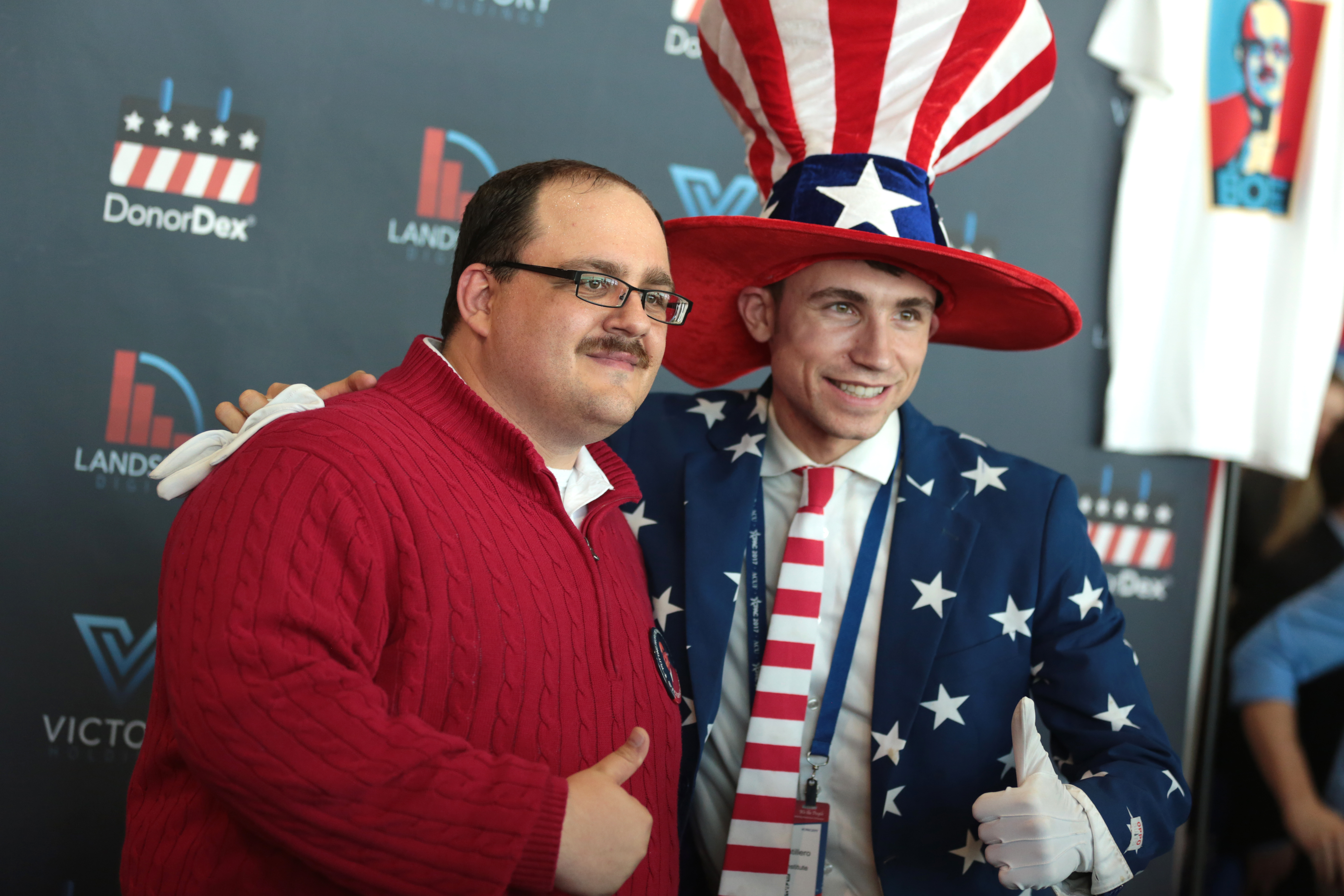
Bone with an attendee at the 2017 Conservative Political Action Conference

Bone continued to make public appearances related to United States politics after the 2016 election, appearing on Real Time with Bill Maher and at the 2017 Conservative Political Action Conference. Since 2016, Bone expressed dissatisfaction towards the Trump administration, first implying that he would likely vote for Joe Biden in the 2020 presidential election and later endorsing Andrew Yang. Bone voted for Libertarian Party nominee Jo Jorgensen in the 2020 election. He was the subject of an October 2020 New Yorker documentary, in which he reflects on the 2016 election and the effect fame had on his life. In October 2026, Bone revealed that he had voted for Kamala Harris in the 2024 presidential election, explaining that his previous vote for Jorgensen had been a protest vote.

8 days before the midterm elections in November 2026, Bone criticised the Republican party for focusing too much on trans people, mental hospital hoaxes, Cheesecake Factory and Islamophobia.

== Personal life ==
Bone is married and has a son.
