= Roger Clyne and the Peacemakers =

American rock band from Tempe, Arizona

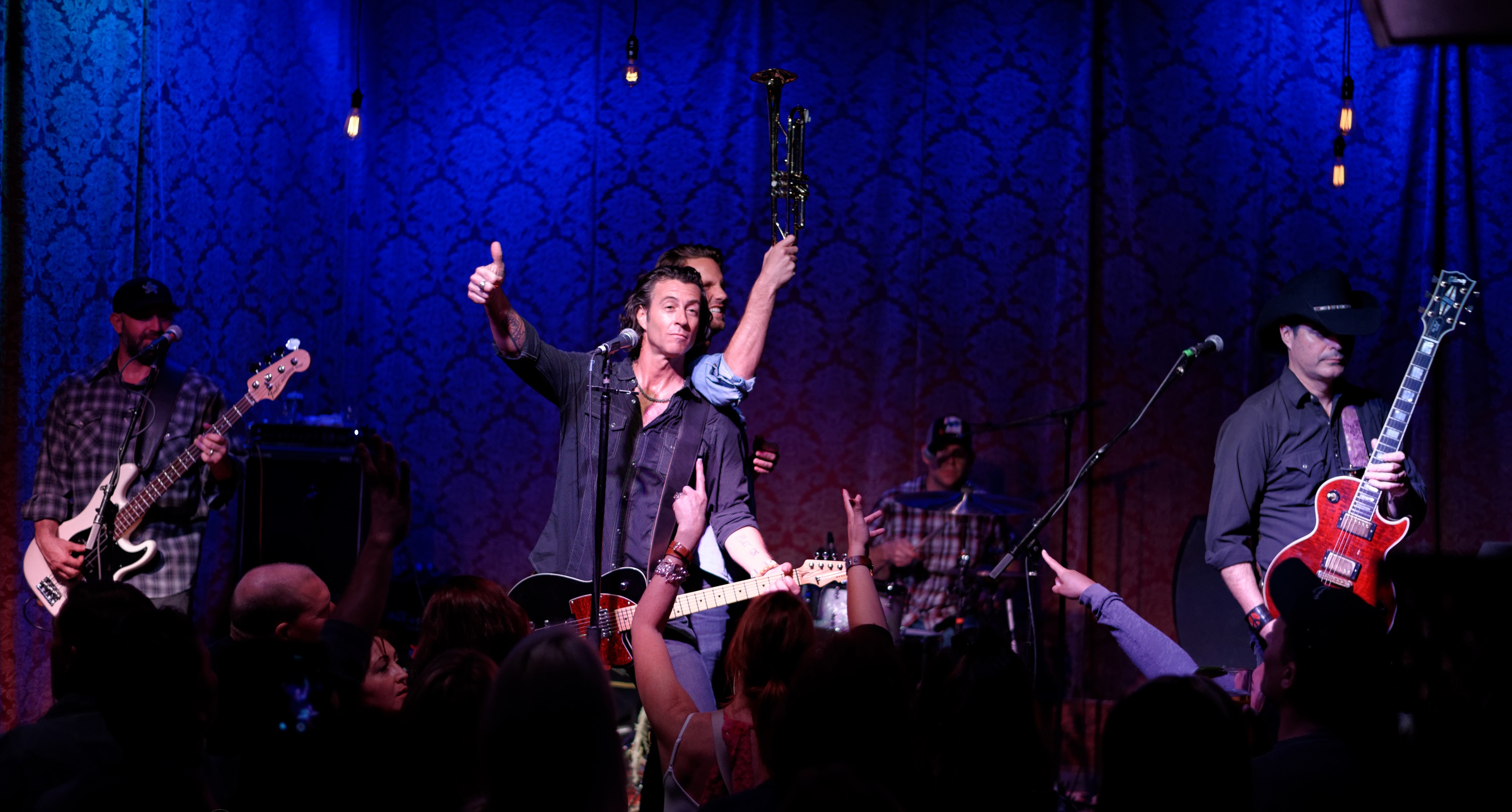
- Roger Clyne and the Peacemakers at Saint Rocke in 2015

Background information
- Spinoff of: The Refreshments
- Members: Roger Clyne; P.H. Naffah; Jim Dalton; Nick Scropos
- Website: www.rogerclyneandthepeacemakers.com

Roger Clyne and the Peacemakers is an American rock band.

== History ==
Roger Clyne and the Peacemakers (at that time just The Peacemakers) formed in 1998, following the removal of Brian Blush and departure of Art Edwards from the Refreshments.

In early 2004, shortly after the release of ¡Americano!, bassist Danny White left the band to start his own recording studio in Nashville, Tennessee. He was replaced by Nick Scropos, who had been the bassist for another Tempe band, Gloritone.

In 2007, the Arizona Diamondbacks reached out to Roger Clyne and the Peacemakers to write a song for the team. The result, the "D-Backs Swing," is played in the stadium after every home game win, and the lyrics are used in advertisements.

The band debuted their own brand of tequila in 2011. It was named "Mexican Moonshine", after the band's own song of the same name, but was rebranded in 2021 to "Canción Tequila" to avoid the negative connotations of the word "moonshine".

Roger Clyne and the Peacemakers frequently tour the United States and host their own seaside music festival in Puerto Peñasco. In June 2019, they celebrated the 20th year of their official Circus Mexicus festival.

On July 2, 2019 Roger Clyne and the Peacemakers was inducted into the Arizona Music and Entertainment Hall of Fame. The event was held at the Tempe Center for the Arts.

== Band members ==
- Roger Clyne - Rhythm Guitar, Lead Vocals (1998 - present)
- Paul "P.H." Naffah - Drums, Backing Vocals (1998 - present)
- Nick Scropos - Bass, Backing Vocals (2004 - present)
- Jim Dalton - Lead Guitar, Backing Vocals (2009 - present)

Former Members

- Danny White - Bass, Backing Vocals (1998 - 2004)
- Steve Larson - Lead Guitar, Backing Vocals (2002 - 2009)
- Scott Johnson - Lead Guitar, Backing Vocals (1998 - 2002)

== Discography ==
Studio Albums

- Honky Tonk Union (1999)
- Sonoran Hope and Madness (2002)
- ¡Americano! (2004)
- No More Beautiful World (2007)
- Turbo Ocho (2008)
- Unida Cantina (2011)
- The Independent (2014)
- Native Heart (2017)
- Hell to Breakfast (2026)

Live Albums

- Real to Reel (2000)
- Live at Billy Bob's, Texas (2005)
- Glow In The Dark (2009)
- Circus Mexicus XX (2013)
