= Fizzy Fuzzy Big & Buzzy =

Studio album by The Refreshments
- Released: February 27, 1996
- Recorded: Winter 1995 - January 1996
- Genres: Alternative rock, pop
- Length: 53:27
- Label: Mercury
- Producer: Clif Norrell

The Refreshments chronology
Wheelie (1994)	Fizzy Fuzzy Big & Buzzy (1996)	The Bottle & Fresh Horses (1997)

Fizzy Fuzzy Big & Buzzy is an album by the American band the Refreshments, released in 1996. Many of the tracks are re-recordings of songs from their debut, Wheelie, which saw a limited release. The album title is an homage to the Who's Meaty Beaty Big and Bouncy.

The album sold more than 60,000 copies in its first four months of release. Its first single was "Banditos", which was a rock radio hit; the second single was "Down Together". The band supported the album by touring with Seven Mary Three.

Fizzy Fuzzy Big & Buzzy was issued on vinyl in 2015.

== Production ==
This album was a re-recorded version of their 1995 release Wheelie. Only two tracks were cut; a cover of Cheap Trick's Come On, Come On and a track titled "Psychosis," while new tracks emerged, namely "Blue Collar Suicide" and "Interstate," with what was initially the track "B.O.B.A" renamed "Mexico".

== Critical reception ==
Professional ratings
Review scores
Source	Rating
AllMusic	4/5 stars
Calgary Herald	3.5/5 stars

The Vancouver Sun wrote: "Starchy, middle-of-the-road, radio-friendly, four-piece pop, Fizzy Fuzzy Big and Buzzy is entirely inoffensive—even fleetingly catchy." The Calgary Herald thought that "while Fizzy Fuzzy Big & Buzzy goes down a little flat in parts, most of it is a sparkling affair of songs whose melodies are delightfully down-home, electric geetar-driven and whose characters play out their feelings and lives in bars and beneath the stars in memorable fashion."

The Chicago Tribune deemed the album "truly mediocre bar band rock."

AllMusic wrote that "all the anguished grunge and post-grunge posing got old fast—and with clever lyrics, solidly melodic guitar work, and Roger Clyne's marketable voice, the Refreshments kept fun alive on the alternative scene throughout the decade's latter half."

== Track listing ==
All songs written by Roger Clyne and Paul "P.H." Naffah, except where noted.

1. "Blue Collar Suicide" – 3:35
2. "European Swallow" – 4:32
3. "Down Together" – 4:23
4. "Mekong" – 4:34
5. "Don't Wanna Know" – 4:42
6. "Girly" – 3:58
7. "Banditos" – 4:17
8. "Mexico" (Clyne, Naffah, Edwards) – 4:00
9. "Interstate" (Clyne, Naffah, Edwards) – 5:39
10. "Suckerpunch" (Clyne, Naffah, Edwards) – 3:39
11. "Carefree" (Clyne, Naffah, Edwards) – 3:41
12. "Nada" (Clyne, Naffah, Edwards) – 6:27

== Supporting Tour ==
The Refreshments began the promoting tour on March 15, 1996 at the Town Lake Stage in Austin, Texas as a part of the SXSW festival for music promotion.
