= Dead Hot Workshop =

American rock band

- Origin: Tempe, Arizona
- Genres: rock
- Members: Brent Babb; Curtis Grippe; Kylie Babb; Thomas Laufenberg
- Past members: Steve Larson; Brian Griffith; Scott Palmer; Chris Whitehouse

Dead Hot Workshop is an American rock band based in Tempe, Arizona.

The band was a popular fixture of the Tempe music scene in the 1990s, when Tempe was being dubbed as "The Next Seattle" by music reps, and as a region that would produce many new, talented bands that would be ripe for national discovery. The band got their start at a Tempe club named Long Wong's, which at the time was at the center of downtown Tempe's music scene and the starting point for bands such as the Gin Blossoms, The Refreshments and The Pistoleros, who all (including Dead Hot Workshop) signed with major record labels in the 1990s. During the mid-1990s, the band toured using a used 1992 van named "Sugar", that the Gin Blossoms had taken on tour ten times before Dead Hot Workshop acquired it. The band released its album White House and then EP River Otis in 1994.

In 1995 Dead Hot Workshop released 1001, their first album produced by a major record label. Even though they were considered to be in the shadow of the Gin Blossoms, the album was reviewed to have a "gritty, sandblasted edge" that the Gin Blossoms were missing. The music was described as having a mix of country, folk and rock influences from artists such as Neil Young, Allman Brothers, Bob Dylan, Johnny Cash and Waylon Jennings, while maintaining its "90s garage-band relevance". The album contains fourteen tracks, including "Burger Christ", "Choad", "I Dream of David", "117", "Bob Hill Climbin'", "A", and "Jesus Revisited".

Houston Press rated the album 1001 four out of five stars. Allmusic reviewer Tim Griggs rated it three out of five.

In 2005 1001 was included in the East Valley Tribune's Top 25 albums by Valley Bands, a list that included albums from bands such as The Refreshments, Jimmy Eat World, the Gin Blossoms and the Meat Puppets. In 2006, 1001 was listed as one of the "Top 25 albums by Valley bands", calling singer and songwriter Brent Babb the "Poet Laureate of Mill Avenue", and the album explained why there were so many literature majors from Arizona State University hanging out at Dead Hot Workshop shows during the peak of Mill Avenue's music scene in the 1990s.

In 2019 the band was inducted into the Arizona Music and Entertainment Hall of Fame. The band performed a set and was joined by past members Steven Larson and Brian Griffith.

== Members ==
- Steve Larson (until 1995)
- Brent Babb
- Brian Griffith (until 2005)
- Scott Palmer (until 1988)
- Curtis Grippe (replaced Palmer in 1989)
- Kylie Babb
- Thomas Laufenberg

== Discography ==
- White House (1994)
- River Otis (1994)
- 1001 (1995)
- 101: An Introduction To The Band (1995)
- Old Favorites & New Ones Too (1997)
- Karma Covered Apple (1998)
- Heavy Meadow (2006)
