= Turbo Ocho =

Studio album by Roger Clyne and the Peacemakers
- Released: April 29, 2008
- Genre: Southern rock
- Length: 41
- Label: Emma Java
- Producer: Clif Norrell

Roger Clyne and the Peacemakers chronology
No More Beautiful World (2007)	Turbo Ocho (2008)	'Glow in the Dark' (2009)

Turbo Ocho is the fifth studio album released by Roger Clyne and the Peacemakers. It was released on April 29, 2008.

== Background ==
January 4, 2008, Roger Clyne & the Peacemakers started an eight consecutive day audio/video chronicle. A revolutionary reality-recording experiment where the band and crew set up a studio in a seaside home in Rocky Point, Mexico and broadcast daily audio and video episodes of a song a day to thousands of fans back home in the United States. They created and shared, from inspiration to the final mix, 8 songs in 8 days. Three more fan favorites were added to the song lineup for the final physical release two months later.

== Critical reception ==
Andrew Leahey of AllMusic rated it four out of five stars.

== Track listing ==
1. "I Speak Your Language" - 2:58
2. "State of the Art" - 3:50
3. "I Know You Know" - 2:45
4. "Summer Number 39" - 3:25
5. "Mercy" - 3:24
6. "I Can Drink the Water" -6:02
7. "I Do" - 3:40
8. "Persephone" - 3:22
9. "Manana" - 3:47
10. "Captain Suburbia" - 4:06
11. "Mexicosis" - 3:51
