= Paul "P.H." Naffah =

American drummer

Paul "P.H." Naffah is best known as the former drummer for the Refreshments. He is now the drummer for Roger Clyne and the Peacemakers, the band he created with fellow Refreshment Roger Clyne.

== Biography ==
=== Early years ===
Called the "calmest, low maintenance guy I know," by frontman Roger Clyne, Naffah prefers to slip behind his drum set for concerts, and then disappear into the shadows once the night is done. His set-up is unorthodox with a cymbal layout that pushes outward towards the audience and a stiff-armed match grip.

A native of Chicago, Naffah began drumming after receiving a drum set for Christmas when he was 11 or 12. What started as a boyhood hobby became a drumming passion as he methodically taught himself the craft using a jukebox of 45s in his family's basement as his "instructors." Naffah mimicked the songs’ percussion parts until he mastered more and more complex combinations and beats. Patterning himself after drummers of the 1970s and 1980s (Keith Moon, John Bonham, and Stewart Copeland), he also found inspiration in lesser-known drummers including Mark Kingsmill of Hoodoo Gurus and Benny "Papasita" Benjamin who was part of the Motown rhythm section. By age 15, Naffah was in a band and because he was underage, had to be smuggled in to play a variety of Chicago clubs. The band played original music and Naffah quickly became attuned to the nuances of working with songwriters.

=== Early music career ===
At age 18, Naffah moved to Arizona to attend Arizona State University. During school, he drummed for local bands and met a string of musicians that performed in the vibrant local scene. At a party he had a fleeting and impromptu jam with the Mortals and their lead vocalist, Roger Clyne.

=== The Refreshments ===
After graduation in 1993, he left the band scene, took his MCATs and passed the time building cabinets for a Phoenix contractor. He rarely followed the local bands but was aware of buzz surrounding the Refreshments, a group which included Clyne and Naffah's friend, guitarist Brian Blush. In 1995, Blush called Naffah, inviting him to audition for the band's then-open drummer slot. Naffah decided that a career in medicine could wait and he joined the band. Signed by Mercury months later, the Refreshments grew from garage band to an early contender in the post-grunge landscape. Their first label album from 1996 to 1997 was the well-received Fizzy Fuzzy Big & Buzzy, which spawned two radio hits, "Banditos" and "Down Together". New management was installed at the Mercury label and despite another noteworthy album, The Bottle and Fresh Horses, the Refreshments were released from their recording contract.

=== Roger Clyne and the Peacemakers ===
Naffah and Clyne soon after began playing Phoenix-area happy hours as a twosome. Jamming with a series of guitarists and bassists, they formed Roger Clyne and the Peacemakers in 1999.

Naffah's role with Roger Clyne and the Peacemakers expanded and he co-produced the first three albums, Honky Tonk Union, Real to Reel, and Sonoran Hope and Madness. Naffah is usually the first to hear the vocalist's original compositions and lyrics. Clyne was present when Naffah and White recorded the bass parts for ¡Americano!.

In 2019, Roger Clyne and the Peacemakers were inducted to the Arizona Music and Entertainment Hall of Fame.
