= Roger Clyne =

American singer

Roger Meade Clyne
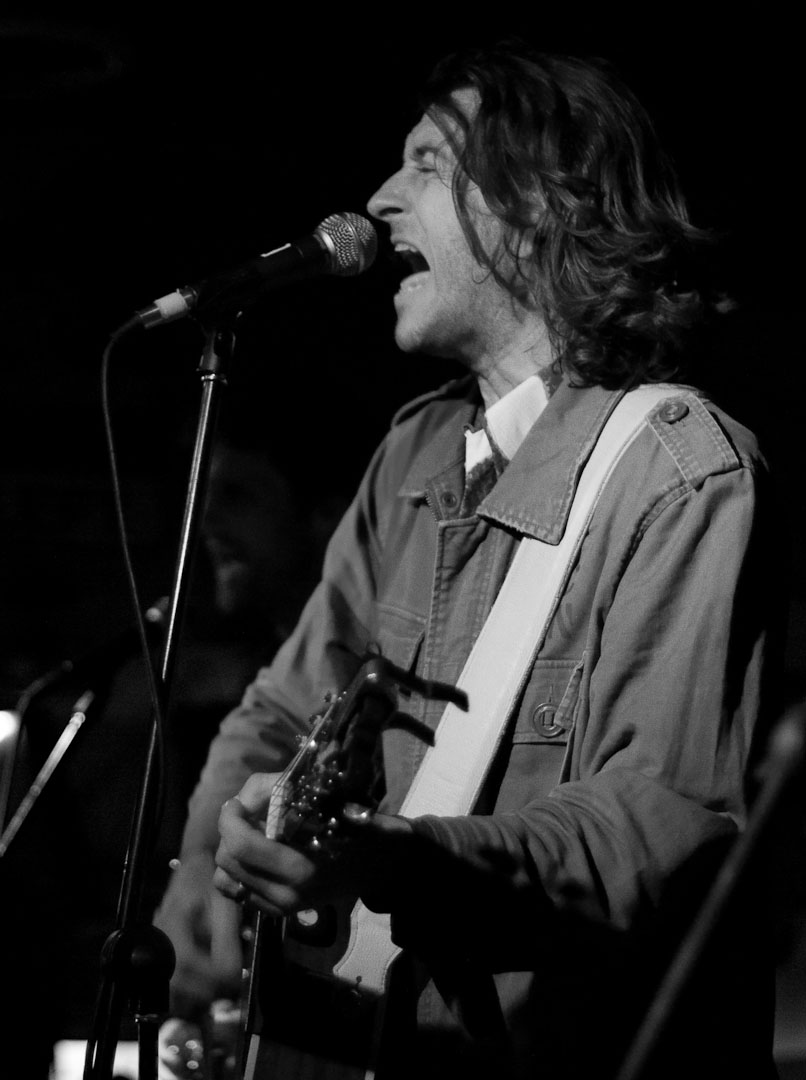

Background information
- Born: Roger Meade Clyne; January 13, 1968 (age 58); Tucson, Arizona
- Origin: Tucson, Arizona
- Genres: Rock, Americana, classic rock
- Occupations: Singer, songwriter
- Instruments: Vocals, guitar, harmonica, kazoo
- Years active: 1992–present
- Label: Emma Java
- Website: http://www.azpeacemakers.com/

Roger Meade Clyne (born January 13, 1968) is an American singer, songwriter, and musician. He is currently the lead singer, primary songwriter, and rhythm guitar player for the American rock band Roger Clyne and the Peacemakers. His previous bands include The Refreshments and the Mortals.

His musical career has spanned three decades, including several hits with The Refreshments and penning the theme song for the animated television series King of the Hill. He wrote and recorded the victory song for his hometown Major League Baseball club, the Arizona Diamondbacks, entitled "The D-Backs Swing".

Much of Clyne's music throughout his career revolves around life in Arizona and Sonora, Mexico. He was born in Tucson and grew up in Tempe, where he balanced life as a suburban kid while visiting his grandparents' ranch in southern Arizona, where he rode horses, herded cattle and fixed fences.

As a youth and young adult, his frequent trips to Mexico have influenced his music. Clyne attended college at Arizona State University, where he played with several bands.

While at ASU, he did a Spanish immersion class and lived with a family in Ensenada, Mexico. During that stay, he also did an ethnography for Anthropology credit of his choice of subject, mariachis. This meant Clyne would follow them around town and interview them while buying them beers and gaining their trust.

Every album that Clyne has written for both The Refreshments and RCPM has had mariachi horns on it. His love of a beach town on the Sea of Cortez in Sonora, Mexico called Puerto Peñasco (Rocky Point) came through when he decided to have his band play there for a concert in 2000. What began as a one-night, one-band concert there grew into what is now a four-day annual music festival named Circus Mexicus. The event brings over 5,000 people, and two events, the Hot Dog & a Smile and the Rock & Beach Soccer tournament, both raise money for charities based in Rocky Point.

Roger Clyne and the Peacemakers (also known as RCPM) released their eighth full-length studio album, Native Heart, on June 30, 2017.

Clyne owns his own tour bus and tours all over the United States every year. His other interests include his own brand of ultra-premium tequila, named Roger Clyne's Mexican Moonshine Tequila, which was renamed Canción in 2021.

He is part owner of a bar in Puerto Peñasco called Banditos.

Clyne and his wife, Alisa Nicole Clyne, live in Tempe; they have three children.

== Discography ==
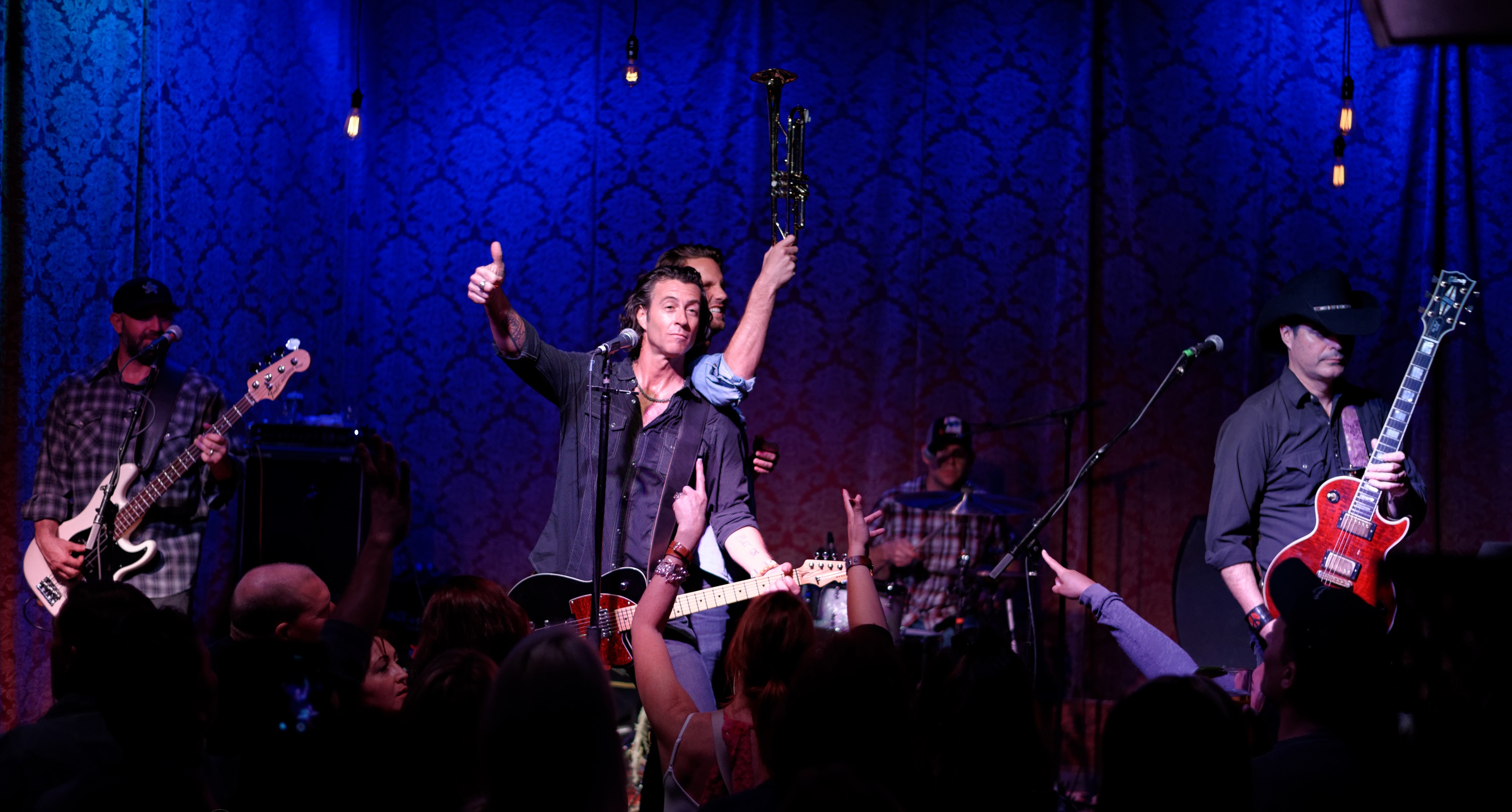
Roger Clyne and The Peacemakers at Saint Rocke in 2015

- Wheelie (1994) (with The Refreshments)
- Fizzy Fuzzy Big & Buzzy (1996) (with The Refreshments)
- The Bottle & Fresh Horses (1997) (with The Refreshments)
- Honky Tonk Union (1999)
- Real to Reel (2000) (Live)
- Sonoran Hope and Madness (2002)
- ¡Americano! (2004)
- Live at Billy Bob's Texas (2005)
- Four Unlike Before (2006) (EP)
- No More Beautiful World (2007)
- Turbo Ocho (2008)
- Glow in the Dark (2009) (Live)
- Unida Cantina (2011)
- The Independent (2014)
- Native Heart (2017)
- Live at the Belly Up (2017)

== Cultural impact ==
In the 2011 novel Donations to Clarity by Noah Baird (published by Second Wind Publishing), two characters were named after Roger Clyne: newscaster Echo Clyne and her cameraman Roger.

In 2016, Popmotion Pictures created a documentary of The Refreshments to celebrate their first album, Fizzy Fuzzy Big & Buzzy, turning 20 years old. Named Here's to Life, the documentary was released in March 2017 and featured in the Phoenix Film Festival.

== Soundtracks ==
- An American Werewolf in Paris 1997 "Psychosis" (as The Refreshments)
- King of the Hill theme song - "Yahoos and Triangles" (as The Refreshments)
