= The Refreshments (American band) =

American alternative rock band

- Origin: Tempe, Arizona, U.S.
- Genres: Alternative rock; roots rock
- Years active: 1993–1999; 2010; 2013; 2016; 2021
- Label: Mercury
- Spinoffs: Roger Clyne & The Peacemakers
- Spinoff of: The Mortals
- Past members: Roger Clyne; Paul "P.H." Naffah; Arthur Eugene "Buddy" Edwards; Brian David Blush; Dusty Denham
- Website: https://therefreshments.com

The Refreshments were an alternative rock band from Tempe, Arizona. The band is best known for the single "Banditos" from their 1996 breakthrough album Fizzy Fuzzy Big & Buzzy, and also for "Yahoos and Triangles", the theme song to the long-running animated series King of the Hill. The Refreshments changed their name in 1998 to Roger Clyne and the Peacemakers, with Roger Clyne and P.H. Naffah continuing to tour and play Refreshments songs.

== History ==
=== Background ===
Originally The Mortals in 1992, Roger Clyne and Dustin "Dusty" Denham wanted to continue playing after that band dissolved. They formed The Refreshments in early 1993 and had considered names like "Pop Enema" and "All You Can Eat" before settling on a more conventional name. The original lineup consisted of Clyne (lead vocals, rhythm guitar, harmonica, kazoo), Brian David Blush (lead guitar, backing vocals), Art Edwards (bass guitar, backing vocals), and Denham (drums, percussion, backing vocals). Blush came from a band called August Red, while Denham and Edwards had played together for a short time in a band called the Hanson Brothers.

In one year the band went from opening for such powerhouse local bands as Dead Hot Workshop and the Gin Blossoms to headlining and packing venues five nights a week. They played in a local Ticketmaster showcase in their hometown of Tempe, AZ and came out the victors. They were then flown to Seattle to perform in the regional showcase and they were again the victors. The national showcase competition culminated at the Hollywood Palladium in Los Angeles in the fall of that year and, The Refreshments were the champions, winning $10,000 in recording time at Bad Animals Studios in Seattle. The band recorded songs at Bad Animals and kept the recordings for future use. The songs were later stolen and leaked online without the band's permission. The Refreshments applied for entry and performed at South by Southwest on March 15, 1996, in Austin, Texas, and were signed to Mercury Records; as a result as well as with manager, Michael Lustig. In 1995, original drummer Dustin "Dusty" Denham departed, and was replaced by Paul "P.H." Naffah, who had played in a local band called Rain Convention.

The Refreshments recorded their first record in the summer of 1995 and it was released on February 27, 1996, under the title Fizzy Fuzzy Big & Buzzy. The band hit the number one spot on Billboard's Heatseekers list with the single "Banditos" and toured throughout the U.S. "Banditos" peaked at No. 9 on the Billboard Alternative Rock charts and crossed over into the Hot 100. The band was slated to leave for an Australian tour in the late fall, but it was canceled by the new president of Mercury Records, and the band members were told to record their second album. Their second album, The Bottle & Fresh Horses, was recorded in early 1997 and it was released in the fall of 1997. There was no financial or promotional support from Mercury to promote a single at radio, no support for a tour, but they continued onward. Mercury Records let the band's recording contract lapse in early 1998. The Refreshments sold 10,000 units in December 1997, their last month with the label.

The second Refreshments album, 1997's The Bottle & Fresh Horses, spent one week on the chart. The band exited its deal with Mercury around the time Blush's drug problem peaked. In 1998, the band could no longer tolerate his substance use, and Blush was removed from the band. Blush pawned his publishing rights for both "King of the Hill" and the Refreshments catalog to Roger Clyne.

Roger Clyne had toyed around with what he called a spaghetti western rave up and when Manager, Michael Lustig, told him to turn something in for a Mike Judge cartoon in the works, he offered up what he would name "Yahoos and Triangles." For the recording of it, the band was on tour and told the crowd during a show they were going to play something for them and to cheer at the end of it for the recording...unknown to Clyne, the sound engineer included his prodding of the audience in the recording and gave the band the piece from the soundboard to turn in...a week later Clyne received a call with his manager and others on the line. They started in on Clyne for prodding the audience and "how dare you try and trick us with fake crowd cheers", silence ensued for a full minute with Clyne thinking he blew it, until the two others on the line followed the chastising with, "Just kiddin' man, we love it!"

The band was known for its "Southwestern sound", similar to other bands hailing from Arizona such as the Sidewinders, Gin Blossoms, the Meat Puppets and Dead Hot Workshop. The group had two charting singles, both from 1996's Fizzy Fuzzy Big & Buzzy (both written by Roger Clyne): "Banditos" (U.S. Mainstream Rock No. 11, Modern Rock No. 14), and "Down Together" (Modern Rock No. 38).

=== Current ===
Lead vocalist, rhythm guitarist, and primary songwriter Roger Clyne and drummer Paul "P.H." Naffah renamed the group Roger Clyne and the Peacemakers in 1998, and still perform most of the Refreshments songs live in concert. Clyne & The Peacemakers have released eight studio albums, two live albums and a live DVD of their annual music festival, Circus Mexicus, in Puerto Peñasco, Mexico. They also went on to form a close relationship with the Major League Baseball team the Arizona Diamondbacks, writing/performing the team's theme song, "The D-Back's Swing". The band has also performed concerts for the team after ballgames at Chase Field and other various team events.

Art Edwards is now a writer, and self-published his novels Stuck Outside of Phoenix and Ghost Notes, with another, Badge, released in early 2014. Stuck Outside of Phoenix was made into a full-length feature film which premiered May 2, 2013. It was produced by Nico Holthaus and directed by Dean Mongan, and stars Brandon Hannifin.

In March 2013, Roger, PH and Brian re-united and performed as the Refreshments to a raucous crowd at the Circus Mexicus Music Festival in June 2013. Once again, Roger, PH and Brian played at Circus Mexicus in 2016, to celebrate the 20th anniversary of Fizzy Fuzzy Big & Buzzy.

In 2017, the documentary film titled Here's To Life – The Story of the Refreshments was released on digital/DVD/Blu-ray. The film chronicles the group's beginnings as a bar band, their rise to fame on a major label and issues within the band and the music industry that led to their sudden end.

On February 27, 2021 to commemorate the 25th anniversary of Fizzy Fuzzy Big & Buzzy, Roger and PH invited Brian (Edwards declined) and played a live streamed performance of the album in its entirety.

== Band members ==
Former members

- Dusty Denham – drums, percussion, backing vocals (1992–1995)
- Arthur Eugene "Buddy" Edwards – bass guitar, backing vocals (1993–1998)
- Brian David Blush – lead guitar, backing vocals (1993–1998, 2010, 2013, 2016)

Current Lineup

- Roger Clyne – lead vocals, rhythm guitar, harmonica, kazoo (1992–present)
- Paul "P.H." Naffah – drums, percussion, backing vocals (1995–present)
- Nick Scropos – bass guitar, backing vocals
- Jim Dalton – lead guitar, backing vocals

== Discography ==
=== Studio albums ===
- Wheelie (self-released, 1994)
- Fizzy Fuzzy Big & Buzzy (Mercury Records, 1996)
- The Bottle & Fresh Horses (Mercury Records, 1997)

=== EPs ===
- Lo, Our Much Praised Yet Not Altogether Satisfactory Lady (1995)

=== Demos ===
- Seattle Demos (1994)

=== Singles ===
Title	Year	Peak chart positions				Album
Title	Year	US Mod	AUS	CAN	CAN Alt	Album
"Banditos"	1996	14	56	20	13	Fizzy Fuzzy Big & Buzzy
"Down Together"	1996	38	—	—	—	Fizzy Fuzzy Big & Buzzy
"Girly"	1996	—	—	—	—	Fizzy Fuzzy Big & Buzzy
"Good Year"	1997	—	—	—	—	The Bottle & Fresh Horses
"Wanted"	1998	—	—	—	—	The Bottle & Fresh Horses
"Yahoos and Triangles"	1999	—	—	—	—	
