= National Register of Historic Places listings in St. Clair County, Illinois =

Location of St. Clair County in Illinois

This is a list of the National Register of Historic Places listings in St. Clair County, Illinois.

This is intended to be a complete list of the properties and districts on the National Register of Historic Places in St. Clair County, Illinois, United States. Latitude and longitude coordinates are provided for many National Register properties and districts; these locations may be seen together in a map.

There are 30 properties and districts listed on the National Register in the county, including 4 National Historic Landmarks. Another property was once listed but has been removed.

This National Park Service list is complete through NPS recent listings posted December 12, 2025.

== Current listings ==
	Name on the Register	Image	Date listed	Location	City or town	Description
1	Belleville Historic District	Belleville Historic District	November 7, 1976 (#76002165)	Between E, S. Belt, Illinois, and Forest Sts. 38°30′40″N 89°58′44″W	Belleville	
2	Berger-Kiel House	Berger-Kiel House	August 12, 1999 (#99000977)	931 N. 6th St. 38°30′00″N 89°48′28″W	Mascoutah	
3	Blair Historic District	Blair Historic District	August 18, 2015 (#15000523)	Parts of 1st, 2nd, 3rd, A, B, High, Illinois, Main, and Washington Sts. 38°30′49″N 89°59′13″W	Belleville	
4	Broadview Hotel	Broadview Hotel	December 31, 2013 (#13001006)	415 E. Broadway; 38°37′29″N 90°09′39″W	East St. Louis	
5	Cahokia Mounds	Cahokia Mounds	October 15, 1966 (#66000899)	7850 Collinsville Rd., Cahokia Mounds State Park; 38°39′12″N 90°03′52″W	Collinsville	World Heritage Site. Extends into Madison County
6	Church of the Holy Family	Church of the Holy Family	April 15, 1970 (#70000851)	E. 1st St. 38°34′11″N 90°11′18″W	Cahokia	
7	Curtiss-Wright Hangars 1 and 2	Curtiss-Wright Hangars 1 and 2	June 14, 2007 (#06001024)	2200 Vector Dr., 2300 Vector Dr. 38°34′37″N 90°09′58″W	Cahokia	
8	George Draser Jr. Houses	George Draser Jr. Houses	May 11, 2000 (#00000474)	48 and 52 W. Main St. 38°29′24″N 89°47′59″W	Mascoutah	
9	Downtown East St. Louis Historic District	Downtown East St. Louis Historic District	September 17, 2014 (#14000622)	Portions of Collinsville, Missouri, and St. Louis Aves. 38°37′38″N 90°09′32″W	East St. Louis	
10	Eads Bridge	Eads Bridge	October 15, 1966 (#66000946)	Spanning the Mississippi River at Washington St. 38°37′41″N 90°10′17″W	East St. Louis	Connects to St. Louis, Missouri
11	Emerald Mound and Village Site	Emerald Mound and Village Site	October 26, 1971 (#71001026)	Northwest of the junction of Emerald Mound Grange and Midgley Neiss Rd. 38°37′51″N 89°47′04″W	Lebanon	
12	Hotel Belleville	Hotel Belleville	June 20, 2018 (#100002574)	16 S Illinois St. 38°30′47″N 89°59′03″W	Belleville	
13	Nicholas Jarrot Mansion	Nicholas Jarrot Mansion	November 19, 1974 (#74002197)	124 E. First St. 38°34′12″N 90°11′15″W	Cahokia	
14	Knobeloch-Seibert Farm	Knobeloch-Seibert Farm	May 9, 1983 (#83004186)	Eastern side of Schneider Rd., south of its junction with Illinois Routes 158 and 177; 38°29′54″N 89°51′44″W	Belleville	
15	Gustave Koerner House	Gustave Koerner House	September 17, 2004 (#04000983)	200 Abend St. 38°30′48″N 89°58′40″W	Belleville	
16	Lebanon Historic District	Lebanon Historic District	October 4, 1978 (#78003113)	Irregular pattern centered along St. Louis and Belleville Sts. 38°36′06″N 89°48′58″W	Lebanon	
17	Lunsford-Pulcher Archeological Site	Lunsford-Pulcher Archeological Site	July 23, 1973 (#73000712)	Western side of Oklahoma Hill Rd. 38°29′40″N 90°13′52″W	Columbia	Extends into Monroe County
18	Majestic Theatre	Majestic Theatre	May 9, 1985 (#85000977)	240-246 Collinsville Ave. 38°37′38″N 90°09′28″W	East St. Louis	
19	Marissa Academy	Marissa Academy	October 28, 1994 (#94001267)	610 S. Main St. 38°14′27″N 89°45′16″W	Marissa	
20	Pierre Martin House	Pierre Martin House	February 9, 1990 (#89002350)	First St. at Old Route 3; 38°32′50″N 90°11′55″W	North Dupo	
21	Mermaid House Hotel	Mermaid House Hotel	December 4, 1975 (#75002078)	114 E. St. Louis St. 38°36′13″N 89°48′23″W	Lebanon	
22	Old Cahokia Courthouse	Old Cahokia Courthouse	November 9, 1972 (#72001480)	Corner of W. 1st and Elm Sts. 38°34′15″N 90°11′30″W	Cahokia	
23	Pennsylvania Avenue Historic District	Pennsylvania Avenue Historic District	July 27, 1979 (#79003166)	Pennsylvania Ave. 38°37′42″N 90°08′39″W	East St. Louis	
24	Rutter Store	Rutter Store	May 6, 1994 (#94000436)	7346 Illinois Route 15; 38°21′50″N 89°42′48″W	St. Libory	
25	Scott Field Historic District	Scott Field Historic District	March 10, 1994 (#94000060)	Roughly bounded by Scott Dr. and Hanger Rd. 38°32′22″N 89°51′46″W	O'Fallon	
26	Spivey Building	Spivey Building	January 17, 2002 (#01001462)	417 Missouri Ave. 38°37′36″N 90°09′32″W	East St. Louis	
27	Tiedemann House	Tiedemann House	May 29, 2020 (#100005233)	212 West Washington St. 38°35′36″N 89°54′48″W	O'Fallon	
28	Turkey Hill Grange Hall	Turkey Hill Grange Hall	December 27, 2016 (#16000902)	1375 E. IL 15; 38°28′40″N 89°56′23″W	Belleville	
29	Union Trust Bank Company Building	Union Trust Bank Company Building	May 27, 2014 (#14000255)	200 Collinsville Ave. 38°37′37″N 90°09′34″W	East St. Louis	
30	United States Post Office and Courthouse	United States Post Office and Courthouse	August 8, 2014 (#14000478)	750 Missouri Ave. 38°37′25″N 90°09′24″W	East St. Louis	

== Former listing ==
	Name on the Register	Image	Date listed	Date removed	Location	City or town	Description
1	St. Clair County Courthouse	St. Clair County Courthouse	May 17, 1972 (#72001564)	June 5, 1972	Public Sq.	Belleville	Demolished in June 1972

== See also ==
- List of National Historic Landmarks in Illinois
- National Register of Historic Places listings in Illinois
