= Heil Sound =

American audio equipment manufacturer

Heil Sound Communications, Inc.
- Company type: Private
- Industry: Professional Audio
- Founded: 1966
- Headquarters: Fairview Heights, Illinois
- Key people: Bob Heil (CEO Emeritus, Founder); Ash Levitt (CEO, President, Owner); Steve Warford (COO, Secretary, Owner)
- Products: Microphones, Headsets, Booms, Shock Mounts, Radio accessories
- Website: heilsound.com

Heil Sound Communications, Inc is an American manufacturer of professional audio equipment based in Fairview Heights, Illinois. The company was founded by Bob Heil in 1966, and is well known for inventions in live sound, the Heil Talk Box and a variety of high-quality microphones and headsets for use in commercial and amateur radio. Heil Sound is also the only manufacturer to be invited to exhibit at the Rock and Roll Hall of Fame.

== History ==
Heil Sound was founded in 1966 by inventor, organist, and amateur radio aficionado Bob Heil.

=== Sound system design ===
Starting in 1966 Bob Heil came back to his hometown of Marissa, Illinois and opened Ye Olde Music Shop, one of the country's first pro audio stores where he also sold Hammond organs. He would also fix the organs on stage before a performance for the musicians. Noticing that some PA systems were small, and some did not produce full-range sound and some could not project into a large crowd, Bob Heil started creating very large PA systems. Heil Sound began managing the sound in several venues around St. Louis, from auditoriums to bowling alleys.

The company experienced its first breakthrough on February 2, 1970, when Bob Heil and his sound team successfully created a new and innovative sound system for The Grateful Dead at the Fox Theater in St. Louis after the Dead's former sound engineer Augustus Owsley Stanley III was incarcerated. Heil Sound then accompanied the band on tour, later accompanying The Who, The James Gang, Jeff Beck, ZZ Top, Humble Pie, Seals and Crofts, Bachman-Turner Overdrive, Leslie West, J. Geils, Ike and Tina Turner, and Chuck Berry.

=== Heil Talk Box ===
In 1973 Bob Heil invented the Heil Talk Box, which was the very first high-powered talk box to be placed on the market. Heil Sound created the first one to be used on Joe Walsh’s Barnstorm Tour. The product became a signature sound for Joe Walsh, Peter Frampton and Richie Sambora (Bon Jovi). Heil Sound later sold the rights to Dunlop Manufacturing, Inc., where it continues to be a popular product.

=== Amateur radio ===
Around 1980 many of the large acts Heil Sound was working with were no longer touring. According to Heil, "Punk rock was the direction that music was going, and there was no challenge for me in that, so I quit [touring]." Heil began listening again to ham radio, and after feeling that the sound quality was still "mushy with no articulation", began working on microphones.

Heil Sound entered the amateur radio market, ostensibly working to fix what he perceived as problems in the industry involving poorly transmitted and received audio. Bob Heil developed lines of radio headsets and components.

In 1982 Heil Sound introduced their HC Series elements, specifically the HC-4 and HC-5, which allowed the non-DSP transmitters of the time to produce different sounding audio by changing microphone elements. The most recent is the HC-6, which is used in many of their current microphone models.

Heil Sound was also an early installer of large satellite dishes.

=== Home theaters ===
In the late 1980s, Heil Sound entered the home theater movement then becoming popular in the United States.

=== Pro microphones ===
By 1982, Heil Sound had curtailed the touring side of the business and concentrated on developing products for the amateur radio market. These two distinct markets – ham radio and pro audio – came together in 2006 when Joe Walsh, an avid ham operator and friend of Bob’s, called to suggest that Heil Sound develop microphones for concert use. Since that call, Heil Sound has been at the forefront of dynamic microphone design and manufacturing.

=== New ownership ===
In February 2022 Heil Sound announced the successful transfer of ownership from Bob and Sarah Heil to current President and CEO, Ash Levitt, and Director of Operations, Steve Warford. Sarah Heil has retired, but Bob continues to do outreach work and product design within the amateur radio space under the title Founder and CEO Emeritus. Both Levitt and Warford started working with Heil Sound as teenagers building and packaging products. Levitt took a different career path in academia for a number of years, but continued to regularly consult with Heil Sound during that time. He returned to the company full-time in 2017 and assumed the role of president in 2020. Warford worked his way up in the company during his tenure and has been responsible for daily operations for the past several years.

== Awards ==
Heil Sound has been invited to exhibit at the Rock and Roll Hall of Fame. Bob Heil was also named the Innovator of the Year at the Parnelli Awards in 2007. In 1989 Heil Sound was named "USA Satellite Dealer of the Year" by the Satellite Broadcasting and Communications Association in Las Vegas.
