= Downtown East St. Louis Historic District =

Historic district in Illinois, United States

- U.S. National Register of Historic Places
- U.S. Historic district
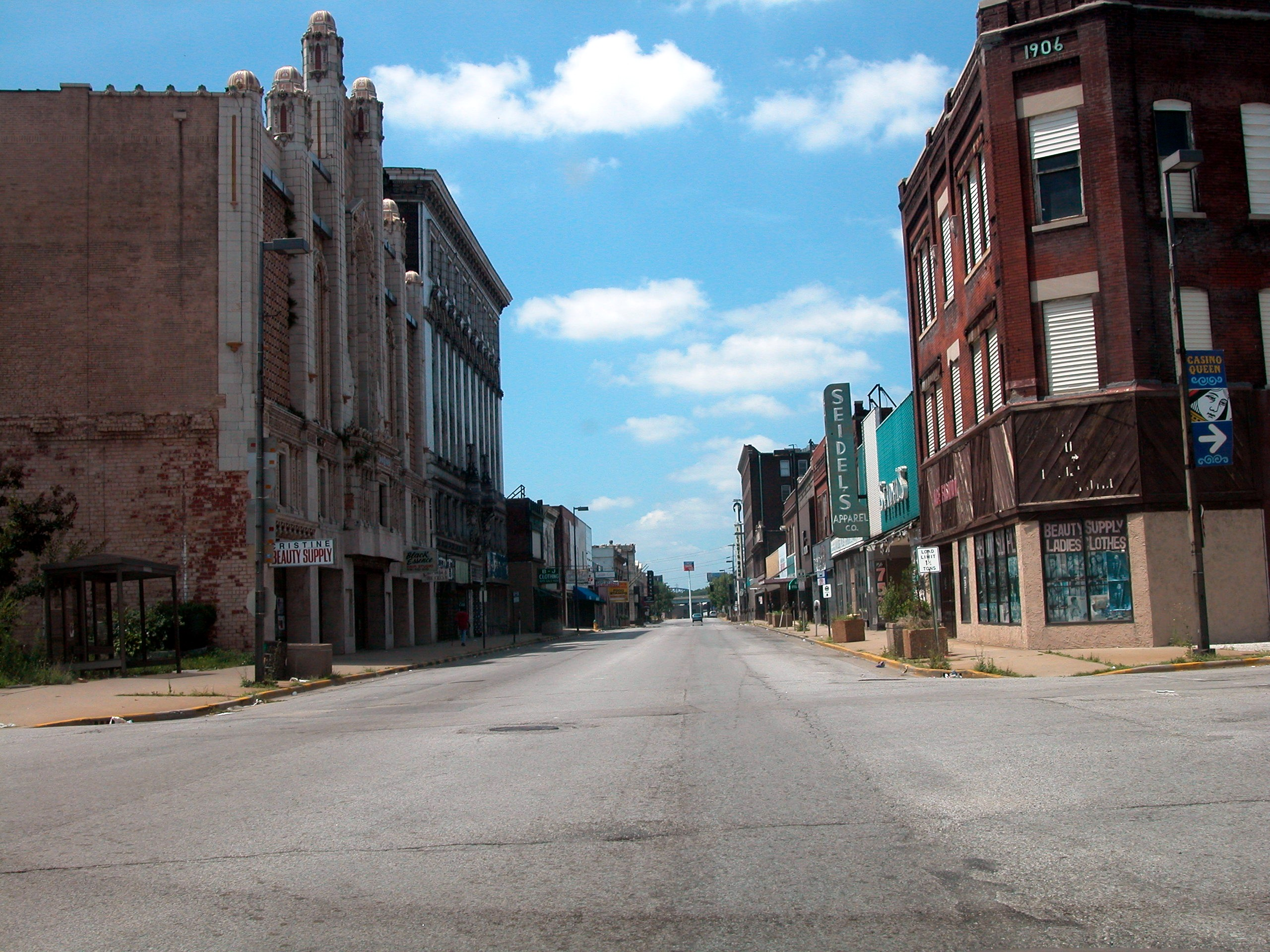
- Collinsville Avenue in 2003

- Location within Illinois Location within the United States
- Location: Portions of Collinsville, Missouri, and St. Louis Aves., East St. Louis, Illinois
- Coordinates: 38°37′38″N 90°9′32″W
- NRHP reference No.: 14000622
- Added to NRHP: September 17, 2014

The Downtown East St. Louis Historic District is a historic commercial district in downtown East St. Louis, Illinois. The district includes 35 buildings, 25 of which are contributing buildings, along Collinsville Avenue, Missouri Avenue, and St. Louis Avenue; all but one of the buildings was historically used for commercial purposes. While development in the area dates back to the late 19th century, the first of the extant buildings in the district were built around 1900 after a tornado devastated the area in 1896. By 1910, the area had become a prosperous commercial district with stores, offices, and entertainment venues; a surviving building from this period includes the Cahokia Building. Another large building boom took place in the 1920s, adding buildings such as the Spivey Building, the city's only skyscraper; the Union Trust Bank Company Building, the largest bank in the city; the Grossman Building; and the Majestic Theatre. The new buildings both coincided with a population and economic expansion in the city and allowed it to forge an architectural identity distinct from neighboring St. Louis.

Beginning in the 1960s, East St. Louis and its downtown entered a period of dramatic decline. Several major businesses left the city for other suburbs, urban decay and blight struck the city, resulting in the abandonment or demolition of several major commercial buildings. In addition, the rise of the automobile and the construction of new expressways took foot traffic away from the downtown area, furthering the decline of its businesses. The city's population is now one-third of its peak in 1950, and many of the district's buildings are abandoned and at risk of demolition or major decay.

The district was added to the National Register of Historic Places on September 17, 2014.
