= Robert S. Hamilton =

American politician and lawyer

Illinois State Senator

President Pro Tempore of the senate
- In office 1903–1911

Personal details
- Born: December 25, 1865 Marissa, Illinois, United States
- Died: August 7, 1940 (aged 74) Marrissa, Illinois
- Party: Republican
- Education: Monmouth College (Illinois)
- Profession: Attorney

Robert Sherman Hamilton (December 25, 1865 – August 7, 1940) was an American politician serving in the Illinois state senate, and lawyer.

Hamilton was born near Marissa, Illinois. He went to the public schools and to Marissa Academy. Hamilton taught school at Marissa Academy. Hamilton graduated from Monmouth College in 1892. He studied law and was admitted to the Illinois bar in 1895.

Hamilton practiced law in Marissa, Illinois. He was a Republican who served in the Illinois Senate from 1903 until 1911 and served as president pro tempore of the senate.

Hamilton died in Marissa, Illinois on August 7, 1940.
