= Paula D. McClain =

American political scientist

- Born: Paula Denice McClain; 1950 (age 75–76)
- Education: Howard University (BA, MA, PhD)
- Occupation: Political scientist
- Spouse: Paul Jacobson
- Children: 2, Kristina L. McClain-Jacobson Ragland and Jessica A. McClain-Jacobson

Paula Denice McClain (born 1950), is an American political scientist. She is currently professor of political science, public policy, and African and African American Studies at Duke University and is a widely quoted expert on racism and race relations. Her research focuses on racial minority-group politics and urban politics. She is co-director of Duke's Center for the Study of Race, Ethnicity and Gender in the Social Sciences, and director of the American Political Science Association's Ralph Bunche Summer Institute, which is hosted by Duke and funded by the National Science Foundation and Duke.

In 2007, McClain was elected chair of Duke's Academic Council. In 2012, she was appointed dean of the graduate school, becoming the first African-American dean of a school at Duke.

== Education and early career ==
McClain received her B.A. in political science from Howard University in 1972. She received an M.A. and Ph.D. in the same subject from Howard in 1974 and 1977 respectively. She participated in the Inter-university Consortium for Political and Social Research at the University of Michigan in the summers of 1978 and 1979.

From 1977 to 1982, she was an assistant professor in the Departments of Political Science at the University of Wisconsin–Milwaukee, and from 1977 to 1980 was also associated with the Department of Afro-American Studies at that institution. She had a post-doctoral fellowship at the Analysis Center of the Wharton School of the University of Pennsylvania in 1981–82. From 1982 to 1990 she was an associate professor at the School of Public Affairs, at Arizona State University; in 1990 she became full professor at that university.

From 1991 to 2000, she was a professor in the Woodrow Wilson Department of Government and Foreign Affairs at the University of Virginia. She served as the chair of that department from 1994 to 1997 and was director of the Ralph Bunche Summer Institute from 1996 to 2000. She also directed the Master of Arts in Public Administration and Public Policy Program from 1992 to 1994, and the Mid-Career Executive Program from 1993 to 1994. She was also associated with the Shannon Center for Advanced Studies at the University of Virginia from 1997 to 1998.

Since 2000, she has been a professor of political science at Duke University, with joint appointments at the Sanford Institute of Public Policy and the Department of African and African American Studies. In 2012, she was appointed Dean of The Graduate School and Vice Provost for Graduate Education, Duke University.

== Publications ==
McClain wrote the 1979 book Alienation and Resistance: The Political Behavior of Afro-Canadians. She edited the 1988 book Urban Minority Administrators: Politics, Policy and Style with Albert K. Karnig. She co-authored the 1990 book Race, Place, and Risk: Black Homicide in Urban America with Harold M. Rose; in 1995 it won the National Conference of Black Political Scientists' Best Book Award for a previously published book that has made a substantial and continuing contribution. McClain also edited the 1993 book Minority Group Influence: Agenda Setting, Formulation, and Public Policy.

Her 1995 book "Can We All Get Along?": Racial and Ethnic Minorities in American Politics, co-authored with Joseph Stewart Jr., won the Gustavus Myers Center for the Study of Human Rights in North America Award for Outstanding Scholarship on the Subject of Intolerance. It is now in its fifth edition. Her book American Government in Black and White, co-authored with Steven C. Tauber, is forthcoming.

Her articles and reviews have appeared in The Journal of Politics, American Politics Quarterly, American Political Science Review, Policy Studies Review, Western Political Quarterly, Urban Affairs Review, Ethnicity, and The Du Bois Review.

McClain has served on the editorial boards of the Journal of Women, Politics & Policy, American Political Science Review, American Politics Quarterly, American Journal of Political Science, Journal of Politics, American Review of Politics, Frontiers: A Journal of Women Studies, Policy Studies Journal, Journal of Homicide Studies, Urban Affairs Quarterly, and PS. She has been president of the National Conference of Black Political Scientists, vice president of the International Political Science Association, and president of the Southern Political Science Association, and has been a very active participant in the annual conferences of these and other organizations in the political sciences. Among her awards are the 2007 Frank J. Goodnow Distinguished Service Award from the American Political Science Association and the 2007 Meta Mentor Award from the Women's Caucus for Political Science of the American Political Science Association.

== Comments on race issues ==
An article in Politico on January 19, 2009, about racial issues and the presidency of Barack Obama, who was about to take the oath of office, quoted McClain as saying that Obama had approached the subject of race "without a bullhorn saying, 'This is what I'm doing.'" McClain offered as an example "the diversity of Obama's cabinet, which she notes was simply achieved, not trumpeted."

McClain took part in a discussion on NPR on March 20, 2009, on the question of whether America is still divided by race issues. McClain answered with a firm yes, and added, in part: "I would like us to begin to do something about the structural inequalities that exist and do something in a very serious way. Now whether it means we actually talk about doing these things and then do them or don't talk about them but then we do them is something that I would like us to do."

Apropos of "racially insensitive" remarks in 2010 by Glenn Beck describing President Obama as a racist, the arrest of black Harvard professor Henry Louis Gates Jr., and the Obama administration's dismissal of a black Agriculture Department official for making supposedly racist remarks, McClain told the Singapore Straits Times: "It's dispiriting and disheartening that we are still dealing with these kinds of issues."

== Duke lacrosse team rape scandal ==
McClain was a leading member of the "Group of 88", a group of 88 professors at Duke who put their names to an advertisement that appeared in the Chronicle, the Duke student newspaper, in 2006 after white members of the Duke lacrosse team were accused of raping a black woman on March 13 of that year. In Until Proven Innocence, their book about the Duke lacrosse-team rape controversy, KC Johnson and Stuart Taylor Jr., wrote that "McClain's extraordinary sensitivity to imagined racial slights from the desperately politically correct [Duke president Richard] Brodhead administration contrasted with her indifference to— if not approval of— the many very real racially inflammatory statements by her Group of 88 colleagues".

Remarks made by McClain to the Duke Chronicle, and quoted in a Chronicle article that appeared on April 11, 2006, made it clear that she used the lacrosse-team rape charges in classroom discussions to illustrate points about racism and sexism. Apropos of a visit to her "Race and American Politics" class by Hollywood film director Paul Haggis to talk about racism, she told the Chronicle that Haggis had "hit so many things that we've been talking about here....Then the lacrosse allegations intervened, and so it became much more relevant -- that this wasn't just what we were reading in class."

An article that appeared in the Duke Chronicle on June 9, 2006, reported that in the wake of the rape allegations, "increased demands from students and administrators contributed to a challenging semester for many black faculty at Duke" and "have led to calls for renewed efforts in the hiring and retention of black professors." The article quoted McClain as saying that "Black faculty in particular [have been affected] because of the very racial dimensions of some aspects of the incident....The substantial number of faculty people that I have talked to have all felt the same way – that the University failed to recognize the racial dimensions of this and failed to address it quickly." McClain called this allegedly slow response to the case's "racial dimensions" "depressing and demoralizing for faculty" and complained, in the Chronicle's paraphrase, that "[n]o administrator" had "met with members of the black faculty to explicitly address the issues broached by the lacrosse incident." The Chronicle further paraphrased her as saying that it "is crucial for administrators to create a welcoming and comfortable environment for black faculty." "Black faculty that are here," McClain warned, "may consider leaving, and it may be far more difficult when black faculty are leaving to recruit others."

Women in Higher Education reported on July 1, 2006, that in the wake of the lacrosse-team rape scandal, the team, under the "guidance" of Duke president Richard Brodhead, had written "a mission statement" in which "players pledge to 'demonstrate the virtues of compassion, sensitivity and respect.'" But the article said that in the view of McClain, the conduct of some of the lacrosse players was "so far out of bounds" that "agreeing to a set of principles and admitting that they were wrong" was not sufficient to bring about change.

== Personal ==
McClain is married; she and her husband have two daughters.
