= Bob Heil =

American sound and radio engineer (1940–2024)

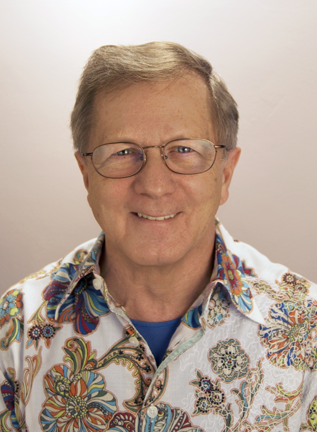
- Born: October 5, 1940; St. Louis, Missouri, U.S.
- Died: February 28, 2024 (aged 83); Belleville, Illinois, U.S.
- Employer: Heil Sound
- Known for: Creating Heil Talk Box
- Spouse: Sarah Heil
- Children: 2
- Call sign: K9EID

Robert Gene Heil (October 5, 1940 – February 28, 2024) was an American audio and radio engineer who created the template for modern rock sound systems. He founded the company Heil Sound in 1966 and built touring sound systems for bands such as The Grateful Dead and The Who. He was also a musician, and played the Wurlizter organ in concert halls and theatres.

In 1973 he invented the Heil Talk Box, which was used by musicians such as Peter Frampton, Joe Walsh and Richie Sambora. In 2007, he was invited to exhibit at the Rock and Roll Hall of Fame. Heil was also an innovator in the field of amateur radio, and manufactured microphones and satellite dishes for broadcasters and live sound engineers.

== Early life ==
Bob Heil was born in 1940 in St. Louis to Bob Heil and LaVerna (nee Bills), and lived in Marissa in the coalfields of southern Illinois. By the age of ten he was playing the accordion. He became a proficient theater organ musician at a young age, performing at various local restaurants from the age of 14. At 15, he became house player for the Wurlitzer theater organ in the Fox Theater in St. Louis. He learned how to tune and voice the thousands of pipes in the Wurlitzer, which taught him how to listen and dissect discrete tones, an important skill throughout his several careers. He was a student of organist Stan Kann and played the Wurlitzer organ in concert halls and restaurants for 12 years.

In his teens he also became an avid amateur radio operator, and began designing and building homemade transmitters, amplifiers, and antenna systems. His call sign was K9EID.

== Career ==
In his early twenties, Heil began designing and building theater pipe organ installations in the Holiday Inn North restaurant in St. Louis, playing the instruments six nights a week. After having played the organ for eight years, in 1966 he opened a professional music shop in Marissa, Illinois, to deal in Hammond organs, and it was originally his ambition to teach piano and organ.

In 1966 he founded Heil Sound. He experimented with live sound systems and became the technician at venues around St. Louis, from auditoriums to bowling alleys. Large sound systems at the time were comparatively weak and primitive. (In 1965, for example, The Beatles had played New York's Shea Stadium using only a Shure Vocalmaster PA system plugged into the baseball park's announcement system.)

=== The Grateful Dead concert ===
On February 2, 1970, jam band the Grateful Dead were scheduled to play a concert at the Fox Theater in St. Louis. For the tour they were using a sound system run and developed by their sound engineer, "Bear" Augustus Owsley Stanley III. Owsley, who had a pending drug charge, was under orders not to leave the state of California, and had been arrested on February 1 for leaving the state to be at a Grateful Dead show in New Orleans. The police also detained most of the Dead's sound system. George Bales, a stage hand at Fox Theater, gave Jerry Garcia Heil's phone number, and Heil arranged to provide the band with the necessary equipment.

Heil, one of the two organists on the Mighty Wurlitzer in the Fox, had been given the large discarded loudspeakers that the theatre had recently replaced with new ones, and he had built them into a new sound system using the Altec Lansing A-4 speaker cabinets. He replaced the 15-inch speakers with JBL D140s, and added an array of four radial horns and ring tweeters, all driven by McIntosh Labs amplifiers. He said, "That made a huge difference. It was like a big 'hi-fi' system. No one was putting radial horns into PA systems, they were just doing speakers in columns, like the Vocalmaster. The horns are what give the system intelligibility — you can actually understand the lyrics." His stack riggings resulted in an unusual frequency range from below 200 Hz to well over 15 kHz.

He also brought in a modified Langevin studio recording console which had been adapted for live work. Heil's friend Tomlinson Holman, a student at the University of Illinois who later created the THX theater sound protocol, helped with the rewiring, and Heil created an electronic crossover in the console to control speaker output. As well as the PA system that night, Heil also supplied the band with mixers and sound engineers. "My two roadies, Peter Kimble and John Lloyd, knew all the Dead songs — they were big fans. So that night they moved the PA, set it up and mixed the show."

Heil had developed a unique technique to handle feedback problems, a small second microphone taped behind each main microphone. "We would run the microphones out of phase from the monitors, something that nobody had been doing yet. Since they were out of phase with the microphones and the FOH system, anything that leaked in from the monitors would be canceled out. As a result, we could get these things incredibly loud before they would feed back. That's one of the things that Jerry Garcia really loved."

The show was a success and the Grateful Dead asked Heil, his crew, and his sound system to join them on the road. Heil's setup became a template for modern concert touring sound systems and the 'Heil' brand became ubiquitous in venues across the US. In 1978, Heil published a "Practical Guide for Concert Sound" which "became a field guide for techies and roadies worldwide".

=== Major tours ===
The Who

After Heil toured with the Dead, Billboard reported that a small Midwest sound system purveyor had snagged the position. Shortly after the article was published, Heil received a call from the management of The Who. They had been experiencing a difficult start to their US tour, and Heil brought a more refined and powerful version of his sound system to their shows. "We did the Who's Next tour for a year and a half, across the US, to Europe and back here again." The tour created a bond between Heil and Who guitarist Pete Townshend, who commissioned Heil to create the quadraphonic sound system he had envisioned for the live tour after the release of their Quadrophenia LP. According to Heil, "We set up two 15-channel Midas consoles together, put speakers in four corners and we were able to fly Roger Daltrey's voice around the room. When we did Madison Square Garden with Quadrophenia, the PA was enormous. I think we had on each side six to eight 15-inch speaker bins, six to eight radial horns, and about a dozen tweeters. We could get about 110dB to 115dB on that stage before feedback. And the Who loved it, man, because it was loud, and they loved loud." Heil toured with other major acts of the 1970s, including Joe Walsh, Peter Frampton, and Jeff Beck.

=== Heil Sound ===
Heil founded Heil Sound, which was based in Fairview Heights, Illinois, and manufactured a variety of microphones for professional use, as well as gear for Amateur Radio enthusiasts.

In the late 1980s, Heil Sound became one of the first American companies to create and install home theaters. Heil has lectured at major electronic conventions and taught classes and has won numerous awards and honors.

Heil Talk Box

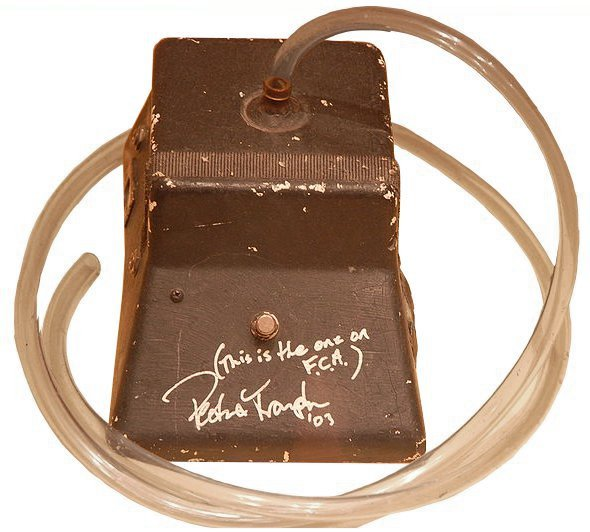
Peter Frampton's Heil Talk Box from 1973

The Heil Talk Box became famous after being used by Joe Walsh, Peter Frampton, and Richie Sambora. The device blended the sound of voice and guitar. It was the first high-powered talk box on the market which could reliably be used on high-level rock stages. The Heil Talk Box was developed in 1973 and was built for Joe Walsh's Barnstorm Tour. Frampton frequently used a Heil Talk Box after receiving one as a Christmas present from Heil in 1974, and it can be prominently heard on his 1975 album Frampton. Heil later sold the rights to Dunlop Manufacturing, Inc.

Amateur radio

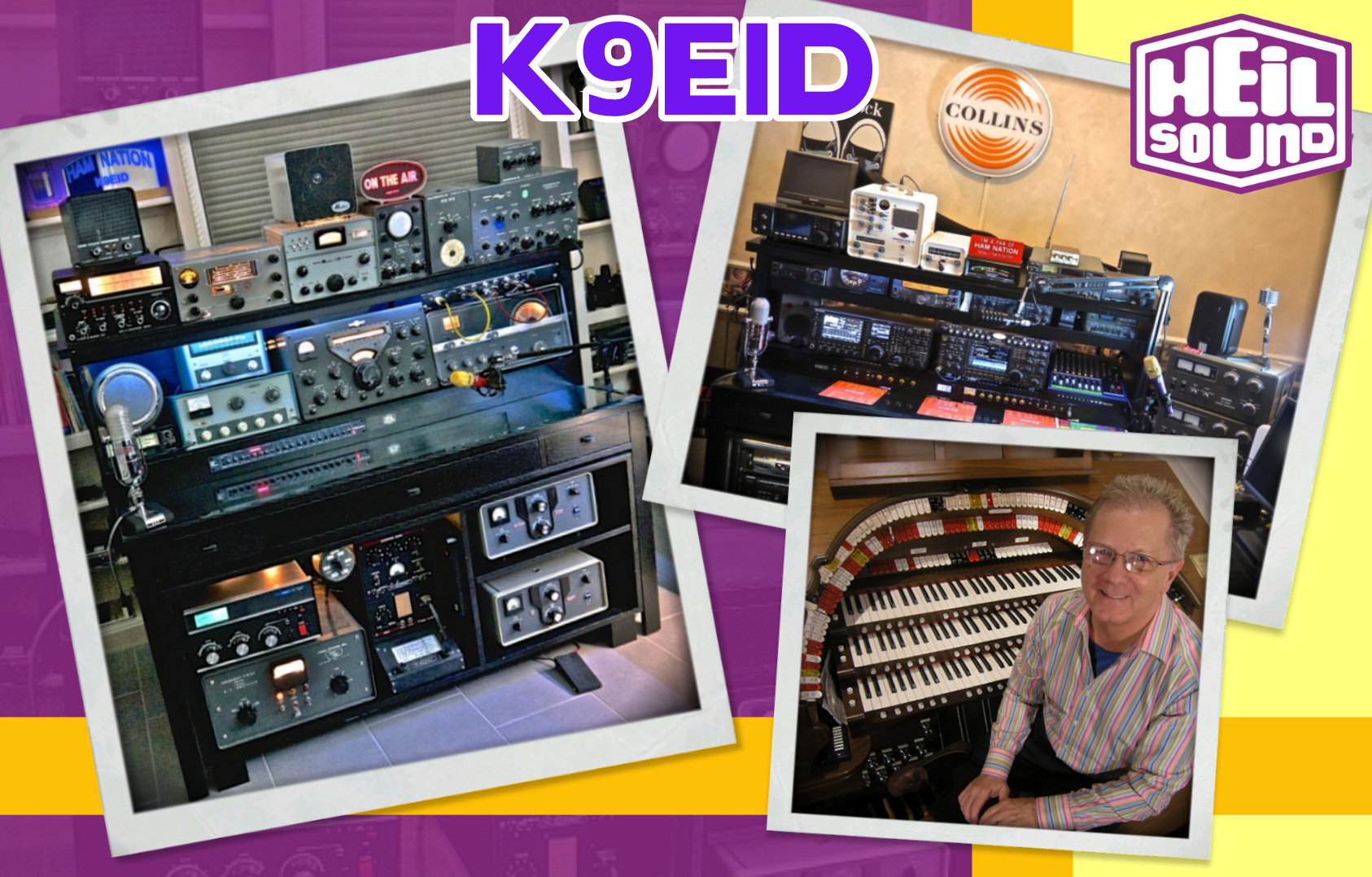
Bob Heil's amateur radio QSL card

In the late 1970s, Heil Sound entered the amateur radio market. Heil worked on fixing problems in the industry involving poorly transmitted and received audio. He applied science learned from Paul Klipsch, Don Leslie, Martin Wick, and the Bell Labs Fletcher–Munson curves. He developed his HC series microphones for amateur radio communication. Heil Sound was also an early installer of large satellite dishes for radio.

Netcast

In May 2011, Heil became the host of a live weekly Ham Radio Netcast "Ham Nation" on Leo Laporte's podcasting network, TWiT.

Home theaters

In the late 1980s, Heil Sound entered the home theater movement that was becoming popular in the United States. His company was one of the first to design and install Custom Home theater systems, with over 3,000 audio/video systems installed as of 2010. Heil installed the very first DSS System, which he placed at the St. Louis office of Bob Costas. He was also on the original test team for the RCA DirecTV dish system.

== Lectures, publications ==
Heil worked as a teacher and lecturer, often appearing at major electronic and satellite conventions. He taught classes at CES and NAB shows in Las Vegas, Trebas Institute in Toronto and Blackbird Academy in Nashville. He published five books on music and sound technology.

== Personal life ==
Heil lived with his wife, Sarah Benton, in Metro-East St. Louis. He has two daughters and one stepson. He continued to play the Wurlitzer Organ at the Fox Theater in St Louis, and had a classic car collection, chiefly of 50s Thunderbirds. Heil additionally performed his organ music on Lebanon, Tennessee-based international shortwave station WTWW's 100,000 watt 5085 kHz shortwave frequency each Saturday at 8pm central time (192 kbit/s stereo internet stream also available). Heil's program was discontinued when WTWW's music programming moved to WRMI in 2022.

Heil died from cancer in Belleville, Illinois, on February 28, 2024, at the age of 83.

His amateur radio call sign was K9EID.

== Awards ==
From the 1980s, Heil won several awards and honors. He was the "International Amateur Radio Operator of the Year" in 1982, an award which had been held by Barry Goldwater the year before. He was later awarded the 1989 "USA Satellite Dealer of the Year" by the Satellite Broadcasting and Communications Association in Las Vegas. In 1995, he received the very first "Live Sound Pioneer Award" at the Audio Engineering Society Convention" in San Francisco.

Heil won the Parnelli Award for Innovator of the Year in 2007. Also in 2007, he was invited into the Rock and Roll Hall of Fame to put up a display of his historically important gear, which included the first modular mixing console (the Mavis), his custom quadraphonic mixer (originally used on the Quadrophenia tour), and the very first Heil Talk Box. He was the first manufacturer to be invited into the Hall. On December 20, 2014, Heil was awarded an Honorary Doctoral Degree in Music and Technology from the University of Missouri.

== Publishing history ==
- Heil, Bob (1966). Professional Drawbar Tips for the Hammond Organ. Heil.
- Heil, Bob (1978). Practical Guide for Concert Sound. Melco Publishing. OCLC 6239218.
- Heil, Bob (1980). The 10 meter FM handbook. Melco Publishing.
- Heil, Bob (1983). Heil Ham Radio Handbook.
- Heil, Bob (1984). Practical Guide for Concert Sound - Volume 2. Melco Publishing.

== See also ==
External videos
- Oral History, Bob Heil reflects on the night he provided sound equipment for the Grateful Dead when their equipment was suddenly unavailable, and the many opportunities that followed. Interview date January 20, 2007, NAMM (National Association of Music Merchants) Oral History Library

- Talk box – Effects unit that allows musicians to modify the sound of a musical instrument
- Quadraphonic sound – Four-channel speaker audio
- Amateur radio – Non-commercial use of the radio spectrum
