= Islington Hotel =

Coordinates: 45°58′52″N 84°21′02″W

The Islington Hotel, circa 1910

The Islington Hotel was a family owned and operated lakefront inn located in Cedarville, Michigan in the state's Eastern Upper Peninsula. Constructed in the late 19th century, the facility lodged and entertained summer guests for more than 60 years. During its heyday it was considered to be one of the finest seasonal hotels in the Upper Midwest.

== Construction and early years: 1895-1904 ==
The Islington was a summer hotel located in the Upper Peninsula of Michigan. Built between April and June 1895 on Islington Point in Lake Huron's Les Cheneaux Islands, the Islington Hotel was conceived by Milo Melchers, a lawyer from Toledo, Ohio. The hotel's first guests arrived on July 1, 1895, and rooms were available until September.

During the hotel's construction, Milo's wife Rose chose to spend the summer in England with their two daughters because of her horror at such a vast undertaking. Born into the Stroh Brewery family in Detroit, Rose Stroh Melchers was of the opinion that, "people who were educated and had a profession did not operate hotels." Rose and Milo (as Melchers & Company) ran the Islington as chief operating officers through 1904.

In its early years, the Islington was a place for sport fishermen. It was a U-shaped wooden structure, three stories tall with dormers and wide verandas on the lake sides. The 62 guest rooms provided no running water or bathrooms. There were stone fireplaces and rustic furniture in the living room and lobby. Rates included meals that were served daily in the dining room.

== Rose Melchers as proprietor: 1905-1945 ==
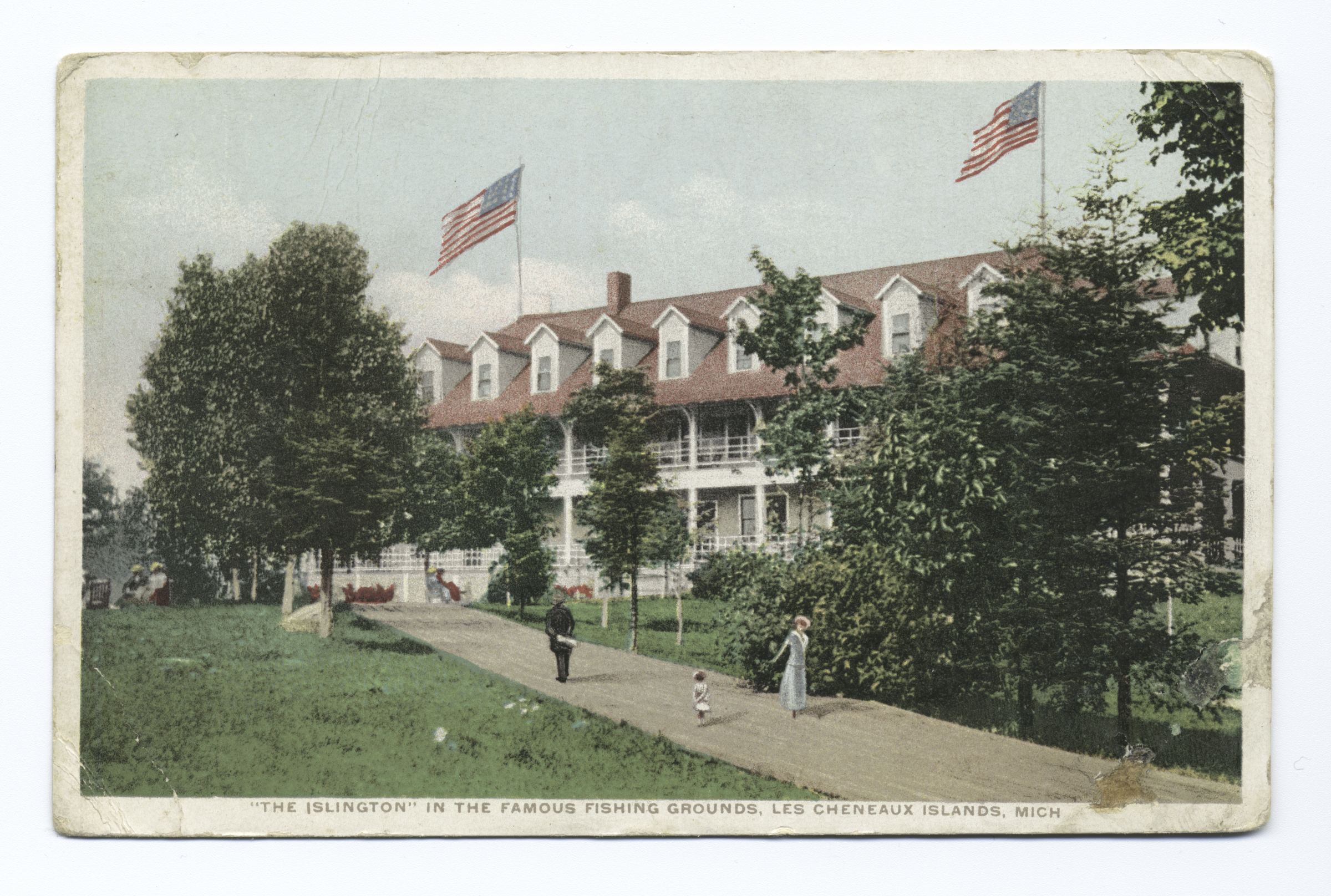
Postcard of the Islington Hotel, 1898

In 1905, after she and Milo Melchers split up, Rose Stroh Melchers became sole proprietor of the Islington. Rose said she would run the hotel until a buyer could be found. For forty summers, Mrs. Melchers hired local residents, college students and key professionals to work at the hotel. Each year the Islington opened June 25 and closed September 15. Over the years, gas lighting gave way to electricity. Indoor plumbing was added. A tennis court, croquet, shuffleboard, a billiard room, a recreation room, card rooms, dances, parties and other activities were available to guests who returned year after year.

Wooden fishing boats, yachts and large steamers delivering guests, provisions and mail to the hotel from Chicago and Detroit via Mackinac Island used the Islington docks. Guests came from cities such as St. Louis, Cincinnati, Chicago and Detroit. In later years, goods were picked up from or delivered by businesses in the growing towns of Cedarville and Pickford as well as the city of Sault Ste. Marie, Michigan to the north. The automobile and better roads provided the means for guests to travel to the Islington's location on the mainland.

The Islington was called "the grandest and most self-evidently successful of the Les Cheneaux Hotels." Celebrities such as the actor Jimmy Durante and the author Booth Tarkington and his family stayed at the Islington. During the 1930s and 1940s, a staff of approximately 30 catered to every need. In the lakeview dining room, guests "dressed for dinner" and dined on chef-prepared food that met Rose Melchers' high standards. For many years the Islington was recommended as a 1st Class eating establishment by Duncan Hines, an early forerunner of the Zagat rating program. Whitefish and lake trout were delivered from the catching nets several times a week.

Starting in the 1920s, Rose Melchers' two married daughters, Hermione Uptegrove and Helen Wells, wished to improve what they called the "Islington Experience." Hermione (known as Hermi) was a pianist, as was her father, Milo. She provided books, games, costuming and musical entertainment for guests in the afternoons and evenings. Hermi also managed the housekeeping duties until Stan (Mac) Wells took over hotel management. Helen took care of the formal gardens and supervised maintenance of the wooden walkways, docks, shoreline developments, outdoor game areas, grounds, signage and nature trails. As a photographer, Helen recorded the life and times of the Islington, including visitors, amenities, and the natural environment of the area. Rose’s five grandchildren were also expected to help out in or around the hotel as they grew older.

For many years, the Islington maintained a 4th Class Post Office that was open for summers only. Rose Melchers, followed by her grandson Stanfield (Mac) Wells Jr., were long-time Postmasters. Rose Melchers’ youngest grandson, William Wells, was the last Postmaster in 1952, as Cedarville then became the Islington's Post Office.

== Later years: 1946-1959 ==
During the war years of 1943, 1944 and 1945, the Islington was closed for general guest use. Nevertheless, many friends of Rose Melchers and her daughters were visitors or informal guests during this period. When the hotel officially reopened in 1946, Stanfield (Mac) Wells, Jr. assumed management of the Islington through 1950. In 1951, another grandson, Stephen (Sandy) Wells and his wife Annabelle took over the running of the hotel. Assuming full ownership in 1952, the couple added several guest cottages along the lakeshore and a beach house on Melchers Bay for picnics and parties. In 1958, the Islington closed its doors to guests forever. The wooden structure was razed in 1959, marking the end of an era when "people escaped crowded, sweltering Midwestern cities for clean air and clean water."

A former hotel employee said that the Islington era "was made exceptional" by Rose Melchers, her children and grandchildren, who set the tone for friendliness and graciousness that permeated the Islington experience.
