= Albert Frankel (architect) =

Swedish architect (1868–1957)

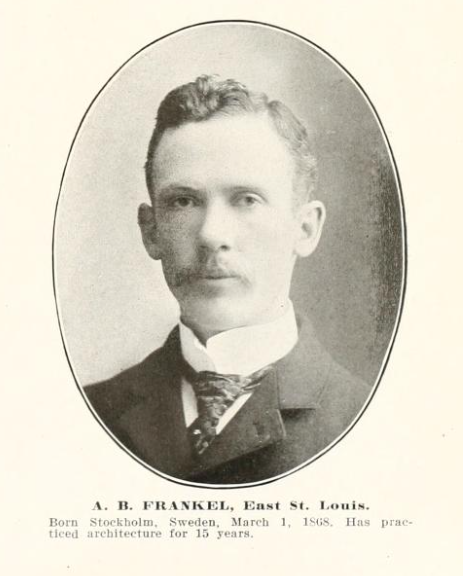
- Portrait from the 1902 publication Men of Illinois.
- Born: March 1, 1868; Stockholm, Sweden
- Died: June 27, 1957 (aged 89); California, United States
- Resting place: Forest Lawn Memorial Park, Los Angeles, California
- Occupation: Architect

Albert Brur Frankel (March 1, 1868 – June 27, 1957) was a Swedish-American architect who lived the majority of his life in East St. Louis, Illinois. He is most known for designing the Spivey Building, the only skyscraper ever constructed in the city.

== Biography ==
Frankel was born in Stockholm, Sweden on March 1, 1868 to Lars and Theresa Frankel. The three, along with his elder brother August, immigrated to the United States in 1870. Despite no confirmation, it can be believed the family was fleeing the country due to economic hardship and the Swedish famine of 1867–1869. The family was confirmed to be living in East St. Louis, Illinois by 1880. He was viewed as an esteemed architect by the turn of the century. He had been practicing the craft for 15 years by 1902. Meaning his studies began by age 18-19, likely from nearby McKendree College, now McKendree University. His brother is stated as being a mechanic by 1906. We know that same year that Frankel was the superintendent of the Elks Building where his office was located at 206 Collinsville avenue. Frankel is identified as living with his wife Harriet Campbell by 1910. By 1940, Albert and his wife had both moved to Los Angeles. Harriet died in 1954 at the age of 88, preceding Albert, who died on June 27, 1957 aged 89. They are both buried within Forest Lawn Memorial Park in the Hollywood Hills. They are two of the earliest-born people in the cemetery.

== Architectural works ==
Albert was largely a local architect who assisted in the creation of many structures in the City of East St. Louis, St. Clair County, and parts of Southern Illinois. Although, many of the records that attest certain structures to his design are lost.

Name	Completed	Address	Condition
Joyce House	1901	1005 Pennsylvania Ave, East St. Louis	Katherine Dunham Museum
First Methodist Church	1904?	1301 Summit Ave?, East St. Louis	Demolished (2002)
Murphy Building	1909	234 Collinsville Ave, East St. Louis	Demolished (2015)
Ainad Temple (In conjunction with William Ittner)	1923	609 St Louis Ave, East St. Louis	In use
Spivey Building	1927	417 Missouri Ave, East St. Louis	Abandoned (1980)

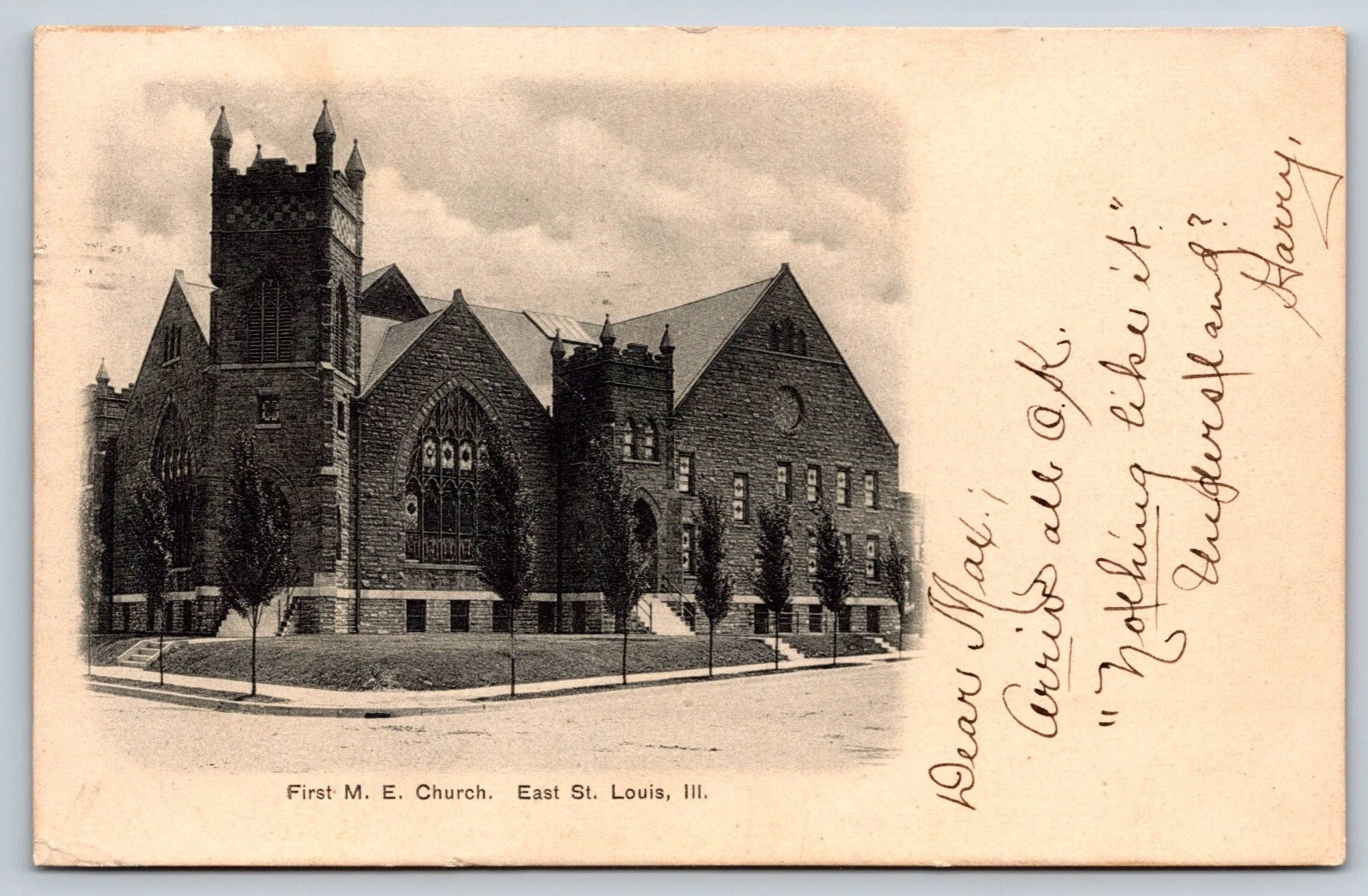
The First Methodist Episcopal Church seen on a 1908 postcard.

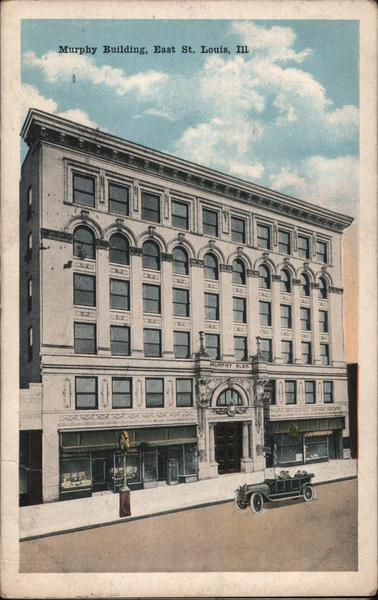
The Murphy Building as seen on a 1919 postcard, was located just to the right of where the abandoned Majestic Theatre now sits. The building was demolished in May 2015.

Ainad temple under construction in 1922.

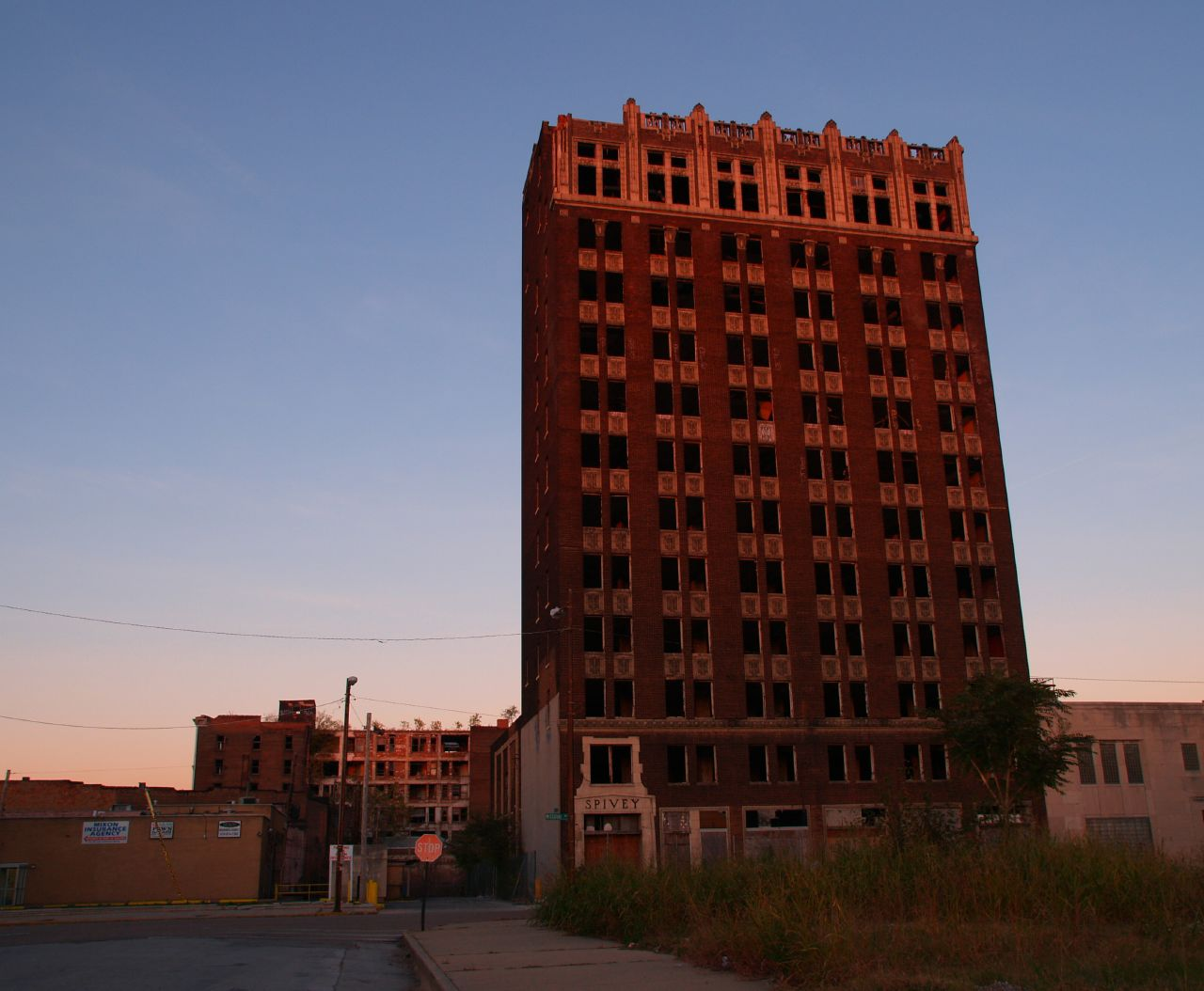
The Spivey Building seen in 2008, it is often considered Albert's most famous work and was the only skyscraper ever built in East St. Louis.
