= Fourth-class post office =

U.S. post office classification

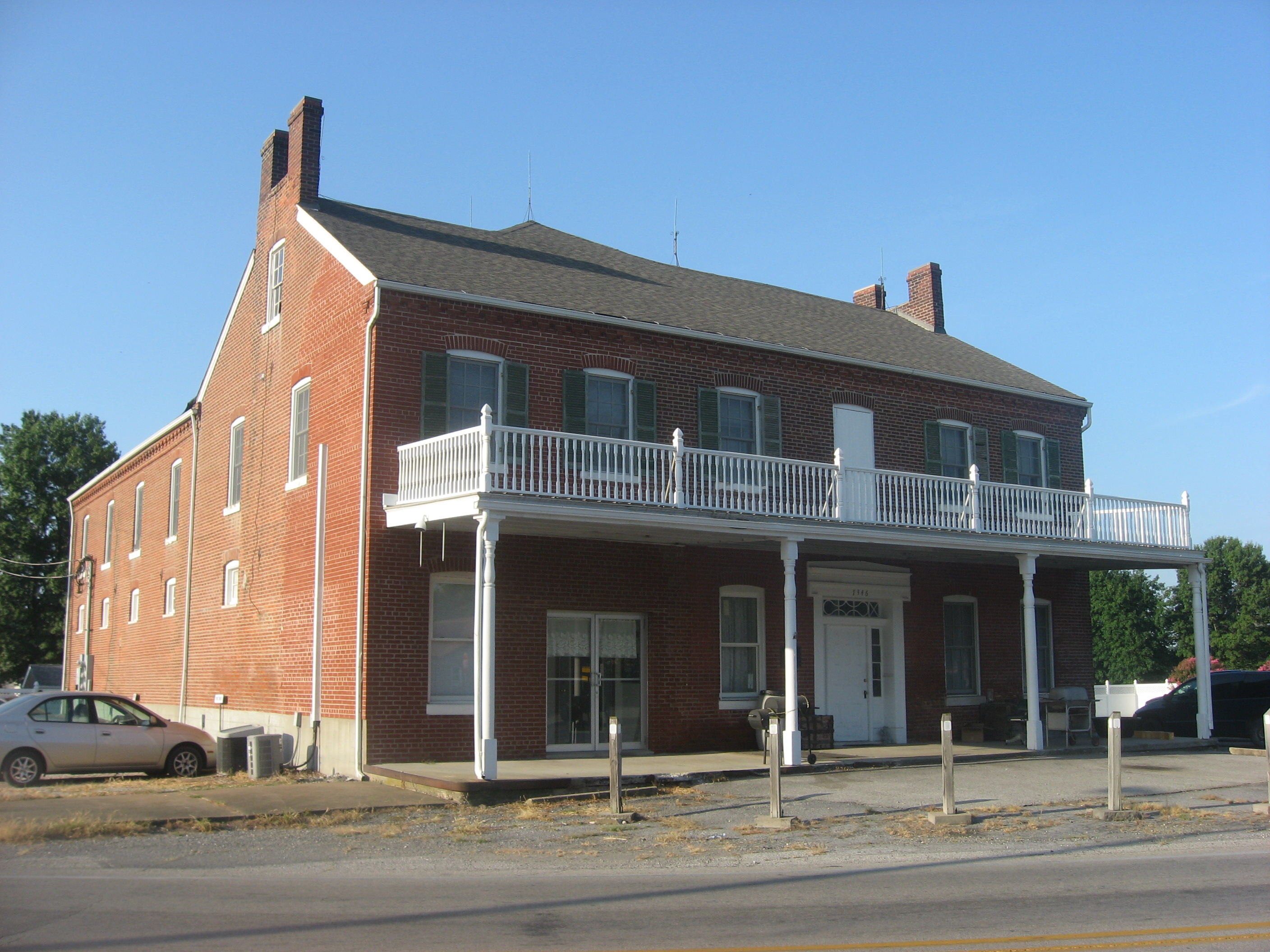
The Rutter Store in St. Libory, Illinois, former site of a fourth-class post office.

A fourth-class post office in the United States, from 1864 to the 1970s, was a post office at which the postmaster received the lowest tier of annual commission income from postage stamps. Prior to the early 20th century, fourth-class post offices were the backbone of the U.S. postal system. They were also in many cases the backbones of the hamlets and rural communities where they were located, as they provided a local gathering place and center of civic activity. These small rural post offices followed an agency model, in which the Post Office Department used existing buildings and businesses and paid its postmasters on a commission basis.

The rise of rural free delivery and the resulting consolidation of post offices spelled the end for many fourth-class post offices. In 1901, fourth-class post offices numbered over 70,000, more than 90% of all post offices in the country. By the 1970s they numbered less than 6,000.

== 19th century ==
In 1864, the 38th United States Congress passed legislation establishing five classes of postmasterships, based on the commission income the postmasters had received over the previous two years. The fourth class consisted of postmasters with $1,000 or less of commission income per year, and the fifth class consisted of postmasters with $100 or less of commission income per year. Under this classification, postmasters of the first, second, and third classes became "presidential postmasters" requiring Senate approval and receiving a higher salary. In 1874, the fifth class was merged into the fourth class, and salaries for all of these fourth-class postmasters were replaced by commission income.

Between 1864 and 1874, many fourth-class postmasters sought to demonstrate that they had sufficient commissions to qualify for a third-class postmastership; accusations of fraud in these demonstrations led to disputes over pay that were not fully resolved until after World War I. After commission payments replaced salaries in 1874, these commissions were based on the number of stamps sold rather than stamps canceled, as had been the case for commission income before 1864. Many fourth-class postmasters accordingly sought to boost their commissions by taking advantage of their ability to sell stamps at below the official price. Congress eliminated this practice in 1878 by once again setting commissions based on stamp cancellations rather than sales.

Fourth-class post offices usually did not have a separate building but were colocated with a local business such as a general store or in a private residence. They often served as political gathering places. They also often served as a rural community's point of contact with the outside world. The income from fourth-class postmasterships was low, averaging $200 per year in 1899, but those postmasters who were also businesspeople benefited from the increased traffic to their businesses.

Fourth-class postmasters were most commonly storekeepers, local newspaper editors, or politically active farmers. Because postmasters were required by a 1863 law to be residents of the community they served, they generally had strong local connections. These strong local ties were among the reasons why an 1896 effort by Postmaster General William Lyne Wilson to replace fourth-class post offices with substations staffed by clerks from central urban post offices was unsuccessful.

Mail traveled to and from fourth-class post offices by way of star routes operated by private contractors, frequently either on stagecoach or horseback.

=== Patronage and civil service ===
Unlike presidential postmasters, fourth-class postmasters were appointed by the president without Senate approval. In the 19th and early 20th centuries, these postmasterships were valuable patronage positions. Fourth-class postmasters were typically closely politically tied to their local Congressional representative, who would recommend them to the president. Changes in partisan control of the presidency in 1885 and 1889 led to tens of thousands of fourth-class postmasters being replaced each time.

In 1908, by executive order, Theodore Roosevelt brought 15,000 fourth-class postmasters in the East and Midwest into the federal civil service. In 1912, William Howard Taft brought the remaining postmasters into the civil service. Following this change, those fourth-class postmasters who received at least $500 per year in commission income were required to pass a civil service examination before their appointment; the remainder were appointed by the Postmaster General upon recommendation by a postal inspector.

== 20th century ==
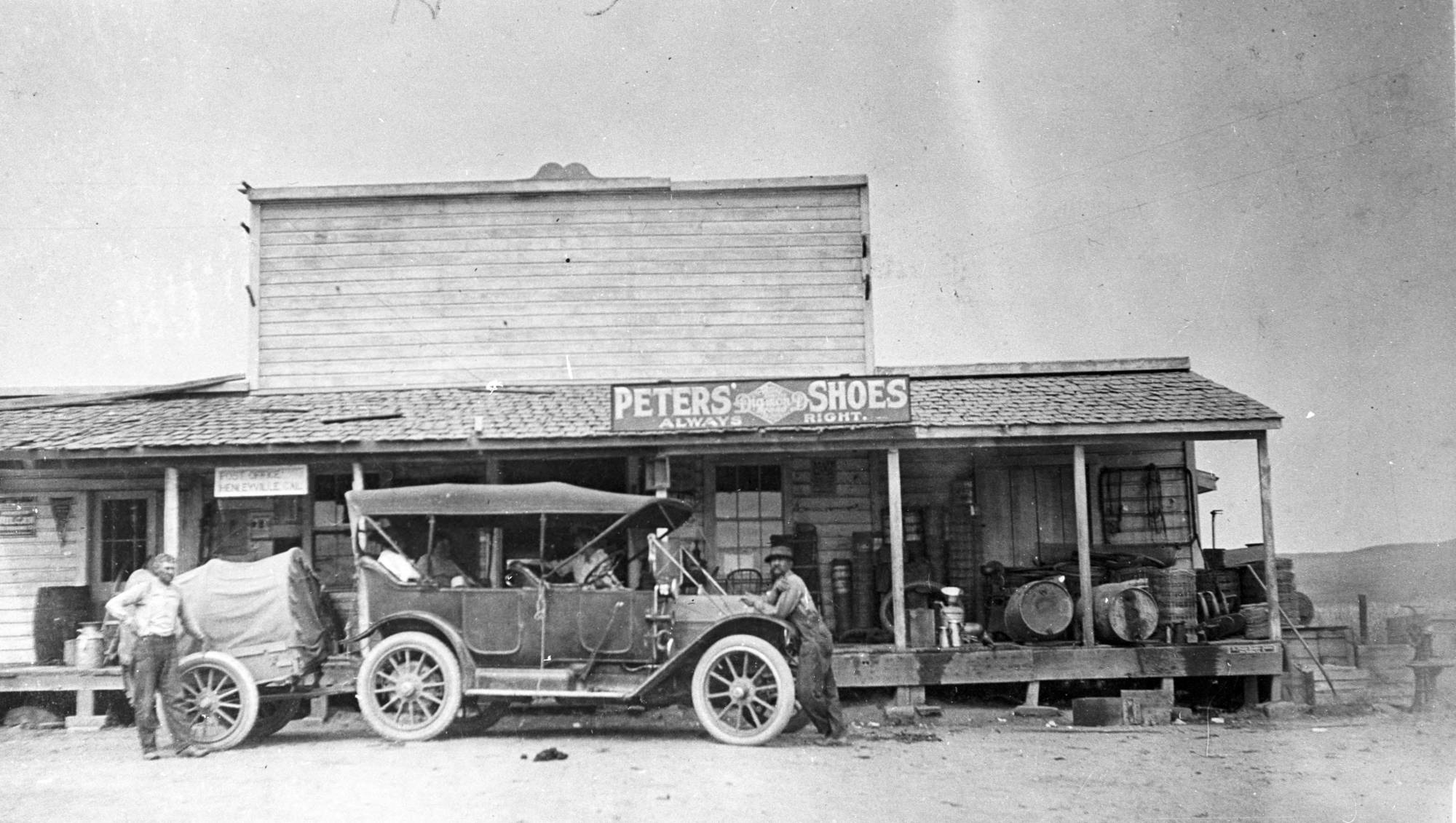
Henleyville Post Office and Peter's Shoes in Tehama County, California in the 1920s.

The advent of Rural Free Delivery in the 1890s marked the end of many fourth-class post offices. 13,490 were closed from 1898 to 1908. Initially this impact was geographically limited; fourth-class post offices became rarer in the East and Midwest but continued to expand dramatically in the West where rural free delivery was not yet available. The decline in numbers continued nationwide throughout the 20th century, however. By 1966 the number of fourth-class post offices had fallen to 8,401, less than two-thirds the number of third-class post offices in that year.

The political connections of fourth-class postmasters led to strong political resistance to RFD, beginning with remonstrations to Congress over an initial RFD experiment in Carroll County, Maryland in 1899-1900. Fourth-class postmasters and star route operators organized petition drives against the introduction of RFD in their territories and were often successful in slowing its advance. However, pressure from rural residents seeking the convenience of home mail delivery ultimately outweighed the postmasters' influence. Some politicians sought to avoid the conflict by urging the Post Office Department to establish RFD in their districts without closing the fourth-class post offices. A rule that banned RFD to addresses within half a mile of an existing post office was widely flouted. Nonetheless, the effects on post offices were dramatic; the number of post offices nationwide fell by 18,000 from 1901 to 1912. By 1974, the last year for which the Postmaster General published such numbers, there were only 5,883 fourth-class post offices remaining.

The monetary threshold for the fourth-class designation rose in the course of the 20th century, reaching $2,160 in 1964. Although the classification as "fourth-class" ended in the 1970s following the Postal Reorganization Act of 1970, some former fourth-class post offices remain in operation. The vast majority of those that once existed, however, have been discontinued.

== Works cited ==
- Blevins, Cameron (2021). Paper Trails: The US Post and the Making of the American West. Oxford University Press. ISBN 9780190053673.
- Fuller, Wayne E. (1964). RFD: The Changing Face of Rural America. Indiana University Press.
- Fuller, Wayne E. (1972). The American Mail: Enlarger of the Common Life. University of Chicago Press. ISBN 0226268845.
- Henkin, David M. (2006). The Postal Age: The Emergence of Modern Communications in Nineteenth-Century America. University of Chicago Press. ISBN 9780226327204.
