= Turkey Hill Grange Hall =

- U.S. National Register of Historic Places
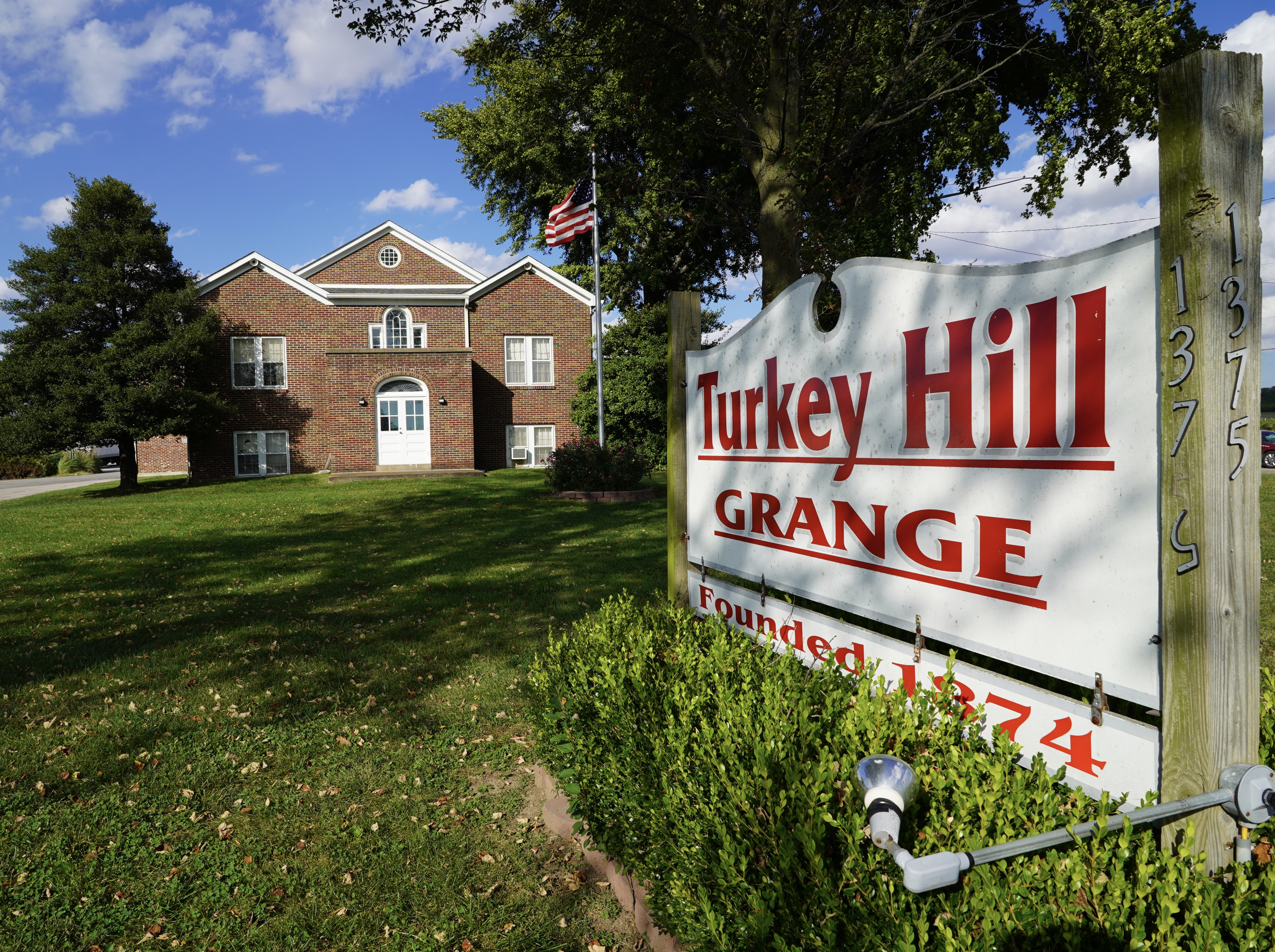

- Location within Illinois Location within the United States
- Location: 1375 E. IL 15, Belleville, Illinois
- Coordinates: 38°28′40″N 89°56′23″W
- Built: 1937
- Architect: Rubach & Weisenstein
- Architectural style: Classical Revival
- NRHP reference No.: 16000902
- Added to NRHP: December 27, 2016

The Turkey Hill Grange Hall is a historic Grange hall located at 1375 E. Illinois Route 15 in Belleville, Illinois. Built in 1937, the hall was the third used by the Turkey Hill Grange #1370, which was founded in 1874. As part of the National Grange, the Turkey Hill chapter served both as a political advocacy group for farmers' interests and a social group for isolated rural residents. While the 1937 hall follows the national organization's suggestions for Grange hall design, the chapter also hired local architecture firm Rubach & Weisenstein to create the building's Neoclassical design, an uncommon practice for a Grange hall. The hall is still in use by the Grange, which is the oldest Grange chapter in St. Clair County; the hall itself is one of the few historic Grange halls in Illinois still standing and in good condition.

The hall was added to the National Register of Historic Places on December 27, 2016.
