= Hotel Belleville =

Historic building in Belleville, Illinois, US

- U.S. National Register of Historic Places
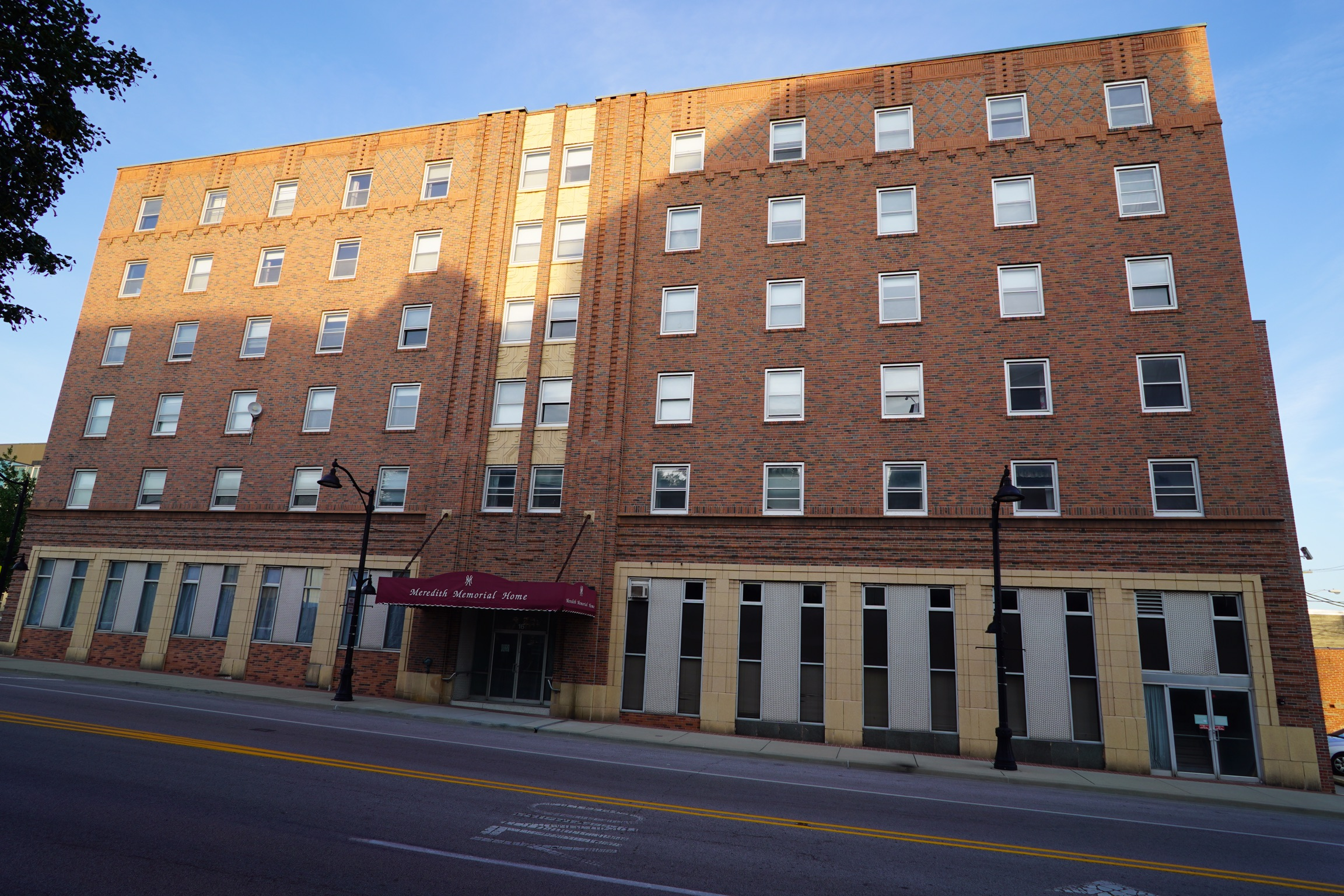

- Location within Illinois Location within the United States
- Location: 16 S. Illinois St., Belleville, Illinois
- Coordinates: 38°30′47″N 89°59′03″W
- Built: 1930-31
- Architect: Manske & Bartling
- Architectural style: Art Deco
- NRHP reference No.: 100002574
- Added to NRHP: June 20, 2018

Hotel Belleville is a historic hotel building at 16 S. Illinois Street in Belleville, Illinois. The hotel was built in 1930–31 to replace the city's previous hotel, the Belleville House; like its predecessor, the hotel marketed itself as the most luxurious and modern hotel in Belleville. Architects Manske & Bartling designed the building in the Art Deco style; their design included first-floor window bays with terra cotta blocks, brick pilasters above the entrance, ornamental brickwork on the upper floors, and a parapet. The hotel's amenities included a restaurant and cocktail lounge, banquet and event space, office space for community organizations, and storefronts for local businesses. In the decades after it opened, the building served both as a center of Belleville's social life and a home for regional conventions. The hotel operated until 1961, when it was converted to an assisted living facility for the elderly.

The building was added to the National Register of Historic Places on June 20, 2018.
