= Pennsylvania Avenue Historic District (East St. Louis, Illinois) =

Historic district in Illinois, United States

- U.S. National Register of Historic Places
- U.S. Historic district
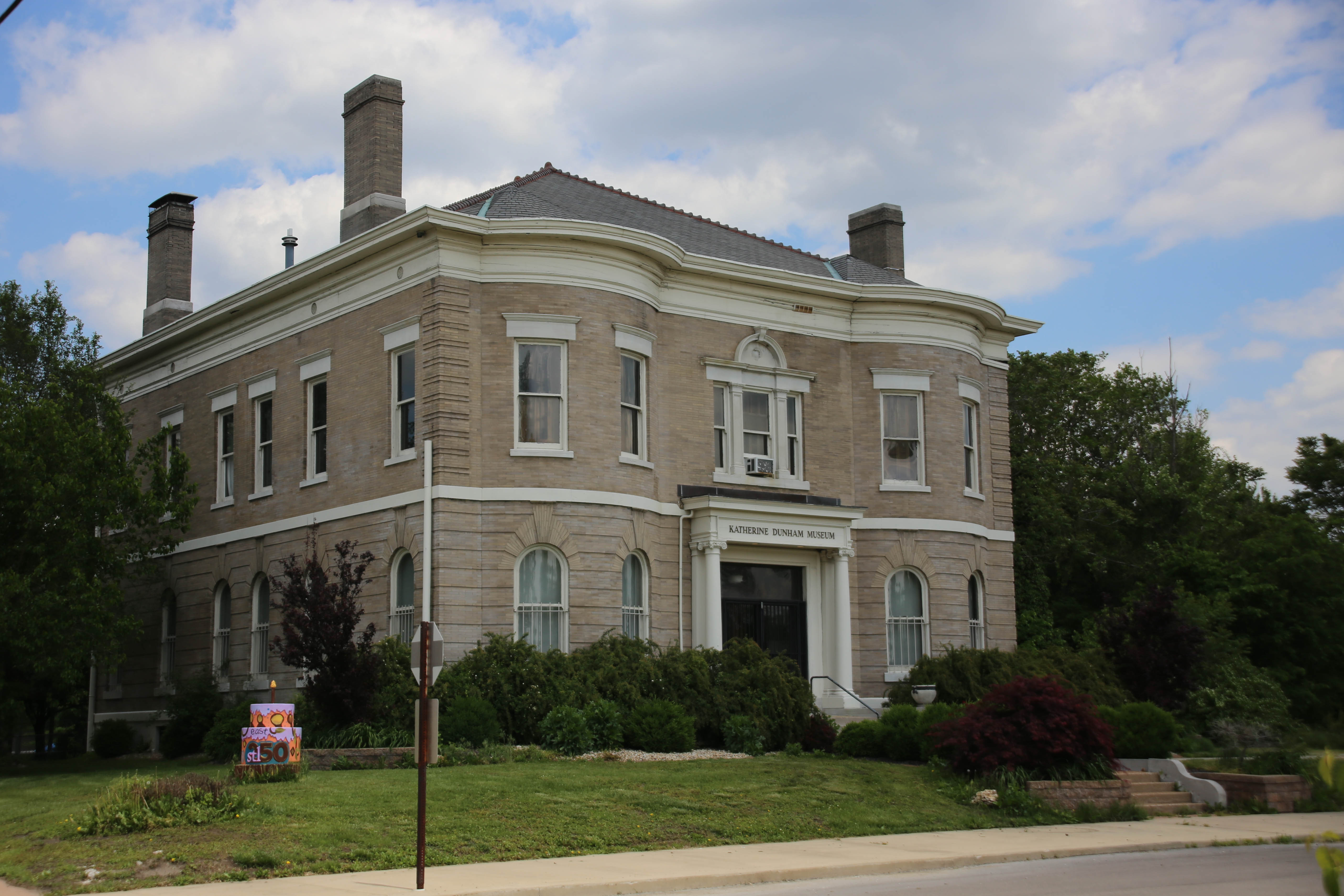
- The Katherine Dunham Museum at 1005 Pennsylvania Avenue

- Location within Illinois Location within the United States
- Location: Pennsylvania Ave., East St. Louis, Illinois
- Coordinates: 38°37′42″N 90°8′39″W
- Area: 2.9 acres (1.2 ha)
- Architectural style: Colonial Revival, Renaissance Revival, Queen Anne
- NRHP reference No.: 79003166
- Added to NRHP: July 27, 1979

The Pennsylvania Avenue Historic District is a residential historic district located on the 1000 block of Pennsylvania Avenue in East St. Louis, Illinois. The district includes four houses as well as the sites of two demolished homes. The historic district was once a prestigious area of the city known as "Quality Hill", and it contained well-built homes designed in popular architectural styles. However, East St. Louis entered a severe decline due to the loss of its industry, racial discrimination, and a corrupt and mismanaged city government. The historic district suffered the same fate as the city; the district is marked by vacant lots and abandoned buildings, and all but one of the houses had been vacated or demolished by the 1970s.

As of 1979, four houses were still standing in the district; all four are contributing buildings. The Joyce House, located at 1005 Pennsylvania Avenue, is a Renaissance Revival house built in 1901 and designed by Albert B. Frankel. The Katherine Dunham Museum now occupies the house; it is the only house in the district which is still occupied. The Malburn M. Stephens House, located at 1010 Pennsylvania Avenue, is a Georgian Revival house built in 1902; its namesake owner served as mayor of East St. Louis for 22 years. The Thomas L. Fekete House, located at 1018 Pennsylvania Avenue, is a vernacular house built in 1896. The sites of two demolished houses, the Reid-Nims House and Derleth-McLean House, are included in the district as non-contributing sites.

The district was added to the National Register of Historic Places on July 27, 1979.
