= St. Libory, Illinois =

St. Libory
- Village
- Location of St. Libory in Clair County, Illinois.
- Coordinates: 38°21′48″N 89°42′49″W
- Country: United States
- State: Illinois
- County: St. Clair

Area
  - Total: 0.97 sq mi (2.52 km^{2})
  - Land: 0.97 sq mi (2.52 km^{2})
  - Water: 0 sq mi (0.00 km^{2})
- Elevation: 417 ft (127 m)

Population (2020)
  - Total: 628
  - Density: 646.0/sq mi (249.42/km^{2})
- Time zone: UTC-6 (CST)
  - Summer (DST): UTC-5 (CDT)
- ZIP code: 62282
- Area code: 618
- FIPS code: 17-66989
- GNIS feature ID: 2399167

St. Libory or Saint Libory is a village in St. Clair County, Illinois, United States. As of the 2020 census, St. Libory had a population of 628.

== Geography ==
According to the 2010 census, St. Libory has a total area of 0.95 square miles (2.46 km^{2}), all land.

== Demographics ==
Historical population
Census	Pop.	Note	%±
1900	220		—
1910	328		49.1%
1920	289		−11.9%
1930	269		−6.9%
1940	296		10.0%
1950	324		9.5%
1960	346		6.8%
1970	448		29.5%
1980	549		22.5%
1990	525		−4.4%
2000	583		11.0%
2010	615		5.5%
2020	628		2.1%
U.S. Decennial Census

At the 2000 census, there were 583 people, 213 households and 158 families residing in the village. The population density was 618.1 inhabitants per square mile (238.6/km^{2}). There were 222 housing units at an average density of 235.4 per square mile (90.9/km^{2}). The racial makeup of the village was 98.28% White, 0.17% African American, and 1.54% from two or more races. Hispanic or Latino of any race were 0.34% of the population.

There were 213 households, of which 40.8% had children under the age of 18 living with them, 60.1% were married couples living together, 10.3% had a female householder with no husband present, and 25.8% were non-families. 22.5% of all households were made up of individuals, and 12.2% had someone living alone who was 65 years of age or older. The average household size was 2.74 and the average family size was 3.23.

Age distribution was 28.6% under the age of 18, 7.9% from 18 to 24, 28.5% from 25 to 44, 20.8% from 45 to 64, and 14.2% who were 65 years of age or older. The median age was 36 years. For every 100 females, there were 85.7 males. For every 100 females age 18 and over, there were 85.7 males.

The median household income was $50,625, and the median family income was $56,625. Males had a median income of $37,273 versus $28,056 for females. The per capita income for the village was $20,024. About 3.5% of families and 6.0% of the population were below the poverty line, including 8.6% of those under age 18 and 6.5% of those age 65 or over.

== Registered historic places ==
- Rutter Store
