= Satellite Broadcasting and Communications Association =

The Satellite Broadcasting and Communications Association (SBCA) is the national trade organization representing the consumer satellite (direct broadcast satellite) industry in the United States, including the two largest service providers, DirecTV and DISH Network, manufacturers, installers, and distributors of satellite equipment.

== Background ==
Its representatives intervene legally and legislatively against taxes, fees, and ordinances that would restrict the installation and use of satellite antennas. For example, it threatened a lawsuit to defeat an ordinance in Omaha, Nebraska that would have required a fee for satellite dish inspections. The organization also offers education programs to certify satellite installers. The organization was founded on December 2, 1986, as a merger of the Society for Private and Commercial Earth Stations (SPACE) and the Direct Broadcast Satellite Association (DBSA).

== See also ==
- Satellite Broadcasting and Communications Association v. FCC
