= Tiedemann House =

Historic house in Illinois, United States

- U.S. National Register of Historic Places
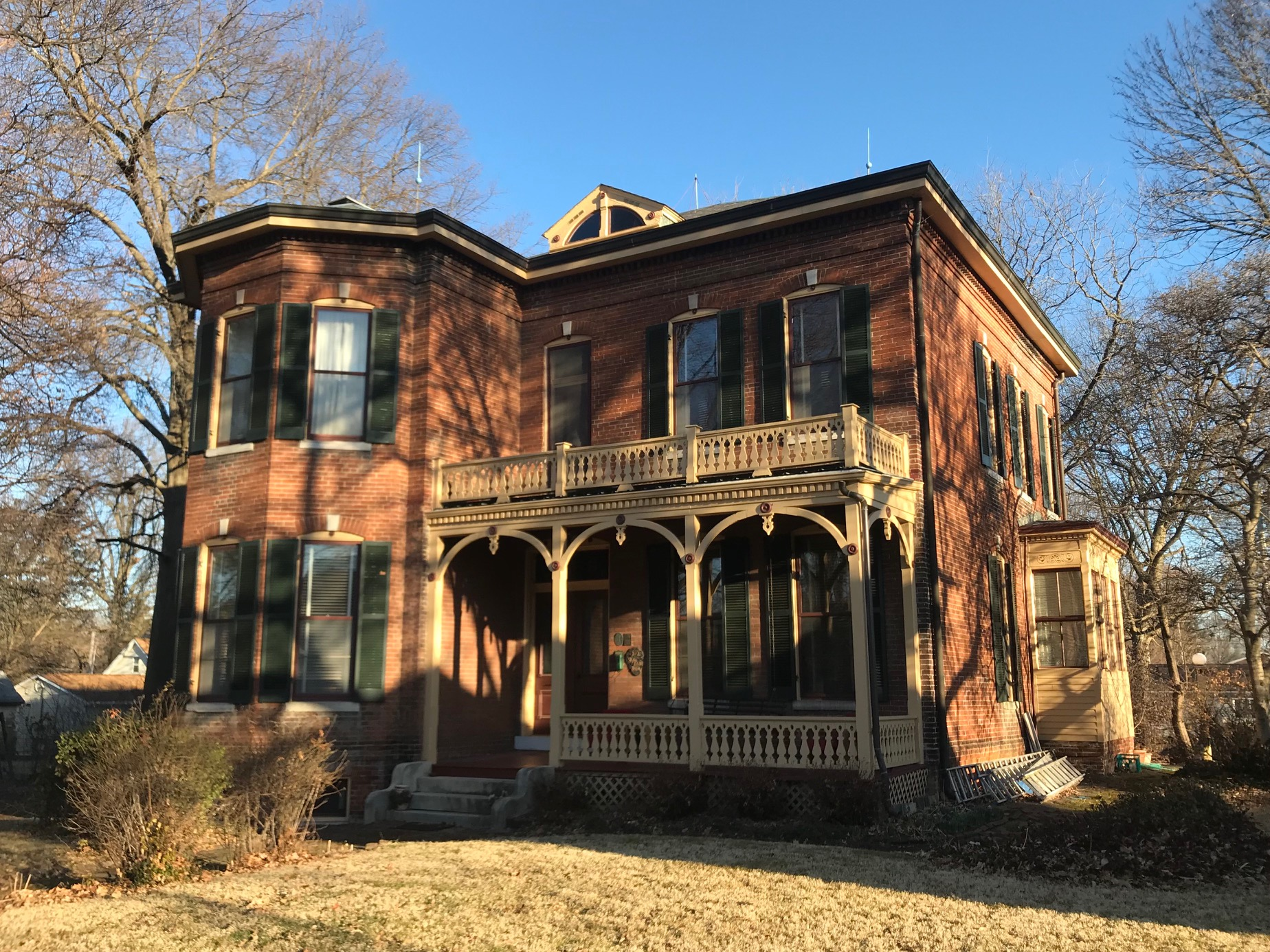

- Location within Illinois Location within the United States
- Location: 212 W. Washington St., O'Fallon, Illinois
- Coordinates: 38°35′36″N 89°54′48″W
- Built: 1884
- Architect: Henry E. Peipers
- Architectural style: Italianate, Queen Anne
- NRHP reference No.: 100005233
- Added to NRHP: May 29, 2020

The Tiedemann House is a historic house at 212 W. Washington St. in O'Fallon, Illinois. The house was built in 1884 for Ernst Tiedemann, a local merchant and a member of the city's board of trustees. Architect Henry E. Peipers of St. Louis designed the house using elements of the Italianate and Queen Anne styles. The house's Italianate features include its front porch, the three-sided bay window on its front facade, and its segmental arch windows. Its Queen Anne influence can be seen in the wooden balustrade on its porch and the gabled dormers with half-moon windows on each side of its hip roof.

The house was added to the National Register of Historic Places on May 29, 2020.
