= Homicide Studies =

- Discipline: Criminology
- Language: English
- Edited by: Jesenia Pizarro

Publication details
- History: 1979-present
- Publisher: SAGE Publications
- Frequency: Quarterly
- Impact factor: 1.63 (2020)

Standard abbreviations
- ISO 4: Homicide Stud.

Indexing
- ISSN: 1088-7679 (print); 1552-6720 (web)
- LCCN: 97652850
- OCLC no.: 34716238

Links
- Journal homepage; Online access; Online archive

Homicide Studies is a peer-reviewed academic journal covering the study of homicide. The editor-in-chief is Jesenia Pizarro (Arizona State University). It was established in 1997 and is currently published by SAGE Publications.

== Abstracting and indexing ==
Homicide Studies is abstracted and indexed in Scopus and the Social Sciences Citation Index. According to the Journal Citation Reports, its 2020 impact factor is 1.63, ranking it 30 out of 50 journals in the category "Criminology and Penology".
