= Blair Historic District =

Historic district in Illinois, United States

- U.S. National Register of Historic Places
- U.S. Historic district
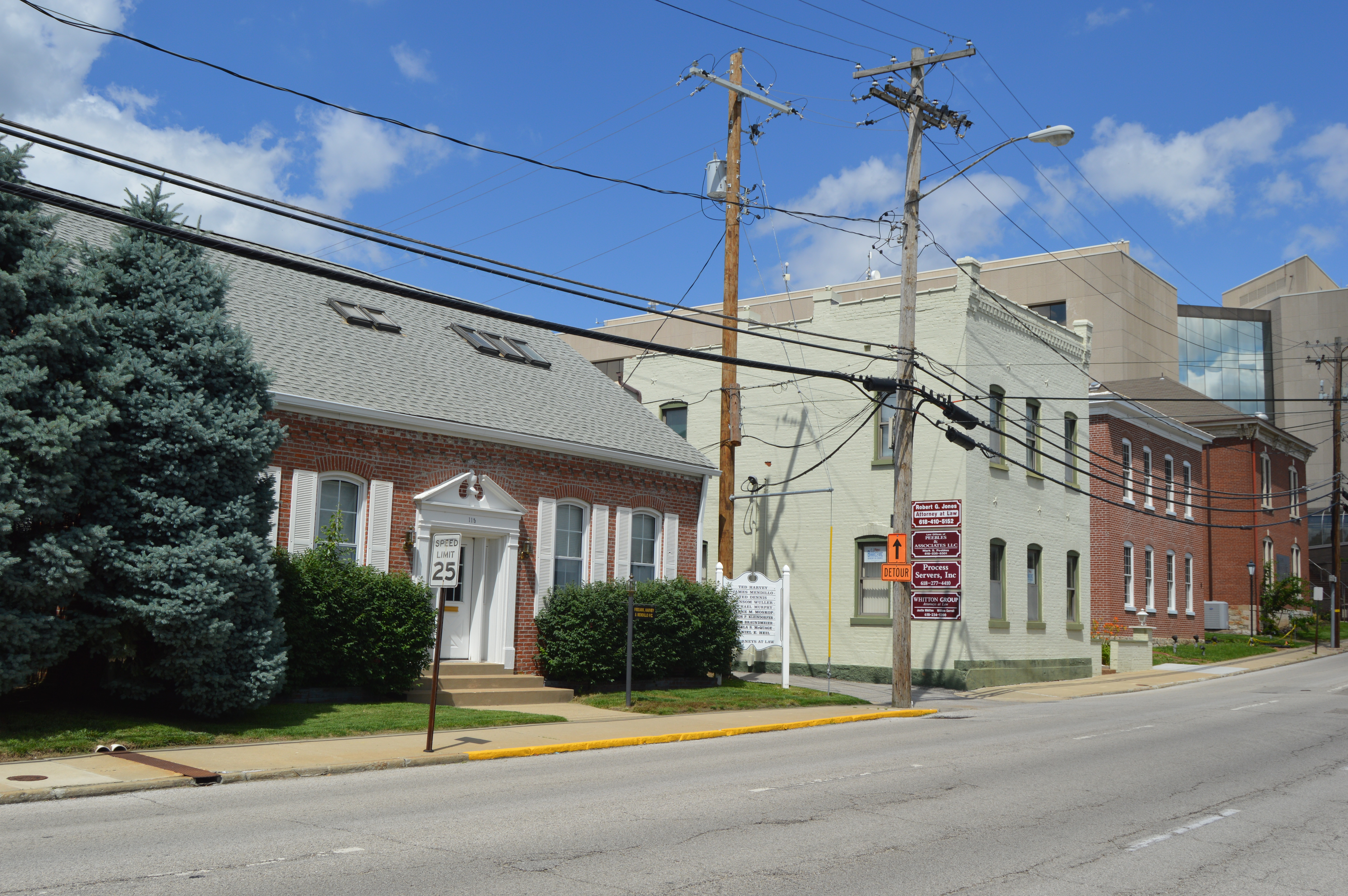
- Washington Street

- Location within Illinois Location within the United States
- Location: Parts of 1st, 2nd, 3rd, A, B, High, Illinois, Main, and Washington Sts. in Belleville
- Coordinates: 38.55098°N 90.036716°W
- NRHP reference No.: 15000523
- Added to NRHP: September 18, 2015

The Blair Historic District is a historic district located in downtown Belleville, Illinois. The district encompasses a mainly commercial area on the west side of the downtown area; it includes 78 buildings, 57 of which are contributing buildings. The entire district is located within the original plat of the city, which was established following a land donation from George Blair in 1813. The oldest buildings in the district date to circa 1850; development continued from then on into the early twentieth century. Most buildings in the district are two-part brick commercial blocks designed in popular contemporary styles such as the Italianate, Second Empire, Classical Revival, and Romanesque Revival. The Reichert Business Block, a three-story structure at 200 West Main Street, has a particularly significant Second Empire design; the building features a mansard roof with dormers and a decorative cornice and has been described as the district's most elaborate building. Two Classical Revival buildings, the 1911 United States Post Office Building and the 1924 Turner Hall, also have a commanding presence in the district; the post office was designed by Supervising Architect James Knox Taylor.

The district was added to the National Register of Historic Places on September 18, 2015.
