= Marissa Academy =

- U.S. National Register of Historic Places
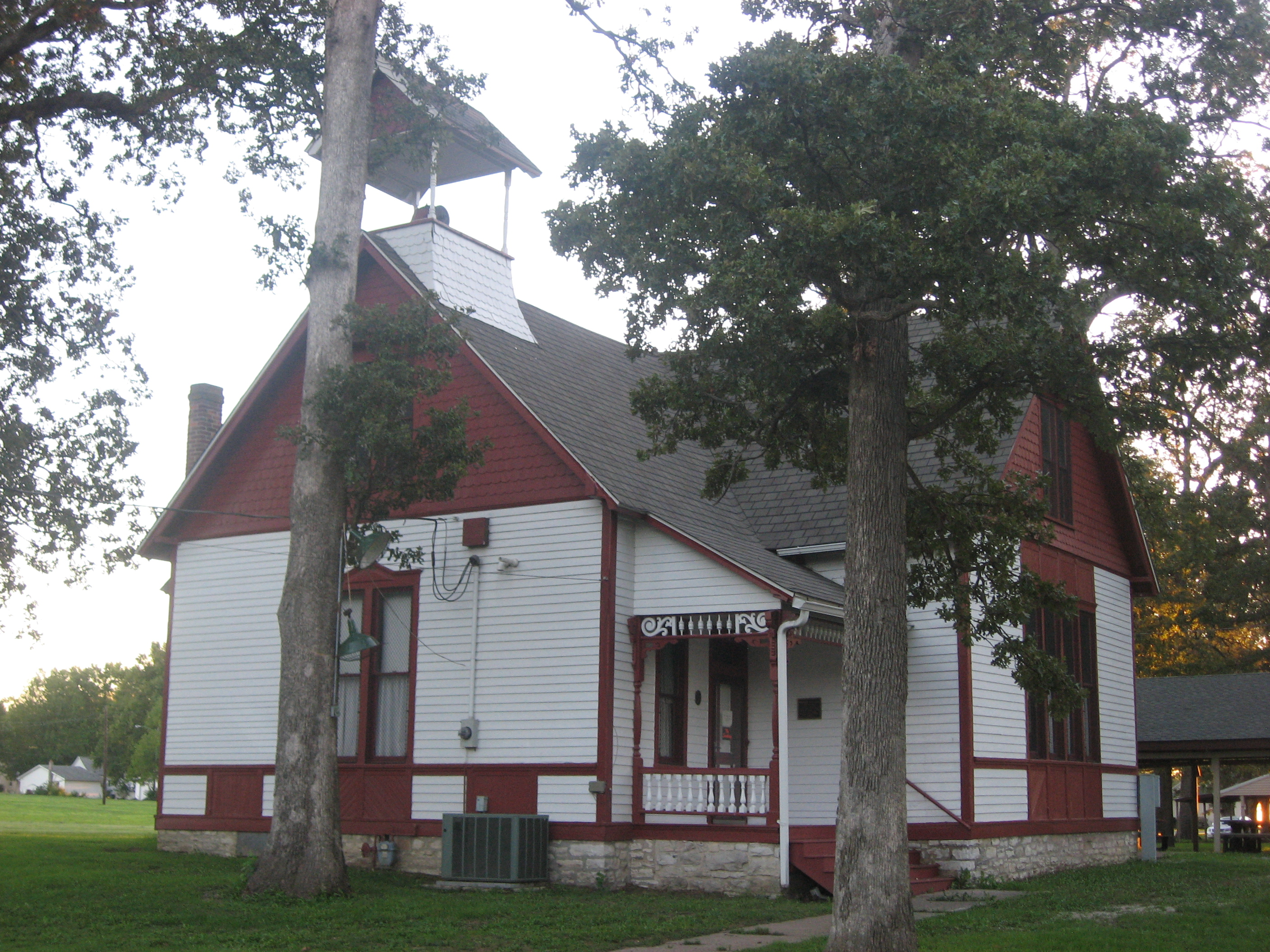

- Location within Illinois Location within the United States
- Location: 610 S. Main St., Marissa, Illinois
- Coordinates: 38°14′27″N 89°45′16″W
- Area: less than one acre
- Built: 1891
- Architectural style: Queen Anne
- NRHP reference No.: 94001267
- Added to NRHP: October 28, 1994

The Marissa Academy is a historic school building located at 610 S. Main St. in Marissa, Illinois. The building was built in 1891 for the Marissa Academy, a college preparatory academy which had graduated its first class two years prior. The private school was the first college preparatory school in the area. Graduating students at the academy could enroll at Monmouth College without taking a qualifying examination under a special arrangement. In 1900, the academy closed after a public high school opened in Marissa. The building has since been used as a meeting hall for community groups and as additional space for Marissa's elementary school. It is now the headquarters of the Marissa Historical and Genealogical Society.

The building was added to the National Register of Historic Places on October 28, 1994.

There was a devastating fire on January 15, 2015, which destroyed most of the building and damaged much of the historical artifacts inside. The historical and genealogical society have set up shop in the old dollar store in Marissa. As yet they don't have all salvaged items (books, files) back from Smoke Services, but all of the newspaper microfilm and a new reader printer on which to view it are at the new facility.
