= Union Trust Bank Company Building =

- U.S. National Register of Historic Places
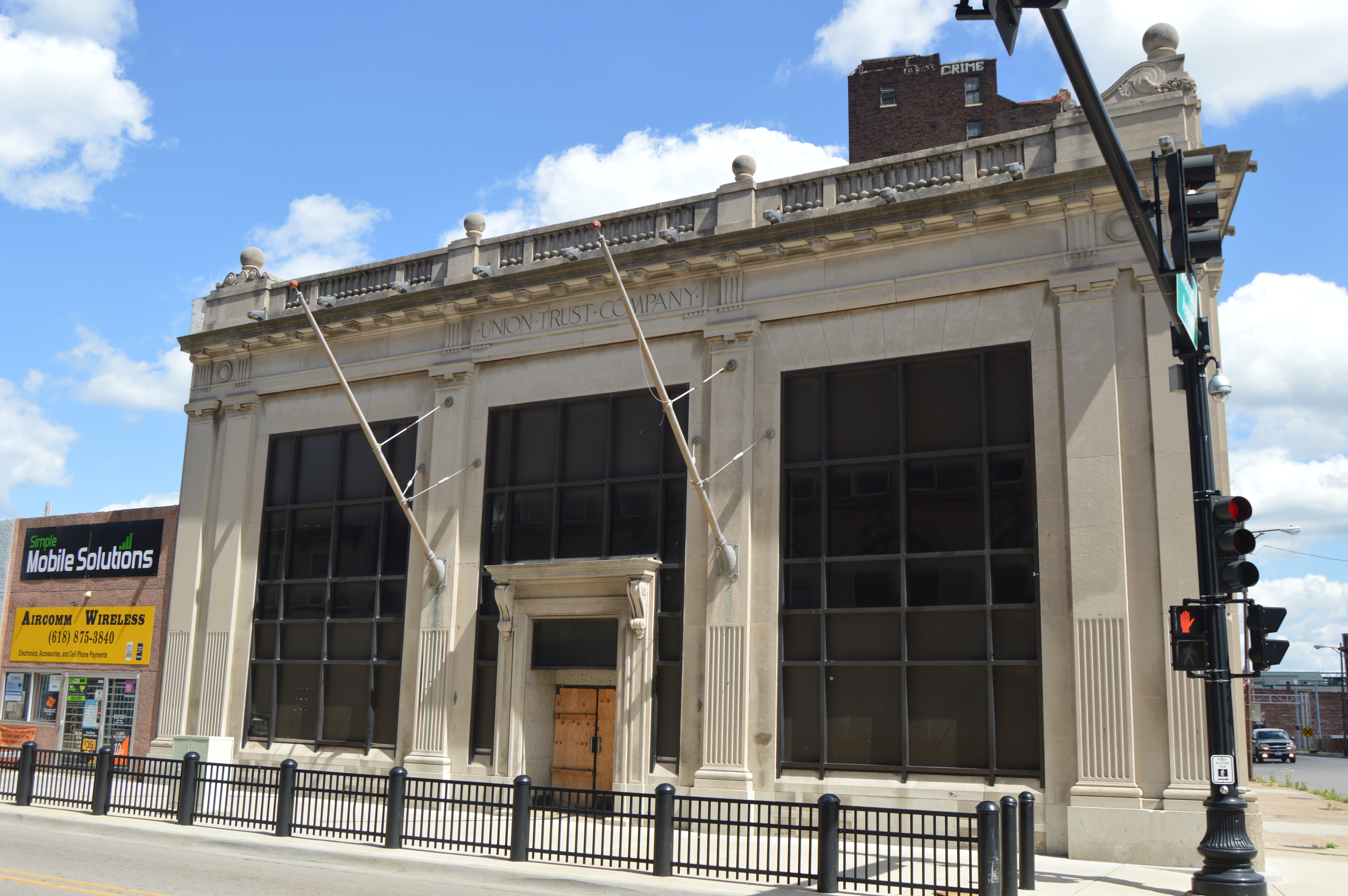
- Front, with the Spivey Building in the background

- Location within Illinois Location within the United States
- Location: 200 Collinsville Ave., East St. Louis, Illinois
- Coordinates: 38°37′37″N 90°9′34″W
- Built: 1922-26
- Architectural style: Classical Revival
- NRHP reference No.: 14000255
- Added to NRHP: May 27, 2014

The Union Trust Bank Company Building is a historic bank building at 200 Collinsville Avenue in downtown East St. Louis, Illinois.

== Background ==
Built from 1922 to 1926, the building housed the Union Trust & Savings Bank, which was founded in 1901 by August Schlafly. Architect Thomas Imbs designed the Classical Revival building. The building opened after the 1917 race riot and a series of corruption scandals in East St. Louis, and its construction marked a turnaround for the struggling city. The new building inspired confidence in the city's downtown, which added several landmark buildings were in the ensuing decade.

The building was added to the National Register of Historic Places on May 27, 2014. It is the only survivor of the city's two Classical Revival banks.
