= George Draser Jr. Houses =

Historic house in Illinois, United States

- U.S. National Register of Historic Places
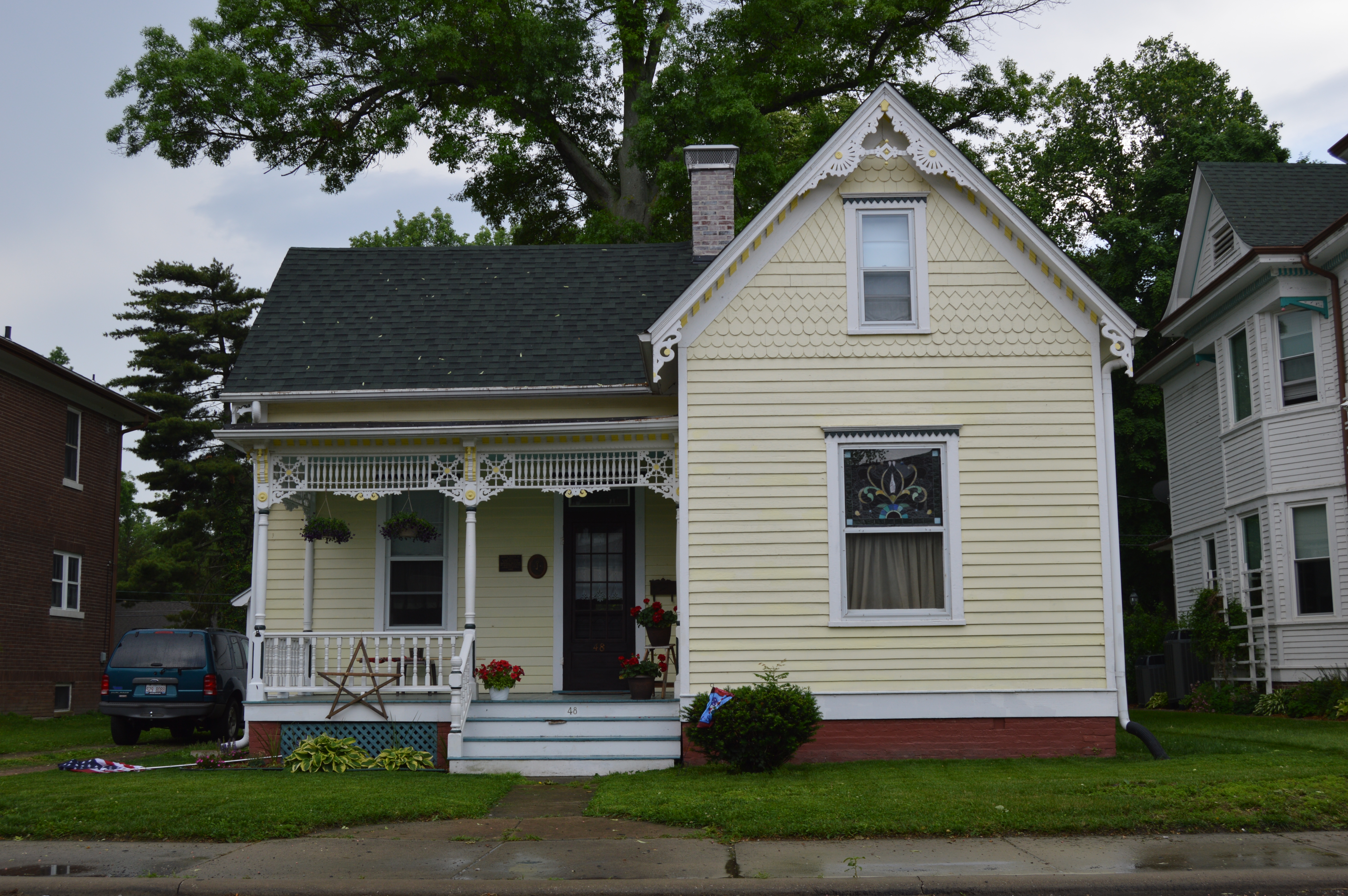
- 48 W. Main

- Location within Illinois Location within the United States
- Location: 48 and 52 W. Main St., Mascoutah, Illinois
- Coordinates: 38°29′24″N 89°47′59″W
- Area: less than one acre
- Built: 1885, 1904
- Architect: Draser, George Jr.
- Architectural style: Queen Anne
- NRHP reference No.: 00000474
- Added to NRHP: May 11, 2000

The George Draser Jr. Houses are a pair of neighboring houses located at 48 and 52 W. Main St. in Mascoutah, Illinois. The houses are both Queen Anne structures designed and built by local architect George Draser Jr. The house at 48 W. Main St. is a one-story cottage known locally as the Doll House due to its size. The house's design features gables with patterned shingles and decorative spindlework at the porch frieze and the peak of the gables. The house at 52 W. Main St. is a full-size house which Draser built for himself and his family. The house features a tower topped by a finial at its northeast corner, a large gable on its rear facade, and a hipped roof with cross gables and a small dormer. The entrance to the house is located within a porch supported by Ionic columns; a pediment tops the porch above the doorway.

The houses were added to the National Register of Historic Places on May 11, 2000.
