= Satellite Broadcasting & Communications Ass'n v. FCC =

- Court: United States Court of Appeals for the Fourth Circuit
- Full case name: Satellite Broadcasting and Communications Association v. FCC
- Argued: September 25, 2001
- Decided: December 7, 2001
- Citation: 275 F.3d 337

Court membership
- Judges sitting: Hiram Emory Widener Jr., Paul V. Niemeyer, M. Blane Michael

Case opinions
- Majority: Michael, joined by a unanimous court

Laws applied
- Satellite Home Viewer Improvement Act of 1999 (SHVIA)

Satellite Broadcasting and Communications Association v. FCC, 275 F.3d 337 (4th Cir. 2001) was a case decided by the United States Court of Appeals for the Fourth Circuit. Congress required satellite television carriers to carry all requesting local broadcast stations in the market where the carrier voluntarily decides to carry one local station in order to, in part, preserve a multiplicity of local broadcast outlets for over-the-air-viewers who do not subscribe either to satellite or cable service.

== Background ==
=== Satellite Broadcasting and Communications Association ===
"We are delighted that the SBCA Board of Directors has agreed to form a Foundation. Our industry has a presence in every state," said SBCA Executive Director, Joe Widoff. "Workers and their families live in thousands of communities throughout the country and the goal of the Foundation is to help meet the needs of these communities in meaningful ways."

== Detail ==
The Fourth Circuit acknowledged that both DBS and cable television operators engage in speech protected by the First Amendment when making channel and content selections. However, the court endorsed the holding in Turner that preserving "free" broadcast television constituted a content-neutral measure that imposes only incidental burdens on speech sufficient to pass muster using intermediate First Amendment scrutiny. The court held that imposing mandatory carriage requirements on satellite television operators furthers an important, narrowly drawn governmental interest:

1. preserving a multiplicity of local broadcast outlets; and
2. preventing the grant of a compulsory copyright license from undermining broadcast television competition, an outcome that could occur should DBS operators deprive their customers access to non-network broadcast stations.

=== Congress Options ===
- It could have decided to give satellite carriers a station-by-station copyright license that could be used free of carriage obligations(4th Cir. 2001)
- The other choice was to impose the carry one, carry all rule in order to create a market-by-market copyright license(4th Cir. 2001)

The Supreme Court has said that the "principal inquiry in determining content neutrality...is whether the government has adopted a regulation of speech because of [agreement or] disagreement with the message it conveys". This inquiry involves two steps.

- First: we must examine the plain terms of the regulation to see whether, on its face, the regulation confers benefits or imposes burdens based upon the content of the speech it regulates. if it does not, we then ask whether the regulation's manifest purpose is to regulate speech because of the message it conveys.

Each satellite carrier providing, under section 122 title 17, secondary transmissions to subscribers located within the local market of a television broadcast station of a primary transmission made by that station shall carry upon request the signals of all television broadcast stations located with in that local market.

we disagree. SHVIA's carriage obligations are not triggered simply by the decision to carry a local broadcast station in a given market. instead, they are triggered by the decision to carry that station by making use of the 122 license. A satellite carrier that privately negotiates the required copyright clearances can retransmit the signal of a local broadcast station without incurring any carriage obligations, but a carrier that retransmits the same signal by means of the statutory copyright license must comply with the carry one, carry all rule. thus, the burdens of the rule do not depend on a satellite carrier's choice of content, but on its decision to transmit that content by using one set of economic arrangements rather that another. Accordingly, we hold that the carry one, carry all rule is content neutral on its face

- Second: We must decide whether the carry one, carry all rule in content-based in it purpose. the satellite carriers claim that the rule has a content-based in its purpose. The satellite carriers claim that the rule has a content-based purpose because it seeks to promote the survival of independent broadcast stations, including affiliates of emerging networks, commercial independent stations, and public broadcasting stations. in support of this claim they cite language from the Conference Report indicating that Congress was concerned that satellite carriers would choose to carry only affiliates of the major networks and that other local broadcasters would be cut off from portions of their potential viewing audiences. in addition, the satellite carriers rely on legislative history suggesting that Congress sought to protect local broadcast stations because those station s provide valuable news and public affairs programming to their communities.

=== Congress Decision ===
Congress chose the second because it feared that cherry picking of major network affiliates within local markets would make it more difficult for non-carried stations in those markets to reach their audiences

Although the conferees expect that subscribers who receive no broadcast signals at all from their satellite service may install antennas or subscribe to cable service in addition to satellite service, the Conference Committee is less sanguine that subscribers who receive network signals and hundreds of other programming choices from their satellite carrier will undertake such trouble and expense to obtain over-the-air signals from independent broadcast stations

=== Difference between Cable and Satellite ===
- Cable systems are local, and nearly all have enough channel capacity to carry all the broadcast stations in their local market and still provide an attractive mix of national and regional non-broadcast programming.
- SatelliteThe satellite carriers, in contrast, currently beam the same 450 to 500 channels throughout the continental United States and thus could not comply with the rule requiring them to retransmit the signals of each of the country's roughly 1,600 local broadcast stations.

=== The proposed legislation violates federal law ===
Additionally, this 10-day notice period runs afoul of federal law as it is a restriction that unreasonably delays or prevents installation, maintenance or use of satellite services. The FCC derived its authority to create the OTARD Rule via the Telecommunications Act of 1996 ("1996 Act"). In Section 207 of the 1996 Act, Congress directed the FCC to "promulgate regulations to prohibit restrictions that impair a viewer's ability to receive video programming services through devices designed for over-the-air reception of television broadcast signals, multichannel multipoint distribution service, or digital broadcast satellite services."

== Implementation ==
=== Satellite Home Viewer Extension and Reauthorization Act ===
==== Historical Introduction ====
Three statutory licenses in the Copyright Act ("Act") govern the retransmission of distant and local over-the-air broadcast station signals. There is one statutory license applicable to cable television systems and two statutory licenses applicable to satellite carriers.which are license 111, license 109, and license 120

==== Then and Now ====
- Recent changes in the video programming marketplace and in video distribution technology are shaking the foundations of the communications industry and the law. The Internet, digital television, and video services using Internet Protocol, have changed the way individuals receive and consume all types of media. Traditional cable and satellite services are losing subscribers and market share to these newer technologies. There is also less interest in programming retransmitted over distant broadcast signals as a result of these new platforms and systems. These fundamental shifts call into question the appropriateness of the current statutory licensing systems in the Act.
- Broadcast television stations are changing the scope and breadth of their services, too. Digital television technology allows broadcasters to provide more programming choices to over-the-air viewers as well as to cable and satellite subscribers. Digital television stations now provide a mix of high definition and standard definition broadcast signals and may possibly offer interactive television services in the future. More importantly, such stations are able to "multicast" by splitting their digital signals into smaller streams each of which may be independently programmed. It is axiomatic that the digital television transmissions are much different than traditional analog transmissions. For that reason, the existing distant signal licenses, whose foundations were built upon analog broadcast technology, cannot readily accommodate the vibrant capabilities of digital television.

=== Extended Signal Importation Opportunities ===
SHVERA provides DBS operators with better opportunities to import distant broadcast signals into markets lacking "local-into-local" delivery of nearby signals and localities unserviced by terrestrial broadcast network signals. local-into-local means that if a satellite customer lives in an area where the satellite company has decided to provide the service, the customer can receive local TV channels. If the company decides that it will not provide local broadcast stations in an area, the consumer may still receive local broadcast stations by using an antenna or basic cable service.

=== Retransmission of Distant Digital Network Signals ===
SHVERA also offers DBS operators the opportunity to deliver distant digital network signals into "digital white areas" where the nearest network broadcaster does not currently offer digital content, or where adequate off-air reception does not occur.

==== Summary ====
The satellite and cable regulatory frameworks attempt to balance a number of longstanding, but potentially conflicting, public policy goals—most notably, localised, competitive provision of video services, support for the creative process, and preservation of free over-the-air broadcast television. They also attempt to balance the interests of the satellite, cable, broadcast, and program content industries. Congress incorporated the sunset provisions in SHVERA because of its concern that market changes could affect these balances. The statutory provisions distinguish between the retransmission of local signals—the broadcast signals of stations located in the same local market as the subscriber—and of distant signals. Provisions block or restrict the retransmission of many distant broadcast signals in order to protect local broadcasters from competition from distant signals and to provide them with a stronger negotiating position vis-à-vis the satellite and cable operators, with the intention of fostering local programming. But the regulatory framework also recognizes that U.S. households benefit from the receipt of certain distant broadcast signals and includes explicit retransmission and copyright rules for these.

== Ruling ==
=== Satellite Home Viewer Improvement Act of 1999 ===
This Act modified the Satellite Home Viewer Act of 1988. SHVIA permits satellite broadcasters to provide local broadcast TV signals to all their subscribers in that local TV station's market. SHVIA also permits satellite broadcasters (satellite broadcasters. 2000–2001) to provide "distant" or national broadcast programming to subscribers. SHIVA Fact Sheet

Famous Quote The Act also imposes a "carry one, carry all" rule, which was designed to "preserve free television for those not served by satellite or cable and to promote widespread dissemination of information from a multiplicity of sources."

Carry one.carry all The National Association of Broadcasters, which did not return requests for comment, is probably going to be unhappy because the FCC plans to allow DirecTV and Dish to down convert broadcasters' HD signals to a less pristine picture resolution for several years. The satellite giants-which combined serve about 30 million pay-TV subscribers-convinced FCC officials that they lacked the channel capacity to provide every eligible station in HD immediately. They insisted that they needed several years to prepare for a full HD carriage requirement. HD signals stress capacity because they take up much more bandwidth than digital signal transmitted at lower resolution. The FCC's HD rules for satellite were far more lenient than the ones originally proposed by FCC chairman Kevin Martin. He started off at full HD carriage in February 2009, coupled with a market-by-market waiver process. Martin scuttled his original plan after DirecTV and Dish Network complained that it was draconian and damaging to their ability to compete with cable. Instead, the FCC decided to give DirecTV and EchoStar until 2013 to carry all stations in HD within any market where they have elected to carry any station's signal in HD format. The "carry one, carry all in HD" principle kicks in when a satellite company starts carrying local signals in HD. DirecTV's decision to carry local TV signals in HD does not force Dish to do likewise in the same market.

=== Circuit Judge ===
Rogers, Circuit Judge: Following enactment of the Telecommunications Act of 1996, the Federal Communications Commission promulgated a rule prohibiting restrictions on certain over-the-air reception devices ("OTARD"). The rule invalidated

[a]ny restriction, including but not limited to any state or local law or regulation, including zoning, land-use or building regulation, or any private covenant, homeowners' association rule or similar restriction on property within the exclusive use or control of the antenna user where the user has a direct or indirect ownership interest in the property that impairs the installation, maintenance, or use of [antennas that are designed to receive direct broadcast satellite service, video programming services via multipoint distribution services, or television broadcast signals]...
