= Rutter Store =

- U.S. National Register of Historic Places
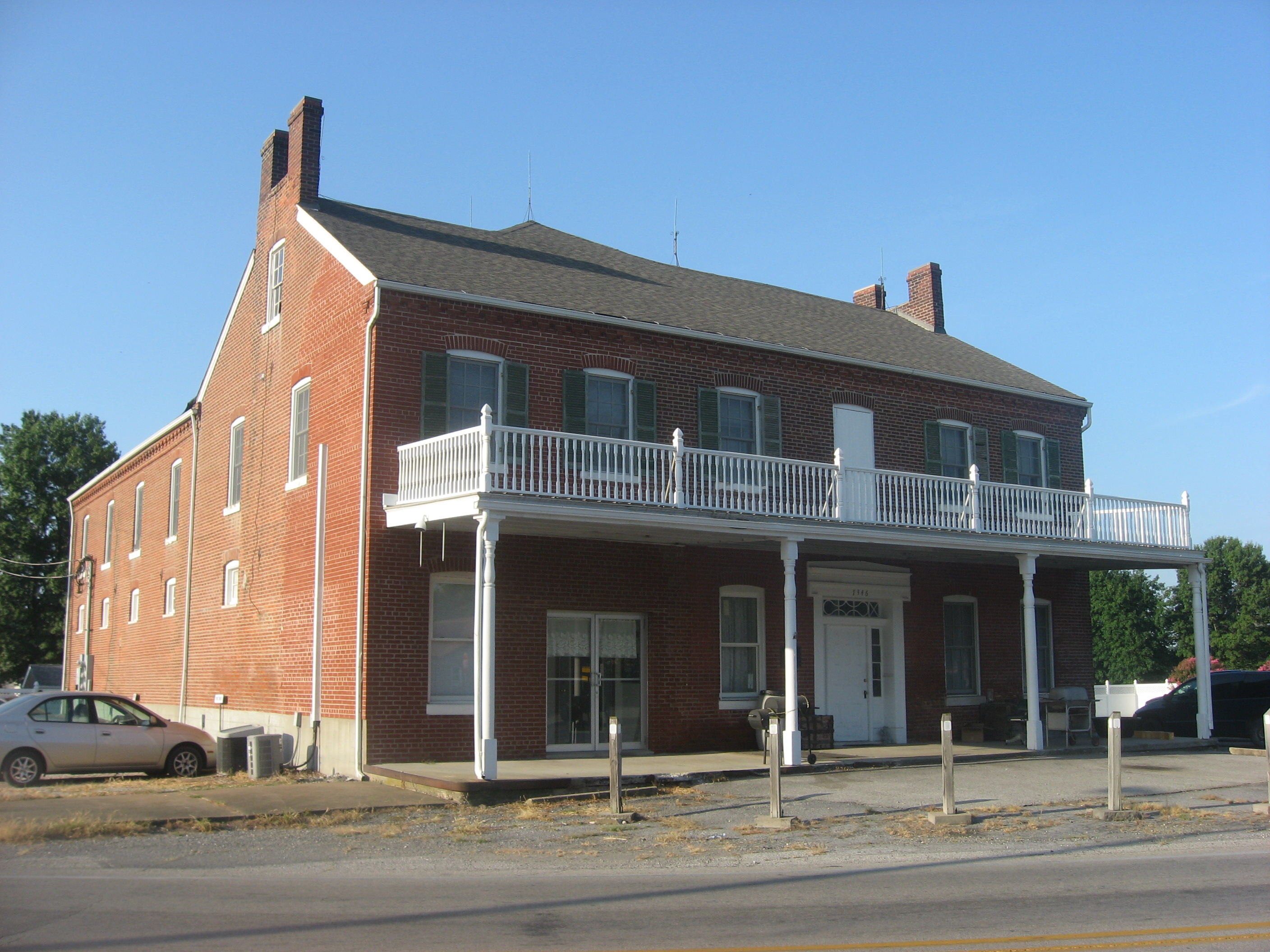

- Location within Illinois Location within the United States
- Location: 7346 IL 15, St. Libory, Illinois
- Coordinates: 38°21′49″N 89°42′48″W
- Area: less than one acre
- Built: 1849
- Built by: Rutter, Heinrich
- NRHP reference No.: 94000436
- Added to NRHP: May 6, 1994

The Rutter Store is a historic commercial building located at 7346 Illinois Route 15 in St. Libory, Illinois. Merchant and German immigrant Heinrich Rutter constructed the building in 1849 as a general store. The building became a commercial and social center for St. Libory, as it house a variety of other businesses in addition to the village's main store. The St. Libory post office became part of the building in 1856 and remained there until 1990, when it moved to a new building. Rutter operated a hotel and a bar in the building from the late 1850s until World War I, and a doctor's office occupied the second floor during the 1870s. The general store closed in 1986, and the building was later converted to a restaurant.

The building was added to the National Register of Historic Places on May 6, 1994.
