= Marissa, Illinois =

Marissa
- Village
- Flag Logo

- Location of Marissa in St. Clair County, Illinois.
- Coordinates: 38°14′46″N 89°45′10″W
- Country: United States
- State: Illinois
- County: St. Clair

Area
  - Total: 7.94 sq mi (20.57 km^{2})
  - Land: 7.21 sq mi (18.68 km^{2})
  - Water: 0.73 sq mi (1.88 km^{2})
- Elevation: 430 ft (130 m)

Population (2020)
  - Total: 1,833
  - Density: 254/sq mi (98.1/km^{2})
- Time zone: UTC-6 (CST)
  - Summer (DST): UTC-5 (CDT)
- ZIP code: 62257
- Area code: 618
- FIPS code: 17-46955
- GNIS feature ID: 2399258
- Website: www.villageofmarissa.com

Marissa is a village in St. Clair County, Illinois, United States. As of the 2020 census, Marissa had a population of 1,833.

== History ==
Before 1700, the Marissa area was inhabited by various Native American tribes. Among them were Kaskaskias, Peorias, Cahokias, Iroquois, and Michiganies. However, the most prevalent in the immediate area were probably the Tamaroas. It is known that just south of Marissa Cemetery, on a hill at 321 Doza Creek Road, a settlement existed as many artifacts have been recovered over the years. Also, there are still the remains of a trail that was used by the tribes as they traveled east and west. Evidence of this can still be seen just north of the dwelling at 132 Doza Creek Road. The three feet deep trench running through the woods was worn by foot and horse traffic, some pulling two pole skids carrying possessions. During the early 1700s, settlers first made their appearance in the region. French hunters and trappers ventured into the area in quest of its plentiful game. One of the first was Elexe Doza, who gave his last name to a creek that lies just south of the village.

The first settlers came to the area around 1805. John Lively had moved his family here from South Carolina and built a log cabin about two miles east of Marissa near Risdon School Road. A second family moved into the area four years later and they too were followed by others. The encroachment of the Indians’ land had begun and, as could be expected, conflicts began to surface. Because of the hostilities, small wooden forts were built by the settlers that afforded them a place to retreat when threats of attack loomed. One of these was constructed on Doza Creek about a ¼ mile north of where it is crossed by the Risdon School Road. Crumbling remains of the fort were reportedly still in existence in the early 1960s, but were destroyed by strip mining. A steady stream of settlers continued, and in 1818, Illinois was granted statehood. The first elementary school opened in the area in 1831.

Starting in the late 1800s and continuing to the present day, one of the largest local industries has been the mining of steam coal. Currently most of the coal mined here is burned to generate electricity.

== Geography ==
According to the 2010 census, Marissa has a total area of 3.523 square miles (9.12 km^{2}), of which 3.35 square miles (8.68 km^{2}) (or 95.09%) is land and 0.173 square miles (0.45 km^{2}) (or 4.91%) is water.

== Demographics ==
Historical population
| Census | Pop. | Note | %± |
|---|---|---|---|
| 1890 | 876 | | — |
| 1900 | 1,086 | | 24.0% |
| 1910 | 2,004 | | 84.5% |
| 1920 | 1,900 | | −5.2% |
| 1930 | 1,630 | | −14.2% |
| 1940 | 1,657 | | 1.7% |
| 1950 | 1,652 | | −0.3% |
| 1960 | 1,722 | | 4.2% |
| 1970 | 2,004 | | 16.4% |
| 1980 | 2,568 | | 28.1% |
| 1990 | 2,375 | | −7.5% |
| 2000 | 2,141 | | −9.9% |
| 2010 | 1,979 | | −7.6% |
| 2020 | 1,833 | | −7.4% |
U.S. Decennial Census

=== 2020 census ===
As of the 2020 census, Marissa had a population of 1,833. The median age was 40.7 years. 24.5% of residents were under the age of 18 and 18.7% of residents were 65 years of age or older. For every 100 females there were 99.7 males, and for every 100 females age 18 and over there were 94.9 males age 18 and over.

0.0% of residents lived in urban areas, while 100.0% lived in rural areas.

There were 785 households in Marissa, of which 29.6% had children under the age of 18 living in them. Of all households, 43.1% were married-couple households, 21.5% were households with a male householder and no spouse or partner present, and 26.8% were households with a female householder and no spouse or partner present. About 31.5% of all households were made up of individuals and 14.3% had someone living alone who was 65 years of age or older.

There were 902 housing units, of which 13.0% were vacant. The homeowner vacancy rate was 3.1% and the rental vacancy rate was 10.2%.

Racial composition as of the 2020 census
| Race | Number | Percent |
|---|---|---|
| White | 1,720 | 93.8% |
| Black or African American | 20 | 1.1% |
| American Indian and Alaska Native | 3 | 0.2% |
| Asian | 0 | 0.0% |
| Native Hawaiian and Other Pacific Islander | 2 | 0.1% |
| Some other race | 4 | 0.2% |
| Two or more races | 84 | 4.6% |
| Hispanic or Latino (of any race) | 29 | 1.6% |

=== 2010 census ===
As of the 2010 census, the population was 1,979.

== Traditions ==
The Marissa Coal Festival is held each year on the second weekend of August. The activities begin Friday evening and run through Sunday night with the crowning of the Festival queen. Sunday afternoon also features a parade that begins at 4:00 pm.

The "Toast of Marissa" is an annual wine tasting event that occurs in November and is sponsored by the Marissa Chamber of Commerce and participating Wineries. Included in the activities is a 5k Grape Stomp Run, a Grape Stomp contest, and a Cookie bake-off.

== Notable people ==
- Warren Hacker, pitcher for the Chicago Cubs, Cincinnati Redlegs, Philadelphia Phillies and Chicago White Sox
- Robert S. Hamilton (1865–1940), Illinois state senator and lawyer
- Bob Heil (October 5, 1940) sounds and radio engineer most well known for creating the template for modern rock sound systems.
