= Spivey Building =

- U.S. National Register of Historic Places
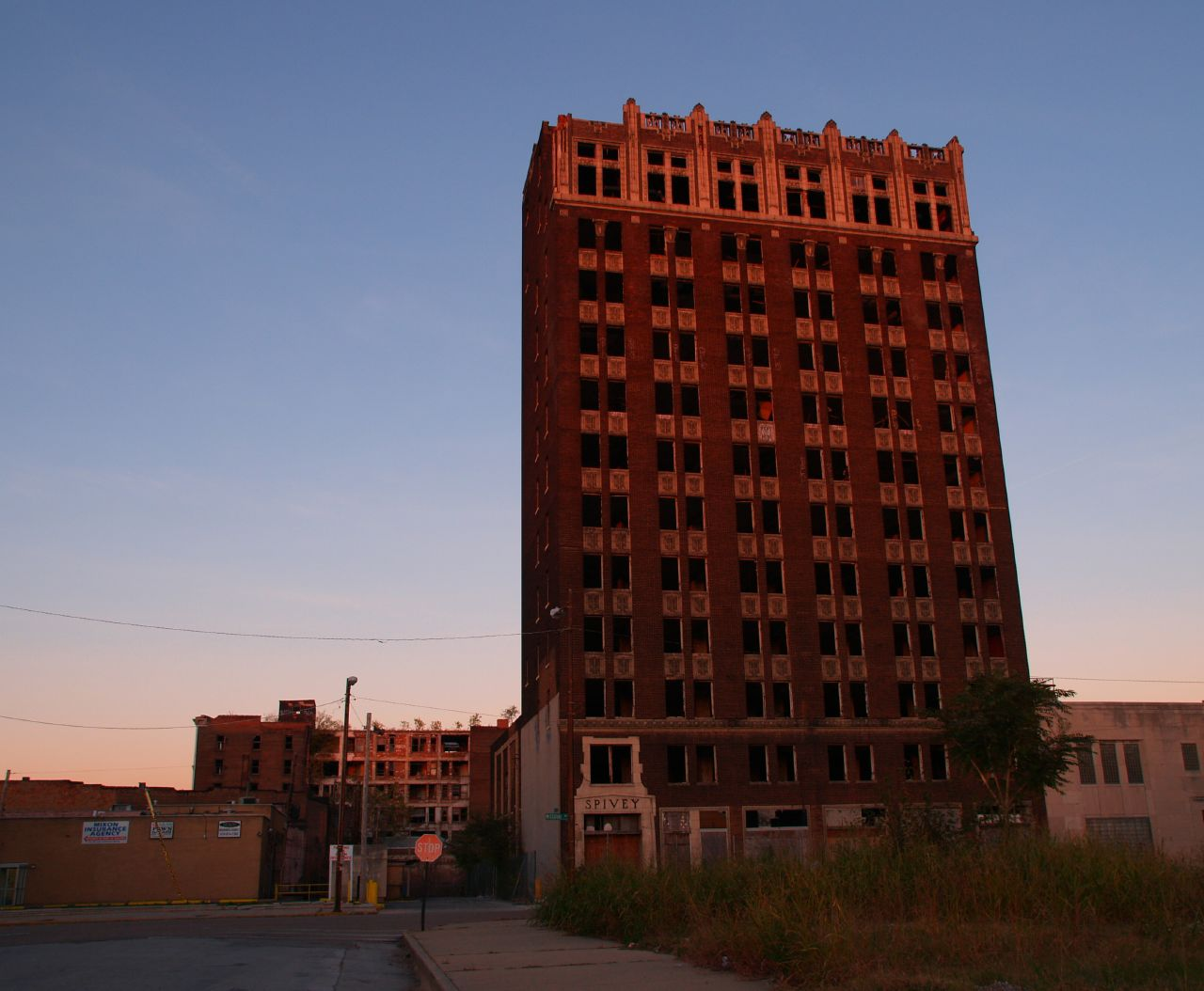
- 2008

- Location within Illinois Location within the United States
- Location: 417 Missouri Ave., East St. Louis, Illinois
- Coordinates: 38°37′36″N 90°9′32″W
- Area: 1.5 acres (0.61 ha)
- Built: 1927
- Built by: Wimmer Contracting Company
- Architect: Albert B. Frankel
- Architectural style: Commercial
- NRHP reference No.: 01001462
- Added to NRHP: January 17, 2002

The Spivey Building is a 12-story skyscraper located at 417 Missouri Avenue in East St. Louis, Illinois. Built in 1927 by newspaper owner Allen Spivey, the building is the only skyscraper ever constructed in East St. Louis. Architect Albert B. Frankel designed the building in the Commercial style. The building's design features terra cotta spandrels separating its windows vertically and brick pier dividing its window bays. The asymmetrical entrance is surrounded by decorative marble piers, and the first two stories are separated from the rest of the building by a cornice and sill. The top of the building features a two-story parapet with terra cotta surrounds at each window and seven capitals at its peak, of which only five remain fully intact. During the height of East St. Louis' prosperity through the 1950s, the building housed the offices of professionals in many fields who were considered among the best in the city. However, the building became a victim of the city's steep economic decline and has been abandoned for several decades. The building’s last tenant moved out around 1980. The building was added to the National Register of Historic Places on January 17, 2002.

In 2025 the NFPO Landmarks Illinois listed the building #4 in their top ten most endangered historic places in the state.

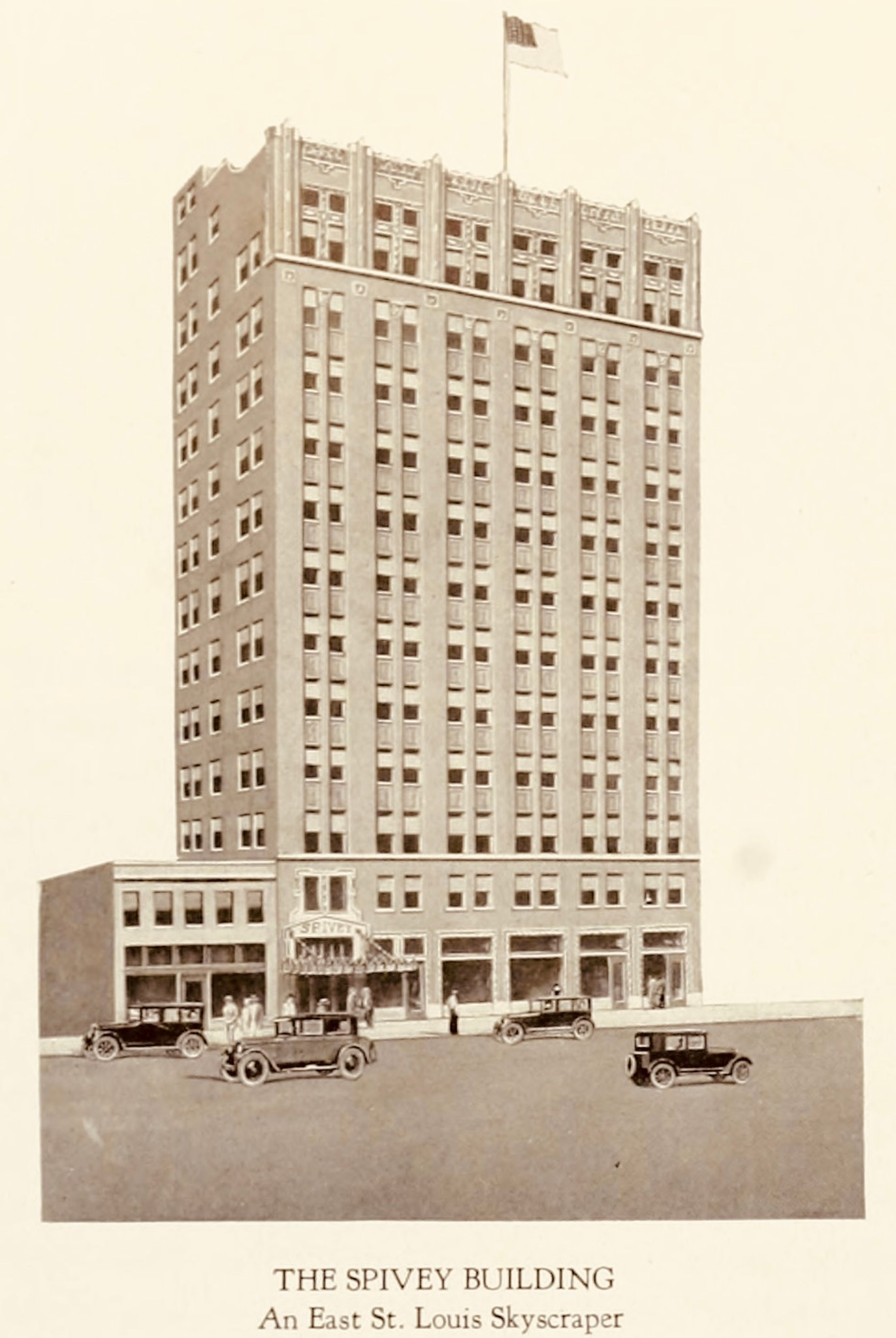
The building seen in the Centennial, McKendree College, with St. Clair County History (1928)

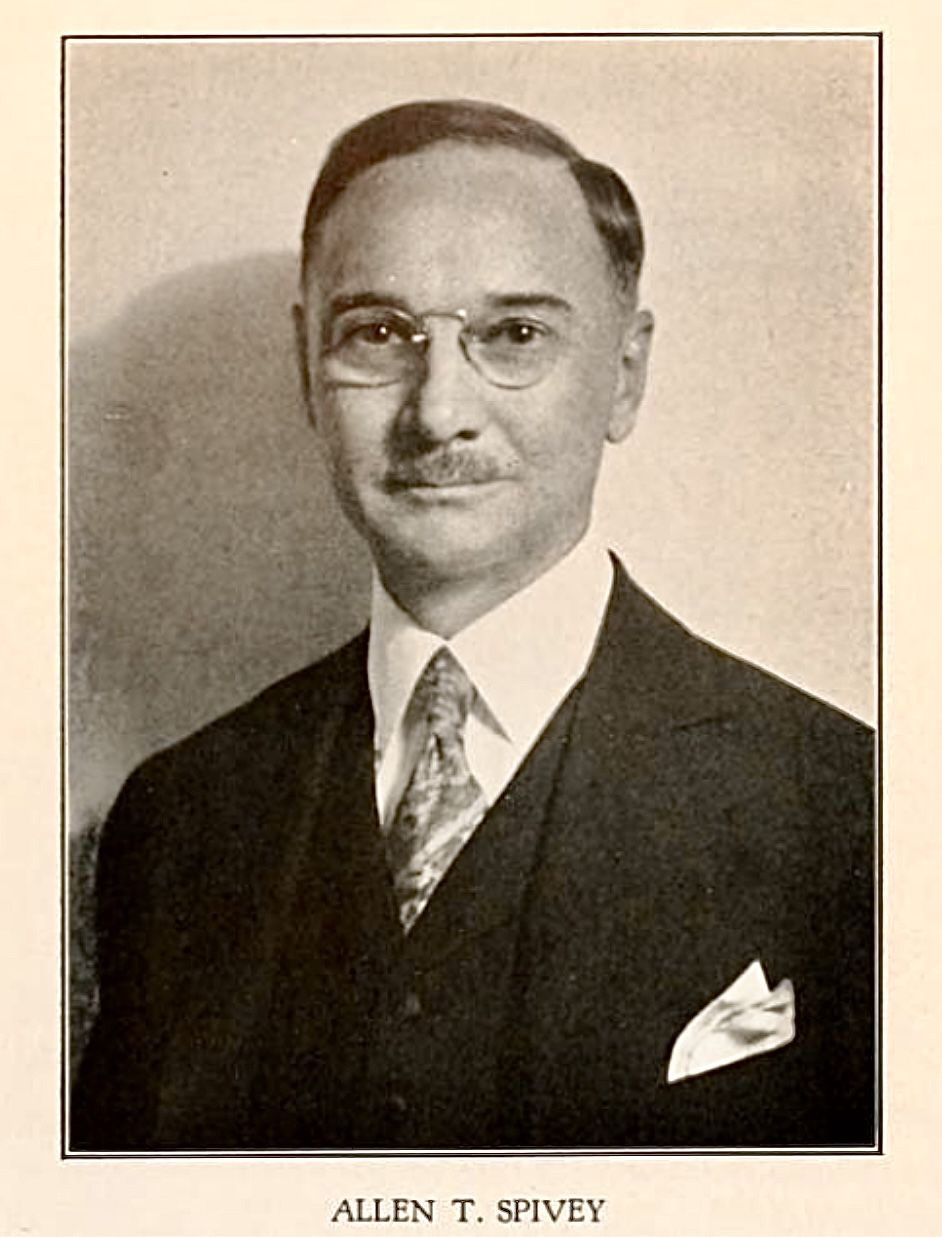
Allen Thomas Spivey (1875-1931) of Old Shawneetown, Illinois
