= Gin Blossoms discography =

- Studio albums: 6
- Extended plays: 2
- Soundtrack albums: 7
- Live albums: 1
- Compilation albums: 4
- Singles: 15
- Video albums: 2

This discography of American alternative rock band Gin Blossoms consists of six studio albums, one live album, two EPs, four compilation albums, and 15 singles.

== Studio albums ==
Year	Album details	Peak chart positions							Certifications (sales thresholds)
Year	Album details	US	US Heat	US Indie	CAN	AUS	NZ	UK	Certifications (sales thresholds)
1989	Dusted: Released: December 1, 1989; Label: San Jacinto; Format:	—	—	—	—	—	—	—	
1992	New Miserable Experience: Released: August 4, 1992; Label: A&M; Format: CD, CS, DI	30	1	—	43	63	—	53	US: 4× Platinum; CAN: Gold
1996	Congratulations… I'm Sorry: Released: February 13, 1996; Label: A&M; Format: CD, CS, DI	10	—	—	8	41	41	42	US: Platinum; CAN: Gold
2006	Major Lodge Victory: Released: August 8, 2006; Label: Hybrid; Format: CD	159	—	10	—	—	—	—	
2010	No Chocolate Cake: Released: September 28, 2010; Label: 429; Format: CD, DI	73	—	14	—	—	—	—	
2018	Mixed Reality: Released: June 15, 2018; Label: Cleopatra; Format: CD, DI	—	—	36	—	—	—	—	
"—" denotes releases that did not chart.

== Live albums ==
Year	Album details
2009	Live in Concert: Released: May 19, 2009; Label: Cleopatra
2009	Just South of Nowhere (Live in Chicago): Released: October 22, 2009; Label: A&M

== Compilations ==
Year	Album details
1999	Outside Looking In: The Best of the Gin Blossoms: Released: October 19, 1999; Label: A&M
2003	The Millennium Collection: The Best of Gin Blossoms: Released: September 23, 2003; Label: A&M
2010	Rarities: Released: January 5, 2010; Label: A&M
2011	Icon: Released: May 23, 2011; Label: A&M/UM^{e}

== EPs ==
Year	Album details
1991	Up and Crumbling: Released: 1991; Label: A&M
1994	Shut Up and Smoke: Released: 1994; Label: A&M

== Singles ==
Year	Title	Peak chart positions										Certifications	Album
Year	Title	US	US Pop	US Main. Rock	US Alt	US Adult Pop	AUS	CAN	ICE	SCO	UK	Certifications	Album
1991	"Allison Road"	—	—	—	—	—	—	—	—	—	—		Up and Crumbling
1992	"Lost Horizons"	—	—	—	—	—	—	—	—	—	—		New Miserable Experience
1993	"Mrs. Rita"	—	—	36	—	—	—	—	—	—	—		New Miserable Experience
1993	"Hey Jealousy"	25	20	4	—	—	28	39	20	40	24	US: Gold	New Miserable Experience
1993	"Until I Fall Away"	— (Note: "Until I Fall Away" did not enter the Billboard Hot 100, but peaked at number 21 on the Hot 100 Airplay chart.)	13	40	13	9	122	35	34	—	—		New Miserable Experience
1993	"Found Out About You"	25	6	5	1	38	94	3	—	51	40		New Miserable Experience
1994	"Allison Road" (re-release)	— (Note: "Allison Road" did not enter the Billboard Hot 100, but peaked at number 24 on the Hot 100 Airplay chart.)	11	20	39	—	—	21	—	—	—		New Miserable Experience
1995	"Til I Hear It from You"	— (Note: The original solo release of "Til I Hear It from You" did not enter the Billboard Hot 100, but peaked at number 8 on the Hot 100 Airplay chart.)	5	4	5	3	137	1	8	29	39		Empire Records: The Soundtrack
1996	"Follow You Down"	9	5	7	6	3	65	1	35	29	30		Congratulations… I'm Sorry
1996	"Til I Hear It from You" (re-release)	9	—	—	—	—	—	—	—	—	—		Congratulations… I'm Sorry
1996	"Day Job"	—	—	29	21	—	—	24	—	—	—		Congratulations… I'm Sorry
1996	"As Long as It Matters"	75	40	—	—	30	142	10	—	—	—		Congratulations… I'm Sorry
1996	"Not Only Numb"	—	—	—	—	—	—	—	—	—	—		Congratulations… I'm Sorry
2006	"Learning the Hard Way"	—	—	—	—	22	—	—	—	—	—		Major Lodge Victory
2006	"Long Time Gone"	—	—	—	—	—	—	—	—	—	—		Major Lodge Victory
2010	"Miss Disarray"	—	—	—	—	—	—	—	—	—	—		No Chocolate Cake
2010	"Wave Bye Bye"	—	—	—	—	—	—	—	—	—	—		No Chocolate Cake
2018	"Break"	—	—	—	—	—	—	—	—	—	—		Mixed Reality
"—" denotes releases that did not chart.

== Soundtracks ==
- Wayne's World 2 Track: "Idiot Summer" (1993)
- Kiss My Ass: Classic Kiss Regrooved Track: "Christine Sixteen" (1994)
- Speed Track: "Soul Deep" (1994)
- Empire Records Track: "'Til I Hear It from You" (1995)
- To the Extreme: America's Fast Track to Rock Track: "My Car" (1998)
- How to Lose a Guy in 10 Days Track: "Follow You Down" (2003)
- Big Star, Small World Track: "Back of a Car" (2006)
- Wonder Park Track: "Mega Pawn King" (2019)

== DVDs ==
- Just South of Nowhere (2003)
- 20th Century Masters – The Best of Gin Blossoms (2004)
