= Outside Looking In: The Best of the Gin Blossoms =

Greatest hits album by Gin Blossoms
- Released: October 19, 1999
- Recorded: 1991–1996
- Genres: Alternative rock; jangle pop; power pop
- Length: 53:32
- Label: A&M
- Producers: Gin Blossoms, John Hampton

Gin Blossoms chronology
Congratulations… I'm Sorry (1996)	Outside Looking In: The Best of the Gin Blossoms (1999)	The Millennium Collection: The Best of Gin Blossoms (2003)

Professional ratings
Review scores
Source	Rating
AllMusic	4/5 stars

Outside Looking In: The Best of the Gin Blossoms is a greatest hits album by American alternative rock band Gin Blossoms. It was released in 1999 on A&M Records. It includes eleven songs from their previous two A&M studio albums, New Miserable Experience and Congratulations… I'm Sorry. The remaining three songs are from different sources. "Just South of Nowhere" was originally included on the 1991 EP Up and Crumbling. The hit single "Til I Hear It from You" was originally found on the soundtrack of the 1995 movie Empire Records. "Whitewash" is a previously unreleased 1996 live recording of the song originally included on Congratulations… I'm Sorry.

== Track listing ==
1. "Follow You Down" (Scott Johnson, Bill Leen, Phillip Rhodes, Jesse Valenzuela, Robin Wilson) – 4:29
2. "Hey Jealousy" (Doug Hopkins) – 3:56
3. "Until I Fall Away" (Valenzuela, Wilson) – 3:51
4. "Allison Road" (Wilson) – 3:19
5. "Mrs. Rita" (Jim Swafford, Valenzuela) – 4:26
6. "Found Out About You" (Hopkins) – 3:54
7. "Not Only Numb" (Rhodes, Wilson) – 3:08
8. "Whitewash" (live) (Leen, Wilson) – 3:19
9. "Cajun Song" (Valenzuela) – 2:57
10. "Just South of Nowhere" (Valenzuela) – 3:27
11. "Pieces of the Night" (Hopkins) – 4:33
12. "As Long as It Matters" (Rhodes, Valenzuela, Wilson) – 4:30
13. "Day Job" (Johnson, Leen, Rhodes, Valenzuela, Wilson) – 3:51
14. "Til I Hear It from You" (Valenzuela, Wilson, Marshall Crenshaw) – 3:52
