= Rarities (Gin Blossoms album) =

Compilation album by Gin Blossoms
- Released: January 5, 2010
- Recorded: 1991–1994
- Genre: Power pop, jangle pop, alternative rock, pop rock
- Length: 62:28
- Label: A&M
- Producer: Gin Blossoms, John Hampton

Gin Blossoms chronology
Live in Concert (2009)	Rarities (2010)	No Chocolate Cake (2010)

Professional ratings
Review scores
Source	Rating
AllMusic	3/5 stars

Rarities is a compilation album by pop rock band Gin Blossoms. It was released in 2010 on A&M Records. It is most of the bonus disc from the New Miserable Experience Deluxe Edition, 2-disc set released in 2002, which had three extra cuts from the Dusted album. The separate release here includes nineteen tracks not found on prior albums. These encompass seven tracks from two EPs, Up and Crumbling and Shut Up and Smoke, six tracks from a 1993 live performance, two studio outtakes, two alternate versions of previously released songs, a soundtrack contribution and Big Star cover.

== Track listing ==
1. "Keli Richards" (Doug Hopkins, Bill Leen) (from the Up and Crumbling EP, 1991) – 3:04
2. "Just South of Nowhere" (Jesse Valenzuela) (from the Up and Crumbling EP, 1991) – 3:26
3. "Angels Tonight" (Hopkins) (from the Up and Crumbling EP, 1991) – 3:33
4. "Blue Eyes Bleeding" (Hopkins) (outtake from New Miserable Experience sessions, 1992) – 2:30
5. "Soul Deep" (Wayne Carson) (from the Shut Up and Smoke EP, 1993) – 3:04
6. "Heart Away" (Robin Wilson) (from the Shut Up and Smoke EP, 1993) – 2:21
7. "Cold River Dick" (Scott Johnson, Leen, Phillip Rhodes, Valenzuela, Wilson) (from the Shut Up and Smoke EP, 1993) – 1:15
8. "Christine Irene" (Wilson, Valenzuela) (from the Shut Up and Smoke EP, 1993) – 2:42
9. "Number One" (John Lennon, Paul McCartney, Neil Innes) (outtake from the Shut Up and Smoke sessions, 1993) – 2:35
10. "Idiot Summer" (Johnson, Leen, Rhodes, Valenzuela, Wilson) (from the Wayne's World 2 soundtrack, 1993) – 4:12
11. "Back of a Car" (Alex Chilton, Andy Hummel) (from the Big Star tribute album Big Star, Small World, 1993) – 2:43
12. "Allison Road" (Wilson) (remix, 1994) – 3:21
13. "Hold Me Down" (Hopkins, Wilson) (recorded live at The Belly Up Tavern, Solana Beach, CA, May 13, 1993) – 4:55
14. "Hey Jealousy" (Hopkins) (recorded live at The Belly Up Tavern, Solana Beach, CA, May 13, 1993) – 3:57
15. "Mrs. Rita" (Valenzuela, Jim Swafford) (recorded live at The Belly Up Tavern, Solana Beach, CA, May 13, 1993) – 4:20
16. "29" (Valenzuela) (recorded live at The Belly Up Tavern, Solana Beach, CA, May 13, 1993) – 4:06
17. "Movin' On Up" (Jeff Barry, Ja'net Dubois) (recorded live at The Belly Up Tavern, Solana Beach, CA, May 13, 1993) – 2:56
18. "Folsom Prison Blues" (Johnny Cash) (recorded live at The Belly Up Tavern, Solana Beach, CA, May 13, 1993) – 3:08
19. "Pieces of the Night" (Hopkins) (alternate version from New Miserable Experience sessions, with piano ending, 1992) – 4:20
