= Disarray =

Disarray may refer to:

- Disarray, an EP by Pound
- "Disarray", a song by Red Flag from The Eagle and Child, 2000
- "Disarray", a song by Lifehouse from Who We Are, 2007
- "Disarray", a song by Erra from Neon, 2018
- "Disarray", a song by Tommy Keene
- "Miss Disarray", a single by Gin Blossoms from No Chocolate Cake, 2010
