= As Long as It Matters =

1996 single by Gin Blossoms

Single by Gin Blossoms

from the album Congratulations I'm Sorry
- Released: July 16, 1996
- Length: 4:31
- Label: A&M
- Songwriters: Phillip Rhodes; Jesse Valenzuela; Robin Wilson
- Producers: Gin Blossoms; John Hampton

Gin Blossoms singles chronology
"Day Job" (1996)	"As Long as It Matters" (1996)	"Not Only Numb" (1996)

Music video
- "As Long as It Matters" on YouTube

"As Long as It Matters" is a song by American power pop band Gin Blossoms. It was released in July 1996 via A&M Records as the third single from their third studio album, Congratulations I'm Sorry (1996). The song was written by Phillip Rhodes, Jesse Valenzuela, and Robin Wilson and produced by John Hampton and the band.

Commercially, "As Long as It Matters" became a moderate hit in the United States and Canada, reaching numbers 57 and 75 on the US Cash Box Top 100 and Billboard Hot 100 charts, and number 10 on the Canadian RPM 100 Hit Tracks chart. In 1997, the song was nominated for a Grammy Award for Best Pop Performance by a Duo or Group with Vocals in 1997.

== Track listings ==
US CD, 7-inch, and cassette single
No.	Title	Length
1.	"As Long as It Matters" (fade)	4:15
2.	"Allison Road" (live)	3:26

US maxi-CD single
No.	Title	Length
1.	"As Long as It Matters" (LP version)	4:31
2.	"Allison Road" (live)	3:26
3.	"Whitewash" (live)	3:18
4.	"Until I Fall Away '94"	3:50

European CD single
No.	Title	Length
1.	"As Long as It Matters" (fade)	4:15
2.	"Memphis Time" (live)	3:16

Australian CD single
No.	Title	Length
1.	"As Long as It Matters" (fade)	4:15
2.	"Memphis Time" (live)	3:16
3.	"Mrs. Rita" (live)	4:10
4.	"Hands Are Ties" (live)	3:04

Japanese EP
No.	Title	Length
1.	"As Long as It Matters"
2.	"Allison Road" (live)
3.	"Til I Hear It from You" (live)
4.	"Found Out About You" (live)
5.	"Day Job" (live)
6.	"Follow You Down" (live)
7.	"As Long as It Matters" (live)
8.	"Hey Jealousy" (live)

== Charts ==
Chart (1996)	Peak position
Australia (ARIA)	142
Canada Top Singles (RPM)	10
Canada Adult Contemporary (RPM)	19
US Billboard Hot 100	75
US Adult Pop Airplay (Billboard)	30
US Pop Airplay (Billboard)	40
US Cash Box Top 100	57

== Release history ==
Region	Date	Format(s)	Label(s)	Ref.
United States	July 16, 1996	Contemporary hit radio	A&M	
Japan	November 25, 1996	CD EP	A&M	
