= Major Lodge Victory =

Studio album by Gin Blossoms
- Released: August 8, 2006
- Recorded: Ardent Studios, Memphis, Tennessee
- Genres: Alternative rock, power pop
- Length: 48:59
- Label: Hybrid
- Producers: John Hampton, Jesse Valenzuela, Danny Wilde

Gin Blossoms chronology
The Millennium Collection: The Best of Gin Blossoms (2003)	Major Lodge Victory (2006)	Live in Concert (2009)

Professional ratings
Review scores
Source	Rating
AllMusic	3/5 stars
The Daily Vault	B+
Entertainment Weekly	B
Melodic	4/5 stars
The Music Box	3.5/5 stars
Paste	(average)
Rolling Stone	2.5/5 stars
USA Today	3/4 stars

Major Lodge Victory is the fourth studio album by the power pop band Gin Blossoms. It was the first album released by the band since their 1997–2002 breakup. It was released on August 8, 2006, on Hybrid Recordings, making it the Gin Blossoms' first new album in over 10 years.

Hybrid promoted the album's first single, "Learning the Hard Way", for months prior to the album's release. The song received heavy AAA airplay and peaked at 8 on the FMQB AAA Chart. The second single, "Long Time Gone", was also released to radio later that year.

Major Lodge Victory entered the Billboard 200 album chart at number 159 after selling 5,000 copies in just one week. According to a Reuters news article this was the first time that the Gin Blossoms had appeared on the Billboard 200 chart in 10 years, one month and two weeks. The Gin Blossoms had last appeared on the chart during the week of July 13, 1996, with their previous album, Congratulations… I'm Sorry.

The album's title, according to the lead singer Robin Wilson, refers to an in–band joke by a former band member, Doug Hopkins. While touring by van in the early 1990s, the band was discussing whether to continue driving, or to stop at a hotel. Hopkins wanted to stop and rest. After this discussion, the band's van lost control and spun wildly. "Major," Hopkins said, referring to the near accident after the vehicle came to rest. A large hotel sign was visible nearby. "Lodge," he then stated, referring to the hotel. "Victory," he then stated, as the band then decided the near accident was a sign to stop driving for the night.

Major Lodge Victory has sold over 35,000 copies to date according to Nielsen Soundscan.

== Track listing ==
1. "Learning the Hard Way" (Jesse Valenzuela) – 4:09
2. "Come On Hard" (Robin Wilson) – 4:10
3. "Someday Soon" (Valenzuela) – 4:41
4. "Heart Shaped Locket" (Valenzuela, Danny Wilde, Sue Sandberg) – 3:49
5. "The End Of The World" (Wilson, Valenzuela) – 4:05
6. "Long Time Gone" (Valenzuela, Wilson, Wilde, Sandberg) – 3:49
7. "Super Girl" (Valenzuela) – 4:57
8. "Let's Play Two" (Valenzuela, Sandberg) – 3:03
9. "Curious Thing" (Valenzuela, Oliver Jones) – 4:12
10. "Jet Black Sunrise" (Bill Leen) – 4:13
11. "Fool For The Taking" (Valenzuela, Wilde, Sandberg) – 3:46
12. "California Sun" (Valenzuela, Wilde, Sandberg) – 4:05

== Personnel ==
Gin Blossoms

- Robin Wilson – vocals, guitar, percussion
- Jesse Valenzuela – electric and acoustic guitar, keyboards, vocals
- Scott Johnson – electric and acoustic guitar, vocals
- Bill Leen – bass, guitar, vocals
- Scott Kusmirek – drums

Additional musicians

- Dorian Crozier – drums (12)
- Sue Sandberg – backing vocals
- Rick Steff – organ, piano
- Danny Wilde – backing vocals
- David Zeman – keyboards

Technical personnel

- John Hampton – engineer
- Danny Wilde – mixing
- Jesse Valenzuela – mixing
- Vic Anesini – mastering

== Charts ==
Album - Billboard (North America)

Year	Chart	Position
2006	The Billboard 200	159
2006	Top Independent Albums	10
