= From Beyond the Back Burner =

Studio album by Gas Giants
- Released: October 19, 1999
- Studio: Mayberry Studios, Tempe, Arizona, US
- Genre: Alternative rock; pop rock
- Length: 48:14
- Label: Atomic Pop
- Producer: John Hampton

From Beyond the Back Burner is the debut album by Arizona-based pop rock band Gas Giants, released on Atomic Pop Records on October 19, 1999.

== Reception ==
AllMusic gave the recording three out of five stars and in its review by Stephen Thomas Erlewine praises the band for feeling like it is having fun and including humor in the lyrics. He writes that the album is "unassuming, good-natured, and melodic hard-pop". In CMJ New Music Monthly, Meredith Ochs gave the album a mixed review, saying that it followed from Gin Blossoms' work and expanded it by adding stadium rock guitar but "although Wilson's melodies pull the songs together, the hooks don't really stick without great lyrics to hang on".

== Track listing ==
All songs written by Gas Giants

1. "Now the Change" – 4:48
2. "I Hope My Kids Like Marilyn Manson" – 2:25
3. "In Between Two Worlds" – 3:35
4. "Stinking Up the Charts" – 3:17
5. "Whose Side Are You On" – 4:40
6. "Circus of Stars" – 3:32
7. "Quitter" – 3:52
8. "Useless" – 3:14
9. "Letter" – 3:19
10. "Going Down" – 3:16
11. "Like It or Not" – 3:08
12. "Tonight Won't Let Me Wonder" – 4:22
13. "You're Absolutely" – 4:22

== Personnel ==
Gas Giants

- Mickey Ferrell – bass guitar
- Daniel Henzerling – lead guitar, vocals
- Phillip Rhodes – drums, vocals
- Robin Wilson – lead vocals, guitar

Additional personnel

- Geof Darrow – artwork
- John Hampton – production
- George Marino – audio mastering at Sterling Sound, Edgewater, New Jersey, United States
- Chris Widmer – recording
