= Mixed Reality (album) =

Studio album by Gin Blossoms
- Released: June 15, 2018
- Recorded: January 2017–2018
- Studios: Drive-In Studios, Winston-Salem, North Carolina, United States
- Genre: Alternative rock
- Length: 53:34
- Label: Cleopatra
- Producer: Don Dixon

Gin Blossoms chronology
Icon (2011)	Mixed Reality (2018)

Mixed Reality is the sixth studio album by American alternative rock band Gin Blossoms. It was released on June 15, 2018, on Cleopatra Records.

== Recording and release ==
The band's longtime producer John Hampton died in 2014 and while they toured to promote the 25th anniversary of their most successful album, New Miserable Experience, the band members met Don Dixon at a show in Ohio. They discussed recording together and entered Dixon's recording partner Mitch Easter's studio in October 2016. Vocalist Robin Wilson says that the sessions for the album were "really inspired." The band spent about a year writing songs and doing demos before recording the album. Wilson calls Mixed Reality "sort of a companion" to New Miserable Experience and says, "It feels to me like a record we would have all wanted to make when we were 25."

The band released "Break" as a lead single and followed the release with a tour that was documented on their Chicago date, where they played this album and New Miserable Experience in their entirety.

== Track listing ==
1. "Break" (Robin Wilson) – 4:00
2. "Face the Dark" (Wilson) – 4:09
3. "New Mexico Trouble" (Bill Leen, Scott Johnson) – 4:23
4. "Angels Fly" (Jesse Valenzuela, Danny Wilde) – 3:51
5. "Here Again" (Valenzuela, Wilde) – 4:01
6. "Still Some Room in Heaven" (Johnson, Leen) – 2:58
7. "Miranda Chicago" (Leen) – 3:52
8. "Girl on the Side" (Johnson, Kira Brown) – 4:02
9. "Fortunate Street" (Valenzuela, Wilde) – 3:46
10. "Wonder" (Valenzuela, Wilde) – 3:56
11. "Shadow" (Johnson, Wilson) – 3:41
12. "Forever Is This Night" (Wilson) – 3:13
13. "The JFK Shit Show" (Wilson, Johnson) – 0:30
14. "The Devil's Daughter" (Wilson) – 2:23
15. "Mega Pawn King" (Leen) – 4:49

== Personnel ==
Gin Blossoms

- Robin Wilson – vocals, guitar, percussion
- Jesse Valenzuela – guitars, vocals
- Bill Leen – bass guitar
- Scotty Johnson – guitar
- Scott Hessel – drums

Additional musicians

- Peter Holsapple – keyboards
- Grey Wilson – percussion

Technical personnel

- Don Dixon – production, mixing (1–3, 6–8, 11–15)
- Mitch Easter – engineering
- Danny Wilde – mixing (4, 5, 9, 10)
- Greg Calbi – mastering

== Chart performance ==
Chart (2018)	Peak position
US Independent Albums (Billboard)	36
