= Congratulations I'm Sorry =

Studio album by Gin Blossoms
- Released: February 13, 1996
- Recorded: 1995
- Studio: Ardent Studios, Memphis, Tennessee; Vintage Recorders, Phoenix, Arizona
- Genre: Alternative pop
- Length: 44:29
- Label: A&M
- Producer: Gin Blossoms, John Hampton

Gin Blossoms chronology
New Miserable Experience (1992)	Congratulations I'm Sorry (1996)	Outside Looking In: The Best of the Gin Blossoms (1999)

Singles from Congratulations I'm Sorry
- 1. "Follow You Down" Released: January 30, 1996; 2. "Day Job" Released: 1996; 3. "As Long as It Matters" Released: July 16, 1996; 4. "Not Only Numb" Released: 1996

Congratulations I'm Sorry (typeset as Congratulations...I'm Sorry) is the third studio album by the American alternative rock band Gin Blossoms, and the follow-up album to the successful 1992 release New Miserable Experience, released in 1996 by A&M Records. The album was named in reference to the success of 1992's New Miserable Experience, followed closely by the suicide of the former band member Doug Hopkins in 1993.

Reaction to Congratulations I'm Sorry was mixed, with some critics feeling that the music lay too close to the sound of the previous album. One common complaint was that most versions of the album lacked the successful 1995 single "Til I Hear It from You", from the Empire Records soundtrack; however, some editions of the album did contain the track as its final.

The album's title, according to the lead singer Robin Wilson, came from the response band members usually received from people who both wanted to congratulate the band for the success of New Miserable Experience, while then offering apologies for their friend and former band member Doug Hopkins. The album eventually reached platinum status.

== Reception ==
Professional ratings
Review scores
Source	Rating
AllMusic	3/5 stars
Entertainment Weekly	B
The Music Box	3/5 stars
Rolling Stone	2/5 stars

Reception to the album was mixed. AllMusic reviewer Stephen Thomas Erlewine explained that "the only fault of Congratulations...I'm Sorry is that it sounds a bit too close to the debut—there's virtually no difference in terms of style and production." Entertainment Weekly critic David Browne said that "there’s something too generic about the Gin Blossoms."

People called the album "a quick fix for any dark mood", continuing, "the songs are so upbeat they almost conjure sunny summer afternoons."

== Track listing ==
No.	Title	Writer(s)	Length
1.	"Day Job"	Robin Wilson, Scott Johnson, Jesse Valenzuela, Bill Leen, Phillip Rhodes	3:51
2.	"Highwire"	Wilson	2:24
3.	"Follow You Down"	Wilson, Johnson, Valenzuela, Leen, Rhodes	4:30
4.	"Not Only Numb"	Wilson, Rhodes	3:06
5.	"As Long as It Matters"	Wilson, Valenzuela, Rhodes	4:31
6.	"Perfectly Still"	Johnson, Leen	4:05
7.	"7th Inning Stretch"		0:14
8.	"My Car"	Valenzuela	4:17
9.	"Virginia"	Valenzuela	4:02
10.	"Whitewash"	Wilson, Leen	3:19
11.	"I Can't Figure You Out"	Valenzuela	3:18
12.	"Memphis Time"	Johnson, Valenzuela	3:14
13.	"Competition Smile"	Wilson, Rhodes	4:48
Total length:			44:30

- "Competition Smile" ends at 3:38. Following 30 seconds of silence, an untitled hidden track begins.

International edition bonus track
No.	Title	Writer(s)	Length
13.	"Til I Hear It from You"	Wilson, Valenzuela, Marshall Crenshaw	3:47

- The track "7th Inning Stretch" is omitted from international releases of the album. This version of the album has 13 tracks, with "Til I Hear It from You" as track 13.

== Excluded songs ==
Among tracks excluded from the album are "Seeing Stars", a song written by the lead singer Robin Wilson about the band's ex-lead guitarist Doug Hopkins, and the 1995 hit "Til I Hear It from You". The latter was released as a single (although it is included on the international edition of the album) and can be found on the soundtrack of the movie Empire Records, while the former was included as a B-side on the "Follow You Down" single, along with Wilson's "Idiot Summer" from the soundtrack of Wayne's World 2.

== Personnel ==
Gin Blossoms

- Robin Wilson – lead vocals, acoustic guitar, harmonica
- Scott Johnson – guitar, background vocals
- Jesse Valenzuela – guitar, vocals
- Bill Leen – bass guitar, background vocals
- Phillip Rhodes – percussion, drums, background vocals

Additional personnel

- Art Neville – Hammond organ
- Rick Steff – accordion
- Robbie Turner – pedal steel guitar
- James SK Wān – bamboo flute

== Production ==
- Producers: Gin Blossoms, John Hampton
- Engineers: Erik Flettrich, John Hampton, Billy Siegle
- Assistant engineer: Billy Moss
- Mixing: John Hampton
- Dave Collins - mastering
- Pre-production: Billy Siegle
- Direction: Bill Graham
- Art direction: Robin Wilson
- Design: Karen Walker, Robin Wilson
- Photography: Danny Clinch, Robin Wilson
- Cover photo: Robin Wilson

== Charts ==
=== Weekly charts ===
Chart (1996)	Peak position
Australian Albums (ARIA)	41
New Zealand Albums (RMNZ)	41
Scottish Albums (OCC)	34
UK Albums (OCC)	42
US Billboard 200	10

=== Year-end charts ===
Chart (1996)	Position
US Billboard 200	138

== Certifications ==
Region	Certification	Certified units/sales
United States (RIAA)	Platinum	1,000,000^{^}
^{^} Shipments figures based on certification alone.
