= Til I Hear It from You =

1995 single by Gin Blossoms

Single by Gin Blossoms

from the album Empire Records: The Soundtrack and some versions of Congratulations I'm Sorry
- Released: July 24, 1995
- Studio: Ardent (Memphis, Tennessee)
- Genre: Alternative rock; power pop
- Length: 3:47
- Label: A&M
- Songwriters: Jesse Valenzuela; Robin Wilson; Marshall Crenshaw
- Producer: John Hampton

Gin Blossoms singles chronology
"Allison Road" (1994)	"Til I Hear It from You" (1995)	"Follow You Down" (1996)

"Til I Hear It from You" is a song by American rock band Gin Blossoms, released as the lead single from the soundtrack to the film Empire Records in July 1995. It topped the Canadian RPM 100 Hit Tracks chart for six weeks, rose to number eight in Iceland, and reached number 39 in the United Kingdom. In January 1996, it was released as a double-A side with "Follow You Down" in the United States, peaking at number nine on the Billboard Hot 100. Billboard described "Til I Hear It from You" as "the closest thing to a perfect pop song to hit radio in recent memory" lauding its "breezy and wonderfully infectious melody, the boy-needs-girl lyrics, and the earnest execution."

== Writing and Empire Records soundtrack ==
Gin Blossoms' guitarist Jesse Valenzuela would write an embryonic version of the song with Marshall Crenshaw in a hotel in Austin, Texas where the Gin Blossoms and Crenshaw were both participating in South by Southwest 1995. Crenshaw said: "Jesse Valenzuela had started the music and asked me to help him finish it. We didn't know each other but he sought me out...The verse melody is from me - I helped him figure out how to do the ending, the fade." After two hours Valenzuela and Crenshaw had committed a rough version of the tune to tape, and about two weeks later Crenshaw received a copy of the completed track from the band, lyrics having been written by the group's frontman Robin Wilson. Crenshaw remembered: "I didn't even meet him until after I'd already heard the record on the radio." He further said: "When they first finished it and sent it to me, I just sat and nitpicked it to death. I was thinking of all the things wrong that went wrong with it. Once I started hearing it on the radio every twenty minutes I realized that to get that fussy and that anal-retentive is a mistake. That kind of caused me to ease up on myself. It was a real instructional experience."

Mitchell Leib, co-executive producer of the Empire Records soundtrack, would recall: "[With] so many other alternative [music] soundtracks out there, we had a tough time finding [a strong lead] single. I was chasing the Gin Blossoms for a while: [the group's label] A&M was interested, but they didn't want to lend them to us." Regency Enterprises, producers of the Empire Records film, had a distribution pact with Warner Bros and the film's soundtrack was originally attached to the Warner Bros affiliate Atlantic Records. "The only way to get [the Gin Blossoms] was to move [the soundtrack] to A&M."

Gin Blossoms lead vocalist Robin Wilson would recall: "Empire Records [is] a classic film that only a handful of people really saw, but it definitely made an impact on that generation. It was really cool to have been a part of that and to have co-written a song with Marshall Crenshaw that went to the top of the charts. It was the peak of our career, and it was at the peak of the machinery that was operating. A&M was so in tune, and so good at what they were doing that we recorded the song, made a video, and it was on the radio in like four months. It was an amazing experience putting that song together on so many levels. It was rewarding to co-write a song with one of my heroes and for it to succeed on that level and be part of a system that worked so well. It was a once in a lifetime experience, really."

"Til I Hear It from You" is set in the key of A major with a tempo of 124 beats per minute in common time.

== Release ==
The original US single release "Til I Hear It from You" was as the headline track on a four track CD maxi single formatted as below: "Til I Hear It from You" was identified as "the LP Version" and "taken from the forthcoming A&M CD Congratulations I'm Sorry". However, when the album Congratulations I'm Sorry had its US release February 13, 1996, "Til I Hear It from You" did not appear on the album.

No.	Title	Length
1.	"Til I Hear It from You"	3:52
2.	"Seeing Stars"	3:53
3.	"Idiot Summer"	4:09
4.	"Hands Are Tied"	3:16

John Hampton, the Ardent Studios in-house producer who co-produced the Gin Blossoms recordings, would recall: "'Til I Hear It from You' not only sold the Empire [Records] soundtrack record, but it reinvigorated sales of [Gin Blossoms' debut album] New Miserable Experience...There was money EVERYWHERE!! And we were so fired up about the [follow-up album's prospective] sales with the inclusion of 'Til I Hear It From You', we thought [that album] was going to be huge. But...we could not have 'Til I Hear It from You' for [the second Gin Blossoms album] because the label that released the Empire Records soundtrack was justifiably concerned that the A&M sales might dwarf their soundtrack record sales." As the Empire Records soundtrack album was in fact also issued on A&M, any conflict of interest concern which prevented inclusion of the track "Til I Hear It from You" on the second Gin Blossoms' album Congratulations I'm Sorry would not have been a record label issue.

In a 2016 interview in which he said "It was kind of a silly decision" to leave "Til I Hear It from You" off Congratulations I’m Sorry, Jesse Valenzuela attributed the decision to an insistence on inclusion only of material written wholly by group members: "I remember being of [two] minds: [that] maybe it [should or] shouldn’t be on the [group's own album]...I don't think that the label was standing in the way of it...It was more [the band's] management than anything. We had pretty rough management at the time."

"Til I Hear It from You" was a featured track on all evident editions of the Congratulations I'm Sorry album released in territories other than the US, these editions - including those released in Australia, Canada, Europe, Japan, and the UK - omit the track "7th Inning Stretch" which was featured on the album's original US edition.

"Til I Hear It from You" began receiving radio airplay in August 1995, appearing that year on the Adult Contemporary chart in Billboard magazine - with a December peak of number five - and also appearing on both the magazine's Album Rock Tracks and Modern Rock Tracks with respective chart peaks of number four and number five in September. The track did not appear on the Billboard Hot 100 in 1995 or early 1996 due to the track not originally being available in a format then eligible for Hot 100 ranking. In Canada, "Til I Hear It from You" reached number one on the singles chart dated September 25, 1995, based on airplay: the track became Canada's longest-running number hit of 1995, its number-one tenure being six weeks.

When the advance single from Congratulations I'm Sorry, "Follow You Down", was issued as a single in January 1996, "Til I Hear It from You" served as B-side. Both featured sides debuted as a double A-side hit, identified as "Til I Hear It from You"/ "Follow You Down", on the Hot 100 dated February 10, 1996, with the single becoming the Gin Blossoms' first Top 20 single with its number 12 debut. The positioning of the titles of the single's two sides in its debut Hot 100 ranking (with "Til I Hear It from You" appearing first) was due to the current airplay for "Til I Hear It from You" being heavier. On the subsequent two weeks' Hot 100 charts, the single, ranked both weeks at number 11, again appeared as "Til I Hear It from You"/ "Follow You Down". As of the Hot 100 chart dated March 6, 1996, the single's ranking appeared as "Follow You Down"/ "Til I Hear It from You", "Follow You Down" now being the favored airplay side. As the single's highest Hot 100 position with "Til I Hear It from You" acknowledged first was number 11, that peak position is generally cited as the Hot 100 peak for "Til I Hear It from You"; however, the Hot 100 continued to rank both "Follow You Down" and "Til I Hear It from You" as a double A-side hit throughout the single's 46-week chart tenure, and the highest Hot 100 position attained by "Follow You Down"/ "Til I Hear It from You" was number nine where it held for four weeks in March 1996.

"Follow You Down" was also issued January 23, 1996, as the headline track on a four-track CD maxi single which featured "Til I Hear It from You" plus two tracks from the "Til I Hear It from You" CD maxi single release of September 1995: "Seeing Stars" and "Idiot Summer". ("Idiot Summer" was also included on the soundtrack to Wayne's World 2.)

== Charts ==
=== Weekly charts ===
Weekly chart performance for "Til I Hear It from You"
Chart (1995–1996)	Peak position
Australia (ARIA)	137
Canada Top Singles (RPM)	1
Canada Adult Contemporary (RPM)	27
Canada Rock/Alternative (RPM)	2
Iceland (Íslenski Listinn Topp 40)	8
Scottish Singles Sales (Official Charts)	29
UK Singles (Official Charts)	39
US Billboard Hot 100 with "Follow You Down"	9
US Adult Contemporary (Billboard)	5
US Adult Pop Airplay (Billboard)	3
US Alternative Airplay (Billboard)	5
US Mainstream Rock (Billboard)	4
US Pop Airplay (Billboard)	5
US Cash Box Top 100	7
US Adult Alternative Top 30 Tracks (Radio & Records)	1

=== Year-end charts ===
1995 year-end chart performance for "Til I Hear It from You"
Chart (1995)	Position
Canada Top Singles (RPM)	6
Iceland (Íslenski Listinn Topp 40)	95
US Album Rock Tracks (Billboard)	37
US Modern Rock Tracks (Billboard)	31
US Top 40/Mainstream (Billboard)	35

1996 year-end chart performance for "Til I Hear It from You"
Chart (1996)	Position
US Billboard Hot 100	15
US Adult Contemporary (Billboard)	19
US Adult Top 40 (Billboard)	20
US Top 40/Mainstream (Billboard)	64

== Release history ==
Release history and formats for "Til I Hear It from You"
Region	Date	Format(s)	Label(s)	Ref.
United States	July 24, 1995	Rock; alternative radio	A&M	
United States	July 25, 1995	Contemporary hit radio	A&M	
Australia	September 25, 1995	CD; cassette	A&M; Polydor	
United Kingdom	January 29, 1996	CD; cassette	A&M	

== Other versions ==
America remade "Til I Hear It from You" for their 2012 release, Back Pages, a cover album that according to group member Gerry Beckley comprises "killer songs that are great examples that come from our best songwriters. In the case of the Gin Blossoms [cover], it just so happens that Marshall [Crenshaw] co-wrote the song. I think the song stands on its own, and I love their version of it." It was Gerry Beckley who suggested "Til I Hear It from You" for the Back Pages project to his group co-member Dewey Bunnell, who had been unfamiliar with the song. "Til I Hear It from You" is one of three songs from Back Pages which America has added to its regular live set list - the others being "Time of the Season" and "Woodstock".

Dale Ann Bradley remade "Til I Hear It from You" for her 2015 album Pocket Full of Keys. Personnel on the track include Michael Cleveland on fiddle, Phil Leadbetter on resonator guitar, and Steve Thomas on guitar and mandolin.
