= Lustre (band) =

American power pop band active in the 1990s

- Origin: Zebulon, North Carolina
- Genre: Power pop
- Years active: 1990s
- Label: A&M
- Past members: Will Marley, John Ray, Greg Clayton

Lustre (originally founded as Shiner) was an Zebulon, North Carolina–based power pop band active in the 1990s. Their members were Will Marley (vocals and guitar), John Ray (bass), and Antiseen's Greg Clayton (drums). They released a single, self-titled album and opened for such bands as the Cure and Oasis.

== History ==
Lustre signed to A&M Records in 1995, and released one self-titled album on the label on March 5, 1996. The album was produced by Lou Giordano. They also contributed two tracks to the soundtrack of Empire Records. They were dropped from A&M's roster soon afterwards, and in 1998, Marley started another band, known as the Nickel Slots.

Marley and Clayton later formed a new band called The Feeds, who released their debut album in 2020 and gained some recognition in 2022 after Dan Avidan of Game Grumps mentioned he was a fan, describing them as "good, solid American rock".

== Reviews ==
Robert Christgau gave Lustre's 1996 self-titled album a C− grade, describing the band as "...roadies from Collective Soul and Better Than Ezra getting greedy." Tucson Weekly's Fred Mills gave the album 3 stars out of 4, writing that "For a young band's debut, this is a remarkably mature effort—one that predicts a great future to boot." A more mixed review of the album appeared in the Washington Post, where Mark Jenkins wrote,

In purely formal terms, the spiraling guitar and vocal lines of songs like "Sheer" and "Still Seems There" are effective, even exhilarating. But this trio doesn't quite transform its derivative sound with the immediacy of something never heard before.

== Discography ==
- Lustre (A&M, 1996)
