= The Martinis =

American alternative rock band

- Origin: Los Angeles, California, U.S.
- Genre: Alternative rock
- Years active: 1993–present
- Labels: Cooking Vinyl, Distracted Records
- Members: Joey Santiago; Linda Mallari
- Past members: Rachel Haden; Dave Lovering; Dawn Richardson; Adam Topol; Tad Wadhams

The Martinis are a rock band formed in Los Angeles, California in 1993. The band consisted of Pixies guitarist Joey Santiago and his then-wife Linda Mallari. They released albums on the Cooking Vinyl, Artist Direct, and Distracted/BMG labels. Their song "Free" was featured in the movie Empire Records and was on the movie's soundtrack album.

== Discography ==
- The Martinis (1998)
- Fast Forward... (1999)
- The Smitten Sessions E.P. (April 6, 2004) - released by Distracted Records, and featuring Pixies drummer Dave Lovering on the fifth track.
- Smitten (May 4, 2004) - Released by Cooking Vinyl
