= Gas Giants (band) =

American pop rock group (1997–2001)

- Origin: Tempe, Arizona, U.S.
- Years active: 1997–2001
- Label: Atomic Pop
- Spinoff of: Gin Blossoms
- Members: Robin Wilson; Phillip Rhodes; Dan Henzerling; Mickey Ferrel

Gas Giants were a pop rock band from Tempe, Arizona, formed as a successor project to the Gin Blossoms. The group was known as The Pharaohs when they formed in 1997, but changed their name after their label, A&M Records, merged with Universal Records and the band changed hands, re-signing with Interscope Records. Eventually, the group released their album, From Beyond the Back Burner, in 1999 on indie Atomic Pop Records. Comic book artist Geof Darrow provided the artwork for the album. The band featured Gin Blossoms members Robin Wilson, Phillip Rhodes and Daniel Henzerling, as well as Mickey Ferrel, who was previously in the band Grievous Angels. Henzerling was the drummer for the Gin Blossoms before the current drummer, Phillip Rhodes. The band toured with Train in 2000 behind the band's only single, "Quitter".

Because the Gin Blossoms have reunited as of 2006, Gas Giants appear to be on indefinite hiatus.

== Personnel ==
- Robin Wilson – lead vocals, guitar
- Daniel Henzerling – lead guitar, vocals
- Phillip Rhodes – drums, vocals
- Mickey Ferrell – bass

== Discography ==
- From Beyond the Back Burner (1999, Atomic Pop Records)

Other appearance

- Live in the X Lounge III – "Quitter" (live, 2000)
- Boys and Girls (2000 film) soundtrack – "Quitter" (2000)
- Gas Giants members were also featured on The Poppin' Wheelies (2000, Uranus Laboratories Inc.). This was intended to be the soundtrack of an animated series (never produced) about a band in space.
