= Empire Records =

1995 film by Allan Moyle

- Theatrical release poster
- Directed by: Allan Moyle
- Written by: Carol Heikkinen
- Produced by: Arnon Milchan; Michael Nathanson; Alan Riche; Tony Ludwig
- Starring: Anthony LaPaglia; Maxwell Caulfield; Ethan Embry; Debi Mazar; Rory Cochrane; Johnny Whitworth; Robin Tunney; Renée Zellweger; Liv Tyler
- Cinematography: Walt Lloyd
- Edited by: Michael Chandler
- Production company: Regency Enterprises
- Distributed by: Warner Bros.
- Release date: September 22, 1995
- Running time: 90 minutes
- Country: United States
- Language: English
- Budget: $10 million
- Box office: $303,841 (United States)

Empire Records is a 1995 American coming-of-age comedy-drama film directed by Allan Moyle, written by Carol Heikkinen, and starring an ensemble cast including Anthony LaPaglia, Maxwell Caulfield, Ethan Embry, Debi Mazar, Rory Cochrane, Johnny Whitworth, Robin Tunney, Renée Zellweger, and Liv Tyler.

The plot follows a group of record store employees over the course of one exceptional day. The employees try to stop the store from being sold to a large chain, and learn about each other along the way.

Empire Records was theatrically released in the United States on September 22, 1995, by Warner Bros. to generally mixed reviews and major box office losses. Nonetheless, several of its stars managed to go on to enjoy successful careers. The film has since gone on to become a cult classic.

== Plot ==
At independent record store Empire Records in Delaware, employee Lucas has been tasked by store manager Joe with closing the store for the first time. While counting the day's receipts in Joe's office, he discovers the store is about to be sold and converted into a branch of Music Town, a large national chain.

Determined to keep the store independent, Lucas hatches a plan, taking the day's cash receipts of approximately $9,000 to a casino in Atlantic City to quadruple it playing craps. Though successfully doubling the money on his first roll, he loses everything on the second.

The following morning, fellow Empire employees A.J. and Mark find Lucas, who confides in them about the previous night's events, just before riding off on his motorcycle. Joe arrives and quickly receives frantic phone calls about the missing deposit from both the bank and the store's owner, Mitchell Beck.

Other employees arrive, including overachieving high school student Corey and her uninhibited best friend Gina. Hostile employee Deb, who has survived an apparent suicide attempt, also arrives. She then goes into the bathroom and shaves her head.

Upon Lucas' arrival, Joe confronts him about the missing deposit and Lucas confirms the money was lost. Joe explains his anti-Music Town plan to the employees – he had saved enough money to become part-owner of the store to save it, but will now be $9,000 short as he must cover the missing money with Mitchell.

Joe is distracted from the crisis due to a major store event: Rex Manning Day. Has-been 1980s pop idol Rex Manning is holding an autograph session at the store for fans of his latest album Back with More. Staff mock both Manning and the event, and ultimately many of the fans showing up to meet him are either older women or gay men.

Though detained by Joe in his office, Lucas nonetheless apprehends a belligerent young shoplifter who identifies himself only as "Warren Beatty". He is taken away by police but vows to return seeking revenge.

Encouraged by Gina, Corey indulges her schoolgirl crush on Manning by attempting to seduce him, but winds up humiliated and dejected; A.J. then chooses this inopportune time to confess his love to Corey, which she rejects. After Gina and Corey argue, Gina has sex with Manning. When the staff discover this, A.J. attacks Manning, Gina reveals Corey's addiction to amphetamines, Corey hysterically trashes the store, and Joe orders Manning to leave, which he immediately does after the staff insults his lack of talent.

Deb surprisingly attempts to cheer Corey up, and in return Corey holds a mock funeral for her with the whole staff, during which Deb reveals she nearly killed herself because she felt invisible. The shoplifter "Warren" returns with a gun (ultimately loaded with blanks), and Lucas defuses the situation by revealing that he himself was a troubled youth until he was taken in and saved by Joe. Joe in turn offers "Warren" a job at the store and Warren happily accepts.

After the police leave, Lucas admits defeat and suggests confessing the truth about the missing money to Mitchell. The staff try to replace it but can only pool together $3,000. Suddenly inspired, Mark runs in front of the news crew covering Warren's holdup, announcing on live TV a late-night benefit party at the store to "Save the Empire".

An impromptu concert on the roof by Gina and Berko, another employee, raises funds so Joe can hand the money raised to Mitchell for the lost amount. Mitchell then offers to sell the store "cheap" to Joe, no longer wanting to deal with Empire Records.

Corey finally finds A.J. on the roof fixing the Empire Records sign and confesses that she loves him, too. He decides to attend art school in Boston to be near her while she attends Harvard. They kiss, and the staff ends the long day with a dance party on the roof.

== Cast ==
- Anthony LaPaglia as Joseph "Joe" Reaves
- Maxwell Caulfield as Rex Manning
- Debi Mazar as Jane
- Rory Cochrane as Lucas
- Johnny Whitworth as A.J.
- Robin Tunney as Debra
- Renee Zellweger as Gina
- Ethan Randall as Mark
- Liv Tyler as Corey Mason
- Coyote Shivers as Berko
- Brendan Sexton as Warren
- James 'Kimo' Wills as Eddie
- Ben Bode as Mitchell Beck

== Production ==
Heikkinen based the film on her time working in retail stores in high school and college. She was partly inspired by the 1976 comedy Car Wash, which took place in a single day at a workplace.During high school she worked in the video department of Tower Records #166 in Christown Mall in Phoenix, Arizona. Later, she worked at a Tower Video on the Sunset Strip in West Hollywood, California.

Real-life incidents inspired scenes in the film, including a story Heikkinen heard about an employee who stole from the store but later returned. In the second draft, Heikkinen added a storyline of a corporate takeover threat. Additionally, Heikkinen wrote a draft where Corey wanted to meet Rex Manning, but someone else wrote a draft where Corey, a virgin who got accepted into Harvard, wanted to lose her virginity to Manning. She also borrowed the names of real-life people for characters in the film: Marc, Berko, and Corey.

Heikkinen's spec script was first given to Alan Riche's producing partner, Tony Ludwig, by William Morris agent Rob Carlson, telling Riche that Heikkinen had attended Riche's high school, in Phoenix. They brought the script to Michael Nathanson, president of Regency Pictures, and director Allan Moyle, known for Pump Up the Volume became attached.

New Regency got into a bidding war with Warner Bros. over the script. Carol Heikkinen was offered $325,000 up-front and $200,000 if the film was made. Heikkinen was also to receive 1% of any soundtrack royalties and 5% of merchandise sales.

Two days after Regency Enterprises executive Michael Nathanson gave approval to proceed with making Empire Records, he was approached with the script for Clueless. As he already had a movie aimed at teens with Empire Records, he turned down Clueless which went on to be a box office success while Empire Records was ultimately a box-office bomb.

Moyle spent a month on rehearsals, pilates, dinners, and time for the actors.

Tunney said she shaved her head for the film because Allan told her studio executives thought she was "too cute to be depressed", but cutting her hair was a precarious scene because she cut her real hair and could only do so once.

Exteriors for the record store facade were filmed at 15 South Front Street in Wilmington, North Carolina, in a nightclub, then known as The Palladium, that had a few feet of space converted into a replica of the store set which was located at Carolco (now Screen Gems) studios, and backed with a large picture of the rest of the store.

Exteriors in the Wilmington, North Carolina area also include Riverfront Park; Caffe Phoenix at 9 South Front Street; Cape Fear Memorial Bridge; Wrightsville Beach.

Interiors for the two-level record store were built in a warehouse, with views out windows constructed in forced perspective, not CGI. Allan Moyle's then-wife Dianna Miranda is Lilly, on rollerskates (scenes deleted).

Interiors for the Atlantic City casino were constructed out of the Coconut Grove room at the Ambassador Hotel on Wilshire Boulevard in Los Angeles (Regency President Michael Nathanson's then-girlfriend (Kimber Sissons, as Kimber Monroe) is the woman who tells Lucas, "You're sex").

Exteriors for Corey Mason's House were filmed at Forest Hills Drive.

The Rex Manning music video "Say No More, Mon Amour" was shot prior to principal photography, and was shot on Wrightsville Beach in North Carolina in one day. It was intended to be only a 17-second dance move piece for the main actors to make fun of in the film. Jordan Dawes, the director of the music video, shot for the entire day and gave the producers a complete music video that was almost five minutes in length.

Tobey Maguire asked director Allan Moyle to release him from the film, due to what media reports described as unspecified "emotional difficulties" Maguire faced during production. Moyle agreed, and all of Maguire's scenes were removed from the final film, and Maguire then sought help for a drinking problem.

== Release ==
The film was initially scheduled for a wide release after early positive responses from largely white test audiences. However, sharply negative reviews from heavily Hispanic audiences led to a change in strategy and thus Empire Records received a limited two-week run on very few screens, only 87 screens by one account, and with no substantial advertising.

== Reception ==
=== Box office ===
The film was a severe flop, making only $150,800 in its opening weekend, and by the end of its run in North America it earned a total of $303,841 against its $10 million budget.

=== Critical response ===
On Rotten Tomatoes the film has an approval rating of 35% based on reviews from 37 critics. The site's consensus is: "Despite a terrific soundtrack and a strong early performance from Renee Zellweger, Empire Records is mostly a silly and predictable teen dramedy." On Metacritic the film has a score of 47 out of 100 based on reviews from 7 critics, indicating "generally unfavorable" reviews.

Variety wrote "Nice look, great sound and indefinable youth luster will make Records play OK on vid, especially at parties where frenetic aimlessness is not a negative", calling Empire Records a "soundtrack in search of a movie", describing the film as "one teen-music effort that never finds a groove" before adding that "as far as chart action goes, it could use a bullet -- to put it out of its B.O. misery"

TV Guide gave the film 2 stars out of 5, calling it a "lame comedy" that appeared to be little more than "an elaborate excuse to package and peddle a soundtrack CD."

Roger Ebert gave the film a negative score of one and a half stars out of four, and referred to Empire Records as a "lost cause". However he noted Cochran and Tyler had "real screen presence" and wished they found better scripts in the future.

Caroline Westbrook of Empire magazine, gave it 3 out of 5, saying "For all its faults, the good-natured, quirky humour that this for the most part offers ultimately makes it very hard to dislike." Ty Burr of Entertainment Weekly called it "too blatant a throwback to crass '80s teen fodder to really work."

In 2020, The Guardian wrote: "what saves this film is its unselfconsciously optimistic, goofy, principled spirit. Empire Records was about seeing the silver lining even in the most terrible, scrape-the-bottom-of-the-barrel times, forming unlikely friendships and finding family at work, challenging the financial security and mediocrity of signing on the dotted line and "selling out", and riding out the highs and lows of an industry in its doom-and-gloom phase".

== Music ==
=== Background ===
The soundtrack album for Empire Records was curated by Mitchell Leib, a music supervisor for the film. The soundtrack was originally attached to Atlantic Records—an affiliate of Warner Bros. Pictures at the time—because Warner Bros. had a distribution pact with the film's producers, Regency Enterprises. However, the soundtrack album was given to A&M Records in order to obtain the participation of A&M artists the Gin Blossoms, whose track "Til I Hear It from You" was issued as the lead single. Besides the Gin Blossoms, four other A&M acts had new tracks released on the soundtrack album: Ape Hangers, Drill, Innocence Mission, and Lustre.

The album also introduced tracks by Better Than Ezra, Cracker, the Cranberries, Evan Dando (whose cover of Big Star's "The Ballad of El Goodo" featured Empire Records female lead Liv Tyler on background vocals), and Toad The Wet Sprocket, and by unsigned acts the Martinis, Please, and Coyote Shivers. The Martinis—featuring former Pixies members Joey Santiago and Dave Lovering—were recommended by Hits magazine president Karen Glauber who Leib brought in as a musical consultant for Empire Records, while the film's line music supervisor Bob Knickman discovered Please by searching the internet for unsigned talent suitable for the film's soundtrack. Coyote Shivers, who played aspiring-musician-turned-store-clerk Berko in the film, became involved in the project by virtue of being the stepfather of Liv Tyler (Shivers being married to Tyler's mother, Bebe Buell, at the time).

Two previously released tracks were also included on the original release of the Empire Records soundtrack album: "A Girl Like You" by Edwyn Collins and "Ready, Steady, Go" by the Meices (the latter's frontman Joe Reineke subsequently led Alien Crime Syndicate). "The Honeymoon Is Over" by the Cruel Sea, a track heard in the film but not featured on the US release of the soundtrack album, was included on the German and Australian releases.

The Gin Blossoms' "Til I Hear It From You" charted as high as #9, affording the band their first Top 20 hit. Two other tracks from the album had a single release: Edwyn Collins' "A Girl Like You", which charted at #32, "I Don't Want to Live Today" by the Ape Hangers.

The version of the song "Sugarhigh" that appears in the movie differs significantly from the one included on the soundtrack. The film version has additional lyrics and chorus vocals provided by Renée Zellweger. It was intended only as a rough mix for playback during filming but was included on the soundtrack album because a remastered version was not available. Francis "Coyote" Shivers, the artist who released the song, played the lead singer who performed the song on the rooftop of the store at the end of the movie.

The Empire Records soundtrack peaked at No. 63 on the Billboard 200 album chart.

"I think we did end up selling 2 million records, which is fucking unbelievable for a movie that did $147,000 at the box office" — Mitchell Leib, a music supervisor for the film

AllMusic.com rated the soundtrack 4 out of 5.

BuzzFeed.com described the soundtrack as "a collection of B-sides from prominent artists, covers, and new finds".

In 2010, Gin Blossoms frontman Robin Wilson said of Empire Records, "[It's] a classic film that only a handful of people really saw, but it definitely made an impact on that generation. It was really cool to have been a part of that".

=== Tracklist ===
Empire Records: The Soundtrack
No.	Title	Writer(s)	Producer(s)	Length
1.	"Til I Hear It from You" (Gin Blossoms)	Jesse Valenzuela; Robin Wilson; Marshall Crenshaw	John Hampton; Gin Blossoms	3:46
2.	"Liar" (The Cranberries)	Dolores O'Riordan^{[a]}^{[b]}; Noel Hogan^{[a]}	Stephen Street	2:21
3.	"A Girl Like You" (Edwyn Collins)	Edwyn Collins	Edwyn Collins	3:55
4.	"Free" (The Martinis)	Linda Mallari-Santiago; Joey Santiago	Matt Wallace	4:24
5.	"Crazy Life" (Toad the Wet Sprocket)	Todd Nichols^{[a]}; Toad^{[a]}; Glen Phillips^{[b]}	Gavin MacKillop	4:17
6.	"Bright as Yellow" (The Innocence Mission)	Karen Peris	Dennis Herring	3:32
7.	"Circle of Friends" (Better Than Ezra)	Kevin Griffin	Better Than Ezra	3:26
8.	"I Don't Want to Live Today" (Ape Hangers)	Ape Hangers	Michael W. Douglass; Alex Reed	3:14
9.	"Whole Lotta Trouble" (Cracker)	John Hickman; Chris LeRoy	Don Smith; Cracker	2:27
10.	"Ready, Steady, Go" (The Meices)	Billy Idol; Tony James	Gil Norton	3:05
11.	"What You Are" (Drill)	Lucia Cifarelli; Dan Harnett	Rick Kerr	4:25
12.	"Nice Overalls" (Lustre)	Greg Clayton; Will Marley; John Ray	Lou Giordano	5:18
13.	"Here It Comes Again" (Please)	Paul Casanova	Jerry Harrison	2:41
14.	"The Ballad of El Goodo" (Evan Dando)	Chris Bell; Alex Chilton	Bryce Goggin	3:41
15.	"Sugarhigh" (Coyote Shivers)	Coyote Shivers	Daniel Lanois; Coyote Shivers	2:37
16.	"The Honeymoon Is Over" (The Cruel Sea) (Australian and German edition)	Dan Rumour; Tex Perkins; James Cruickshank	Tony Cohen; The Cruel Sea; Mick Harvey^{[c]}	3:05

Notes

- ^{^[a]} signifies a music composer
- ^{^[b]} signifies a lyricist
- ^{^[c]} signifies an assistant producer

=== Songs in the film but not on the soundtrack album ===
- "Can't Stop Losing Myself" by Dirt Clods
- "Hey Joe" by Dirt Clods
- "Dark and Brooding" by Noah Stone
- "Thorn in My Side" by Quicksand
- "Little Bastard" by Ass Ponys (as Ass Ponies)
- "I Don't Know Why" by Sacrilicious
- "Real" by Anyone
- "If You Want Blood (You've Got It)" by AC/DC
- "Counting Blue Cars" by Dishwalla
- "Snakeface" by Throwing Muses
- "Candy" by Full Tilt Gonzo
- "How" by The Cranberries
- "Hardlight" by Pegboy
- "Chew Toy" by Fig Dish
- "Power Shack" by Fitz of Depression
- "Saddam a Go-Go" by Gwar
- "Back Down Blues" by Loose Diamonds
- "Tomorrow" by Mouth Music
- "Plowed" by Sponge
- "Surround You" by Billy White Trio
- "L.A. Girl" by Adolescents
- "Vinyl Advice" by Dead Hot Workshop
- "This Is the Day" by The The
- "Say No More (Mon Amour)" by Maxwell Caulfield as Rex Manning (written for the film)
- "She Walks" by Poster Children
- "Sorry" by Sybil Vane
- "Infinity" by Mouth Music
- "Money (That's What I Want)" by Flying Lizards
- "Sugar High (ft. Renee Zellweger)" by Coyote Shivers
- "Seems" by Queen Sarah Saturday
- "Romeo and Juliet" by Dire Straits
- "Video Killed the Radio Star" by The Buggles
- "I Shot the Devil" by Suicidal Tendencies
- "Smooth Up in Ya" by Bulletboys
- "Rock 'n' Roll/EGA" by Daniel Johnston

=== Charts ===
Chart (1995)	Peak position
Canada Top Albums/CDs (RPM)	20
US Billboard 200	63

== Home media ==
Empire Records was released on VHS on March 5, 1996, by Warner Home Video. On June 3, 2003, Warner Home Video released the Remix: Special Fan Edition DVD of Empire Records. The unrated version is 107 minutes long and includes four extra scenes and 17 minutes of additional footage.

For the 2015 Blu-ray release from the film's new owner 20th Century Fox, only the theatrical cut has been included, with the extras ported over from the 2003 "Remix! Special Fan Edition" DVD.

By 2020, Empire Records was available to stream on YouTube Movies and Google Play.

== Legacy ==
Although "Rex Manning Day" on April 8, the date Rex appears at Empire Records in the film, isn't mentioned in the film, it shows up on a flyer on screen and as a DVD image extra. In 2015, for Rex Manning Day, Brooklyn's Rough Trade Records dressed its storefront to look like the record store in the film, with Ethan Embry, Johnny Whitworth, and Gwar appearing.

I was just talking to the writer [Carol Heikkinen], and she was saying it's in one of the drafts ... April 8th is the same day they found Kurt Cobain's body. It's not the day he died. We shot that the same year they found him, so it represents the death of a rock star. Nobody ever says it in the movie. Nobody ever says April 8th.

— Ethan Embry, to TheWrap in 2015

It became an Internet meme among the film's fans with #RexManningDay as a recurring trending hashtag on Twitter. GIFs commemorating the event show Embry's character bounding down the stairs from the store's loft, declaring "Not on Rex Manning Day!!"

Philadelphia's indie artist-run South Street Art Mart hosts an annual Rex Manning Day Block Party each year in April, where Empire Records and 90s fans alike take over the city block in front of the store with free live music, vendors, costumes and a life-size Rex Manning cutout.

The Prince Charles Cinema in Leicester Square, London screens the film on "Rex Manning Day" (April 8th) every year.

In the film, a sign by the cash register shows the logo for the Richard Linklater 1993 film Dazed and Confused. The Richard Linklater 2003 film, School of Rock later references Empire Records.

== Musical adaptation ==
It was announced on April 6, 2018, that a musical adaptation of the movie was aiming for Broadway in 2020. The announcement stated that the show would be produced by Bill Weiner; would have music and lyrics by Zoe Sarnak and its book written by Carol Heikkinen, but was put on hold due to the COVID-19 pandemic. On December 7, 2021, it was announced that a table reading of the musical would be held at Roundabout Studios in New York City, directed by Trip Cullman with a cast featuring Kathryn Gallagher, Drew Gehling and Rebecca Naomi Jones, among others. On March 7, 2024, it was announced that the musical would have its world premiere at the McCarter Theatre Center in Princeton, New Jersey, set to run from September 6 - October 6.
