= Pound (band) =

American rock band

- Also known as: Flywheel
- Origin: Poughkeepsie, New York
- Genres: Post-grunge, alternative rock
- Label: Island Records

Pound (later Flywheel) was an American rock band from Poughkeepsie, New York.

== History ==
Four of the members of Pound were in a New York glam metal band in the early 1990s. Later in the decade, they went on to be signed with EMI Music Publishing working closely with then EMI V.P. Evan Lamberg Led by Pat Gasperini In 1999, they signed with Island Records and released their debut album, Same Old Life, produced by Gregg Wattenberg & Pat Gasperini Engineered by Mike Fraser Mixed By Tom Lord-Alge and Mastered by Ted Jenson. The album's lead single, "Upside Down", was a rock radio hit in America, reaching No. 15 on the Billboard Mainstream Rock Tracks chart that year. Also The 1999 Breakthrough Rock Band of the year coming in at #10 at Mainstream Rock and Active Rock top 40 Billboard Charts. The group left Island in 2000 and reconstituted itself as Flywheel; its first album under the new name was released in 2003. A follow-up release, also self-titled, appeared in 2005.

== Members ==
- Pat Gasperini - vocals, guitar (Pound, Flywheel)
- Jason Terwilliger - vocals (Pound), guitar (Pound, Flywheel)
- Jerry Terwilliger - drums (Pound, Flywheel)
- Corey Ray DiGiovanni - guitar / Vocals ( Pound )
- Sandy Nardone - bass (Pound, Flywheel)
- Jimmy Crifo - drums (Flywheel)
- Stephen Bell - vocals (Flywheel)

== Discography ==
Pound

- Same Old Life (Island Records, 1999)

Flywheel

- Flywheel (Electric Records, 2003)
- Flywheel (2005)
