= No Chocolate Cake =

Studio album by Gin Blossoms
- Released: September 28, 2010
- Genres: Alternative rock, power pop
- Length: 43:14
- Label: 429
- Producers: Jesse Valenzuela, Danny Wilde, Robin Wilson, Scotty Johnson

Gin Blossoms chronology
| Rarities (2009) | No Chocolate Cake (2010) | Icon (2011) |

Professional ratings
Review scores
| Source | Rating |
|---|---|
| AllMusic | 3/5 stars |
| antiMusic | 3.5/5 stars |
| The Aquarian Weekly | D |
| Billboard | (85/100) |
| The Daily Vault | B |
| PopMatters | 6/10 stars |
| Sputnikmusic | (3/5) |

No Chocolate Cake is the fifth studio album by power pop band Gin Blossoms. It was released on September 28, 2010, worldwide, and the first single, "Miss Disarray", was released to radio stations on August 2, 2010. The album reached #1 on Amazon.com MP3 album charts on the release date. No Chocolate Cake entered the Billboard 200 album chart at number 73 after selling 7,000 copies in its first week of release. It was the album's peak position, after falling off the chart the following week.

"Miss Disarray" gathered a sizable amount of airplay on hot adult contemporary radio stations and reached the Top 50 on that format during late October 2010. The opening track "Don't Change for Me" is a cover of a Matthew Moon song.

== Track listing ==
| No. | Title | Writer(s) | Producer(s) | Length |
|---|---|---|---|---|
| 1. | "Don't Change for Me" | Jesse Valenzuela; Danny Wilde; Matthew Moon | Jesse Valenzuela; Danny Wilde | 4:05 |
| 2. | "I Don't Want to Lose You Now" | Valenzuela; Wilde; Brad Warren; Brett Warren | Valenzuela; Wilde | 4:11 |
| 3. | "Miss Disarray" | Valenzuela; Wilde; Graham Colton | Valenzuela; Wilde | 3:30 |
| 4. | "Wave Bye Bye" | Robin Wilson | Robin Wilson | 4:07 |
| 5. | "I'm Ready" | Valenzuela; Wilson; Wilde; Sue Sandberg | Valenzuela; Wilde | 4:22 |
| 6. | "Somewhere Tonight" | Valenzuela; Wilde | Valenzuela; Wilde | 3:56 |
| 7. | "Go Crybaby" | Wilson | Wilson | 5:00 |
| 8. | "If You'll Be Mine" | Valenzuela | Valenzuela; Wilde | 3:14 |
| 9. | "Dead or Alive on the 405" | Valenzuela; Craig Northey | Valenzuela; Wilde | 3:02 |
| 10. | "Something Real" | Wilson; Jamie Woolford | Wilson | 4:03 |
| 11. | "Goin' to California" | Scotty Johnson; Wilson | Valenzuela; Wilde; Scotty Johnson | 3:44 |

iTunes Store bonus track
| No. | Title | Length |
|---|---|---|
| 12. | "Please Don't Ask Me" | 3:43 |

== Personnel ==
Gin Blossoms

- Robin Wilson – lead vocals, background vocals, guitars, tambourine
- Bill Leen – bass guitar
- Scotty Johnson – guitars, background vocals, piano
- Jesse Valenzuela – guitars, background vocals, keyboards
- John Richardson – drums

Additional musicians

- Danny Wilde – keyboards, shakers, programming
- Dave Zeman – organ, piano
- Chase Duddy – drums (5)
- Darryl Icard – bass (5)
- Scott Kusmirek – drums (7)

Technical and artistic personnel

- Danny Wilde – engineer (1–4, 5, 6, 8, 9), mixing
- Jon Pines – additional recording (1–4, 5, 6, 8, 9)
- Jon Weil – engineer (4, 7, 10), additional recording (11)
- Robb Vallier – additional recording (4, 7, 10), drums engineer (11)
- George Keller – additional recording (4, 7, 10)
- Jamie Woolford – additional recording (11)
- Jesse Valenzuela – mixing
- Dave Collins – mastering
- David Alan Kogut – art direction & photography

== Charts ==
| Chart (2010) | Peak position |
|---|---|
| US Billboard 200 | 73 |
| US Independent Albums (Billboard) | 14 |
| US Top Alternative Albums (Billboard) | 17 |
| US Top Rock Albums (Billboard) | 27 |
