= Miss Disarray =

Single by Gin Blossoms

from the album No Chocolate Cake
- Released: 2010
- Recorded: 2010
- Genre: Pop rock, jangle pop
- Length: 3:30
- Label: 429
- Songwriter(s): Graham Colton, Jesse Valenzuela, Danny Wilde

Gin Blossoms singles chronology
"Long Tine Gone" (2006)	"Miss Disarray" (2010)	"Wave Bye Bye" (2011)

Miss Disarray is the first single from the Gin Blossoms 2010 album No Chocolate Cake. The single barely missed out on Billboard's Adult Top 40 Chart.

"Miss Disarray" gathered a sizable amount of airplay on Hot AC and reached the Top 50 on that format during late October 2010.
