= Follow You Down =

1996 single by Gin Blossoms

Single by Gin Blossoms

from the album Congratulations I'm Sorry
- Released: January 30, 1996
- Studio: Vintage Recorders (Phoenix)
- Genre: Alternative rock
- Length: 4:30 (album version); 3:45 (single version)
- Label: A&M
- Songwriters: Bill Leen; Jesse Valenzuela; Phillip Rhodes; Robin Wilson; Scott Johnson
- Producers: John Hampton; Gin Blossoms

Gin Blossoms singles chronology
"Til I Hear It from You" (1995)	"Follow You Down" (1996)	"Day Job" (1996)

Music video
- "Follow You Down" on YouTube

"Follow You Down" is a song by American rock band Gin Blossoms, and the first single released from their album Congratulations I'm Sorry. It was released as a double A-side single with "Til I Hear It from You" in the United States. The song reached number nine on the US Billboard Hot 100 in a 46-week stay on the chart. It also became the band's second number-one single in Canada, after "Til I Hear It from You", and reached number 30 in the United Kingdom.

== Background ==
According to an interview by Songfacts with Gin Blossoms songwriter Jesse Valenzuela, this song was written at the very end of the recording process for the Congratulations I'm Sorry album. Valenzuela recalled:

We were working on the record, and I'd come home at night to my hotel room, and I had those chords and I finished writing by the time we got home. And we'd already finished the record, but I had this great song, so I demoed it up and I sent it to my main A&R man, David Anderle, the great David Anderle, and he said, "Why are you hiding this thing? Let's put it on the record." So we went and recorded it right away.

The song would ultimately become the biggest hit on the album, reaching number nine on the Billboard Hot 100.

== Critical reception ==
Larry Flick of Billboard spoke positively of "Follow You Down", commenting that the song showcases "[the Gin Blossoms'] knack for crafting perfect pop hooks with sing-along lyrics". Greg Kot of the Chicago Tribune referred to the song as "easy-listening alterna-rock of the first order".

== Track listings and formats ==
- Australian and US maxi-CD single
1. "Follow You Down" (Edit) – 3:45
2. "Til I Hear It from You" (LP version) – 3:46
3. "Seeing Stars" – 3:44
4. "Idiot Summer" – 4:10
- US 7-inch vinyl, cassette, and CD single
1. "Follow You Down" (edit) – 3:45
2. "Til I Hear It from You" (LP version) – 3:46
- German CD single and UK cassette single
1. "Follow You Down" (edit) – 3:45
2. "Allison Road" (LP version) – 3:18
3. "Until I Fall Away" (LP version) – 3:51
4. "Follow You Down" (LP version) – 4:30
- UK CD single
1. "Follow You Down" (edit) – 3:47
2. "Not Only Numb" (live) – 3:14
3. "My Car" (live) – 4:09
4. "Whitewash" (live) – 3:19
- Netherlands CD single
1. "Follow You Down" (Edit) – 3:45
2. "Allison Road" (LP Version) – 3:18

== Credits and personnel ==
Credits and personnel are adapted from Congratulations I'm Sorry album liner notes.

- Robin Wilson – vocals, acoustic guitar, harmonica
- Jesse Valenzuela – guitars, vocals
- Phillip Rhodes – drums, percussion, background vocals
- Bill Leen – bass, background vocals
- Scott Johnson – guitars, background vocals
- John Hampton – producer, engineering, mixing
- Erick Flettrich – engineering
- Billy Moss – assistant engineer at Vintage Recorders (Phoenix)
- Billy Siegle – pre-production engineer
- David Collins – mastering at A&M Mastering Studios (Hollywood)

== Charts ==
=== Weekly charts ===
Chart (1996)	Peak position
Australia (ARIA)	65
Canada Top Singles (RPM)	1
Canada Rock/Alternative (RPM)	19
Europe (Eurochart Hot 100)	98
Iceland (Íslenski Listinn Topp 40)	35
Scottish Singles Sales (Official Charts)	29
UK Singles (Official Charts)	30
US Billboard Hot 100 with "Til I Hear It from You"	9
US Adult Alternative Airplay (Billboard)	1
US Adult Contemporary (Billboard)	22
US Adult Pop Airplay (Billboard)	3
US Alternative Airplay (Billboard)	8
US Mainstream Rock (Billboard)	6
US Pop Airplay (Billboard)	5
US Cash Box Top 100	7

=== Year-end charts ===
Chart (1996)	Position
Canada Top Singles (RPM)	7
US Billboard Hot 100	15
US Adult Top 40 (Billboard)	11
US Mainstream Rock Tracks (Billboard)	46
US Modern Rock Tracks (Billboard)	63
US Top 40/Mainstream (Billboard)	17
US Triple-A (Billboard)	7

=== Decade-end charts ===
Chart (1990s)	Position
Canada (Nielsen SoundScan)	49

== Release history ==
Region	Date	Format(s)	Label(s)	Ref.
United States	January 30, 1996	Contemporary hit radio	A&M	
Japan	February 5, 1996	Mini-CD	A&M	
United Kingdom	April 15, 1996	CD; cassette	A&M	
