= New Miserable Experience =

Studio album by Gin Blossoms
- Released: August 4, 1992
- Recorded: February–March 1992
- Studios: Ardent Studios (Memphis, Tennessee)
- Genres: Alternative rock; jangle pop; power pop
- Length: 45:02
- Label: A&M
- Producers: Gin Blossoms; John Hampton

Gin Blossoms chronology
Up and Crumbling (1991)	New Miserable Experience (1992)	Congratulations I'm Sorry (1996)

Alternate cover
- Re-release cover

Singles from New Miserable Experience
- 1. "Lost Horizons" Released: 1992; 2. "Mrs. Rita" Released: 1993; 3. "Hey Jealousy" Released: June 1993; 4. "Until I Fall Away" Released: August 1993; 5. "Found Out About You" Released: November 1993; 6. "Allison Road" Released: 1994

New Miserable Experience is the second studio album by American alternative rock band Gin Blossoms, released on August 4, 1992. The album was released to little fanfare and relatively lackluster reviews. However, nearly a year after its release the lead single "Hey Jealousy" entered the top 40 in the United States and then in various charts around the world. With "Found Out About You" following as a single a few months later, the album eventually reached multi-platinum status.

== Background ==
The band's original lead guitarist, Doug Hopkins, was fired near the conclusion of the recording sessions for the album, ostensibly for his persistent alcohol problems. His replacement, Scott Johnson, is listed as a member of the band in the liner notes, but did not play on the album. Just as the album was becoming a success at the end of 1993, Hopkins died by suicide.

New Miserable Experience's initial release had completely different packaging. The album's original cover artwork depicted the Arizona desert. Several songs on the album were written with references to the area, people, and events surrounding the band at the time, such as "Mrs. Rita", which is a song about a local psychic from the Gin Blossoms' hometown of Tempe, Arizona. The majority of the songs rely on a melody-driven pop style, while the final track, "Cheatin'", leans into country.

The album was re-released in late summer 1993 with a new cover without the original Arizona desert photo. This re-release in conjunction with A&M's newfound support of the album. Lead singer Robin Wilson specifically requested artistic control over the new release, recalling, "I did insist that I have total control over the new cover. So what you see on New Miserable Experience, those are all my photographs. I did the layout, I handwrote all the lyrics and I made sure that I had control over that."

== Musical style ==
The album's music has been described as alternative rock, jangle pop, and power pop.

== Critical reception ==
Professional ratings
Review scores
Source	Rating
AllMusic	4/5 stars
Blender	3/5 stars
Chicago Tribune	2/4 stars
Los Angeles Times	3/4 stars
Music Week	3/5 stars
Pitchfork	8.1/10
The Rolling Stone Album Guide	3.5/5 stars
The Village Voice	C+

Rolling Stone critic Paul Evans praised New Miserable Experience, saying it "sounds both fresh and highly personal." In his review for AllMusic, Rick Anderson called the album "a tight and lean collection of brilliant, edgy pop music". Evan Rytlewski of Pitchfork described it over 20 years later as "a tender and sincere record that made the band famous while they grappled with tragedy."

== Track listing ==
No.	Title	Writer(s)	Length
1.	"Lost Horizons"	Doug Hopkins	3:20
2.	"Hey Jealousy"	Hopkins	3:56
3.	"Mrs. Rita"	Jesse Valenzuela; Jim Swafford	4:25
4.	"Until I Fall Away"	Robin Wilson; Valenzuela	3:51
5.	"Hold Me Down"	Hopkins; Wilson	4:50
6.	"Cajun Song"	Valenzuela	2:56
7.	"Hands Are Tied"	Valenzuela	3:17
8.	"Found Out About You"	Hopkins	3:53
9.	"Allison Road"	Wilson	3:18
10.	"29"	Valenzuela	4:18
11.	"Pieces of the Night"	Hopkins	4:33
12.	"Cheatin'"	Valenzuela; Hopkins	3:25
Total length:			45:02

To celebrate the album's tenth anniversary in 2002, a deluxe edition containing an extra disc of demos, outtakes, and live performances was released by the label. The Rarities Album was released separately in Abbreviated form in 2010 as Rarities, missing the three cuts from Dusted.

Reissue bonus tracks
No.	Title	Writer(s)	Length
1.	"Something Wrong"	Valenzuela	2:40
2.	"Slave Dealer's Daughter"	Hopkins; Bill Leen	2:32
3.	"Fireworks"	Hopkins	3:05
4.	"Keli Richards"	Hopkins; Leen	3:04
5.	"Just South of Nowhere"	Valenzuela	3:26
6.	"Angels Tonight"	Hopkins	3:33
7.	"Blue Eyes Bleeding"	Hopkins	2:30
8.	"Soul Deep"	Wayne Carson Thompson	3:05
9.	"Heart Away"	Wilson	2:21
10.	"Cold River Dick"	Wilson; Valenzuela; Leen; Phillip Rhodes; Scott Johnson	1:16
11.	"Christine Irene"	Wilson; Valenzuela	2:42
12.	"Number One"	John Lennon; Paul McCartney; Neil Innes	2:35
13.	"Idiot Summer"	Wilson	4:13
14.	"Back of a Car"	Alex Chilton; Andy Hummel	2:43
15.	"Allison Road '94" (Remix)	Wilson	3:22
16.	"Hold Me Down" (Live)	Hopkins; Wilson	4:55
17.	"Hey Jealousy" (Live)	Hopkins	3:57
18.	"Mrs. Rita" (Live)	Swafford; Valenzuela	4:20
19.	"29" (Live)	Valenzuela	4:07
20.	"Movin' On Up" (Live)	Jeff Barry; Ja'net Dubois	2:57
21.	"Folsom Prison Blues" (Live)	Johnny Cash	3:08
22.	"Pieces of the Night" (with piano ending)	Hopkins	4:20

- Tracks 1–3: from Dusted (1989)
- Tracks 4–6: from Up and Crumbling (1991)
- Track 7: previously unreleased; outtake from New Miserable Experience (1992)
- Tracks 8–11: from Shut Up and Smoke, and "Soul Deep" also appears on the soundtrack album from the movie Speed (1994)
- Track 12: previously unreleased; outtake from Shut Up and Smoke (1994)
- Track 13: from Music from the Motion Picture Wayne's World 2 (1993)
- Track 14: previously unreleased; intended for a Big Star tribute album which was eventually released a few years later as Big Star, Small World (1994)
- Track 15: alternate version of the same song from New Miserable Experience, and also appears on the re-released "Allison Road" single (1994)
- Tracks 16–21: recorded live on May 13, 1993, at Belly Up Tavern in Solana Beach, California, originally released on "Found Out About You" (1993)
- Track 22: previously unreleased; alternate version of the same song from New Miserable Experience (1992)

== Personnel ==
=== Gin Blossoms ===
- Robin Wilson – lead vocals, acoustic guitar
- Doug Hopkins – guitars (Credited for performance and writing, uncredited as an active bandmember)
- Jesse Valenzuela – guitars, mandolin, background vocals, lead vocals on "Cheatin'"
- Bill Leen – bass guitar
- Phillip Rhodes – percussion, drums

=== Additional personnel ===
- Robert Becker – piano on "Until I Fall Away" and "Pieces of the Night"
- C. J. Chenier – accordion on "Cajun Song"
- Robby Turner – pedal steel guitar on "Cheatin'" and "Cajun Song"

=== Production ===
- Producers: Gin Blossoms, John Hampton
- Engineer: John Hampton
- Assistant Engineer: James "Left Of" Senter
- Mixing: John Hampton
- Mastering: George Marino
- Art direction: Barrie Goshko
- Design: Barrie Goshko
- Photography: Jay Blakesberg, Robin Wilson
- Crew: Jim Coleman, Scott Guess, Mike Chappell
- Recorded at Ardent Studios (Memphis, Tennessee), except: "Allison Road" and "Mrs. Rita", recorded at: AB Recorders (Phoenix, Arizona) by Andy Barret

Original 1992 release:

- Art direction and design: Rowan Moore
- Photography: Dennis Keeley
- Radiator: Kelly Ray

== Chart performance ==
=== Weekly charts ===
Weekly chart performance for New Miserable Experience
Chart (1992–1994)	Peak position
Australian Albums (ARIA)	63
Canada Top Albums/CDs (RPM)	43
UK Albums (Official Charts)	53
US Billboard 200	30
US Heatseekers Albums (Billboard)	1

=== Year-end charts ===
Year-end chart performance for New Miserable Experience
Chart (1994)	Position
US Billboard 200	54

== Certifications ==
Certifications for New Miserable Experience
Region	Certification	Certified units/sales
Canada (Music Canada)	Gold	50,000^{^}
United States (RIAA)	4× Platinum	4,000,000^{^}
^{^} Shipments figures based on certification alone.
