= Hey Jealousy =

1989 song by Gin Blossoms

Single by Gin Blossoms

from the album New Miserable Experience
- B-side: "29"
- Released: June 1993
- Genre: Alternative rock; pop rock
- Length: 3:56
- Label: A&M
- Songwriter: Doug Hopkins
- Producers: Gin Blossoms; John Hampton

Gin Blossoms singles chronology
| "Mrs. Rita" (1993) | "Hey Jealousy" (1993) | "Until I Fall Away" (1993) |

"Hey Jealousy" is a song by American rock band Gin Blossoms. The song was included on the group's debut album, Dusted (1989), and was re-recorded for their 1992 album, New Miserable Experience. It was written by lead guitarist Doug Hopkins, who was fired from the band before New Miserable Experience was released.

"Hey Jealousy" became the band's signature song, reaching number 25 on the US Billboard Hot 100 in 1993. It peaked at number 20 in Iceland, number 24 in the United Kingdom, number 28 in Australia, and number 39 in Canada. "Hey Jealousy" was certified gold in the United States.

== Background ==
"Hey Jealousy" (1992 re-recording) by Gin Blossoms
Clip from "Hey Jealousy"

"Hey Jealousy" was inspired by Hopkins' desire to get back with his ex-girlfriend Cathy Swafford, who had left him because of his drinking and cheating. Ed Masley of The Arizona Republic describes the song this way:

...[A guy] shows up at his ex's house too drunk to drive and asks if he can spend the night, a case he tries to make with "You can see I'm in no shape for driving and anyway, I've got no place to go."
She was the best he'd ever had, he admits before bringing the verse to a humiliating close with "If I hadn't blown the whole thing years ago, I might not be alone." But he's not giving up just yet, heading into the chorus full of hope as he attempts to sell her on a promise of "Tomorrow we can drive around this town and let the cops chase us around/ The past is gone but something might be found to take its place".
There's too much self-awareness here to win a reasonable person over ("If you don't expect too much from me, you might not be let down.").

Hopkins originally included the line "you can trust me not to drink" in "Hey Jealousy", but lead singer Robin Wilson insisted on changing "drink" to "think," having grown tired of Hopkins' lyrical references to his drinking problem. Wilson explained:

Yes, because there were so many references to drinking, you know, in our songs. I would try to steer it away from that all the time. The band was called Gin Blossoms, which, as you know, is a reference to heavy drinking. We had all of these lyrics about it, and it was something we seemed to be talking about too much. I didn't think it was that big of a deal to change one word.

Hopkins, who was dismissed from the band due to alcohol abuse before New Miserable Experience was released, was upset that Wilson changed the lyric. When asked about the song after it became a hit, Hopkins expressed discomfort with the track, stating that he turned it off when he heard it on the radio.

== Release ==
"Hey Jealousy" was included as a track on Gin Blossoms' 1989 debut album, Dusted. It was re-recorded and released as a track on New Miserable Experience. Although New Miserable Experience initially stalled in the charts, it received a second promotional push that benefited "Hey Jealousy" in the form of a new music video. Wilson noted,

One day we get a call from the label that they were going to try 'Jealousy' again and make another video for it. The budget for the first [video] was five grand; the second was ten grand; and the third was forty grand. That's when I was like, "Holy shit, they're serious." At that point we had been in the van for six months, just a blur of college cafeterias, interviews and opening for whoever we can.

"Hey Jealousy" made its debut on the Billboard Top 100 on July 24, 1993. It was the band's first hit single, peaking at number 25 on the Billboard chart on October 16, 1993. Guitarist Jesse Valenzuela joked, "It got everywhere. You can hear it at the Lowe's hardware". "Hey Jealousy" has become known as the band's signature song and one of its most enduring hits; it was certified gold by the Recording Industry Association of America (RIAA).

== Critical reception ==
A review by Rolling Stone called the song "manna for radio", highlighting "the ease with which this quintet casts hooks". AllMusic staff writer Rick Anderson identified "Hey Jealousy" and "Until I Fall Away" as the two songs from New Miserable Experience "that leave the deepest impression".

Ed Masley of The Arizona Republic listed the song as the Gin Blossoms' best song on his list of the band's top 30 tracks, writing, "It's the obvious choice for a reason -- the signature song that started as the breakthrough hit that made the whole thing possible. And it's a great song, brilliantly arranged so as to maximize the tension and release, its understated verses taking on intensity in a wave of distorted guitars as the song makes its way to that singalong chorus."

In a review of the single, Ryan Wasoba of Crawdaddy! considered "Hey Jealousy" more closely in light of Hopkins's struggles, arguing:

With Hopkins functioning as the protagonist, "Hey Jealousy" outlines a cause for intervention. Coming from the mouth of an alcoholic, the deprecating claims in the song ... sting with accuracy. Other lines become the simplistic slurrings of a friend who’s had one too many ... Even the song’s peppy chorus is recontextualized, its hopefulness shriveled into empty promise.

But despite this context, Wasoba still lauded the track as a "bona fide have-a-kick-ass-summer jam": "Through all the potential melancholy, 'Hey Jealousy' is still a party. The guitars still jangle, the tambourine still shimmies. The solo is still totally bitchin'."

Pitchfork said, "Wilson sings, the words rippling out uncannily smooth, their inherent desperation buffed to a shine. The levity in the song's arrangement—the jangling guitar arpeggios, the shivers of tambourine—belie the weight of the addiction and mental illness Hopkins found himself tangled in while writing, which dragged him to his death."

In 2023, Tyler Golsen of Far Out called "Hey Jealousy" "a candy-coated hand grenade that can still catch you off guard 35 years after Hopkins first conceived of it". Golsen also described the song as "a strange beacon of hope and optimism" and a "mix of despondent lyrics and aggressively catchy pop-rock guitars".

== Track listings ==
- US cassette single

A. "Hey Jealousy" – 3:56
B. "29" – 4:18

- UK cassette single

A1. "Hey Jealousy" – 3:56
A2. "Keli Richards" – 3:04
B1. "Cold River Dick" – 1:14
B2. "Kristene Irene" – 2:40

- European and Australasian CD single
1. "Hey Jealousy" – 3:56
2. "Allison Road" – 3:18
3. "Just South of Nowhere" – 3:26
- Australian cassette single

A. "Hey Jealousy"
B. "Just South of Nowhere"

- UK 7-inch single

A1. "Hey Jealousy" – 3:56
A2. "Cold River Dick" – 1:14
B1. "Kristene Irene" – 2:40
B2. "Keli Richards" – 3:04

- UK CD single
1. "Hey Jealousy" – 3:56
2. "Cajun Song" – 2:56
3. "Just South of Nowhere" – 3:26
4. "Angels Tonight" – 3:34
- UK maxi-CD single
1. "Hey Jealousy" – 3:56
2. "Allison Road" – 3:18
3. "Just South of Nowhere" – 3:26
4. "Angels Tonight" – 3:34

== Charts ==
=== Weekly charts ===
Weekly chart performance for "Hey Jealousy"
| Chart (1993–1994) | Peak position |
|---|---|
| Australia (ARIA) | 28 |
| Canada Top Singles (RPM) | 39 |
| Europe (Eurochart Hot 100) | 66 |
| Iceland (Íslenski Listinn Topp 40) | 20 |
| Scottish Singles Sales (Official Charts) | 40 |
| UK Singles (Official Charts) | 24 |
| UK Airplay (Music Week) | 22 |
| US Billboard Hot 100 | 25 |
| US Mainstream Rock (Billboard) | 4 |
| US Pop Airplay (Billboard) | 20 |
| US Cash Box Top 100 | 23 |

=== Year-end charts ===
Year-end chart performance for "Hey Jealousy"
| Chart (1993) | Position |
|---|---|
| US Billboard Hot 100 | 95 |
| US Album Rock Tracks (Billboard) | 13 |

== Release history ==
Release dates and formats for "Hey Jealousy"
| Region | Date | Format(s) | Label(s) | Ref. |
|---|---|---|---|---|
| United States | June 1993 | CD; cassette | A&M | |
| United Kingdom | January 24, 1994 | 7-inch vinyl; CD; cassette | Fontana | |
| Australia | April 4, 1994 | CD; cassette | A&M | |
