= Learning the Hard Way =

"Learning The Hard Way"

Single by Gin Blossoms

from the album Major Lodge Victory
- B-side: "Learning The Hard Way (Radio Edit)"
- Released: 2006
- Genre: Jangle pop, power pop
- Length: 4:09
- Label: Hybrid
- Songwriter(s): Jesse Valenzuela

Gin Blossoms singles chronology
"Not Only Numb" (1996)	"Learning The Hard Way" (2006)	"Long Time Gone" (2006)

"Learning the Hard Way" is a song by American power pop band Gin Blossoms, and was the lead-off single from their fourth album Major Lodge Victory. It was promoted late summer and fall of 2006, and received heavy AAA airplay.

Gin Blossoms also performed Learning The Hard Way live on XM Radio, for which there is a video on YouTube.

Jesse Valenzuela told Songfacts that he "started ruminating" on a 5 or 6 hour drive between Phoenix and Los Angeles and "just kind of wrote down the song when I got home."

== Chart performance ==
Chart (2006)	Peak position
US Adult Alternative Songs (Billboard)	22
