= Until I Fall Away =

1993 single by Gin Blossoms

Single by Gin Blossoms

from the album New Miserable Experience
- Released: August 1993
- Length: 3:50
- Label: A&M
- Songwriters: Robin Wilson, Jesse Valenzuela
- Producers: John Hampton, Gin Blossoms

Gin Blossoms singles chronology
"Hey Jealousy" (1993)	"Until I Fall Away" (1993)	"Found Out About You" (1993)

Music video
- "Until I Fall Away" on YouTube

"Until I Fall Away" is a song by American rock band Gin Blossoms from their second album, New Miserable Experience (1992). Released as a single in August 1993 by A&M Records, it reached number 13 on the US Billboard Modern Rock Tracks chart in 1994. The same year, it also peaked at number 51 on the US Cash Box Top 100, number 34 in Iceland and number 35 in Canada.

== Critical response ==
Larry Flick from Billboard magazine called the single "pure pop joy." Ed Masley of The Arizona Republic listed the song as the Gin Blossom's 15th-best song on his list of the band's top 30 tracks, writing that the song "certainly holds up as a pure pop song, from its yearning chorus, as a call and response between Wilson (who wrote the song with Valenzuela) and his bandmates, to a brilliantly constructed lead guitar break."

== Charts ==
Chart (1993–1994)	Peak position
Australia (ARIA)	122
Canada Top Singles (RPM)	35
Iceland (Íslenski Listinn Topp 40)	34
US Radio Songs (Billboard)	21
US Adult Contemporary (Billboard)	23
US Alternative Airplay (Billboard)	13
US Mainstream Rock Airplay (Billboard)	40
US Pop Airplay (Billboard)	13
US Cash Box Top 100	51
