= Wayne's World 2: Music from the Motion Picture =

Wayne's World 2: Music From The Motion Picture

Soundtrack album by Various Artists
- Released: December 14, 1993
- Recorded: 1969–1993
- Genres: Hard rock, heavy metal, soft rock, grunge, disco
- Length: 55:22
- Label: Reprise
- Producer: Various

Professional ratings
Review scores
| Source | Rating |
|---|---|
| AllMusic | 3/5 stars |
| Calgary Herald | C− |
| Entertainment Weekly | B |
| Music Week | 3/5 stars |
| Select | 3/5 medals |

Wayne's World 2: Music from the Motion Picture is the soundtrack album for the 1993 comedy sequel film Wayne's World 2. It features two live tracks from Aerosmith, and a version of "Louie, Louie" by Robert Plant.

== Track listing ==
1. "Louie, Louie" - Robert Plant (2:54)
2. "Dude (Looks Like a Lady)" - Aerosmith* (5:05)
3. "Idiot Summer" - Gin Blossoms (4:12)
4. "Superstar" - 'Superfan' (a collective including Chrissie Hynde on vocals and the musicians from Urge Overkill) (3:50)
5. "I Love Rock 'n' Roll" - Joan Jett & the Blackhearts (2:55)
6. "Spirit in the Sky" - Norman Greenbaum (4:03)
7. "Out There" - Dinosaur Jr. (5:53)
8. "Mary's House" - 4 Non Blondes (4:02)
9. "Radar Love" - Golden Earring (5:03)
10. "Can't Get Enough" - Bad Company (4:15)
11. "Frankenstein" - Edgar Winter (4:43)
12. "Shut Up and Dance" - Aerosmith* (4:43)
13. "Y.M.C.A." - Village People ('uncredited and a hidden track on some releases') (3:44)
- An asterisk (*) indicates live performances from the movie
- Songs featured in the film but not in the soundtrack album:
- "Batman Theme" - Neal Hefti
- "Dream Weaver" - Gary Wright
- "Rule Britannia" - Grenadier Guards Band
- "Wipe Out" - The Ventures
- "Step It Up" - Stereo MC's
- "The Girl from Ipanema" - Stan Getz and Astrud Gilberto
- "Romeo and Juliet - Fantasy Overture" - Berlin Radio Symphony Orchestra
- "Show Me the Way" - Peter Frampton
- "Hey Joe" - The Jimi Hendrix Experience
- "Mrs. Robinson" - Simon & Garfunkel
- "Age of Consent" - New Order
- "The Wind Cries Mary" - The Jimi Hendrix Experience
- "Wayne’s World Theme (Extended Version)" - Mike Myers & Dana Carvey

== Charts ==
| Chart (1993) | Peak position |
|---|---|
| Canada Top Albums/CDs (RPM) | 59 |
| German Albums (Offizielle Top 100) | 83 |
| US Billboard 200 | 78 |

== Certifications ==
| Region | Certification | Certified units/sales |
|---|---|---|
| Canada (Music Canada) | Gold | 50,000^{^} |
^{^} Shipments figures based on certification alone.
