= Jesse Valenzuela =

American rock musician (born 1962)

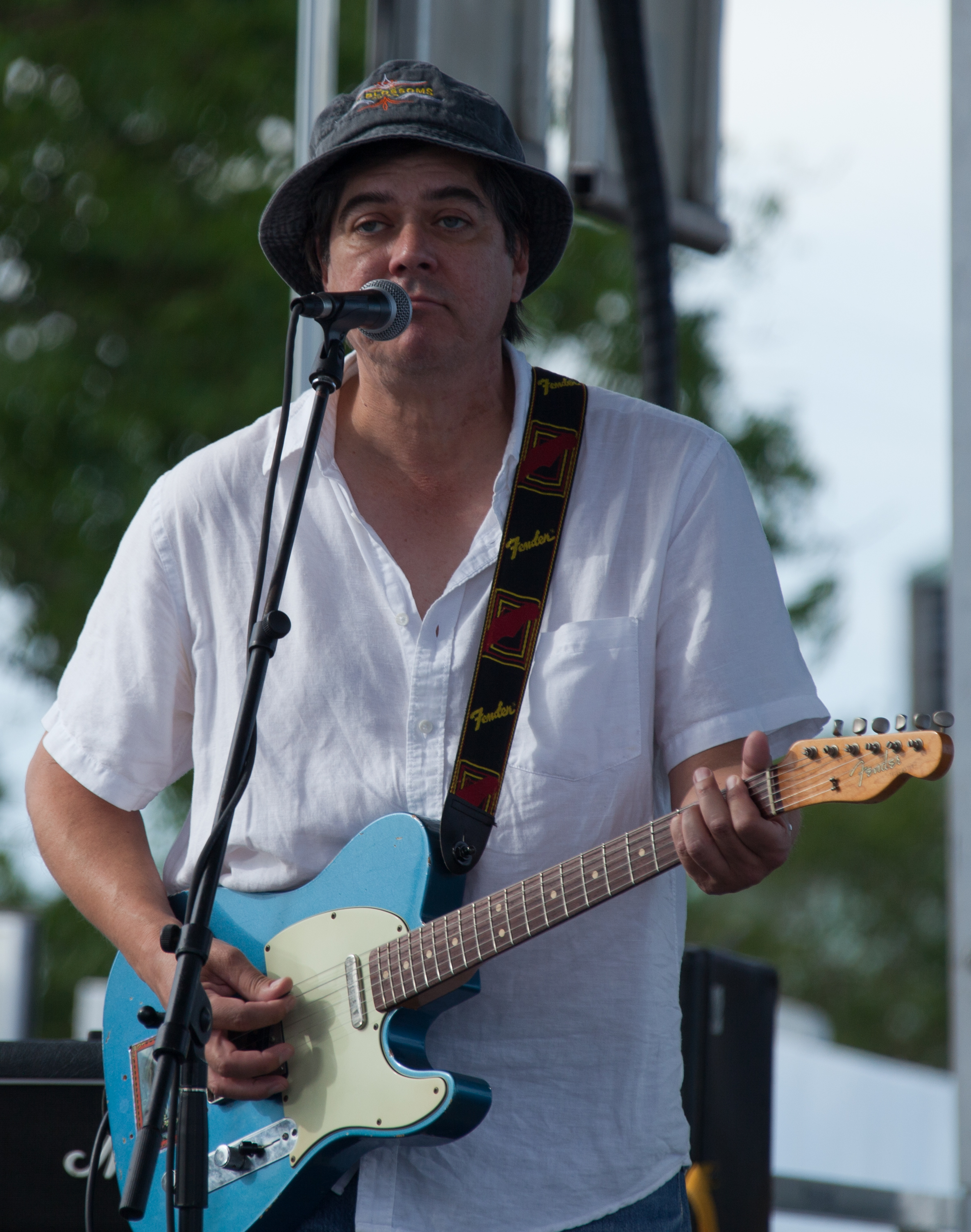
- Valenzuela performing with Gin Blossoms in 2013

Background information
- Born: May 22, 1962 (age 64)
- Occupations: Singer; musician; producer; songwriter
- Instruments: Vocals, guitar
- Member of: Gin Blossoms

Jesse Valenzuela (born May 22, 1962) is an American rock musician and singer who is perhaps best known as a member of the alternative rock band Gin Blossoms. He was originally the vocalist in Gin Blossoms when the band first formed in 1987.

In 1988, he switched roles with the band's new guitarist, Robin Wilson. He continued to be a member until the band's breakup in 1997, and reunited with the rest of the group in 2002.

As a songwriter, Valenzuela has written or co-written Gin Blossoms songs including "Til I Hear It From You," "Follow You Down," "Mrs. Rita," "Until I Fall Away" and "As Long As It Matters."

Valenzuela has talked about a lifelong fascination with music and the guitar. He began to play in public when he was 15.

"I've always been a fan of music," Valenzuela noted in a 2018 interview with Icon Vs. Icon. "I've gotten older now, and my mother's started handing over lots of photographs from my childhood. It seems that I always had a guitar in my hand as a kid. I do remember just wanting a guitar really badly and it was all I thought about at that age. I was playing in bars by the time I was 15."

Several years of honing his craft in the Arizona music world brought Valenzuela into contact with Gin Blossoms founder and Tempe neighbor Doug Hopkins – and in 1987, Valenzuela joined the band.

By 1989, the Gin Blossoms were fully up and running and released their first album, Dusted, with Hopkins serving as the principal songwriter but with Valenzuela contributing four tracks.

Although an independent, low-budget effort, Dusted planted a flag in the ground for the Arizona rockers. Some of its songs – "Lost Horizons," "Hey Jealousy" and "Found Out About You" – reached a wider audience when included on the band's major-label debut, 1992's New Miserable Experience. That album spawned six singles and achieved multi-platinum status.

All Music described New Miserable Experience as "a tight and lean collection of brilliant, edgy pop music." Rolling Stone called the album "fresh and highly personal," and said: "the ease with which this quintet casts hooks suggests that there's plenty more in store."

The band's follow-up album, released several years after Hopkins's 1993 suicide, bore the evocative title Congratulations I'm Sorry. The title was intended to summarize the sentiments expressed to band members arising from New Miserable Experience's success and Hopkins' death. Though it was recorded in harrowing circumstances and required other band members to take over songwriting duties, Congratulations ... I'm Sorry was a commercial success, reaching #10 on the Billboard charts.

All Music said the album was "filled with chiming guitars, sweet melodies, and simple, catchy hooks, as well as a sturdy grasp of traditional pop/rock songwriting that results in a number of gems." The Los Angeles Times praised album's "jangling, radio-friendly tunes."

Sandwiched between the two albums and appearing on the Empire Records movie soundtrack was the song that Billboard magazine called "The closest thing to a perfect pop song to hit radio in recent memory," Valenzuela's "'Til I Hear It From You." The double-A side single of "Til I Hear It From You"/"Follow You Down" is the Gin Blossom's top single, reaching #9 on the U.S. Billboard Hot 100 and rising to #1 in Canada.

Subsequent Gin Blossoms albums Major Lodge Victory (2006), No Chocolate Cake (2010) and Mixed Reality (2018) produced songs such as "Miss Disarray," "Learning the Hard Way" and "Heart Shaped Locket."

In addition to his work with the Gin Blossoms, Valenzuela has been active as a solo artist, session player, producer and composer for movies and television.

Valenzuela's work for film includes the song "Screwed Up," written with Susan Sandberg for the Farrelly Brothers' 2007 remake of The Heartbreak Kid. NBC featured his song "Change 4 Me," cowritten with Moon and Danny Wilde, in promotions for the 2008 Olympics. And "Follow You Down" was featured in the 2003 film How to Lose a Guy in 10 Days."

In 2004, he collaborated with Canadian singer-songwriter Craig Northey on the album Northey Valenzuela. They co-wrote and performed "Not A Lot Goin' On," the theme song to the Canadian sitcom Corner Gas.

In 2002, he released a solo album, Tunes Young People Will Enjoy., followed by Hotel Defeated in 2015. A third solo effort, Pete, was released in 2020.

In 2016, he released Prairie Wind, a collaboration with Danny Wilde, a founding member of The Rembrandts.

In 2022, Valenzuela was touring with the Gin Blossoms as the band was marking the 30th anniversary of the release of New Miserable Experience and was performing solo shows in the Phoenix area.

He is of Mexican American descent.

== Discography ==
- Dusted (1989)
- New Miserable Experience (1992)
- Congratulations I'm Sorry (1996)
- Major Lodge Victory (2006)
- No Chocolate Cake (2010)
- Mixed Reality (2018)

== Albums ==
- Tunes Young People Will Enjoy, Jesse Valenzuela, 2003
- Hotel Defeated, Jesse Valenzuela, 2015
- Pete, Jesse Valenzuela, 2020
- Northey-Valenzuela, Northey-Valenzuela, 2000
- Prairie Wind, Valenzuela-Wilde, 2016
