= Gin Blossoms =

American rock band

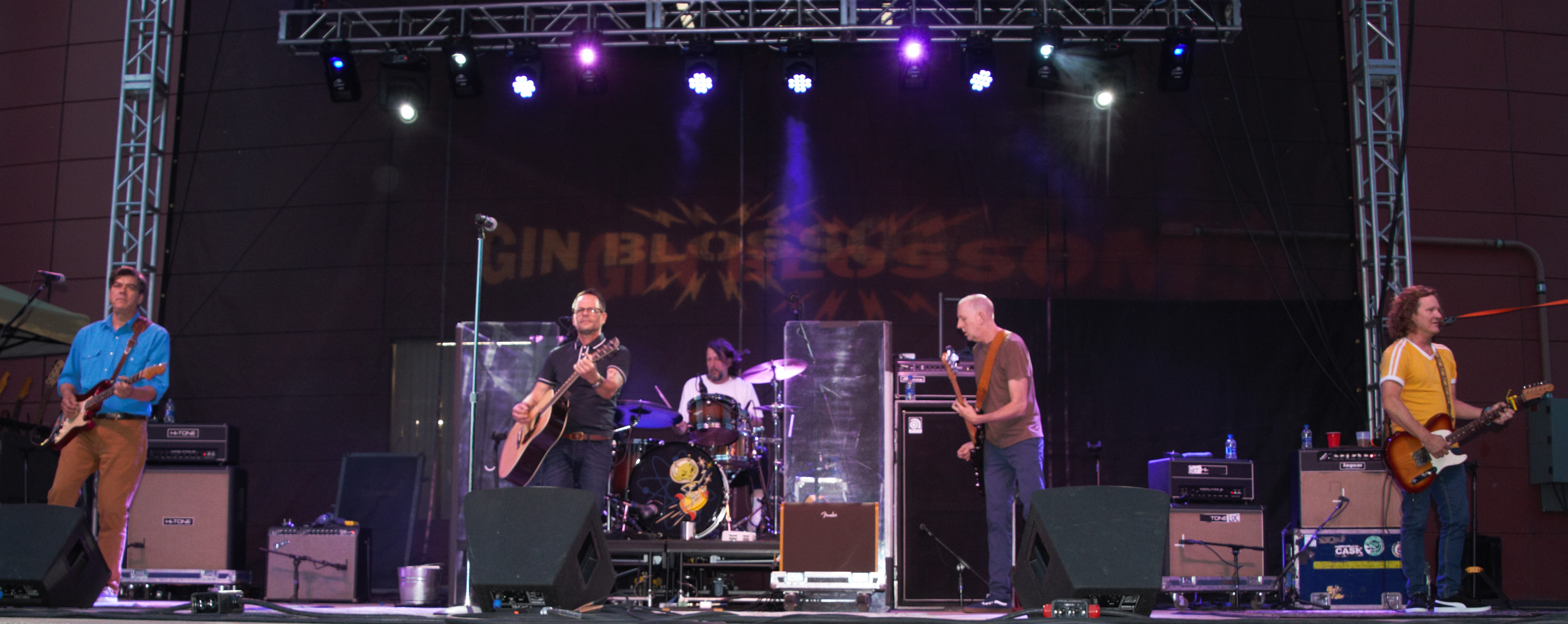
- Gin Blossoms in 2018

Background information
- Origin: Tempe, Arizona, U.S.
- Genres: Power pop; jangle pop; alternative rock; post-grunge
- Works: Discography
- Years active: 1987–1997; 2001–present
- Labels: A&M; Hybrid; 429
- Spinoffs: Gas Giants
- Members: Bill Leen; Jesse Valenzuela; Robin Wilson; Scott "Scotty" Johnson
- Past members: Doug Hopkins; Richard Taylor; Chris McCann; Steven Severson; Dan Henzerling; Phillip "Phil" Rhodes; Phil Leavitt; Gary Smith; Scott Kusmirek; John Richardson; Scott Hessel
- Website: www.ginblossoms.net

Gin Blossoms are an American rock band formed in 1987 in Tempe, Arizona. They rose to prominence following the 1992 release of their first major label album, New Miserable Experience, and the first single released from that album, "Hey Jealousy". "Hey Jealousy" became a Top 25 hit and went gold, and New Miserable Experience eventually went quadruple platinum; four other charting singles were released from the album. The band's follow-up album, Congratulations I'm Sorry (1996), went platinum, and the single "As Long as It Matters" was nominated for a Grammy Award. The band's other hits include "Found Out About You" (1993), "Til I Hear It from You" (1995), and "Follow You Down" (1996).

Gin Blossoms broke up in 1997. Since reuniting in 2001, the band has released Major Lodge Victory in 2006, No Chocolate Cake in 2010, and Mixed Reality in 2018.

== History ==
=== Early years ===
Gin Blossoms was founded in 1987. During the band's early years, its members included lead guitarist and songwriter Doug Hopkins, bassist Bill Leen, and lead vocalist Jesse Valenzuela. The lineup shifted multiple times, and other band members included Richard Taylor (rhythm guitar), Steven Severson (rhythm guitar), Chris McCann (drums), and Dan Henzerling (drums). Later, Robin Wilson replaced Severson as rhythm guitarist. The band's name comes from a photo of W.C. Fields in Kenneth Anger's book Hollywood Babylon, which bore the caption "W.C. Fields with gin blossoms", referring to the actor's telangiectasia-spotted face and rhinophymic nose by the slang term for the skin condition known as rosacea.

Gin Blossoms became well known around the band's hometown of Phoenix. In 1988, Wilson and Valenzuela had switched roles, with Wilson taking on lead vocal duties and Valenzuela concentrating on rhythm guitar. By 1989, Phillip Rhodes had replaced Henzerling on drums. Gin Blossoms independently recorded their first full-length album, Dusted, which was released in December 1989.

After being signed to A&M Records, the band began to work on their first major-label album. Initial attempts faltered and the band released an EP, Up and Crumbling, instead.

=== Mainstream success ===
Gin Blossoms named their second album New Miserable Experience. In February 1992, while still working to complete it, founding member and lead guitarist/songwriter Hopkins drank heavily and grew increasingly depressed. With the band members hesitant to fire Hopkins, A&M removed him from the band and withheld $15,000 owed to him until he agreed to sign over half of his publishing royalties and relinquish his mechanical royalties. Hopkins reluctantly agreed to these demands because of his dire financial situation. Scott Johnson was chosen by the band later that month as Hopkins' stand-in on tour; he became a permanent member in 1994.

New Miserable Experience became the band's breakthrough album. The first single released from the album was "Hey Jealousy", which had been written by Hopkins. The song reached No. 25 on the Billboard Hot 100 and No. 4 on Billboard's Mainstream Rock Tracks and later went gold, largely fueling the success of New Miserable Experience. Estranged from the band, Hopkins died by suicide on December 5, 1993. The following year, another song by Hopkins, "Found Out About You", also reached No. 25 on the Billboard Hot 100 and climbed to No. 1 on Billboard's Modern Rock Tracks. New Miserable Experience eventually reached quadruple platinum status.

Between their first and second albums, Gin Blossoms contributed the single "Til I Hear It from You" for the soundtrack of the 1995 film Empire Records. It reached No. 9 on the Billboard Hot 100. Their second major album, Congratulations I'm Sorry, was released in 1996. Yielding one top-ten hit ("Follow You Down", which peaked at No. 9 Billboard Hot 100), the album went platinum. The song "As Long as It Matters" was nominated for a Grammy Award for Best Pop Performance by a Duo or Group with Vocal.

With chart success came opportunities to appear as musical guests on late-night television. Between 1992 and 1996, Gin Blossoms appeared on shows such as Late Show with David Letterman (many times between 1992 and 1996), The Tonight Show with Jay Leno (1993, 1994, 1996), The Jon Stewart Show (1993), Late Night with Conan O'Brien (1996), and as a featured musical act on Saturday Night Live (1996). One appearance on the Late Show With David Letterman featured a joint performance with Gin Blossoms and the members of Kiss, performing the latter's "Christine Sixteen". Gin Blossoms became a favorite of Late Show musical director Paul Shaffer, and their music was often featured as the show cut to and from commercials. The band was also a featured performer in the closing credits of the movie Wayne's World 2 (1993), performing "Idiot Summer" on-screen as part of the fictional concert "Waynestock".

Without Doug and his songwriting, we never could have signed a record deal.

— Robin Wilson (People, 1994)

=== Breakup ===
Gin Blossoms broke up in 1997. Wilson and Rhodes launched the Gas Giants while Leen formed a band called Rai and then retired from music to operate a rare book store. Valenzuela fronted a short-lived outfit called the Low Watts, released a solo album, and kept busy writing and producing. Johnson joined another Tempe-based band, Roger Clyne and the Peacemakers. Wilson ventured into producing as well, at his Mayberry Studios in Tempe, Arizona (now called Uranus Studios).

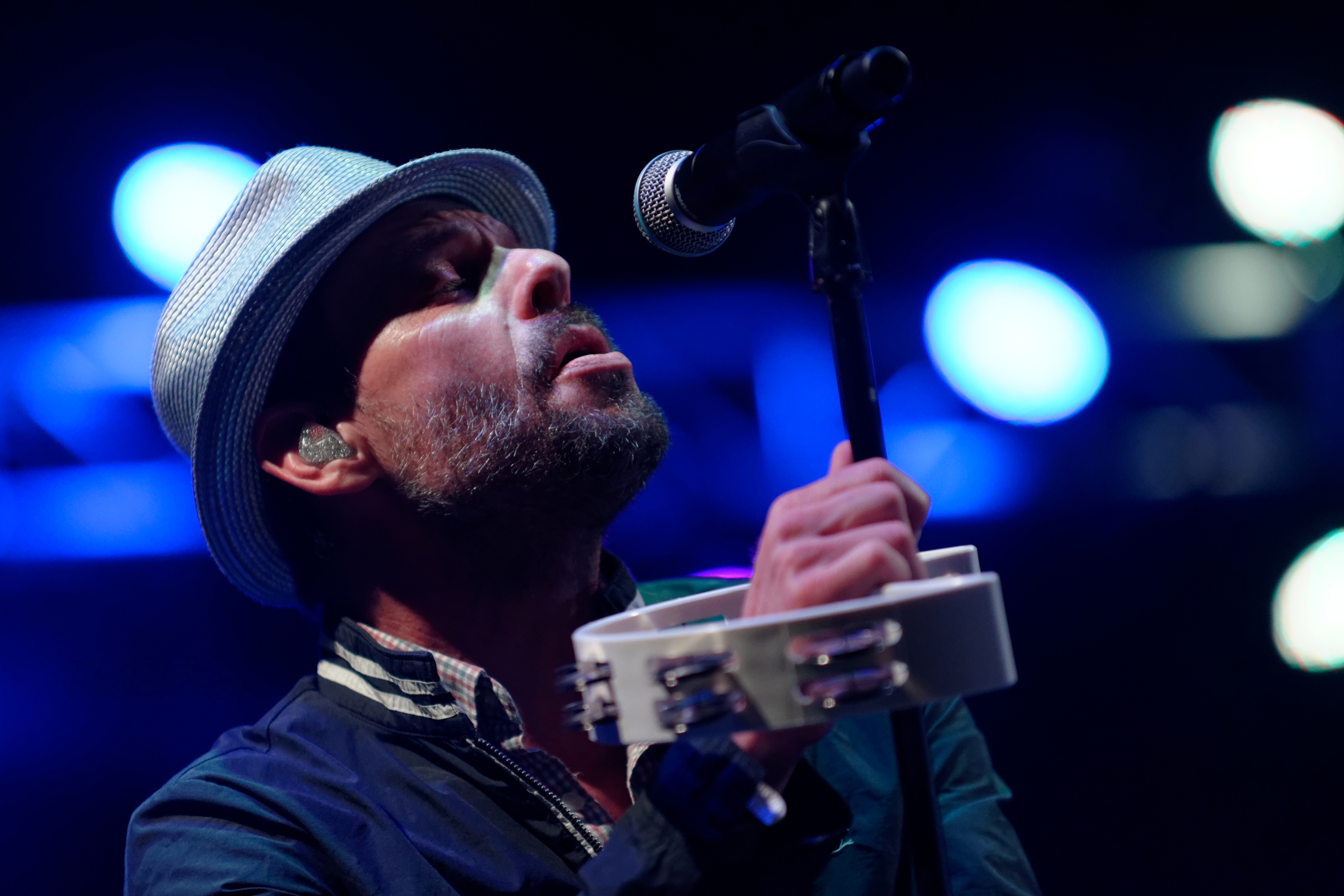
Lead singer Robin Wilson

=== Reunion ===
Gin Blossoms reunited in 2001. In Wilson's words, "We always said our breakup wasn't forever and right now we're all feeling like we want to be Gin Blossoms again. We make a noise together that we can't make otherwise. We respect and appreciate that we need each other to create that sound. This time we hope to avoid being swallowed by the chaos."

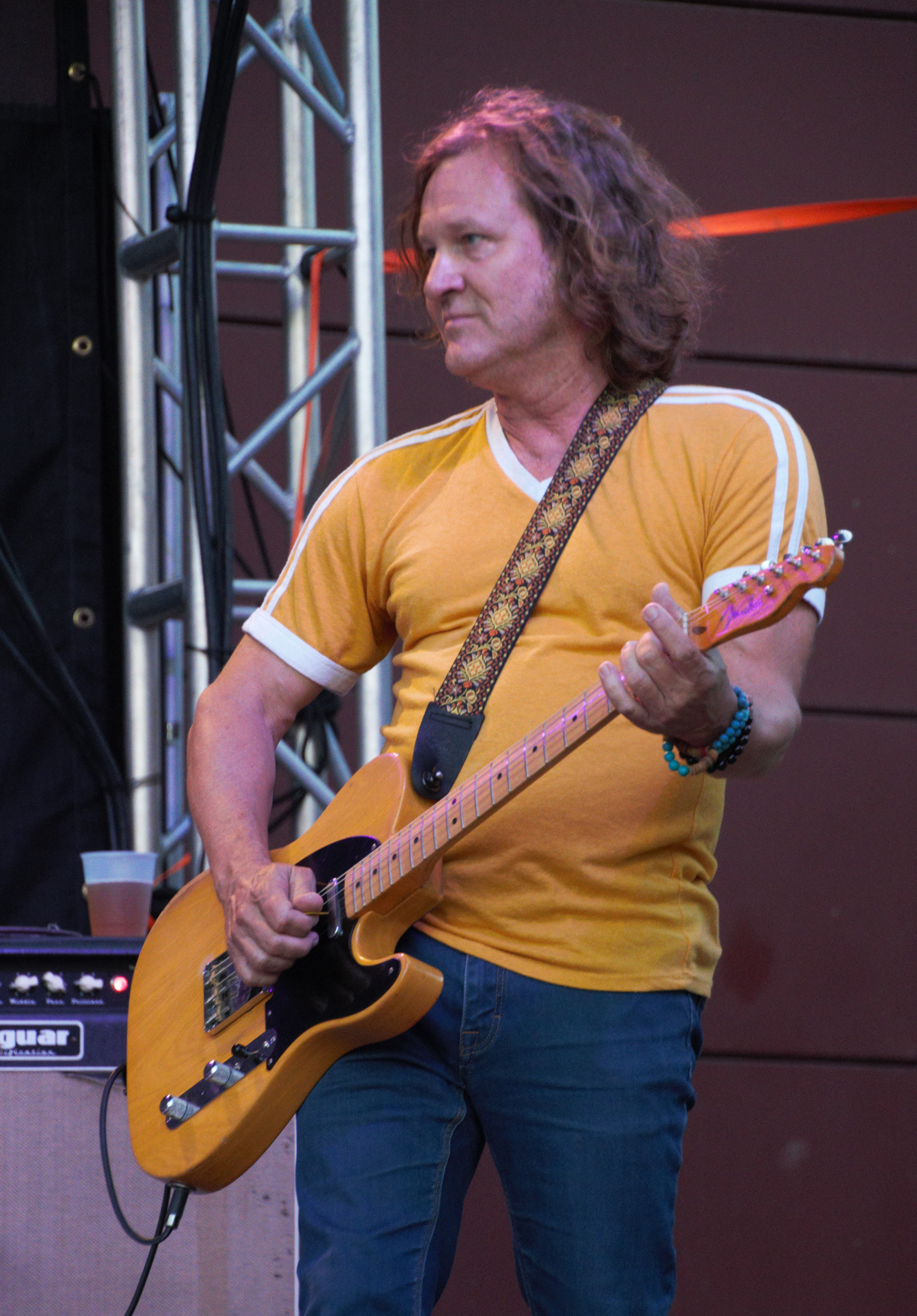
Lead guitarist Scotty Johnson

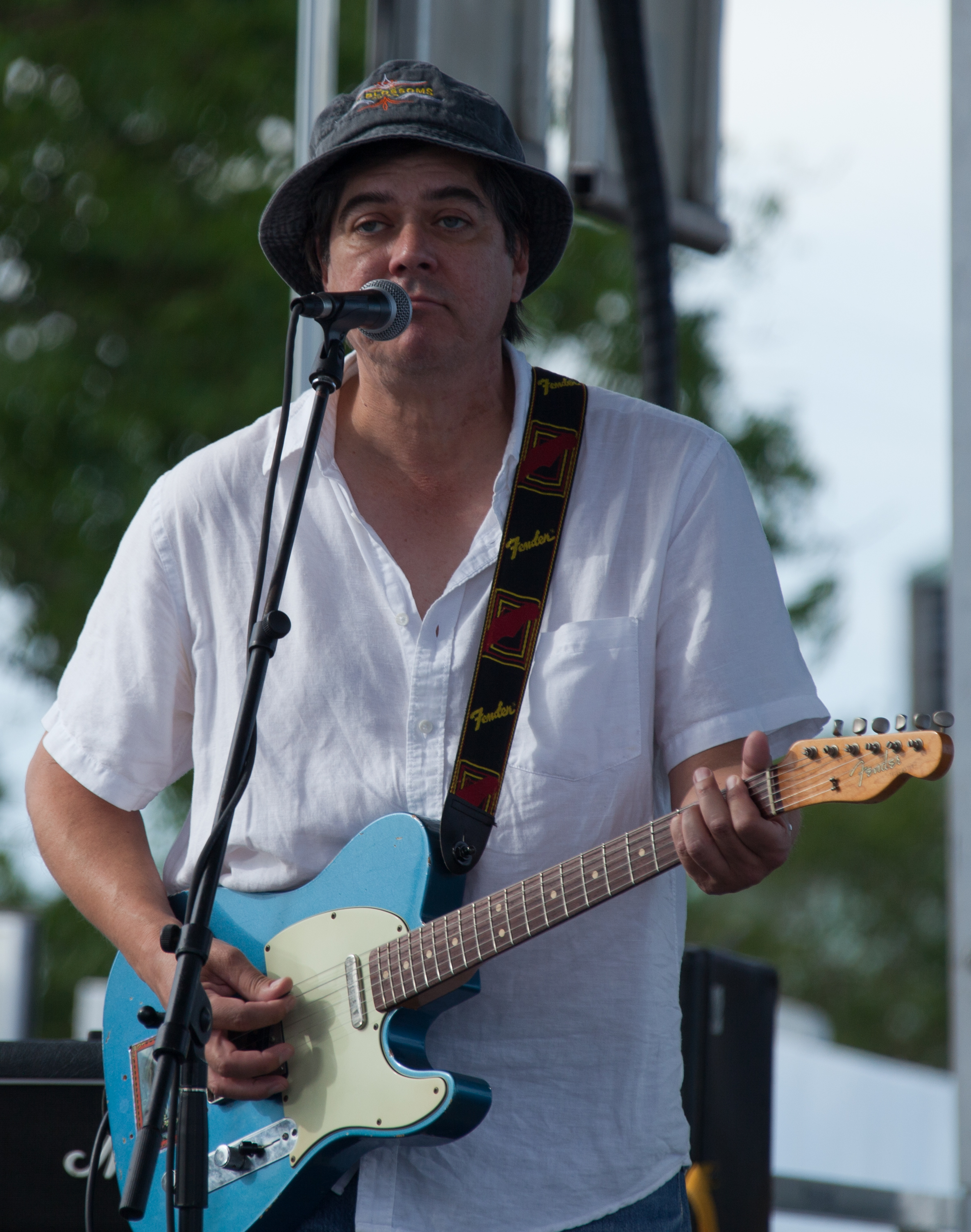
Rhythm guitarist Jesse Valenzuela

In preparation for the band's official reunion show, Rhodes suffered a breakdown due to his ongoing battle with alcohol. Shortly after entering rehab, he was formally dismissed from the band. Following the departure of Rhodes, the band went through several drummers.

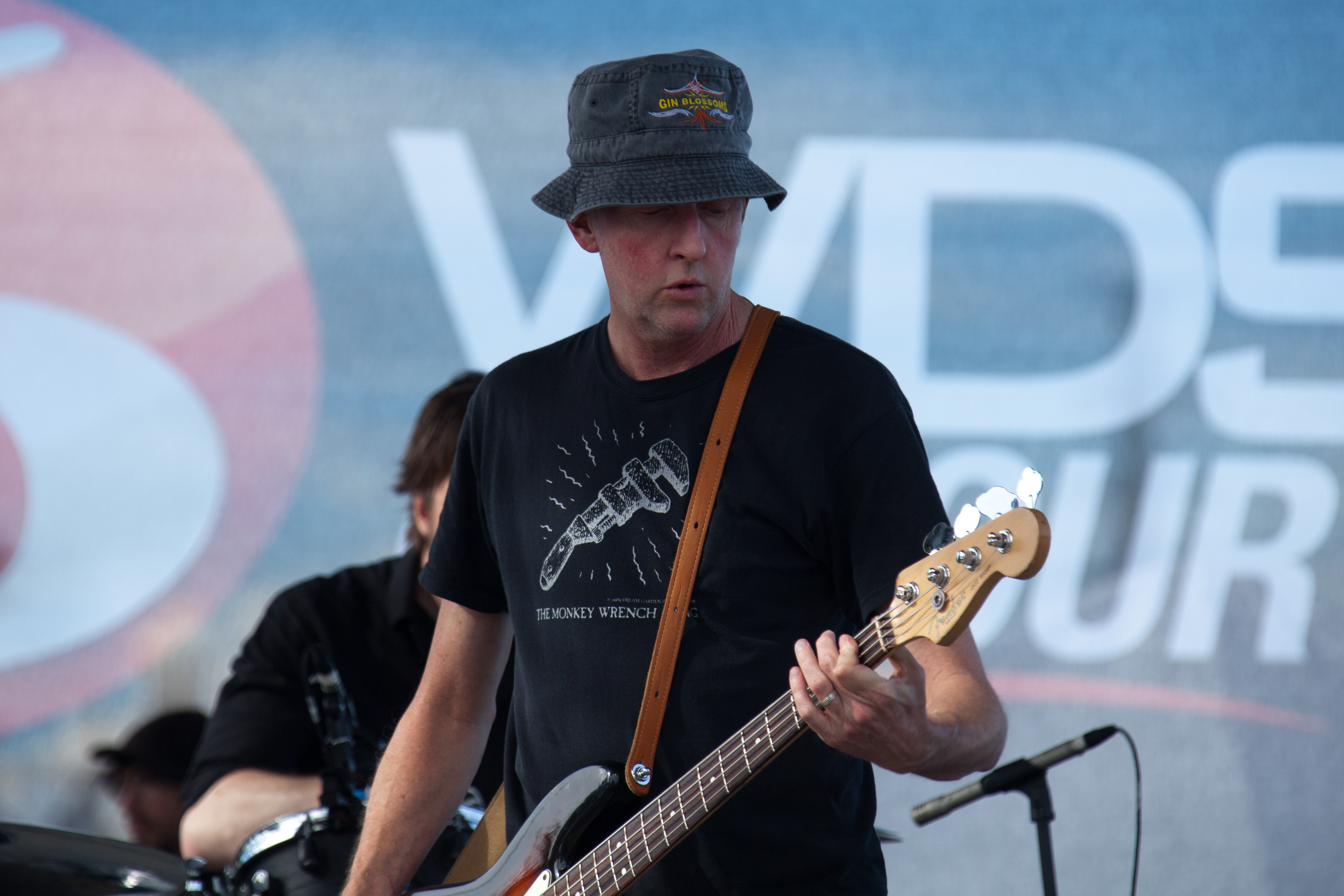
Bassist Bill Leen

The band's fourth album, Major Lodge Victory, was originally recorded at Wilson's Mayberry Studios in Tempe. However, the album was re-recorded at Ardent Studios in Memphis, where the band had recorded all of their previous albums. Major Lodge Victory was released by Hybrid Recordings on August 8, 2006, and "Learning the Hard Way" was the first single. Major Lodge Victory entered the Billboard 200 album chart at number 159.

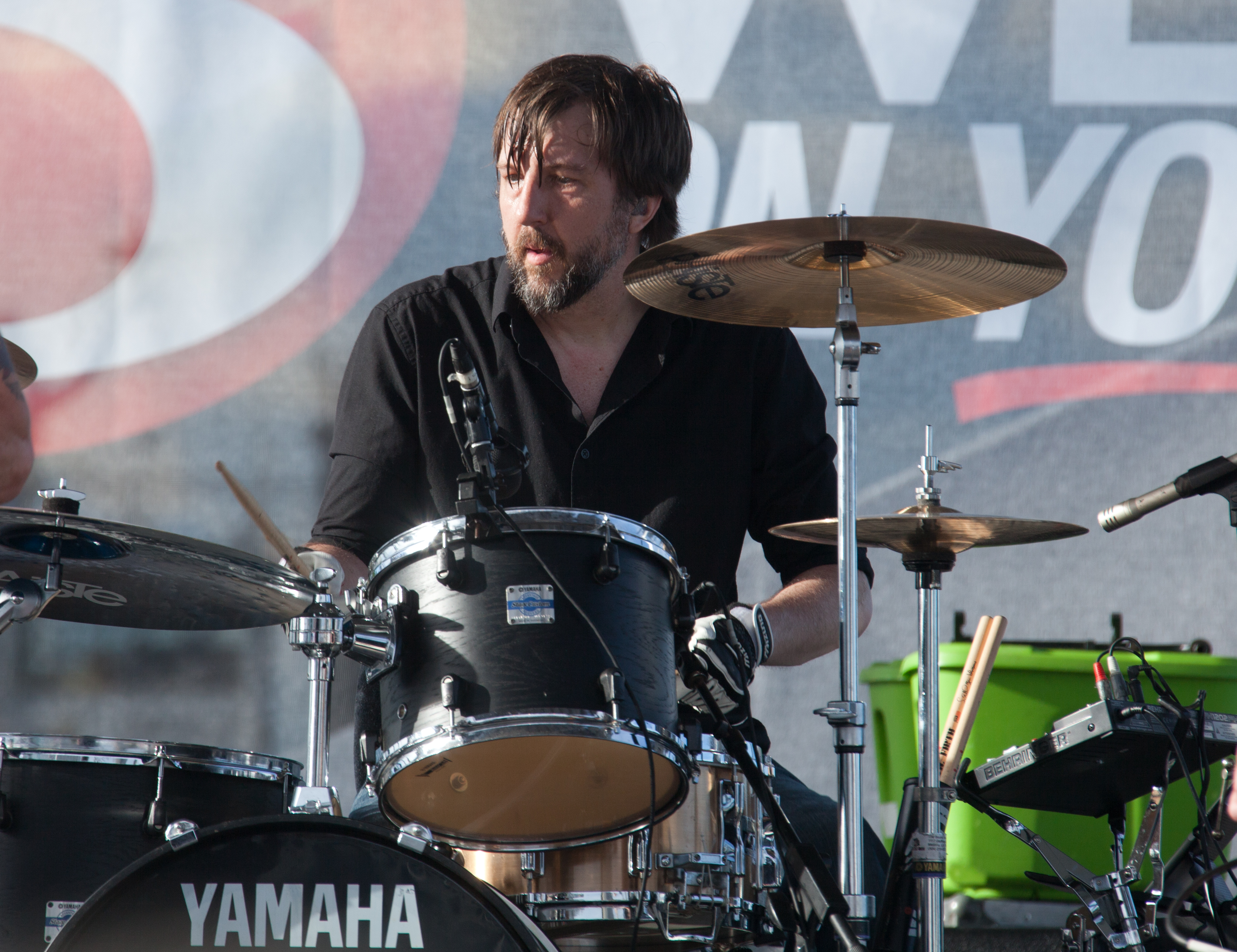
Drummer Scott Hessel

Gin Blossoms released a live album, Live In Concert, on May 15, 2009. This album contains live recordings of the band's hits such as "Hey Jealousy" and "Follow You Down", as well as more recent singles such as "Learning the Hard Way" and "Long Time Gone", and a live cover version of Elton John's "Rocket Man". The band's fifth studio album, No Chocolate Cake, was released on September 28, 2010. The first single, "Miss Disarray" was released to radio stations on August 2, 2010. Over the 2010 Thanksgiving holiday the band traveled to Iraq and played a series of shows for American troops stationed there.

Gin Blossoms joined Everclear, Sugar Ray, Lit, and Marcy Playground on the Summerland Tour 2012, a 31-date nationwide tour that began on June 28 in Saratoga, California and ended on August 11 in Laughlin, Nevada. In 2016, Johnson announced in an interview that the band was expected to begin recording its sixth studio album with producer Mitch Easter in the fall. Two years later, Mixed Reality was released on Cleopatra Records on June 15, 2018. In support of the album, the band toured in the summer of 2019 with Collective Soul.

In January 2022, Gin Blossoms announced a tour to celebrate the 30th anniversary of New Miserable Experience. The tour was cut short in March 2022 due to an accident in which bassist Bill Leen broke his arm.

Gin Blossoms will tour North America in the summer and fall of 2026 with Blues Traveler and Spin Doctors. The band members have confirmed that a follow-up to Mixed Reality is in the works.

== Musical style ==
Gin Blossoms have been described as an alternative rock, jangle pop, power pop, and post-grunge band. According to Rolling Stone, the band excels at "marrying world-weary lyrics with ebullient melodies." In 2017, the Salina Journal described Gin Blossoms as a "Tempe, Ariz.-based indie band [acclaimed] by critics and fans alike for its chiming guitars, introspective lyrics and catchy pop-rock melodies," adding that "Gin Blossoms has maintained its longevity by being mostly a road band."

== Band members ==
Current members

- Bill Leen – bass (1987–1997, 2001–present)
- Jesse Valenzuela – rhythm guitar, backing vocals (1988–1997, 2001–present); lead vocals (1987–1988)
- Robin Wilson – lead vocals; acoustic guitar, percussion, harmonica (1988–1997, 2001–present); rhythm guitar, backing vocals (1988)
- Scott "Scotty" Johnson – lead guitar, backing vocals (1992–1997, 2001–present)

Former members

- Doug Hopkins – lead guitar (1987–1992; died 1993)
- Richard Taylor – rhythm guitar, backing vocals (1987–1988)
- Chris McCann – drums, percussion (1987–1988)
- Steven Severson – rhythm guitar, backing vocals (1988)
- Dan Henzerling – drums, percussion (1988)
- Phillip "Phil" Rhodes – drums, percussion, backing vocals (1988–1997, 2001–2002, 2004–2005)
- Scott Kusmirek – drums, percussion (2002–2004, 2005–2008) (Note: Kusmirek performed drums on all tracks of the 2006 album Major Lodge Victory except "California Sun", and was credited as a session musician, while session musician Dorian Crozier performed drums on "California Sun". Kusmirek also performed drums on the track "Go Crybaby" from the 2010 album No Chocolate Cake, credited as an additional musician.)
- John Richardson – drums, percussion (2008–2012) (Note: Richardson performed drums on all tracks of the 2010 album No Chocolate Cake except "I'm Ready" and "Go Crybaby", and was credited as a session musician, while session musician Chase Duddy performed drums on "I'm Ready", and session musician Scott "Scotty" Kusmirek performed drums on "Go Crybaby".)
- Scott Hessel – drums, percussion (2012–2025)

Current and former touring musicians and substitutes

- Andy Herrin - drums (2024- Present)
- Phil Leavitt – drums, percussion (2002)
- Gary Smith – drums, percussion (2002)
- Douglas Swartz – drums (2012; substitute for Scott Hessel)
- Miles Zuniga – bass (2013; substitute for Bill Leen)
- Paul De Lisle – bass (2013; substitute for Bill Leen)
- Chris Serafini – bass (2013; substitute for Bill Leen)
- Donovan White – rhythm guitar, backing vocals (2018, 2023; substitute for Jesse Valenzuela); lead guitar, backing vocals (2018, 2020; substitute for Scotty Johnson); bass (2022; substitute for Bill Leen)

Touring guests

- Kirk "The Judge" Karman – harmonica (2002–present)
- Michael Klooster – keyboards (2013)
- Sean Hurwitz – guitar (2013)
- Grey Wilson – acoustic guitar (2017)

Session musicians

- Dorian Crozier – drums on "California Sun" from Major Lodge Victory (2006)
- Darryl Icard – bass on "I'm Ready" from No Chocolate Cake (2010)
- Chase Duddy – drums on "I'm Ready" from No Chocolate Cake (2010)

== Discography ==
- Dusted (1989)
- New Miserable Experience (1992)
- Congratulations I'm Sorry (1996)
- Major Lodge Victory (2006)
- No Chocolate Cake (2010)
- Mixed Reality (2018)
