= Robin Wilson (musician) =

American musician (born 1965)

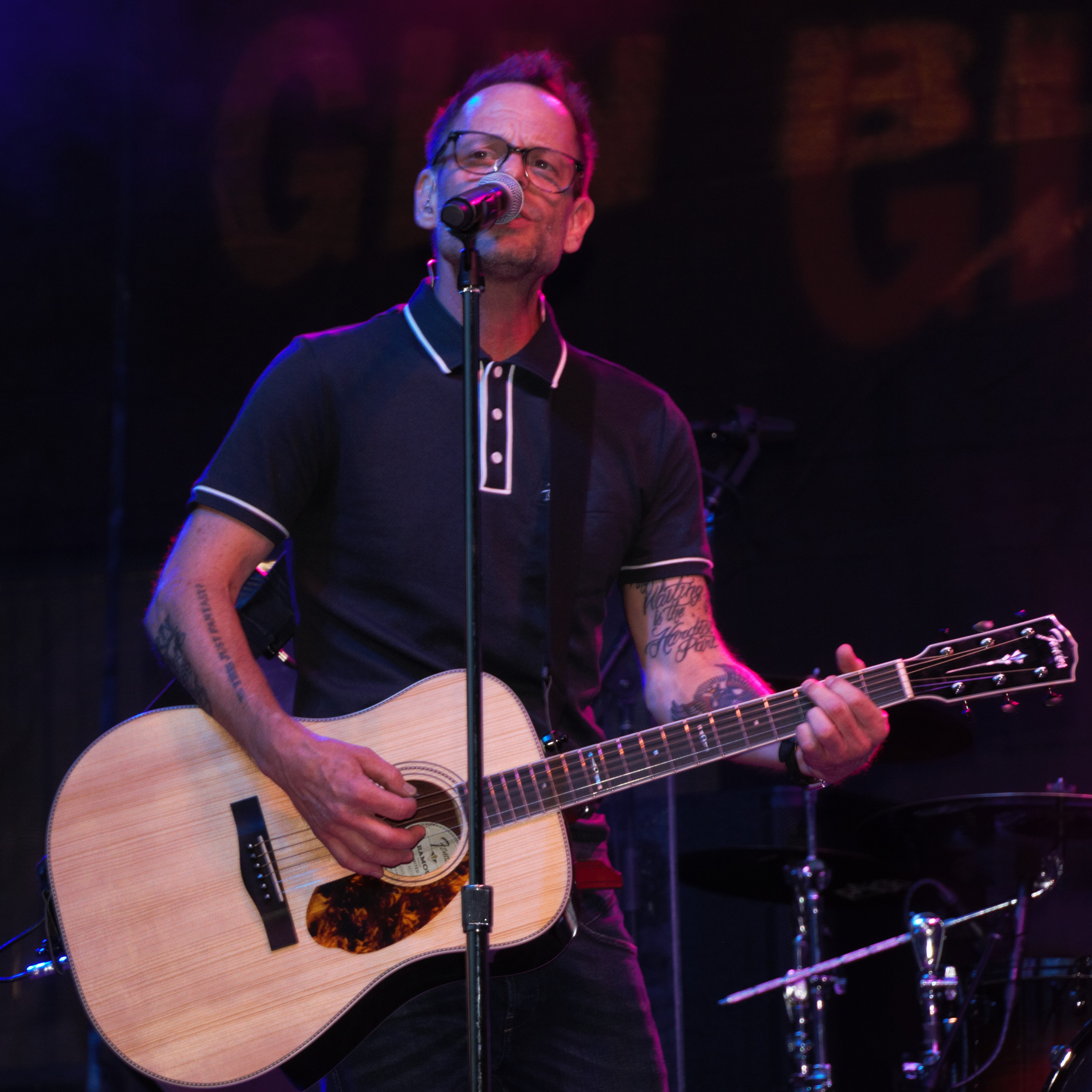
- Wilson in 2018

Background information
- Born: July 12, 1965 (age 60); Detroit, Michigan, U.S.
- Genres: Alternative rock; jangle pop; power pop
- Occupations: Musician, producer
- Instruments: Vocals, guitar
- Years active: 1988–present
- Member of: Gin Blossoms, Gas Giants

Robin Wilson (born July 12, 1965) is an American musician most notable for his work as the lead vocalist of the alternative rock band Gin Blossoms.

== Career ==
Wilson replaced Richard Taylor as guitarist of Gin Blossoms in 1988, but switched places early on with vocalist Jesse Valenzuela. He remained a member of the band until its disbandment in 1997; prior to its split, the band released two albums. Its hit second album, New Miserable Experience, was certified quadruple platinum and featured singles "Hey Jealousy", "Found Out About You", "Mrs. Rita", "Until I Fall Away", and Wilson's "Allison Road". The band's next album, Congratulations I'm Sorry, which sold platinum, featured singles such as "Follow You Down", "As Long as It Matters", "Not Only Numb", and "Day Job", as well as Wilson's "Highwire".

After the breakup of Gin Blossoms, Wilson was the lead vocalist and songwriter for the band Gas Giants, which also included guitarist Dan Henzerling and former Gin Blossoms drummer Phil Rhodes. He also contributed vocals for The Longshadows album Simple Minded Way.

In 1995, Robin Wilson had an idea for an animated TV series called The Poppin' Wheelies: a teenage rock & roll band with a magical guitar travels through outer space while being chased by an evil witch's minion new wave band, the Techno-pops, who try to retrieve the enchanted instrument. While the animated series was worked on, it was never released. The supporting music for the series was released in November 2000 in an album of the same name, "The Poppin' Wheelies".

When the Gin Blossoms reunited in 2002, Wilson began touring with the band as well as recording the album Major Lodge Victory. Released on August 8, 2006, the album featured the singles "Learning the Hard Way" and "Long Time Gone".

Wilson ran his own studio, Uranus Recording in Tempe, Arizona, which he opened in 1994 until its closing in 2015.

Wilson has served as an occasional lead singer for The Smithereens since the 2017 death of lead singer Pat DiNizio.

== Personal life ==
Wilson grew up in Tempe, Arizona. Wilson graduated from McClintock High School in Tempe, Arizona. He attended Mesa Community College, where his father was a professor, from 1983 to 1988, majoring in planetary science, although he did not graduate. He is divorced from Gena Rositano who is the stage manager for SNL and they have two children. He currently lives on Long Island, New York.
