= John Hampton (music producer) =

American music engineer and producer

John Hampton (c. 1953 – December 12, 2014) was an American Grammy Award winning music engineer and music producer.

== Grammy Awards ==
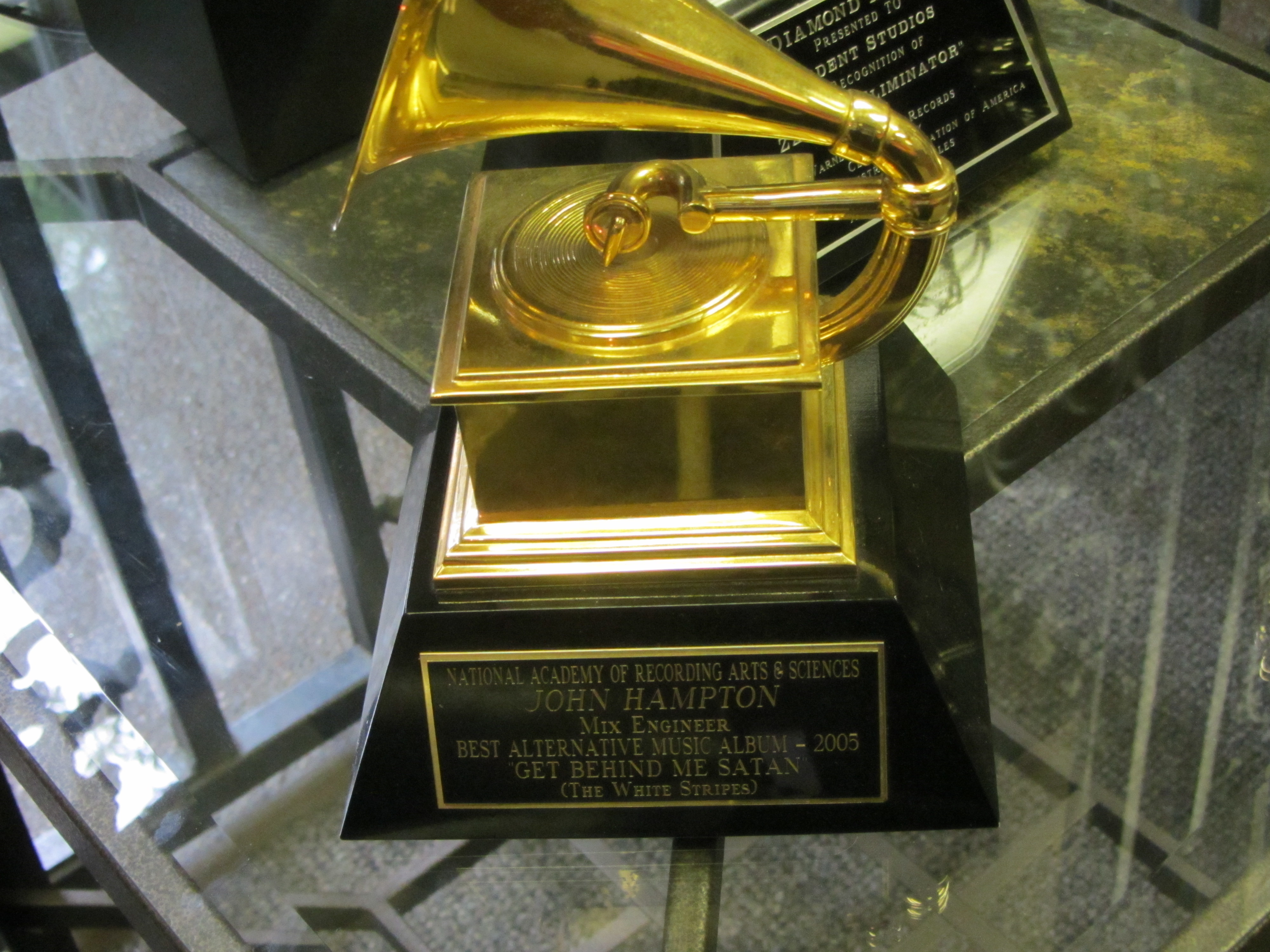
Hampton's 2005 Grammy for mixing Get Behind Me Satan

| Year | Award | Work | Artist | Details | Result |
|---|---|---|---|---|---|
| 2001 | Best Traditional Blues Album | Do You Get the Blues? | Jimmie Vaughan | Engineer | Won |
| 2005 | Best Alternative Music Album | Get Behind Me Satan | The White Stripes | Mix engineer | Won |

== Other notable credits ==
| Year | Artist | Album | Details |
|---|---|---|---|
| 1987 | The Replacements | Pleased to Meet Me | Engineer |
| 1992 | Gin Blossoms | New Miserable Experience | Producer |
| 2006 | The Raconteurs | Broken Boy Soldiers | Mix Engineer |
| 2005 | Under The Blue | Under The Blue | Producer |
