= List of Arizona State University alumni in arts and media =

Arizona State University (ASU) has graduated a number of notable people in the arts and media, including the fields of architecture; photography; entertainment; journalism; literature; and music. This includes graduates and non-graduate former students who are notable for their achievements within arts and media, sometimes before or after their time at ASU. Other alumni can be found in the list of Arizona State University alumni and its partial lists.

== Arts ==
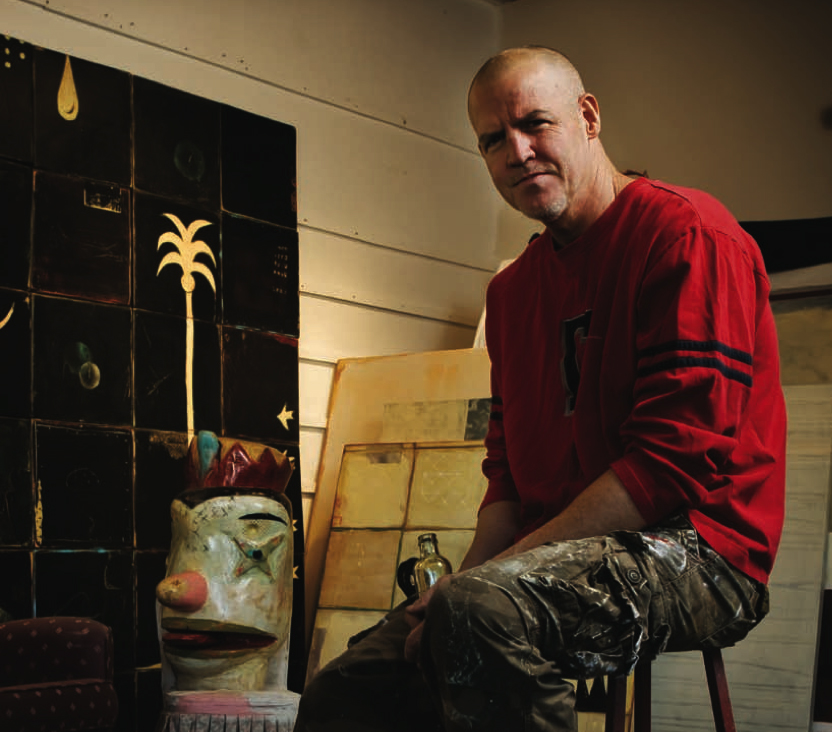
John Randall Nelson

Arts
Name	Class year	Notes	Ref.
Alvin Eli Amason	(MFA)	Painter and sculptor	
Loren Aragon	2004	Native American fashion designer	
Frank Austin	—N/a	Navajo designer and textile painter (attended)	
Fereydoun Ave		Iranian multimedia artist	
Frances Bagley	1969	Sculptor	
Stanley Battese	1961	Navajo painter and printmaker	
D.Y. Begay		Navajo weaver	
Tony Carrillo	2004	Author of syndicated comic strip F Minus	
Steve Crompton	—N/a	Artist for role-playing games (attended)	
Jerry Dumas	1955	Comics writer and artist of Sam's Strip and Sam and Silo	
Ka Graves	1974	Mixed media artist	
Molly Idle		Children's book illustrator	
Sonya Kelliher-Combs	1998 (MFA)	Native American artist	
David T. Kessler	1972	Photorealist painter	
Dan Lam	(MFA)	Drip artist	
Kim Leutwyler	2007	Australia-based artist	
Muriel Magenta	(MFA, PhD)	Environmental sculptor and video artist; professor of art at ASU	
Cristóbal Martínez		Artist and educator	
Mario Martinez	1979	Pascua Yaqui painter	
Rebecca Medel		Fiber artist	
Shari Mendelson		Sculptor	
John Randall Nelson	(MFA)	Sculptor and painter	
Sono Osato	1983	Artist	
Camille Patha	—N/a	Artist (attended)	
Matt Paweski		Sculptor	
Gorjana Reidel	1996	Jewelry designer	
Holly Roberts	1981 (MFA)	Artist	
M. Jenea Sanchez	2011 (MFA)	Artist	
Marilou Schultz		Navajo weaver	
Ryan Singer		Navajo painter	
Jeffrey Sippel	1980	Printmaker	
George Stillman	1968	Painter, printmaker, photographer	
Barbara Teller Ornelas		Navajo weaver	
Gary Tillery	1972	Sculptor and biographer	
Agnese Udinotti	1962	Sculptor and poet	
Patty Wickman	1981	Contemporary artist	
Margaret Wood	1971	Fiber artist and fashion designer	
Suzan Woodruff	—N/a	Abstract painter (attended)	
Melanie Yazzie	1990	Printmaker and professor of printmaking at the University of Colorado Boulder	
Steven Yazzie	2014	Native American artist	

=== Architects ===
Architects
Name	Class year	Notes	Ref.
Hagy Belzberg		Architect	
Tammy Eagle Bull		First Native American woman to become a licensed architect	
Bennie Gonzales	1953	Architect	
Wilbur R. Ingalls Jr.	—N/a	Architect (attended)	
Keith Kaseman	1995	Designer of the National 9/11 Pentagon Memorial	
Robert Harvey Oshatz	1968	Architect	
Michaele Pride-Wells	1981	Architect	
Bart Prince	1970	Architect	
Hal Sadler	1952	Architect known for work in the San Diego area	
Steven J. Schloeder	1984	Architect known for designing churches	

=== Photographers ===
Photographers
Name	Class year	Notes	Ref.
Louis Carlos Bernal	1972 (MFA)	Photographer of Chicano culture	
Richard Bram		Street photographer	
Robert J. Hirsch	(MFA)	Photographer and writer of photography textbooks	
Mark Mabry	—N/a	Photographer (attended)	
Arati Kumar-Rao	(MEd)	Indian photographer	
Gage Skidmore		Photographer of public figures	
Lissa Wales		Photographer of drummers	
Jo Ann Walters		Photographer and professor of photography	

== Entertainment and media ==
Entertainment
Name	Class year	Notes	Ref.
Dustin Lee Abraham		Television producer	
Ludwig Ahgren	2017	Streamer	
Steve Allen	—N/a	Writer, comedian, musician (attended)	
Roger Allers		Film director and animator, co-director of The Lion King	
Atrioc	2013	Streamer	
Wes Bergmann		Reality show contestant	
Carolina Bermudez		Radio personality	
S. Torriano Berry		Film producer, writer and director	
Gabriele Bertaccini		Italian chef and television personality	
Rachel Campos-Duffy		Conservative TV personality	
Lynda Carter	—N/a	Miss World USA (1972), actress, singer, and star of the 1970s TV series Wonder Woman (attended)	
Oliver Cooper	—N/a	Actor (attended)	
Katie Daryl		TV host and producer	
Bridget Everett	1995	Actress, singer and comedian	
Susan Flannery		Actor	
David Ford		Actor	
Mat George	2017	Podcaster	
Hunter Gomez		Actor	
Dr. Jerry Graham		Professional wrestler	
Chad Hartman	1988	Sports talk show host	
Faith Hibbs-Clark		Acting coach and casting director	
Tyler Hoechlin	—N/a	Actor, baseball player (attended)	
Marilyn Kagan		Actor	
Jimmy Kimmel	—N/a	Actor, comedian, TV host (attended)	
Ladimir Kwiatkowski	1953	Entertainer, co-hosted The Wallace and Ladmo Show	
Ross LaManna	(MA)	Screenwriter and novelist	
Chris LaMont		Filmmaker and film professor	
Darian Lane		Film writer, director and producer	
Tiffany Lau	2020	Hong Kong actress	
Michael Longfellow	2016	Comedian	
Rick Loomis		Game designer	
James Lye	1993	Singaporean actor	
Beth Maitland	—N/a	Actor (attended)	
Helen K. Mason	1958	Founder of the Black Theater Troupe	
Beth May		Playwright, actress and podcast host	
Heather McNair		Actress and model	
Blythe Metz		Actress	
Max Miller		YouTuber	
Nick Nolte	—N/a	Actor (attended)	
Eric Norris		Race car driver and stuntman	
Jack Ong		Newspaper reporter, film marketer, author	
Michelle Randolph	2023	Actor	
Shanna Reed	—N/a	Actress and dancer (attended)	
Luther Reigns		Professional wrestler	
Rory Rosegarten	—N/a	Producer, writer, comedian (attended)	
Don Safran		Reporter	
Andrew Santino		Comedian	
Johnny Somali	2021	Streamer	
David Spade	1986	Comedian and actor	
Scott Steindorff		Television and film producer	
Brody Stevens		Comedian and actor; ASU baseball pitcher	
Brenda Strong	1982	Actor	
Brittani Louise Taylor	—N/a	Author, actress and content creator (attended)	
Eva Thomas		Filmmaker and writer	
Ross Thomas	—N/a	Actor, filmmaker (attended)	
Daniel Tibbets		Media executive	
Shayne Topp	2019	Actor, YouTuber	
Trainwreckstv	2014	Streamer	
Chad Troutwine		Film and television producer, entrepreneur	
Andrew Wantuck	2001	Producer and director	
Mark Wiens	2008	Travel blogger and content creator	
Thomas F. Wilson	—N/a	Actor, played Biff Tannen in Back to the Future (attended)	
Robert Z'Dar		Actor and film producer	
Maysoon Zayid	1996	Standup comedian	
Anthony E. Zuiker		Creator of CSI: Crime Scene Investigation	

== Journalism ==
Journalism
Name	Class year	Notes	Ref.
Bill Adair	1985	Founder of PolitiFact	
Becky Anderson	1994 (MMC)	Anchor for ITN, CNBC Europe, Bloomberg Television and CNN	
Matt Barrie	2001	Sportscaster for ESPN	
Frank Blethen		Publisher of The Seattle Times	
Samuel Burke	2009 (MMC)	Anchor for CNN	
Nicole Carroll	1991	Executive editor of The Arizona Republic and editor-in-chief of USA Today; executive director, Local Journalism Initiative, ASU Media Enterprise	
Julie Cart	1980	Journalist, winner of the 2009 Pulitzer Prize for Explanatory Reporting	
Estela Casas	—N/a	Television news anchor in El Paso, Texas (attended)	
Natasha Curry		Anchor for HLN	
Christine Devine	1987	Television news anchor in Los Angeles	
John Dougherty	1978	Investigative journalist and political candidate	
Dina Eastwood	—N/a	Television news anchor and actress (attended)	
Bob Fouracre	1962	Sportscaster	
Michael Grant	1973	Host of Horizon on KAET, ASU's TV station, 1981–2006	
Susan Hendricks		Anchor for HLN	
Vaughn Hillyard	2013	Reporter for NBC News and MSNBC	
Don Imus		Radio shock jock and host of Imus in the Morning	
Pedram Javaheri		Weather anchor for CNN International	
Kim Komando	1985	Radio personality	
Michael Lacey	—N/a	Founder of the Phoenix New Times (attended)	
Ian Lee	2007	London correspondent for CBS News, Peabody Award winner	
Marjorie Herrera Lewis		Sports journalist and novelist	
Emma Lockhart		TV news reporter	
James Loper	1953	Public TV executive at KAET and later KCET in Los Angeles	
Torey Malatia		Public radio executive	
Al Michaels	1966	Sportscaster	
Marilyn Mitzel		TV news reporter	
Bob Petty	1970	TV news reporter	
Mike Pomeranz		TV news and sports anchor	
Sarocha Pornudomsak		Thai TV journalist	
Ian Punnett	2017 (PhD)	Radio show host and journalism professor	
Michael Reghi	1979	Sportscaster	
Rick Reichmuth		Meteorologist	
Russ Rhea		Journalist	
Siera Santos		Sportscaster for MLB Network	
John Seibel	1997	Sportscaster	
Les Shapiro		Sportscaster	
Gina Silva		TV news anchor	
James Simon	1992 (MMC)	College dean	
Jodie Steck		Photojournalist and winner of the Pulitzer Prize	
Patty Talahongva		Native American multimedia journalist	
Mary Kim Titla	(MMC)	Native American reporter	

== Literature ==
Literature
Name	Class year	Notes	Ref.
Wendy Barker		Poet	
H. Lee Barnes	(MFA)		
Venita Blackburn	(MFA)	Author	
Amanda Brown	1993	Author of Legally Blonde	
Jaime Clarke	—N/a	Novelist (attended)	
Eduardo C. Corral		Poet and professor of English	
Chris Crowe	1980 (M.Ed)	Professor of English and novelist	
Oliver de la Paz	(MFA)	Poet	
Ed Dee	(MFA)	Author	
Stella Pope Duarte		Novelist	
Kristin Espinasse		Author	
Howard Falco		Self-help author and motivational speaker	
Matthew Gavin Frank	(MFA)	Nonfiction writer and poet	
Kate Gale		Author, publisher of Red Hen Press	
Carrie Gerlach Cecil		Author of the novel Emily's Reasons Why Not, adapted into a TV series	
Rigoberto González	1997 (MFA)	Writer and book critic	
Amelia Gray	2004	Novelist	
William Greenleaf		Novelist	
Sue Hardesty		Novelist	
Zenna Henderson		Science fiction and fantasy author	
Shanna Hogan	2005	Journalist and author	
Trent Horn		Catholic apologist	
Allegra Hyde	2015 (MFA)	Author	
Patrick Jennings		Writer of children's books	
Charles Jensen	(MFA)	Poet	
Adam Johnson	1992	Author, won the Pulitzer Prize for Fiction for The Orphan Master's Son	
Tayari Jones	2000 (MFA)	Author, wrote An American Marriage	
Tania Katan		Self-help writer and public speaker	
Ruth Ellen Kocher	1994 (MFA)	Poet and professor of English	
Larry Kusche		Author and research librarian	
J. S. Lewis		Writer of children's books	
Kasma Loha-unchit		Thai-American food writer and teacher	
Janet Nichols Lynch	(MM)	Author of young adult fiction	
Michael McCollum		Science fiction author	
T. M. McNally	(MFA)	Novelist and short story writer, professor of English at ASU	
Sheila Murphy	(PhD)	Poet	
Bonnie Nadzam	2004 (MFA)	Writer	
Clyde M. Narramore		Self-help author and Christian counselor	
Dianne Nelson	(MFA)	Short story writer	
Laurie Notaro		Writer, newspaper reporter	
Carol O'Connell		Author of crime fiction	
Paul Perry		Author and documentary filmmaker	
m.s. RedCherries	2017 (JD)	Native American poet	
Iliana Rocha	(MFA)	Poet and professor of creative writing	
Eric Rohmann	(MFA)	Children's book author and illustrator	
Peng Shepherd		Novelist	
Michelle Cruz Skinner	(MFA)	Filipina American fiction writer	
Agnes Smedley	—N/a	Writer and activist (attended)	
Brandon Som		Winner of the Pulitzer Prize for Poetry	
Stephen Tall		Science fiction writer	
Fargo Tbakhi	2019	Poet	
Marshall Trimble	1961	Writer, Arizona official state historian	
Rishi Vohra		Author	

== Music ==
Music
Name	Class year	Notes	Ref.
Jeffrey Anderson	(MM)	Principal tuba player for the San Francisco Symphony	
Eric Anzalone	2012	Member of the Village People, 1995–2017	
Carolyn Waters Broe	(PhD)	Conductor and violist	
Angela Brower	2006	Mezzo soprano	
Joe Burgstaller	1993	Trumpet soloist	
Roger Clyne	1993	Lead singer and songwriter for The Refreshments and Roger Clyne and The Peacemakers	
Samara Cyn	2021	Rapper	
Craig Dahn		Concert pianist	
Brent Michael Davids	1992 (MM)	Composer and flautist	
Michelle Di Russo	(DMA)	Conductor	
Art Edwards	1993	Bassist for The Refreshments; novelist	
Domo Genesis	—N/a	Rapper, songwriter, and DJ; member of Odd Future (attended)	
Lauren Hildebrandt	—N/a	Singer (attended)	
Doug Hopkins		Founder and lead guitarist of The Gin Blossoms	
Kongos	—N/a	Alternative rock band composed of four brothers, all of whom graduated from ASU	
Scott MacIntyre		Singer	
Matt Maher		Christian musician	
Carolyne Mas	2019	Singer	
Jonathan Monro		Pianist	
Paul Naffah		Drummer for The Refreshments and Roger Clyne and The Peacemakers	
Richard Nance	(DMA)	Choral conductor and music professor	
Ted Newman		Football player at ASU and singer	
Ann-Helena Schlüter	(MM)	Concert pianist	
Brinton Averil Smith		Cellist and professor of cello; earned a BA in mathematics at 17	
Z. Randall Stroope	1987 (DMA)	Composer and conductor	
Fee Waybill	—N/a	Lead singer of The Tubes (attended)	
Christine Weidinger		Operatic soprano	
Guy Whatley	2005 (DMA)	Organist and harpsichordist	
Christine Yoshikawa	(DMA)	Classical pianist	
Bill Zorn	—N/a	Singer and banjo player (attended)	
