= David Kessler =

David Kessler may refer to:

- David Kessler (actor) (1860–1920), Yiddish theater
- David A. Kessler (born 1951), FDA Commissioner, university medical dean
- David R. Kessler (born 1957), Pennsylvania state representative, elected 2006
- David Kessler (author) (born 1957), English thriller writer
- David Kessler (writer) (born 1959), death and grieving expert
- David F. Kessler (1906–1999), managing director of The Jewish Chronicle
- David T. Kessler (born 1950), American artist
- David Kessler, character in An American Werewolf in London
