= Allison Road (song) =

1994 single by Gin Blossoms

Single by Gin Blossoms

from the album New Miserable Experience
- Released: 1991 (original release); 1994 (re-release)
- Genre: Alternative rock; jangle rock; power pop
- Length: 3:19
- Label: A&M
- Songwriter: Robin Wilson

Gin Blossoms singles chronology
"Found Out About You" (1994)	"Allison Road" (1991)	"Til I Hear It from You" (1995)

"Allison Road" is a song by the American alternative rock band Gin Blossoms, first released on their 1991 EP Up and Crumbling and subsequently on their 1992 album New Miserable Experience.

== Background ==
In 1989, Robin Wilson passed by a sign on his way to El Paso that read "Next Exit Allison Road." The friend with whom he was riding had a sister named Allison, and so they stopped to take a picture. Five months later, Wilson had the picture and was bored. In a Billboard interview from 1994, he recalled:

I walked to the other room, sat down in front of the television and turned on CNN. And the moment the TV turned on I heard that little melody in my head; 'On Allison Road.' And I was like, 'Shit!' So I turned off the TV, climbed over the couch and went back in my bedroom and the song was pretty much done 20 minutes later.

The exit sign for Allison Road is located on Interstate 10 in Roosevelt, Texas.

At this point in the band's history, Wilson had struggled in convincing his bandmates to record the songs he had written: in particular, guitarist Doug Hopkins would often refuse to rehearse Wilson's tracks or help him finish songs. However, "Allison Road" had impressed his bandmates sufficiently to earn a place on the band's album. Wilson recalled, "When I came in with 'Allison Road,' it was hard for everybody, even Doug, to deny that I had a significant contribution to make to the songs."

== Release ==
"Allison Road" was initially released as a promotional single in 1991 to support the band's major label debut (the Up and Crumbling EP). After "Allison Road" was included on the band's follow-up album New Miserable Experience, it was again released as a single. It became a moderate hit, charting on the Airplay charts in the US as well as reaching number 21 in Canada.

== Critical reception ==
"Allison Road" saw praise from music critics. Ed Masley of The Arizona Republic listed the song as the Gin Blossom's ninth best song on his list of the band's top 30 tracks, dubbing the song a "jangle-rocking gem."

== Charts ==
Chart (1994)	Peak position
Canada Top Singles (RPM)	21
US Adult Contemporary (Billboard)	31
US Adult Pop Airplay (Billboard)	38
US Alternative Airplay (Billboard)	39
US Mainstream Rock (Billboard)	20
US Pop Airplay (Billboard)	11
