= Tony Carrillo =

Tony Carrillo may refer to:

- Tony Carrillo (politician) (1936–2020), American politician and educator
- Tony Carrillo (cartoonist), creator of F Minus, an offbeat comic strip
