= Battese =

Battese is a surname. Notable people with the surname include:

- Brian Battese (born 1961), Australian rugby league footballer
- Stanley Battese (born 1936), Navajo-American painter and printmaker
