= The State Press =

Student newspaper at Arizona State University

- Type: Student newspaper
- Format: Compact
- Owner: Arizona State University
- Founded: 1906
- Headquarters: Matthews Center; Arizona State University; Tempe, AZ 85281; United States
- Circulation: 13,500 Daily
- Website: statepress.com

The State Press is the independent, student-operated news publication of Arizona State University. In August 2014, it became an all-digital publication. It published a free newspaper every weekday until January 2013, at which point its print distribution was reduced to once per week. The editorial board announced that ASU Student Media will begin to focus on "a host of new digital products and special print products."

== History ==
The history of The State Press goes back to ASU's establishment as a "Normal School" during Arizona's territorial period. The university's first student newspaper, The Normal Echo, made its debut on October 18, 1890. Back then, it was a one-page supplement to the local newspaper now called the East Valley Tribune.

The existence of The State Press as an independent entity began in 1906, when it became the Tempe Normal Student, a four-page tabloid distributed on campus each Friday for five cents per copy. The paper changed its name to Tempe Collegian in 1925 when the school's name changed to Tempe College in the same year. The name was eventually shortened to the Collegian in 1930 and fell under the control of the newly created Faculty of Journalism two years later.

The newspaper was renamed the Arizona State Press in 1936, and the name was shortened to State Press the next year. (The word "The" was added to the masthead in the early 2000s.)

In the 1970s, The State Press regained its independence from what is now the Walter Cronkite School of Journalism and Mass Communication. Initially, the president of ASU at the time, John Schwada, placed the paper under the authority of a Board of Student Media. The first board resigned within a month because of a disagreement with the Arizona Board of Regents regarding its role in the newspaper's affairs. The department is now under the Office of Vice President for University Student Initiatives and maintains a significant amount of independence from the school; although ASU provides equipment and offices on campus, The State Press pays production costs and salaries through advertising revenue. Decisions on editorial content are left to the paper's editorial board; the full-time director of ASU Student Media plays a purely advisory role.

On September 10, 1984, the paper added a Monday edition and began to operate as a five-days-a-week daily publication.

In 2008, the newspaper opened a second newsroom on ASU's Downtown Phoenix campus, in the newly constructed Cronkite/Eight Building. Many reporters and a handful of editors work from the downtown newsroom, while the balance of the newsroom staff – as well as the advertising, production and administrative staffs – work from ASU Student Media's headquarters in Matthews Center on the Tempe campus.

In the spring semester of 2013, The State Press went from being a five-day-a-week publication to a weekly, ending a 28-year run as a student daily. This came alongside an effort to boost the paper's online presence. The paper was also delivered to dorms each Thursday. In fall 2014, The State Press became the first major student university newspaper to go all-digital.

A separate staff produces State Press Magazine, which had been printed on the backside of the daily newspaper until August 2007, when it became a separate publication. In 2009, SPM became an online-only magazine, publishing daily stories and blogs that examined university issues such as current events, arts and entertainment. In spring 2011, SPM began releasing a stand-alone print issue once per semester, in addition to its daily online publication. Starting in fall of 2012, it began releasing two issues a semester. SPM continued releasing print issues with a smaller circulation as The State Press went entirely online.

In December 2021, State Press Magazine published its first Spanish issue under the leadership of magazine editor-in-chief Itzia Crespo. "La Edición de Etimología" featured stories centered on the Hispanic American community of ASU. SPM now publishes one Spanish issue at the end of each semester, for a total of four print issues a semester.

== Alumni ==
The paper's most famous ex-employee is former Monday Night Football sportscaster and ASU alumnus Al Michaels, who covered football and basketball as the paper's assistant sports editor in the fall of 1963 and became sports editor in 1964. Michaels is rumored to have been fired for reasons unknown.

Cartoonist Tony Carrillo began drawing his F Minus comic strip for The State Press while he was a student at ASU. The single-panel comic initially ran in The State Press for four semesters and is now syndicated, appearing in more than 100 newspapers – including The State Press. Carrillo also painted the city skyline mural in the underground window well in The State Press' Tempe newsroom.

Other notable State Pressers include:

- Jerry Dumas, a comic strip writer and artist
- Kris Mayes, the Arizona Attorney General and a former chair of the Arizona Corporation Commission
- Len Munsil, who ran for governor of Arizona in 2006.

== Layout ==
From January 2013 until August 2014, The State Press published newspapers every Thursday of the semester and features student articles, world and national wire reports, editorials, opinions, and comics, both student-drawn and syndicated.

On Tuesdays, a campus-specific front page had been produced and printed on the 500 copies of the newspaper delivered to ASU's West campus. A similar campus-specific edition was produced for the Polytechnic campus on Thursdays. Both zoned editions were launched in the fall of 2008 but suspended in February 2009 due to both the cost of the endeavor and uncertainty about the future of both outlying campuses in light of state budget cuts.

In November 2011, the paper moved from a traditional broadsheet format to a tabloid/compact format. Design editor Taylor Lineberger led the redesign, along with editor-in-chief Nathan Meacham. A majority of the paper is now printed in color. "We decided the paper needed a more visually striking design – one that would be more appealing to our readership. The front page will now grab your attention in a way it never has before. The paper will be easier to flip through, read and digest between classes, or on your lunch break," the editorial board wrote in a Nov. 20 editorial. "The news cycle has changed and so have your reading habits. News hits your cellphone or laptop long before you have the chance to pick up The State Press on campus. That’s why we created a product that speaks more to the college experience – a product that ties traditional print news to new forms of digital media."

The paper's staff uses Macintosh computers. When the publication put out a paper product, pages were laid out in Adobe InDesign. Today The State Press uses Gryphon as its content management system.

From the late 1990s through May 2009, the online edition of the newspaper was the ASU Web Devil, which served as a portal to all Student Media Web sites. By June 2009, the other Student Media properties – Sun Devil Television and State Press Magazine – had launched their own Web sites hosted separately from the Web Devil, so the site was rebranded as StatePress.com, returning to the URL used for the site in the 1990s.

In addition, a spoof edition of the daily paper, The Stale Mess, was published at the end of each semester by the State Press staff. The Stale Mess stopped when the publication ended its print run.

== Clashes with administration ==
In 2003, a memorable Stale Mess spoof cover featured a simulated photo of ASU President Michael Crow passed out in a bathtub, with vomit on his shirt and a bottle of cheap vodka cradled on his arm. Crow later complained about the photo to The State Press editorial board.

In spring 2004, an article about alleged mistreatment of employees at ASU's Department of Residential Life was criticized as one-sided by the department.

State Press Magazine created a stir in fall 2004 by publishing a full-page cover photo of a woman's naked, pierced breast on its cover; the publication drew criticism from prominent conservatives and ASU boosters such as Ira Fulton, who felt the university's administration needed to have more oversight regarding editorial decisions. The incident may have led to efforts by the administration to shut down the paper.

The paper also won an award for the way it handled pressure from the administration concerning content in the wake of the SPM controversy.

== 2012 Plagiarism Scandal ==
On September 1, 2012, the paper's editorial board printed an apology to its readers after discovering that Raquel Velasco, who was writing on issues related to Tempe (home of the ASU Tempe Campus), plagiarized and/or used facts and quotes without proper attribution, from the Phoenix Business Journal, Arizona Republic, and KNXV-TV (locally known as ABC15), among other news organizations.

In addition, the paper's editorial board discovered that Velasco may have also concocted facts on at least one story.

The State Press Editorial Board said Velasco's stories were retracted, and Velasco's relationship to The State Press was terminated. Investigation to Velasco's previous articles are still under investigation. In its apology, the editorial board mentioned the Walter Cronkite School of Journalism and Mass Communication's efforts to teach students the virtues of ethics and aversion of plagiarism. The school itself also has a written policy that students involved in academic dishonesty, which includes plagiarism and fabrication, will, if found to have engaged in such behavior, will receive a grade of XE (failure through academic dishonesty), and expelled from the School, without the possibility of reinstatement.

Searches on The State Press's website reveal that Velasco contributed seven articles to the paper, of which four have been retracted by the paper itself.

== 2024 Generative AI Scandal ==
On April 22, 2024, the paper's editorial board issued a statement confirming that they had retracted 24 stories from the publication's website after each had been found to be at least partially written by a form of generative AI.

The retracted articles dated back from April to last September and included 13 weekly horoscopes, nine news articles about the university’s art scene and two editorials. The editorial board declined to name the student reporter responsible, but they are no longer on staff.

== Organization ==
The State Press operates under a departmental umbrella of ASU Student Media, which also features a multimedia department (statepress.com) and a magazine (State Press Magazine). Student Media organizations operate from a newsroom in the Memorial Union at ASU's Tempe campus and a newsroom in the Cronkite building at ASU's Downtown Phoenix campus that was opened in fall 2008. A student radio station (KASC) runs independently of Student Media through the Walter Cronkite School of Journalism and Mass Communication but is affiliated with ASU Student Media by name.
