= Up and Crumbling =

EP by Gin Blossoms
- Released: October 8, 1991
- Recorded: 1990–1991
- Genre: Power pop
- Length: 17:46
- Label: A&M
- Producer: Gin Blossoms

Gin Blossoms chronology
Dusted (1989)	Up and Crumbling (1991)	New Miserable Experience (1992)

Professional ratings
Review scores
Source	Rating
Allmusic	3/5 stars
The Rolling Stone Album Guide	3/5 stars

Up and Crumbling is an EP released by the American alternative rock band Gin Blossoms on October 8, 1991. It was released after the Gin Blossoms signed with A&M Records and, while attempting to create a full-length album, ran into a creative drought during the recording sessions. According to the band's official website, the band recorded Up and Crumbling "on their own in hopes of rekindling the spark from Dusted that had been missing from the recent recordings." "Allison Road" was released as a single to promote the EP.

The songs from this EP were remastered and included on the 2002 deluxe edition of the band's breakthrough album, New Miserable Experience.

== Track listing ==
1. "Mrs. Rita" (Jim Swafford, Jesse Valenzuela) – 4:25
2. "Allison Road" (Robin Wilson) – 3:18
3. "Angels Tonight" (Doug Hopkins) – 3:33
4. "Just South of Nowhere" (Valenzuela) – 3:26
5. "Keli Richards" (Hopkins, Bill Leen) – 3:04
