= F Minus =

Comic strip by Tony Carrillo

- Author: Tony Carrillo
- Website: http://www.fminus.net/
- Current status/schedule: running
- Launch date: 2003; 22 years ago
- Syndicate(s): United Features Syndicate
- Publisher: Andrews McMeel Publishing

F Minus is a horizontally oriented single panel comic strip by Tony Carrillo, started when he was a sophomore at Arizona State University. It ran daily in The State Press, an independent newspaper at ASU, from early 2003 until late 2004, when Carrillo graduated.

In an online mtvU strips contest with Scott Adams of Dilbert fame as member of the jury and with almost 200,000 people voting to find the best college comic strip, F Minus came in first place.

Having won a development deal with United Features Syndicate through the contest, syndication of F Minus (in daily newspapers) began in April 2006 and reached 70 United States newspapers within a year.

According to Tony Carrillo, most of the comics are about stupidity and losers. It does not feature any story lines and is often compared to one of his favorites, The Far Side by Gary Larson.

In 2007, F Minus was nominated in the 2007 Reuben Awards for Best Newspaper Panel but lost to Rhymes with Orange by Hilary B. Price.

The Phoenix New Times named F Minus as the best syndicated comic strip in its Best of Phoenix 2007 issue.

== Books ==
There are two collections of F Minus.

Title	Release date	Publisher	ISBN
F Minus	September 1, 2007	Andrews McMeel Publishing	ISBN 978-0-7407-6839-2
This Can't Be Legal: An F Minus Collection	March 17, 2009	Andrews McMeel Publishing	
