= Mauricio Toussaint =

Mauricio Toussaint is a contemporary artist of French and Mexican descent. Toussaint entered the Universidad Autonoma de Guadalajara to obtain a degree in architecture (he graduated in 1985 with a bachelor's degree). During this time, he was encouraged by a professor from the nearby Visual Arts Department to make art on his own. Invited to work at the open workshop at the Centro de Arte Moderno, he made prints from 1982 to 1983 and soon after, he embarked on a series of paintings. In the mid-1980s he was asked to collaborate as an assistant curator at the Instituto Cultural Cabañas—his career in architecture officially replaced with art.

For the next several years, his paintings and prints were dominated by representational subject matter, but by the 1990s his approach changed to more conceptual concerns. In 1995 Toussaint was awarded in two categories at the prestigious "Salon De Octubre": 1st award in painting and 2nd award in drawing. He later went to Miami, USA, and three years later to Phoenix, and later Tucson. He became a Dinnerware Art Gallery member from 2000 to 2004. Currently he lives in Guadalajara. Spending seasons in Tucson, Arizona, where he has his studio and shows his works regularly. He has had exhibits in several Mexican cities, Spain, France, Korea and the United States. In 2009 he became a US citizen.

He has used and experimented with encaustic painting with beeswax, natural pigments and oil colors, on amate paper or wooden panels.

2015 Toussaint venture in a new media; Photography. Experimenting with construction of torn apart photos, to create a dimensional addition to the images.

Toussaint's work in part of permanent collections at Tucson Museum of Art, Udinotti Museum of Figurative Art, Casa de la Cultura de Zapopan and Museo Raul Anguiano in Guadalajara, México.

== External links and references ==
- Artist's Website
- Mauricio Toussaint's Archival Digital Photography @ BodegaFotografica
- Artistas Plasticos en Jalisco, Tomo I by Carlos Navarro & Helia Garcia. Guadalajara, Jalisco, México 2008 (in Spanish)
- III Siglos de Pintura Jalisciense, Cámara de Comercio de Guadalajara by Guillermo Ramírez Godoy, Colonia y Siglo XX. Arturo Camacho Becerra, Siglo XIX. Guadalajara, Jalisco, México 1997 (in Spanish)
