= Shawn Patterson =

Shawn Patterson may refer to:

- Shawn Patterson (American football) (born 1964), American former professional football player
- Shawn Patterson (composer) (born 1965), American composer and songwriter
