= Udinotti Museum of Figurative Art =

Museum in Maricopa County, Arizona

Coordinates: 33.52354°N 111.94035°W

The Udinotti Museum of Figurative Art is a non-profit 501(c)3 museum located in Paradise Valley, Arizona. The museum was founded by sculptor, painter, printmaker, poet, and gallery owner Agnese Udinotti in 2007. The collection focuses on figurative art from 1500 BCE (Ancient Egyptian) to the present. 'The primary goal of the museum is to educate the public about the historical evolution and importance of figurative art." The museum is not open to the public for tours.

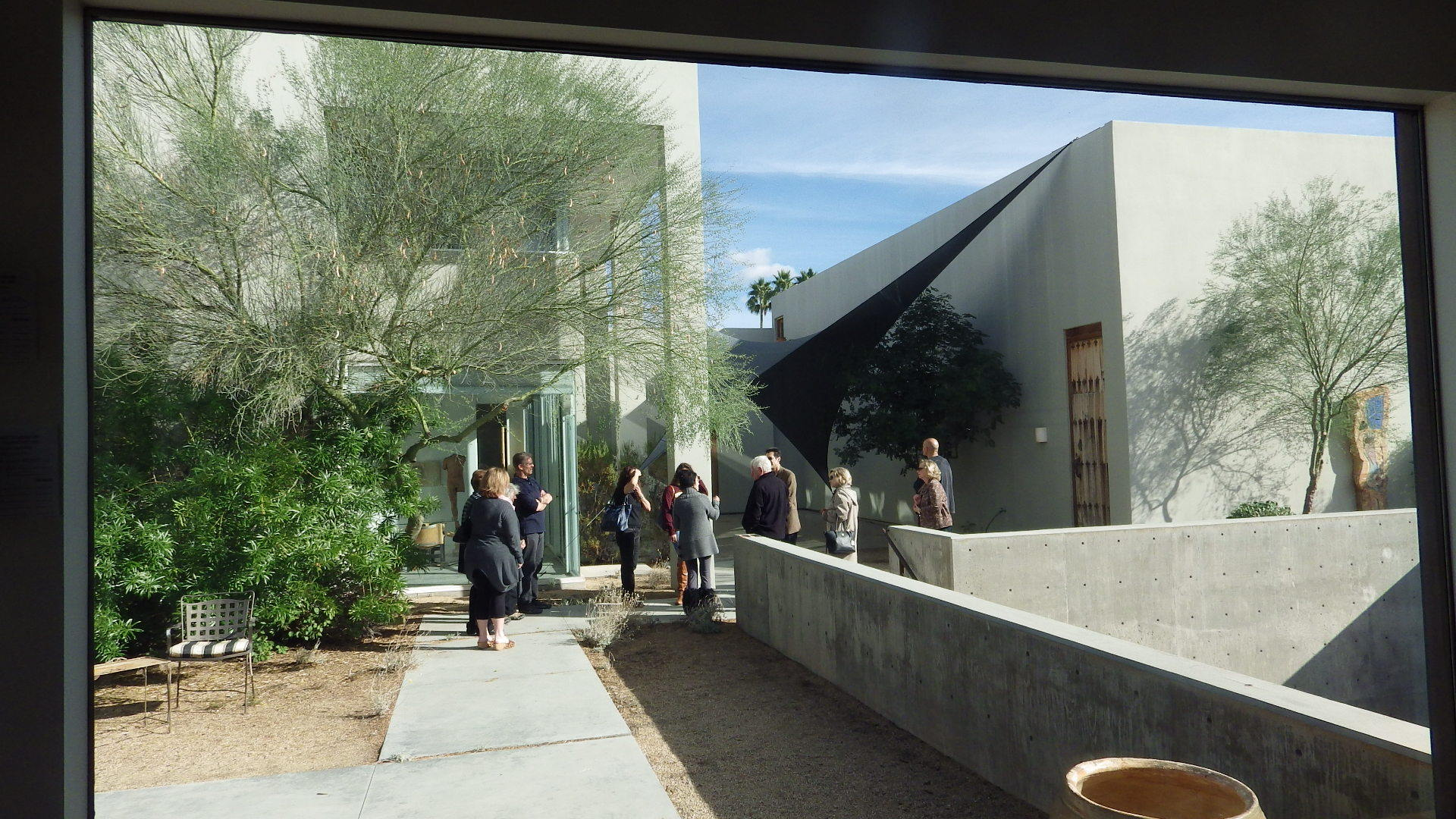

== Collection ==
The museum’s collection includes art by:

- Leonard Baskin
- Rafael Coronel
- Stephen De Staebler
- Franz Duckers
- Konishi Hirosada
- Don Reitz
- Mauricio Toussaint
- Utagawa Toyokuni
- Agnese Udinotti
