= Dusted (Gin Blossoms album) =

Studio album by Gin Blossoms
- Released: 1989
- Recorded: May − June 1989
- Studio: Whipping Post Studios in Tucson, Arizona
- Genre: Alternative rock
- Length: 36:07
- Label: San Jacinto
- Producer: Rich Hopkins

Gin Blossoms chronology
Dusted (1989)	Up and Crumbling (1991)

Professional ratings
Review scores
Source	Rating
(The New) Rolling Stone Album Guide	2/5 stars

Dusted is the debut album by the alternative rock band the Gin Blossoms. It was released through San Jacinto Records, a small independent label as a 12-song tape and record in 1989.

Seven of the songs on this album were re-recorded by the band after they signed to A&M Records. "Keli Richards" and "Angels Tonight" were re-recorded and included on the 1991 EP Up and Crumbling. "Hey Jealousy", "Found Out About You", "Cajun Song", and "Lost Horizons" were re-recorded and included on Gin Blossoms' 1992 album, New Miserable Experience. "Idiot Summer" was re-recorded during the sessions for New Miserable Experience but was not released until it was in the 1993 movie, Wayne's World 2. The song was also a B-side on the original single release for "Follow You Down" and can now be found on streaming services both on the Til I Hear It from You EP as well as the Deluxe Edition reissue of New Miserable Experience.

The album in general has a faster tempo and a less produced sound than New Miserable Experience.

== Track listing ==
No.	Title	Writer(s)	Length
1.	"Lost Horizons"	Hopkins	2:48
2.	"Cajun Song"	Valenzuela	2:43
3.	"Found Out About You"	Hopkins	3:19
4.	"Girls Can't Wait"	Valenzuela	3:00
5.	"Something Wrong"	Valenzuela	2:40
6.	"Idiot Summer"	Wilson	3:50
7.	"Angels Tonight"	Hopkins	2:36
8.	"Keli Richards"	Hopkins, Leen	2:31
9.	"Hey Jealousy"	Hopkins	3:30
10.	"I Can Sleep"	Valenzuela	3:31
11.	"Slave Dealer's Daughter"	Hopkins, Leen	2:33
12.	"Fireworks"	Hopkins	3:06

== Personnel ==
- Robin Wilson – lead vocals, acoustic guitar, tambourine
- Doug Hopkins – lead guitar
- Jesse Valenzuela – rhythm guitar, background vocals, lead vocals on "Something Wrong", "I Can Sleep", and "Fireworks"
- Bill Leen – bass guitar
- Phillip Rhodes – drums
