= Anthony Parker (defensive back, born 1966) =

American football player (born 1966)

No. 43, 31, 41, 27
- Position: Cornerback

Personal information
- Born: February 11, 1966 (age 60); Sylacauga, Alabama, U.S.
- Listed height: 5 ft 10 in (1.78 m)
- Listed weight: 181 lb (82 kg)

Career information
- High school: McClintock (Tempe, Arizona)
- College: Arizona State
- NFL draft: 1989: undrafted

Career history
- Indianapolis Colts (1989); New York Jets (1990)*; New York/New Jersey Knights (1991); Phoenix Cardinals (1991)*; Kansas City Chiefs (1991); Minnesota Vikings (1992–1994); St. Louis Rams (1995–1996); Tampa Bay Buccaneers (1997–1998)
- * Offseason or practice squad member only

Awards and highlights
- Second-team All-Pac-10 (1985)

Career NFL statistics
- Tackles: 363
- Interceptions: 15
- Fumble recoveries: 8
- Stats at Pro Football Reference

Will Anthony Parker (born February 11, 1966) is an American former professional football player who was a cornerback for nine seasons in the National Football League (NFL), including three seasons with the Minnesota Vikings. He played college football for the Arizona State Sun Devils.

Parker attended McClintock High School in Tempe, Arizona, before attending Arizona State University. His son, Colin, was a redshirt freshman at Arizona State during the 2007 season.
