= Found Out About You =

1989 song by Gin Blossoms

Single by Gin Blossoms

from the album New Miserable Experience
- B-side: "Hands Are Tied"
- Released: 1993
- Genre: Jangle pop; alternative rock
- Length: 3:53
- Label: A&M
- Songwriter: Doug Hopkins
- Producers: John Hampton; Gin Blossoms

Gin Blossoms singles chronology
| "Until I Fall Away" (1993) | "Found Out About You" (1993) | "Allison Road" (1994) |

Music video
- "Found Out About You" on YouTube

"Found Out About You" is a song by American rock band Gin Blossoms, released by A&M Records as the fourth single from their second studio album, New Miserable Experience (1992). Written by lead guitarist Doug Hopkins, who was fired from the band after the album, it first appeared on their 1989 debut recording, Dusted. The song was produced by the band with John Hampton and peaked at number 25 on the US Billboard Hot 100 and number 40 on the UK Singles Chart.

== Background ==
"Found Out About You" was written by Hopkins in the mid-1980s and was the first song that singer Robin Wilson recalled demoing with the band when he joined. Wilson explained,

The first time we ever demo'd "Found Out About You" we knew it was a hit song. I remember that being a significant event in my mind, when we were in the studio doing that song. I was sitting out on my car and what I imagined to be a hit song was a bunch of kids dancing to it at the Devil House. We were listening to it and Bill [Leen, the bassist] looked over at me and said, "Hey, wow, this song is going to get you a lot of women, isn't it?" I was just like "Yeah, whatever."

Hopkins had high hopes for making a hit. Wilson recalled that Hopkins was "very specific" about how the vocals for the song turned out.

"Found Out About You"
Chorus and start of another verse

The song was a favorite of the band, with both Wilson and the drummer Rhodes naming it as Hopkins's best song. Rhodes commented, "In my opinion, that is the best song he ever wrote, and it is the best song on the record." Wilson explained, "I knew that song had to be the best vocal of my entire life. I knew that song had to be perfect, at least from my angle. Everybody else did it perfectly, and I had to rise up to the challenge as well....He wanted it to be a hit record and I'm glad it is; it's a great song."

== Release ==
"Found Out About You" reached number 25 on the US Billboard Hot 100, making it the second single from the album (after "Hey Jealousy") to enter the top 40. The song found the most success in Canada, where it reached number three on the RPM 100 Hit Tracks chart. Elsewhere, the song barely reached the top 40 in the United Kingdom and peaked at number 94 on Australia's ARIA Singles Chart in September 1994.

== Critical reception ==
"Found Out About You" saw praise from music critics. Ed Masley of The Arizona Republic listed the song as the Gin Blossoms' second best song on his list of their top 30 tracks, writing, "There's a haunting, almost psychedelic quality to the interweaving guitar lines and overall vibe of 'Found Out About You,' at once recalling R.E.M. at their hypnotic best and something closer to garage rock." Alan Jones from Music Week gave it three out of five, saying, "The follow-up to the excellent debut hit 'Hey Jealousy' is a similarly retro guitar-based track. It lacks the cute devices that made 'Hey Jealousy' such a favourite, but is a sterling piece of work that recalls Eighties acts like Any Trouble and Joe Jackson. A mid-charting hit but, more importantly, one that is likely to boost their album, New Miserable Experience."

== Track listings ==
- US cassette single

A. "Found Out About You" – 3:53
B. "Hands Are Tied" – 3:17

- UK 7-inch single

A. "Found Out About You" – 3:53
B. "Hey Jealousy" (live) – 3:59

- UK and European CD single
1. "Found Out About You" – 3:53
2. "Hey Jealousy" (live) – 3:59
3. "Hold Me Down" (live) – 4:35
4. "Mrs Rita" (live) – 4:20

== Charts ==
=== Weekly charts ===
| Chart (1994) | Peak position |
|---|---|
| Australia (ARIA) | 94 |
| Canada Top Singles (RPM) | 3 |
| Europe (Eurochart Hot 100) | 100 |
| Scottish Singles Sales (Official Charts) | 51 |
| UK Singles (Official Charts) | 40 |
| US Billboard Hot 100 | 25 |
| US Adult Contemporary (Billboard) | 31 |
| US Adult Pop Airplay (Billboard) | 38 |
| US Alternative Airplay (Billboard) | 1 |
| US Mainstream Rock (Billboard) | 5 |
| US Pop Airplay (Billboard) | 6 |
| US Cash Box Top 100 | 30 |

=== Year-end charts ===
| Chart (1994) | Position |
|---|---|
| Canada Top Singles (RPM) | 35 |
| US Billboard Hot 100 | 51 |
| US Album Rock Tracks (Billboard) | 20 |

== Release history ==
| Region | Date | Format(s) | Label(s) | Ref. |
|---|---|---|---|---|
| United States | 1993 | 7-inch vinyl; cassette | A&M | |
| United Kingdom | April 5, 1994 | 7-inch vinyl; CD; cassette | Fontana | |
| Australia | August 8, 1994 | CD; cassette | A&M; Polydor | |

== See also ==
- Number one modern rock hits of 1994
