= Agnese Udinotti =

American painter, poet and sculptor

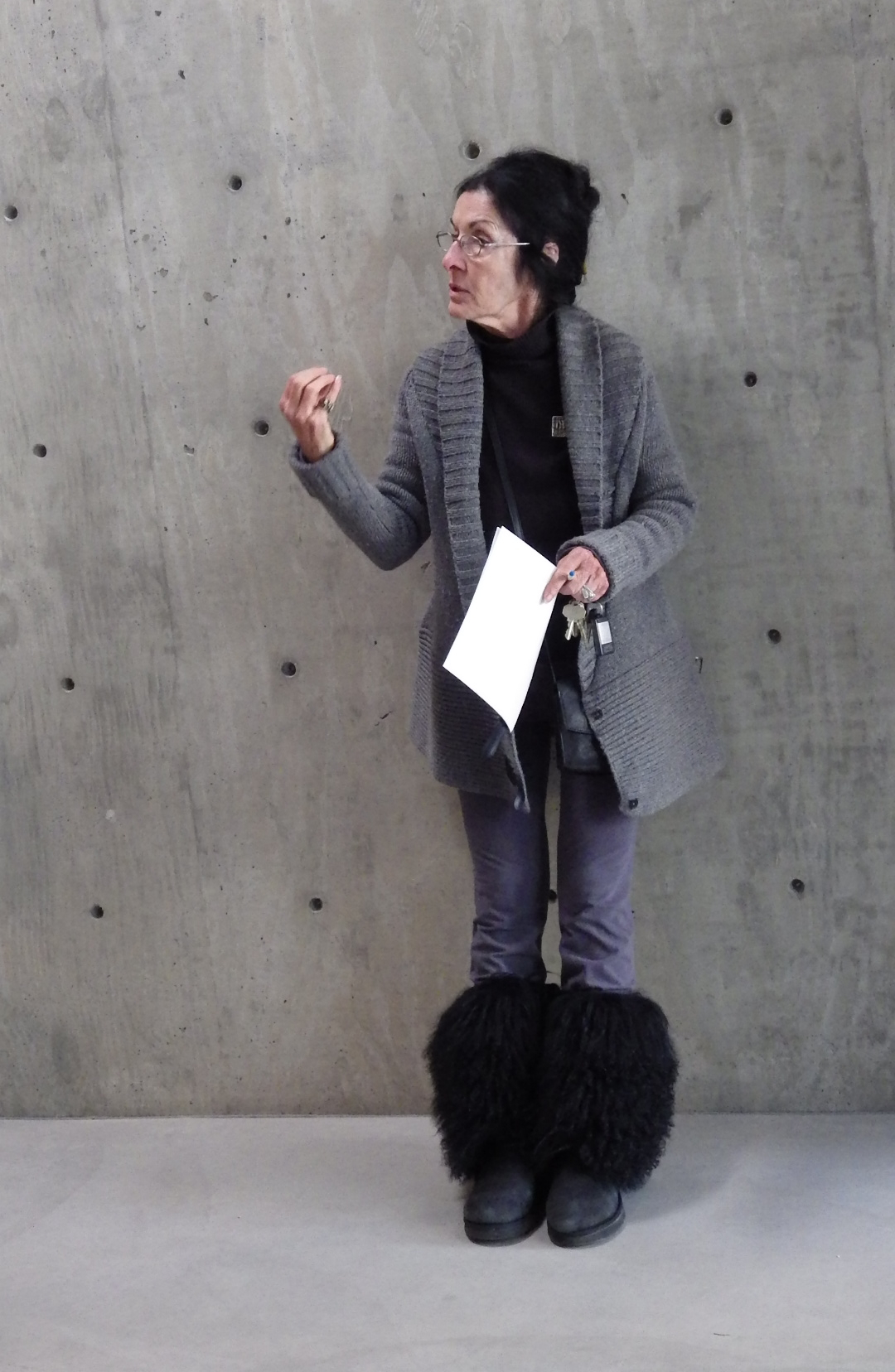
- Udinotti in 2014
- Born: January 9, 1940; Athens
- Education: Arizona State University
- Known for: Poet, sculptor, writer, painter; founder of the Udinotti Museum of Figurative Art
- Notable work: Monument to My Father, Shadow Images, Udinotti
- Style: Figurative

Agnese Udinotti (born 1940) is a Greek-born American poet, sculptor, writer, and painter.

Born in Athens, Udinotti earned both her bachelor's and master's degree, in 1962 and 1963 respectively, from Arizona State University. Her work has appeared in many solo and group exhibitions, both in the United States and abroad, and she has received a number of honors and awards. She was for a time poetry editor of the magazine Chimera. Museums which own examples of her art include the Phoenix Art Museum, the National Gallery of Athens, the Vorres Museum, the Glendale Community College Sculpture Garden and the National Museum of Women in the Arts; her work is also in numerous private and corporate collections, and she has produced sculpture for the General Services Administration. Udinotti is the founder of the Udinotti Museum of Figurative Art in Arizona.

Udinotti is the author of Udinotti, a collection of her writings illustrated with photographs of her sculpture.

== Early life ==
Udinotti was born on January 9, 1940, in Greece. Her father was executed by the Communists after World War II, when Udinotti was only four years old. The Communists arrested her father, who they suspected of working against their interests, and executed him alongside 2,000 prisoners, during the Dekemvriana events, outside of Athens. This tragedy would later affect Udinotti's work, such as her commemorative series called "Monument to My Father." Barely a teenager when she left for the United States, where she enrolled at Arizona State University.

== Works ==
Udinotti has stated that her father has been the leading inspiration for her art and in making herself successful. In 1987, she began working on the series called "Monument to My Father," which was her first three-dimensional work. This consists of oil paints and plaster with her written poetry on stelae.

Then she began "Shadow Images", which was a commemorative piece after for her mother's death. This consists of graphite with the use of negative space.

In 2000, Udinotti began founding the Udinotti Museum of Figurative Art, a personally-funded and private organization. She was dedicated to educating and sharing with the public the ancient messages of art. She then worked towards curating the artworks and planning the construction of the museum. It officially opened in November 2007.
