= Angela Ellsworth =

American artist

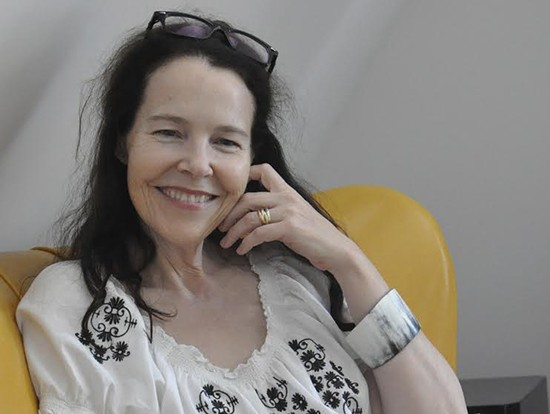
- Born: Angela Ellsworth; Palo Alto, California
- Education: Hampshire College (BFA); Rutgers University (MFA)
- Partner: Tania Katan 2006-present
- Website: aellsworth.com

Angela Ellsworth is a multidisciplinary American artist traversing disciplines of drawing, sculpture, installation, video, and performance.

== Education ==
Ellsworth studied at Hampshire College, in Amherst, Massachusetts, where she received a bachelor's degree in fine art, and graduated from the Mason Gross School of the Arts of Rutgers University in New Brunswick, New Jersey, with a Master of Fine Arts degree in performance and painting. She attended Skowhegan School of Painting and Sculpture on a fellowship. Ellsworth is a professor in the School of Art at ASU Herberger Institute for Design and the Arts at Arizona State University.

== Career ==
Her solo and collaborative works have addressed wide-ranging subjects such as physical fitness, endurance, illness, social ritual, and religious tradition. She is interested in art merging with everyday life and public and private experiences colliding in unexpected places.

Ellsworth has exhibited at the Museum of Contemporary Art in Sydney, Australia, and at the Arizona State University Art Museum in Tempe, Arizona. She is one of the founders of the Museum of Walking (MoW) which is the only museum of its kind in the United States. Her work can be found in Art News, Fiber Arts, Landscape Architecture Magazine, Canadian Art, Frieze Art, Artforum.com, and Performance Research.

She has presented work nationally and internationally including the Getty Center (Los Angeles), Museum of Contemporary Art (Sydney), Australia), Zacheta National Gallery of Art (Warsaw, Poland), National Review of Live Art (Glasgow, Scotland), Los Angeles Contemporary Exhibitions (Los Angeles, California), Crystal Bridges (Bentonville, Arkansas), Arizona State University Art Museum (Tempe, Arizona), Museum of Contemporary Art (Denver), Colorado), Scottsdale Museum of Contemporary Art (Scottsdale, Arizona), and Phoenix Art Museum (Phoenix, Arizona.)

Awards and grants include Art Matters, Franklin Furnace, New Jersey State Council on the Arts, The Pennsylvania Council for the Arts, New Forms Regional Initiative Grant, from Mexic-Arte Museum, and DiverseWorks, funded by The Andy Warhol Foundation and The Rockefeller Foundation. She is represented by Lisa Sette Gallery in Phoenix Arizona and Modern West Fine Art, Salt Lake City.

== Personal life ==
Ellsworth is a descendant of LDS prophet Lorenzo Snow and was raised as a Mormon; some of her work relates to her religious upbringing. She is openly queer and married to writer/ performer Tania Katan.

== Selected solo exhibitions and performance (2018–2008) ==
For exhibitions before 2008, check out her Curriculum Vitae
Year	Title	Gallery/Museum	Location	Notes
2018	Angela Ellsworth: Holding Pattern	Lisa Sette Gallery	Phoenix, Arizona	
2018	Angela Ellsworth: Leaving Loves Company	University of Illinois	Springfield, Illinois	
2018	Angela Ellsworth: Between Them	Western New Mexico University	Silver City, New Mexico	
2015	Angela Ellsworth: Volume I	Joseph Gross Gallery	Tucson, Arizona	
2014	Stand Back	Crystal Bridges	Bentonville, Arkansas	Action/Interaction, (performance)
2014	Angela Ellsworth: Volume	Lisa Sette Gallery	Scottsdale, Arizona	
2014	Soundproofed Laboratory	Scottsdale Museum of Contemporary Art	Scottsdale, Arizona	
2014	Promiscuous Code/ Plural Wife Project	Julius Caesar Gallery	Chicago, Illinois	(Two-person with ATOM-r: Mark Jeffrey & Judd Morrissey)
2012-11	Seeing Is Believing: Rebecca Campbell and Angela Ellsworth	Phoenix Art Museum	Phoenix, Arizona	(Installation, Sculpture, and Performance)
2011	Training, Walking, and Drawing	Fehily Contemporary	Melbourne, Australia	
2011	They May Appear in Alone, in Lines, or in Clusters	Lisa Sette Gallery	Scottsdale, Arizona	
2011	Where The Skies Are Blue	Arizona State University Art Museum	Tempe, Arizona	(Performance)
2010	Angela Ellsworth: Seer Bonnets: A Continuing Offense	Snow College Gallery	Ephraim, Utah	
2010	Meanwhile, Back At The Ranch	Museum of Contemporary Art	17th Biennale of Sydney, Australia	(Performance)
2010	Another Women’s Movement	IN>TIME, Chicago Cultural Center	Chicago, Illinois	(Performance)
2010	Another Women’s Movement	Murphy Hall Fine Arts Building, Loyola Marymount University	Los Angeles, California	(Performance)
2009	Underpinnings	Lisa Sette Gallery	Scottsdale, Arizona	
2009	Compounded	Lisa Sette Gallery	Scottsdale, Arizona	(Performance)
2009	Arte Gigante Variety Hour	Scottsdale Museum of Contemporary Art, Stage 2 Theatre,	Scottsdale, Arizona	Artist on Artist Series, Collaboration with Rico Reyes (Performance)
2008	Overflow	The Getty Center	Los Angeles, California	Reinvention of Allan Kaprow’s Fluids, Collaboration with LA Art Girls (Performance)
2008	Is This The Place II	University of California	Santa Cruz, California	Intervene! Interrupt! Rethinking art as Social Practice (Performance)
2008	Pace Yourself II: Flexible Detection of Sound	Glendale Temporary Public Art Project	Glendale, Arizona	(Performance)
2008	Drawing on Site,	National Review of Live Art	Glasgow, Scotland	Depicting Action (Performance)
