= McClintock High School =

Location
- 1830 East Del Rio Drive; Tempe, Arizona 85282; United States; 33°23′53″N 111°54′25″W

Information
- Type: Public
- Established: 1964; 62 years ago
- School district: Tempe Union High School District
- Principal: Mark Gorman
- PPA Academic Coordinator: Kathleen Pugh
- Staff: 90.20 (FTE)
- Grades: 9–99
- Enrollment: 1,757 (2023-2024)
- Student to teacher ratio: 19.48
- Schedule: 1 7:25am - 8:25am 2 8:30am - 9:30am 3 9:35am - 10:35am 4 10:40am - 11:40am (Lunch A); 5 11:15am - 12:15pm (Lunch B); 6 12:20pm - 1:20pm 7 1:25pm - 2:25pm 8 2:30pm - 3:30pm Lunch A 10:35am - 11:10am Lunch B 11:40am - 12:15pm
- Colors: Charger red and blue
- Mascot: Charlie The Charger
- Team name: Chargers
- Website: http://www.tempeunion.org/mcclintock

McClintock High School is a high school located in Tempe, Arizona, approximately two miles southeast of the campus of Arizona State University. McClintock High School was established in 1964. The school was named after James H. McClintock.

McClintock has approximately 1,900 students and offers a wide variety of curriculum, which includes honors, advanced placement, dual credit, and the Peggy Payne Academy for gifted students. The school also has state-recognized ELL and Special Education programs. McClintock is an open enrollment campus.

The campus was designed in 1964 by local architect Kemper Goodwin.

Artist Ka Graves served as artist-in-residence at McClintock High School in 1979 and 1980.

== Peggy Payne Academy ==
The Peggy Payne Academy for Academic Excellence, or PPA, is a program for student at McClintock. Founded in 2001 with 4 students, the program now serves hundreds of students in all major academic subjects. To maintain a standard of gifted students, PPA requires a Cognitive Abilities Test Score in at least the 97th percentile

== Athletics ==
=== Football ===
McClintock High School played its home games at Goodwin Stadium until its own lighted stadium, Jim Lyon's Stadium, was constructed.

McClintock's main rival in football has been Tempe High School since 1964. Tempe and McClintock have annual, non-conference rivalry games. McClintock has been the historical favorite in the matchup, although returning to their dominance since 2017.

The Chargers' first state football title came in 1977, when the team went undefeated and captured the championship with a 14–9 playoff victory over Phoenix's Washington High School. Three years later, the Chargers posted a 12–2 record and won their second title by defeating Phoenix's Trevor Browne High School in the 1980 championship game. Their third state title in 1989 capped a 13–2 season that ended with a 42–14 playoff victory over Mesa's Westwood High.

=== State and national championships ===
- 2022 – Division II Boys Track & Field Team Champions
- 2012 – Division III Marching Band Champions
- 2010 – Spiritline National Champions
- 2010 – 4A-I Boys' Basketball State Champions
- 2007 – 4A-I Boys' Baseball State Champions

== Notable alumni ==
- Jules Asner – actress
- Tony Carrillo – comics artist
- Roger Clyne - lead vocalist of the Refreshments
- Gabe Freeman - basketball player
- Future
- Doug Hopkins – former musician with the Gin Blossoms
- Tank Johnson – football player
- Jason Kyle – football player
- Jeff Larish – Major League Baseball player
- Bill Leen – musician with the Gin Blossoms
- Dan Manucci – football player
- Mike Mendoza – Major League Baseball player
- Rick Neuheisel – football player, college head coach and broadcaster
- Anthony Parker – football player
- Daniel Patterson – guitarist for Phunk Junkeez
- Shawn Patterson – football player
- Matt Perisho – Major League Baseball player
- Mark D. Ramirez – author and professor at Arizona State University
- David Tab Rasmussen (1958–2014) – biological anthropologist
- Phillip "Phil" Rhodes – drummer with the Gin Blossoms
- Jason Butler Rote (Jason Rote) – TV/film writer-creator (animation)
- Bridget S. Bade - attorney and federal judge
- James G. Stavridis - U.S. Navy admiral, diplomat, author, educator
- John Tait – football player
- Kenny Wheaton – football player
- Robin Wilson - frontman of the Gin Blossoms
