= Michael Grant (television) =

American lawyer (1951–2024)

Michael Murray Grant
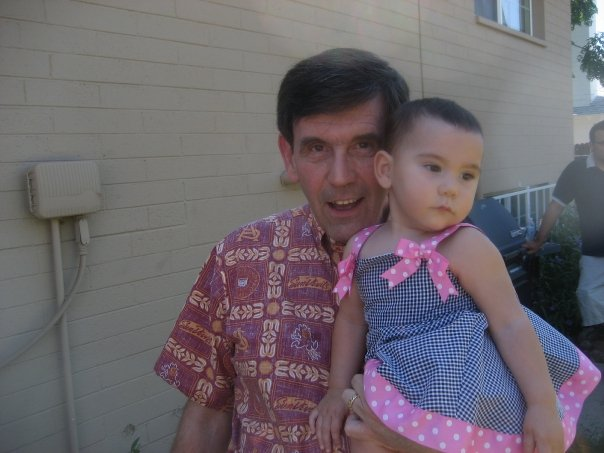
- Grant with his granddaughter in 2009
- Born: July 16, 1951
- Died: July 15, 2024 (aged 72)
- Education: Arizona State University (B.A. English, 1973; J.D., 1976)
- Occupations: Television host, lawyer
- Known for: Hosting Arizona PBS Horizon
- Spouse: Dawn Grant
- Children: 2

Michael Murray Grant (July 16, 1951 – July 15, 2024) was an attorney and host of the Arizona public television program Horizon on KAET from 1981 to 2007. Before his work on Horizon, Grant worked in Arizona radio as a disc jockey and an investigative reporter, most notably for KOY radio.

Born in Hutchinson, Kansas, Grant got his start on Arizona television by covering Sandra Day O'Connor's Senate confirmation hearings for KAET Channel 8 and PBS. After the hearings, KAET producers came to Grant with a concept for a daily discussion show. The special Friday edition was to be modeled after Washington Week in Review. Known as the roundtable discussion, local journalists would review the week's top news stories in an informal, conversational format. Monday through Thursday's shows would focus on interviews with subjects close to a particular newsworthy event or issue.

Grant was with Horizon for over a quarter century and hosted the 25th anniversary edition of the show on October 19, 2006. Grant hosted his last Horizon show as the regular moderator on January 26, 2007, although he acted as a fill-in host on a few subsequent occasions.

Grant received his bachelor's degree in English from Arizona State University in 1973 and his Juris Doctor from ASU in 1976. His legal career centered around telecommunications and public utility law. He retired from the practice of law in 2014.

Grant died on July 15, 2024, one day short of his 73rd birthday. He is survived by his widow Dawn, to whom he was married for 49 years, his son Justin and daughter Allison, and his three grandchildren.
