= Rebecca Medel =

American artist

- Born: 1947 (age 77–78); Denver, Colorado, U.S.
- Known for: Fiber artist, sculptor
- Website: sites.google.com/site/rebeccamedel2010

Rebecca Medel (born 1947 in Denver, Colorado) is an American artist known for sculptural fiber art. She attended Arizona State University and the University of California, Los Angeles. In 2010 she became Fellow of the American Craft Council. Her work is in the Art Institute of Chicago, the Fine Arts Museums of San Francisco, the Museum of Design Zurich, and the Philadelphia Museum of Art. Her work, Framed Light, was acquired by the Smithsonian American Art Museum as part of the Renwick Gallery's 50th Anniversary Campaign.
