= Matt Paweski =

American sculptor

Matt Paweski (born 1980) is an American sculptor who lives and works in Los Angeles. His sculptures sit between sculpture and functional design, referencing carpentry and furniture making.

== Background ==
Paweski was born in Detroit, US, in 1980. He completed his BFA at Arizona State University in Tempe, US in 2005 before earning his MFA in Fine Art from the Art Center College of Design, Pasadena, US, graduating in 2009.

== Exhibitions ==
Paweski's work has been exhibited at Palais de Tokyo, Paris, Arizona State University Art Museum, Tempe, Phoenix Art Museum, Phoenix, US, Santa Monica College, California, ArtCenter College of Design, Pasadena and OCTAGON, Milan.
