= John Randall Nelson =

American painter and sculptor

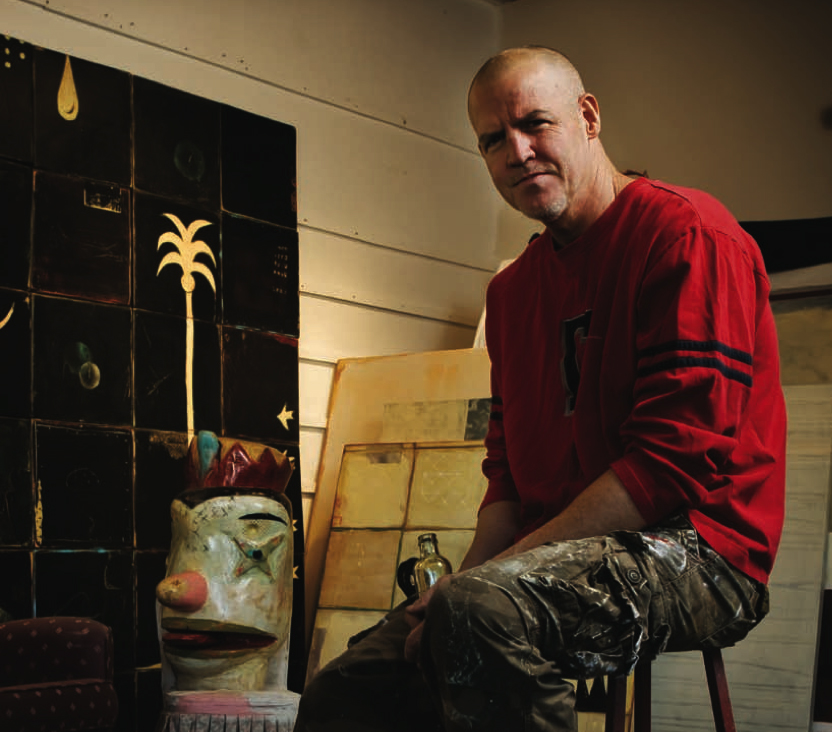
- John Randall Nelson in his studio, 2008
- Born: 1956 (age 69–70); Princeton, Illinois
- Known for: Public art, sculpture, installation art, painting

John Randall Nelson (born 1956) is an American painter and sculptor based in Phoenix, Arizona.

== Biography ==
Nelson began developing his visual style as a freelance illustrator in the 1990s, with work included in publications such as The New York Times, The Washington Post and Rolling Stone. In the 2000s, Nelson's career as a painter began to take root. He completed his Master of Fine Arts degree at Arizona State University in 1995. In his 1999 show In Process at ASU, he began to develop the personal language of symbols and archetypes for which he is now known. Nelson, as a nationally exhibited artist, has a long-standing reputation for his honed development of urban-neo-folk icons and characters. The objects, text and characters that have repeatedly appeared in his artistic oeuvre have become an identifiable vocabulary for his work.

Over the past 25 years, Nelson has actively shown in group and solo shows in Los Angeles, Seattle, San Francisco, Dallas, Santa Fe, and Phoenix. One of his most ambitious shows took place at Bentley Projects warehouse space in Phoenix in 2005 and featured a mixed media re-imagining of life in a transient hotel using video, large scale installation, painting and collaboration with writer Eric Susser. In 2018, Nelson mounted his second institutional solo exhibition, John Randall Nelson: An American Vernacular, at the Windgate Gallery at the University of Arkansas.

== Work ==
Nelson's work revolves around a personal language of symbols and archetypes. He "embraces the concept of artist as story teller, a chronicler of contemporary culture". The subjects of the paintings change from piece to piece and from project to project but the core of the work stems from his own personal lexicon of archetypal symbols. With a faux-naive style influenced by American Outsider Art, Nelson's paintings place graphic characters and fragments of words within a pop-art landscape of polka-dots and flat planes of color. In Nelson's own words, “what becomes prominent and what becomes buried is intuitive,” explains the artist. “I let the paintings talk, juxtaposing patterns, words and symbols to create a mishmash of meaning.”

Kathryn M. Davis wrote in ARTnews that Nelson's “sly paintings conjure cartoons, found signage, and modern hieroglyphs, and tie them together with lusciously patinated surfaces.

== Public Art ==
Nelson began his career as a public artist with Harry above the Crowd, a 35-foot sculpture commissioned by the City of Tempe that commemorated city councilman and mayor Harry Mitchell. Since then he has designed and produced over 20 public art projects including commissions for Sky Harbor International Airport, Wells Fargo Bank, the cities of Phoenix, Scottsdale, and Mesa, the Phoenix Children's Hospital, and the BIO5 Institute at the University of Arizona.

In 2018, Scottsdale Public Art installed Nelson's One-Eyed Jack, a 26-foot tall, 20,000-pound painted steel jackrabbit at an entry point to Old-Town Scottsdale's arts district. The piece drew upon the rabbit's symbolism as a "a symbol of magic, transformation, and intuition" but was not without some local controversy. In the end, the project was installed and led to several other important public commissions for Nelson. Almost immediately, he designed and installed Whitefish for Glacier House Hotels in Whitefish, Montana.

In 2019, Nelson designed 45 Haikus, consisting of 45 steel symbols that hung off of existing light posts based on haiku poems written by Mesa public school students. The piece stretched along Main Street in the center of the city. He followed that work with Flora, Fauna, Humana, installed at the City of Mesa's light rail stations, and featuring botanical vernacular that touch upon themes of growth, potential and transformation.
