= Kasma Loha-unchit =

Thai-American food writer and teacher (born 1950)

- Born: 1950 (age 75–76); Thailand
- Education: Arizona State University (undergraduate), University of California, Berkeley (master's degree in business)
- Occupations: cooking teacher, author, tour guide

Kasma Loha-unchit (born 1950 in Thailand) is a Thai-American cooking teacher, author, and tour guide.

== Biography ==
Loha-unchit grew up in Thailand, outside of Bangkok in the countryside. Her parents were Chinese. In 1968, she moved to the United States to attend college. She settled in the San Francisco area in 1972. Loha-unchit earned her master's degree in business from the University of California, Berkeley. She had attended Arizona State for her undergraduate degree. After school, she married her first husband, who committed suicide when she was twenty-nine.

For some time, she worked as a marketing analyst, but started cooking, teaching and giving tours in 1985. She began offering cooking classes to earn extra income, drawing on what she had learned from her mother and grandmother. Eventually she shifted to teaching full-time, wrote two books on Thai cuisine, and started offering "food tours" to different regions of Thailand. She is currently married to her second husband, Michael Babcock. Professionally, she has kept the name Loha-unchit, as is shown clearly in the cited biography.

In April 2015 she indicated that she will be retiring from teaching and tour-leading within the next several years.

== Work ==
Loha-unchit teaches hands on cooking classes in a private kitchen. Loha-unchit has been teaching out of her own cooking school in the San Francisco Bay Area since 1985. Her teaching method involves introducing students to Thai culture as well as Thai cuisine. She takes students to Asian markets and teaches them about the ingredients they use. The name of her company is Thai Food and Travel.

Loha-unchit writes entirely on Thai cooking. Her first book, It Rains Fishes: Legends, Traditions and the Joys of Thai Cooking, won the 1996 Julia Child Award as Best International Cookbook for 1995. The Chicago Tribune called It Rains Fishes "a real charmer" and described how the book introduces readers to both Thai cooking and Thai culture. Her second book, Dancing Shrimp, was published in 2000 and was described by Restaurant Hospitality as helping Western chefs easily learn Thai cooking. The Chicago Tribune described Dancing Shrimp as an exploration of "the cuisine of her homeland through a variety of the seafood so plentiful in Thailand." The title of Dancing Shrimp comes from a type of Thai dish made of tiny, translucent freshwater shrimp.

Loha-unchit offers guided culinary tours to Thailand.
