= Robert Harvey Oshatz =

American architect (born 1945)

Robert Harvey Oshatz (born October 3, 1945) is an American architect based in Lake Oswego, Oregon. Friends of Kebyar Journal includes his work in multiple publications "focused on notable organic architects". He is known for architecture "incorporated into the surrounding land", "intricately woven though its site" and more than once likened to spaceships. The work has gained international recognition for his approach to architecture.

== Early life and education ==
Oshatz was born in Los Angeles, California, and completed undergraduate studies in architecture at Arizona State University.

== Career ==
He apprenticed at the Los Angeles Studio of Frank Lloyd Wright, Jr. and established his own architectural practice, Robert Harvey Oshatz Architect, in Portland, Oregon in 1971.

His work is characterized by the integration of organic forms, extensive use of wood and other natural materials, and an emphasis on sustainable design principles. Yaacov Bergman, past music director and conductor of the Portland Chamber Orchestra has described Oshatz-designed homes, "as though I’m watching the visualization of a musical composition”.

The Wilkinson Residence in Portland (completed in 2007) has sweeping curves, extensive use of wood, and large expanses of glass that provide panoramic views of the surrounding forest.

== Design philosophy ==
Oshatz believes that architecture should be a continuation of nature, rather than a separation from it. He often draws inspiration from the organic forms and patterns found in the natural world, incorporating them into his designs to create a sense of harmony and tranquility. The buildings are designed "from the inside out" and the interior spaces are often composed with non-parallel surfaces to enhance room acoustics depending on the intended use of the space.

Oshatz is also a proponent of sustainable architecture, advocating eco-friendly materials and technologies such as ground source heat pumps that minimize the environmental impact of his projects.

== Notable works ==
- Windship (2019) - Olympic Peninsula, Washington
- Chenequa residence (2012) - Milwaukee, Wisconsin
- Wilkinson Residence (2007) - Portland, Oregon
- Miyasaka Residence (1998) - Obihiro, Hokkaido, Japan
- Fennell Residence (1990) - Portland, Oregon
- Elk Rock Residence and Studio (1989) - Lake Oswego, Oregon
- Studio City Residence (1985) - Studio City, California
