= Ka Graves =

American assemblage and mixed media artist

Ka Graves (born 1938) is an American assemblage and mixed media artist.

Born Kathleen Dragunajtys in Detroit, Graves is the daughter of Polish and Hungarian parents. She earned her associate degree from the American College in Paris in 1974. She then traveled to Arizona State University, where she received her Bachelor of Fine Arts degree in 1974; her Master of Fine Arts degree in 1979; and did graduate work in anthropology from 1987 to 1988. She taught painting and drawing at Grand Canyon Community College from 1983 to 1984, and in 1979 and 1980 was artist-in-residence at McClintock High School. Graves creates work derived from religious and ethnic ritual. She has exhibited widely throughout the United States in solo and group shows, and is represented in numerous public and private collections. In 1986 she created costumes and scenic design for the opera Wilbur by Randall Shinn.
