= Dan Lam =

American contemporary sculptor

- Born: 3 June 1988; Morong, Bataan, Philippines
- Education: University of North Texas, Arizona State University
- Known for: Sculpture, non-traditional materials
- Movement: New contemporary, psychedelic art

Dan Lam is an American sculptor of Vietnamese ancestry, best known for her "drippy" sculptures and use of vibrant color. Using non-traditional materials of polyurethane foam, acrylic paint and epoxy resin, her finished work often dangles over shelf ledges, contrasting emotions of desire and disgust. Lam lives and works in Dallas.

== Early life and education ==
Lam's parents fled Vietnam in 1986, spending years moving around Southeast Asia. Lam was born in a refugee camp in Morong, Bataan, Philippines, where she spent the first few months of her life as her parents awaited sponsorship from family in Houston, Texas, where she spent the first several years of her childhood. An only child, Lam spent substantial time alone making things with whatever materials she had at hand, an inclination which blossomed once exposed to her first art classes in grade school.

Lam earned bachelor's and master's degrees in Drawing and Painting from the University of North Texas and Arizona State University, respectively. As a graduate student one professor challenged her for making things "too pretty," which inspired her to explore concepts of excessive beauty.

== Work ==
After graduate school, Lam moved to Midland, Texas, where she began a year of solitary work in her studio. During this time, desiring more contact with the artistic community, she turned to social media by opening an Instagram account, where her work began to capture attention quickly. In 2016, her following on that platform grew rapidly from approximately 11,000 followers, to over 76,000, and included celebrities such as Miley Cyrus, an event which coincided with growing recognition in the art world of the importance of social media. One video of Lam's finger poking a molten "squish" resembling a sprinkled birthday cake received over 15 million views, and giant forms of her work have been featured as combination art exhibit and social media marketing campaign, further identifying Lam with the most recent trends allowing artists to make contact with the world.

boundary of perception where beauty seems to become too much, suddenly flipping to the grotesque. Her sculptures range from intense, bright colored, smooth liquid-like surfaces that invite the touch, to spikey dangerous looking forms, and even ones completely encrusted with Swarovski crystal rhinestones. Along with exploring the zone between attraction and repulsion, Lam plays with themes of organic vs. inanimate, seriousness vs. playfulness, soft and hard. Lam attempts to find a balance between and among these contradictory concepts to evoke emotions and thoughtful consideration of shifting lines and perception. This exploration of the boundary between the beautiful and the ugly creates different responses among those who view her art, demonstrated by a growing following, while simultaneously garnering reactions among a few that are intense enough to be described as becoming "physically ill."

== Influences ==
Artists who have inspired Lam's work include Eva Hesse, Claes Oldenburg, and Lynda Benglis.

== Exhibitions ==
Solo

Crave the Unexpected (collaboration with Steve's Ice Cream) at Institute of Contemporary Art, Boston
Delicious Monster at Hashimoto Contemporary, New York City, New York
Infinite Playground at Stephanie Chefas Projects, Portland, Oregon
Coquette at Fort Works Art, Fort Worth, Texas

Group
Watch This Space at Lazinc x Danysz Gallery, London, England
Shapes and Illusions at Danysz Gallery, Paris, France
LURE presented by Tax Collection, Guy Hepner, New York City, New York

== Gallery ==
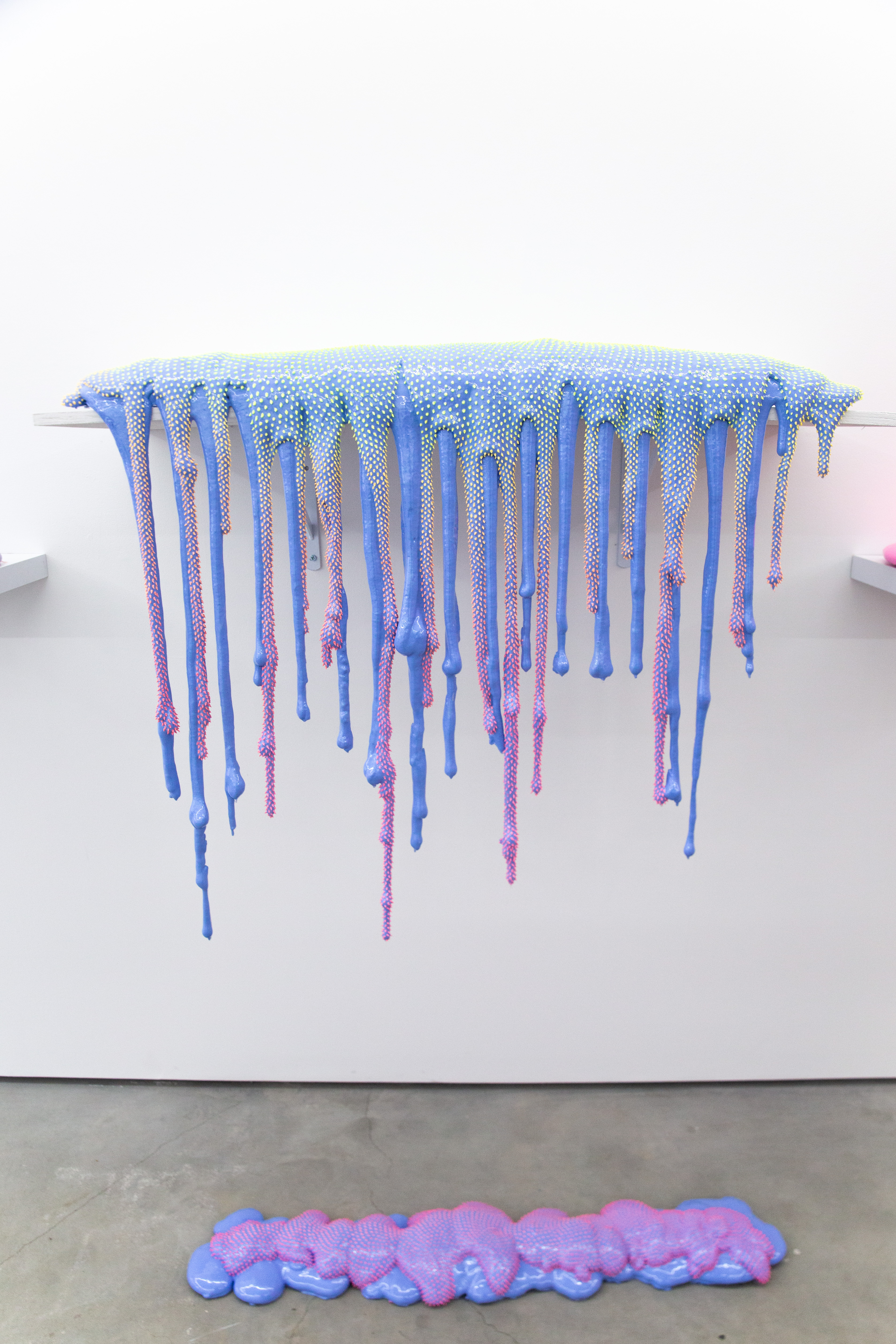
Delicious Monster installation
