= Michelle Cruz Skinner =

Filipino-American writer

Michelle Cruz Skinner (born 1965) is a Philippine-born educator and writer living in Hawaii.

The daughter of an American father from Indiana and a Filipino mother from Manila, she was born in Manila and spent her formative years at the United States Naval Base Subic Bay before moving to Honolulu in 1983. She was educated at the University of Hawaiʻi and Arizona State University and went on to teach at Punahou School in Honolulu. Her story "Faith Healer" was included in the 7th Annual PEN Syndicated Fiction Project in 1988. Her second book Mango Seasons was nominated for the 1996 Philippine National Book Award.

== Selected works ==
- Balikbayan, short stories (1986)
- Mango Seasons, short stories (1996)
- In the Company of Strangers, short stories (2009)
