= Jeffrey Sippel =

American printmaker

Jeffrey Sippel is an American printmaker. He graduated from the University of Wisconsin-Eau Claire in 1976 and studied at the Tamarind Institute from 1977 to 1979. Upon the completion of his studies at the Tamarind Institute he was certified as a master printer. He later received an MFA at Arizona State University. Sippel has taught at Druckhaus EA Quensen, worked as Master Printer at Ocean Works LEL and has taught at Ohio State University. Sippel served his tenure as the Education Director of Tamarind Institute, University of New Mexico from 1988 to1998. and currently teaches at the University of Missouri, St. Louis. Specializing in Waterless and Mokulito lithography, "his work is included in many renowned collections, including the Smithsonian Institution." Additionally, Sippel's "many presentations include lecturing in the Soviet Union, Finland, South Africa, Chile, Belgium, Poland, Germany, Bulgaria, Mexico, Canada, Argentina, Finland, New Zealand, Columbia, India, Venezuela, Serbia, and a long list of venues in the United States of America." Sippel has exhibited his work in over 200 venues including the Huntington Museum of Art, Lalit Kala Academy, the Cecille R. Hunt Gallery, Webster University, the Haggar Gallery, the University of Dallas, the Steinberg Gallery of Art, Washington University in St. Louis, the Lauren Rogers Museum of Art, the Knoxville Museum of Art, the Grunwald Center for the Arts and the University of California, Los Angeles.
