= Tammy Eagle Bull =

American architect

- Born: McLaughlin, SD
- Education: Arizona State University University of Minnesota
- Occupation: Architect
- Practice: Encompass Architects

Tamara "Tammy" Eagle Bull (FAIA, NCARB, AICAE) is a Native American architect, and president and co-founder of Encompass Architects in Lincoln, Nebraska. She is the first Native American woman in the United States to become a licensed architect.

== Early life ==
Eagle Bull is a member of the Oglala Lakota Nation in Pine Ridge, South Dakota. She was born in McLaughlin, South Dakota, raised in Aberdeen, and married her husband while practicing architecture in Minneapolis. She was encouraged early on by her father to pursue architecture to serve Native American tribes and through her architecture firm, has led several projects for Native American communities.

== Education ==
In 1987, Eagle Bull earned her bachelor's degree from Arizona State University.

In 1993, she received her Master of Architecture from the University of Minnesota.

== Career ==
In 1994, Eagle Bull became the first Native American woman to be licensed as an architect in the United States; she is licensed to practice in 11 states within the country.

She co-founded Encompass Architects with her husband, Todd Hesson, in 2002. The firm prioritizes Native American clients, though they are open to all clients. Eagle Bull values the feedback from her clients which serves as a driving force in the design in many of the firm's projects. She centers Native American culture and works in close collaboration with her clients.

Eagle Bull designed the Porcupine Day School, a two-story, 75,000-square-foot building on the Pine Ridge Reservation in Porcupine, South Dakota, which opened in 2009. The building is divided into three sections for different grade levels (K-2, 3–5, and 6–8), each with a distinct exterior color. The gymnasium includes a bamboo floor and Lakota star quilt designs can be found on other floors.

In 2018, Eagle Bull was the recipient of the Whitney M. Young Jr. Award from the American Institute of Architects and was previously the president of AIA Nebraska. In 2019, Eagle Bull was invited by the Yale School of Architecture to deliver a lecture on the relationship between architecture and indigenous people.
