= Vorres Museum =

Museum in Paiania, Athens, Greece

Coordinates: 37°57′07.25″N 23°50′50.7″E

The Vorres Museum
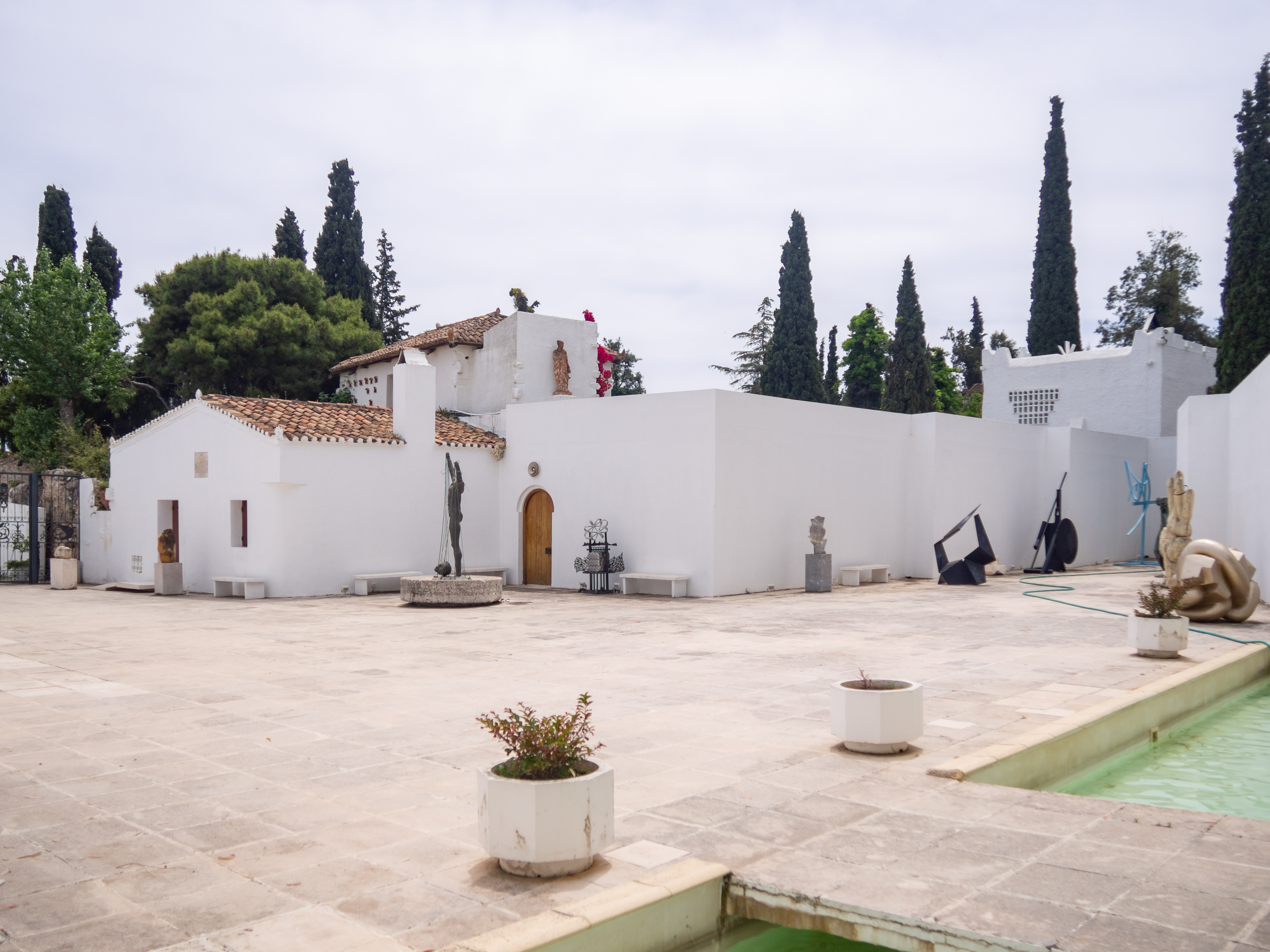
- The atrium of the museum
- Location: Paiania, Athens, Greece
- Collection size: over 6000 pieces covering 4000 years of Greek history and art.

The Vorres Museum is a diachronic museum of folk and contemporary art in Paiania, Athens, Greece. Its grounds cover 80 acres (320,000 m^{2}) including several buildings, gardens and courtyards. Its collection includes over 6000 pieces covering 4000 years of Greek history and art. The museum has been donated by the Vorres family to the Greek state.

Its President and Founder was Greek philanthropist Ian Vorres (1924 - 2015), who studied art in Canada at Queen's University in Kingston Ontario and the University of Toronto. While there he met HIH Grand Duchess Olga Alexandrovna,(the sister of Russia's last Czar Nicholas II) who asked him to write her biography, which was published in 1962 as The Last Grand Duchess.
