= Nicole Carroll (journalist) =

American journalist (born 1967)

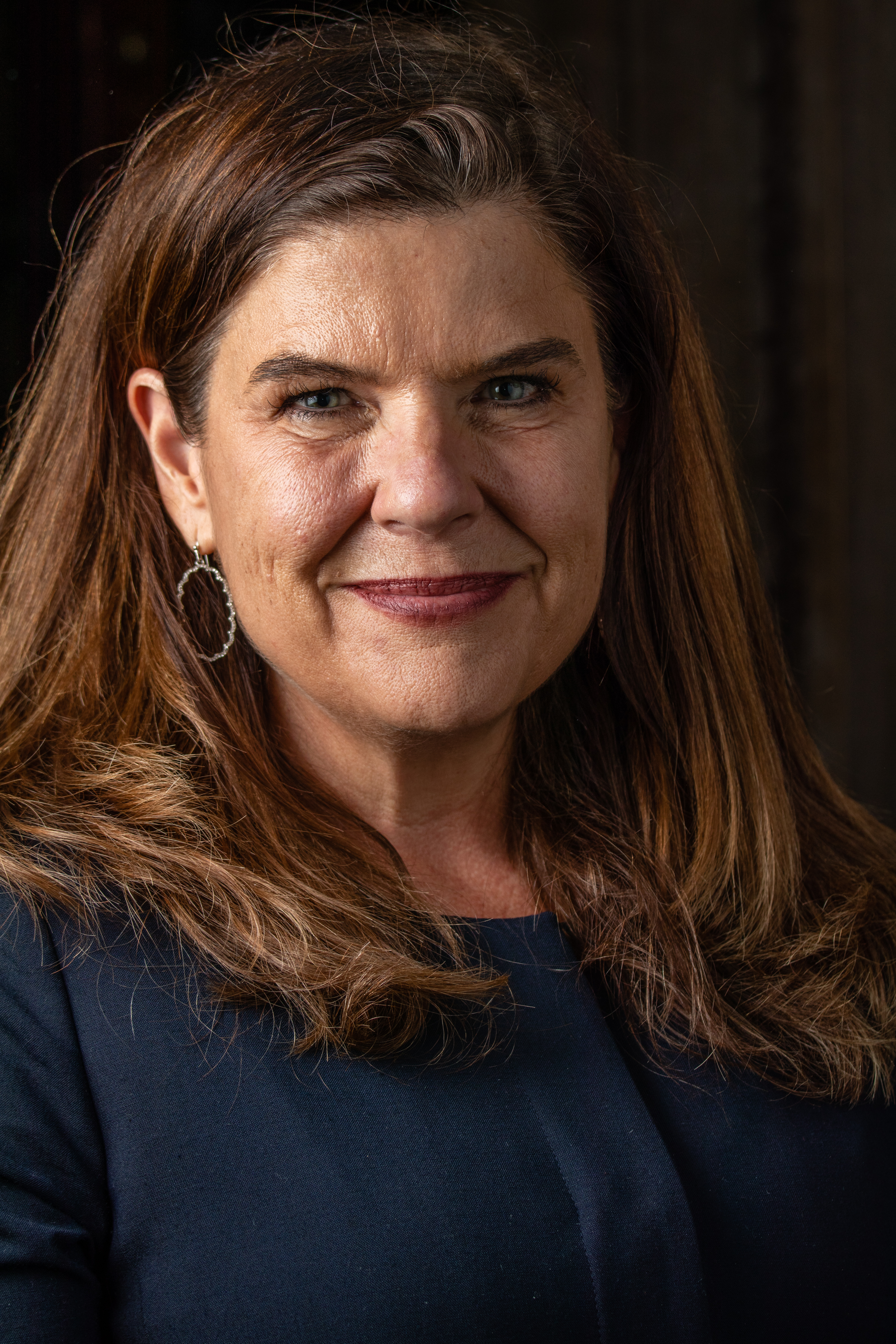
- Born: October 20, 1967 (age 58); Longview, Texas
- Education: Arizona State University; Georgetown University
- Occupations: Journalist, editor
- Spouse: Bradley P. Hartman

Nicole Carroll (born 1967) is an American journalist. She was the editor-in-chief of USA Today in the United States and President of Gannett's news division.

== Early life ==
Carroll was born in 1967 in Longview, Texas. She grew up in Canyon, Texas. Carroll graduated from the Arizona State University Walter Cronkite School of Journalism and Mass Communication in 1991, and she earned her master's degree from Georgetown University in 1996.

In 2008, Carroll was inducted into the Walter Cronkite School of Journalism and Mass Communication Alumni Hall of Fame.

== Career ==
Carroll began her career by working for El Paso Times and the East Valley Tribune. She worked for The Arizona Republic from 1999 to 2018, first as an editor, and as vice president of news and the editor from 2015 to 2018. At the Republic, Carroll led a project about the then-proposed expansion of the USA-Mexico border wall; the project won the 2018 Pulitzer Prize in Explanatory Reporting. Her Republic teams were twice named a Pulitzer finalist (2012, 2014) in Breaking News.

Carroll was awarded the Benjamin C. Bradlee Editor of the Year award from the National Press Foundation in 2017.

In 2018, Carroll became a member of the Pulitzer Prize board. The 19-member Pulitzer Board comprises mainly leading journalists or news executives from media outlets across the U.S., as well as five academics or persons in the arts.

Carroll succeeded Joanne Lipman as the editor-in-chief of USA Today in February 2018.

Carroll is a member of the Pulitzer Prize Board, which presides over the judging process that results in Pulitzer Prize winners and finalists.

=== Yearbook controversy ===
Carroll was editor-in-chief of the 1989 Arizona State University yearbook. In the yearbook was a photograph of two people in black face dressed as celebrities at a Halloween party. Carroll was credited with page layout for the photographs. Carroll has apologized for her role in publishing the photo spread, describing herself shocked when learning of "my role in publishing a racist and harmful photo in my college yearbook."

== Personal life ==
Carroll has three children with her husband, attorney Bradley Hartman.
