= Laurie Notaro =

American writer

- Born: October 1965 (age 60); Brooklyn, New York
- Education: Arizona State University
- Occupation: Author
- Notable work: Excuse Me While I Disappear

Laurie Notaro (born October 1965) is an American writer and a #1 New York Times bestselling author. She authored a number of New York Times best-selling books, including The Idiot Girls’ Action-Adventure Club, Excuse Me While I Disappear, and Housebroken.

== Career ==
She co-founded Planet Magazine, and was a senior editor at Tucson Monthly, a monthly city magazine. Notaro was a columnist for ten years at The Arizona Republic. In October 2001, her book The Idiot Girls’ Action Adventure Club was picked up by Random House. She published with Simon & Schuster with Crossing the Horizon and Potty Mouth at the Table. Her latest book, Excuse Me While I Disappear, is published by Little A and is a collection of musings on a Gen X-er becoming an AARP-er. Numerous articles, essays, and novels have followed, and she was a finalist for The Thurber Award for American Humor. She has written for The New York Times, Glamour, Oprah, BARK Magazine, USA Today, Village Voice Media, and BUST.

== Personal life ==
Notaro was raised in Phoenix, Arizona. She graduated from Arizona State University with a degree in journalism. She currently lives in Eugene, Oregon with her husband.

== Works ==
=== Novels ===
- There's a (Slight) Chance I Might Be Going to Hell: A Novel of Sewer Pipes, Pageant Queens, and Big Trouble (May 29, 2007)
- Spooky Little Girl (April 13, 2010)
- Crossing the Horizon (October 4, 2016)
- The Murderess (October 16, 2024)

=== Essay collections ===
- The Idiot Girls' Action-Adventure Club: True Tales from a Magnificent and Clumsy Life (July 2, 2002)
- Autobiography of a Fat Bride: True Tales of a Pretend Adulthood (July 8, 2003)
- I Love Everybody (and Other Atrocious Lies): True Tales of a Loudmouth Girl (June 8, 2004)
- We Thought You Would Be Prettier: True Tales of the Dorkiest Girl Alive (April 19, 2005)
- An Idiot Girl's Christmas: True Tales from the Top of the Naughty List (November 1, 2005)
- The Idiot Girl and the Flaming Tantrum of Death: Reflections on Revenge, Germophobia, and Laser Hair Removal (June 24, 2008)
- It Looked Different on the Model: Epic Tales of Impending Shame and Infamy (July 26, 2011)
- The Potty Mouth at the Table (May 7, 2013)
- Enter Pirates: Vintage Legends 1991-1999 (August 2015)
- Housebroken (July 2016)
- Predictably Disastrous Results: Vintage Legends Volume II (August 2016)
- Excuse Me While I Disappear (November 2022)
- I Have A New Complaint (June 2026)
