= Tania Katan =

American dramatist

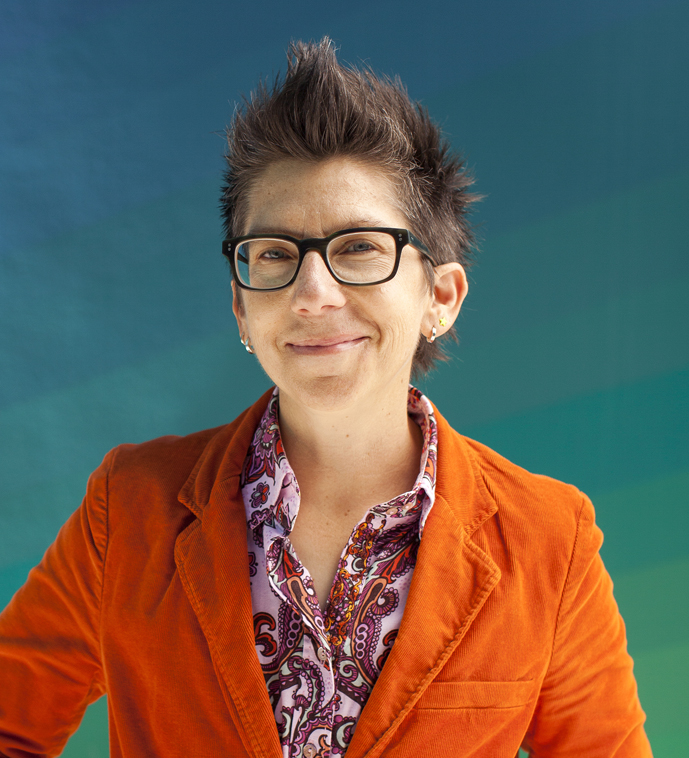
- Education: Arizona State University
- Occupations: Author, Inspirational Speaker, Career Creativity Expert
- Notable work: Creative Trespassing: How to Put Spark and Joy Back into Your Work and Life (Penguin Random House, Feb 2019), My One-Night Stand With Cancer: A Memoir, #ItWasNeverADress: Campaign
- Partner: Angela Ellsworth (m. 2002; div. 2026)
- Awards: Stonewall Book Award, Publishing Triangle Award, and Lambda Literary Award
- Website: http://www.taniakatan.com/

Tania Katan is an American author, public speaker, playwright, and creativity expert. Known around the world as a keynote speaker, Katan teaches people and companies to generate imaginative innovations and breakthroughs. Some of the organizations and conferences impacted by her talks include: CiscoLive!, Expedia, Amazon, Google, Business of Software, S.H.E. Summit, Humana, TEDxScottsdale, TEDxNCSSM, World Domination Summit, Uber, Etsy, Inbound, and Comedy Central Stage. In the tech world, Katan is known as the Co-Creator of #ItWasNeverADress, a social movement that has inspired over 50 million people worldwide to see, hear and celebrate women. The #ItWasNeverADress campaign strives to shift perceptions of women in male-dominated fields.

Katan's battle with cancer led her to write for the cancer-awareness initiative Stand Up to Cancer and to publish her first memoir My One-Night Stand With Cancer. She adapted the memoir into a one-woman show, Saving Tania's Privates. Katan's works have been presented internationally and won several awards.

== Writing ==
=== Books ===
After more than 10 years of bringing creativity into the workplace in unexpected and often liberating ways, Tania Katan made a startling discovery, "We don't need to work in a job or field that is uniquely creative in order to be uniquely creative within our work." This discovery compelled her to write, "Creative Trespassing: How to Put the Spark and Joy Back into Your Work and Life," published by Penguin Random House, February 2019. The book focuses on Katan's philosophy of "Creative Trespassing", showing how thinking outside the box can impact every part of a workday routine and result in extraordinary and exciting projects.

Tania Katan has been treated for breast cancer twice: at age 21, and at age 31. As a result of her experiences, she has become an advocate for breast cancer awareness, and has written a memoir and a play about breast cancer. Her first memoir, My One-Night Stand With Cancer, received the Stonewall Book Award, the Judy Grahn Award for Nonfiction from the Publishing Triangle, and a finalist for the Lambda Literary Award.

Katan published a micro-memoir, Pop (Childhood 6 of 1) in 2015. Her writing can also be found in publications such as The Huffington Post, The Advocate, and Stand Up to Cancer's website.

=== Plays ===
While studying theatre at Arizona State University, Katan wrote her first play Stages. It was produced at University of Connecticut and received staged readings at American Stage Theatre Company and Circle Repertory. Stages met with positive reviews.

She adapted her first memoir, My One-Night Stand With Cancer, into a solo-show, Saving Tania's Privates. The show made its New York debut at Frigid New York Festival in 2011 where it won the Audience Choice Award for Best Show and the Sold Out Run Award.

Katan's plays and solo-performance have also appeared at the Edinburgh Festival Fringe, Circle Repertory Theatre Theatre of NOTE, and the Renberg Theatre. Her work has gained national recognition. Publications such as New York Times, Huffington Post, DIVA Magazine, The Scotsman, The Advocate have all written about her work.

=== Programs ===
Katan has created and produced programs at the Scottsdale Museum of Contemporary Art, including Arm Wrestling For Art and Lit Lounge.

== #ItWasNeverADress Campaign ==
External videos
- "Tania Katan - It Was Never a Dress: The Power of a Poetic Leap of Faith!", TEDx
- "Tania Katan - The Power of Voice: Survivability, Sustainability and Nudity", TEDxScottsdale

Tania Katan is one of the co-creators for #ItWasNeverADress. This campaign is focused on addressing gender inequality in the technology industry and beyond. The Scottsdale-based software company Axosoft is doing away with the age-old symbol of a generic lady in a dress, as seen on women's bathroom's, and instead replacing the "triangle dress" with a superhero cape. Katan first came up with the idea as a part of an inaugural Girls In Tech Catalyst Conference in Phoenix, Arizona. Katan was asked to create an empowering campaign for women in tech, which led to her new take on the traditional female symbol. #ItWasNeverADress hopes to spark conversations about gender norms, not only by encouraging women to be more involved in STEM fields, but also by raising important points about representation of the LGBT community. This campaign became an Internet sensation, picked up by national news outlets such as CNN, The New York Times, TIME magazine and Yahoo!
