= Faith Hibbs-Clark =

British Casting director and Acting coach

- Born: Faith Hibbs-Clark
- Occupations: Casting director Acting coach

Faith Hibbs-Clark is a casting director and acting coach. As a casting director, she is known for her work on Jarhead, Piranha and Santa Fake.

She is recognized for her work using acting science, a methodology called The Communication Method for Actors," which is often referred to as the acting science method.

Hibbs-Clark also coached Quinton Aaron and learned Entertainment Lie method from her.

With a degree from Arizona State University, she worked as a body language deception detection expert in the mid-1990s before becoming a casting director for film and television in 1999. She started her own casting company called Good Faith Casting.
