= Patrick Jennings (writer) =

American novelist (born 1962)

Patrick Jennings (born February 25, 1962) is an American writer of children's books including picture books, middle-grade fiction, young adult fiction, and short stories. Animals, including pets, often figure in his stories. He is perhaps best known for his series, Guinea Dog, about Fido, a guinea pig that acts like a dog. He has also written humor pieces for Horn Book magazine's Cadenza column, including "Excerpt from the Chocolate Game", which mashes Suzanne Collins's The Hunger Games with Roald Dahl's Charlie & the Chocolate Factory.

Jennings was born in Indiana and moved as a teenager to Arizona, where he attended Arizona State University. He taught preschool in the United States and Mexico and also worked for Arizona's oldest public library. He has lived and worked in Port Townsend, Washington, since 2001.

== Books ==
- Naughty Claudine (Random House, 2017)
- Hissy Fitz (Egmont USA, 2015)
- Guinea Dog 3 (Egmont USA, 2014)
- Odd, Weird, & Little (Egmont USA, 2014)
- Guinea Dog 2 (Egmont USA, September 2013)
- My Homework Ate My Homework (Egmont USA, 2013)
- Invasion of the Dognappers (Egmont USA, 2012); retitled Dognap for paperback edition, 2013
- Bat & Rat (Abrams, 2012)
- Lucky Cap (Egmont USA, 2011)
- Guinea Dog (Egmont USA, 2010)
- We Can’t All Be Rattlesnakes (HarperCollins, 2009)
- Barb & Dingbat's Crybaby Hotline (Holiday House, 2007)
- Wish Riders (Hyperion, 2006)
- Out Standing in My Field (Scholastic Press, 2005)
- The Wolving Time (Scholastic Press, 2003)
- The Ears of Corn: an Ike and Mem Story (Holiday House, 2003)
- The Lightning Bugs: an Ike and Mem Story (Holiday House, 2003)
- Weeping Willow: an Ike and Mem Story (Holiday House, 2002)
- The Tornado Watches: an Ike and Mem Story (Holiday House, 2001)
- The Bird Shadow: an Ike and Mem Story (Holiday House, 2001)
- The Beastly Arms (Scholastic Press, 2001)
- Putnam & Pennyroyal (Scholastic Press, 1999)
- Faith and the Rocket Cat (Scholastic Press, 1998)
- Faith and the Electric Dogs (Scholastic Press, 1996)
