= Kristin Espinasse =

American-born author and photographer

- Born: December 22, 1968 (age 57); United States
- Education: Arizona State University
- Occupations: Author, photographer
- Known for: French Word-a-Day weblog and newsletter
- Notable work: Words in a French Life: Lessons in Love and Language from the South of France; French Word-A-Day Summer 2009 Stories
- Spouse: Jean-Marc Espinasse
- Children: 2

Kristin Espinasse (December 22, 1968) is an American-born author and photographer. She is the author of the book Words in a French Life: Lessons in Love and Language from the South of France. She is also the creator and editor of the thrice-weekly French Word-a-Day weblog and its accompanying newsletter. She also publishes cinema verite, a weekly photography showcase that features photographs from France and other countries. Her most recent book, French Word-A-Day Summer 2009 Stories, was published on December 1, 2009.

== Personal life ==
Kristin Espinasse was born in the southwestern USA and completed a liberal arts degree at Arizona State University. She met her husband Jean-Marc in Aix-en-Provence while on an exchange program in France. She moved to France in 1992. Her mother Jules lives in Mexico. She lives with her French husband and their two children near Orange, France.
