= Daniel Tibbets =

American media executive (born 1969)

- Born: Middletown, CT
- Education: Arizona State University
- Occupation: Media executive
- Employers: El Rey Network; Smosh

Daniel E. Tibbets (born July 9, 1969) is an American businessman. He is currently chief operating officer of Gray Matters Digital, Inc. and was the co-developer of Rome, an Emmy Award-Winning television series that aired on HBO from 2005 to 2007. His work at high-profile entertainment companies, content platforms, and digital agencies has focused on content creation and distribution, with an emphasis on the optimization of emerging technologies to bring his company's content to a wider global audience.

== Career ==
Daniel Tibbets is recognized for his work with content development and distribution, publishing, programming strategy, and emerging technologies that elevate the work of entertainment companies.

=== Gray Matter Digital, Inc. ===
Tibbets is currently chief operating officer of Grey Matters Digital, Inc., a digital media and gaming company founded by television producers, Jim Casey and Alan Winters.

=== Mint Comedy ===
In 2024, Tibbets was named chief executive officer of Mint Comedy, a digital subscription platform that offers livestreamed stand-up comedy shows from clubs in New York City and around the country. In his role as CEO, Tibbets focused on growing the platform's subscriber base, and capitalize on the recent rise in popularity of live stand-up comedy and other live content.

=== El Rey Network ===
From 2016 to 2020, Tibbets was president and General Manager of the El Rey Network, which was founded by director Robert Rodriguez. “In addition to being a destination for exciting and action-packed content, El Rey has also become synonymous with iconic programming that better reflects the diverse face of America,” Rodriguez noted when the network launched on Dish Network in 2015. During his time at El Rey, Tibbets led the media brand's move from cable channel to FAST channel, making it available to a much larger viewer base.

He was also Executive Producer on several of El Rey's most popular and critically acclaimed shows, including: Rebel Without A Crew: The Series, Explosion Jones (Original Animated Series), Hood River, Lucha Underground, Vampiro Unleashed, Correctamundo, and United Tacos of America.

=== Machinima ===
At Machinima, Tibbets took on the role of chief content officer, helping shepherd several of the brand's top shows, including winner of multiple Daytime Emmy Awards in 2013 and 2014, animated series Transformers: Prime Wars (Trilogy) [6], and also Happy Wheels, Bacca Chronicles, and Chasing the Cup (CW) – all as Executive Producer.

Machinima was acquired by Warner Bros in 2016.

=== Rome (HBO TV Series) ===
Tibbets was involved in developing and selling the HBO series Rome, which was created by John Milius, William J. MacDonald and Bruno Heller and aired from 2005 to 2007.

=== Smosh ===
In 2021 Tibbets became the first chief executive officer in the history of Smosh, YouTube's most watched comedy sketch brand, whose audience numbers over 45 million subscribers and 10 billion lifetime views on that platform. Tibbets reported to Rhett & Link, owners of Mythical Entertainment and principal shareholders of Smosh. Responsible for the nurturing and development of talent while at the company, Tibbets would help grow the careers of notable members of the “Smosh Family” including Chance McCrary, Arasha Lalani, Angela Giarratana.

In 2022, Tibbets was also one of the key architects behind a partnership between Smosh and G4 - the network dedicated to video games and the gaming lifestyle. Smosh syndicated their content on G4, attracting new audiences and expanding the reach of their IP. Tibbets also spearheaded Smosh's move into live streaming specials through its partner Kiswe.

=== Bunim/Murray ===
In 2011, Tibbets was named Senior Vice President of Digital Media for The Real World creator Bunim/Murray Productions, and subsequently led the pioneering unscripted television company's digital department - developing short-form programming for the web, mobile devices and other online and connected device distribution platforms. This included Oxygrams - original content for Oxygen Network Digital shows Bad Girls Club, and Best Ink.

Tibbets also produced and developed several other shows for Bunim/Murray during his run at the company, including: BRKDWN / Red Haw’t Gossip - 600+ original episodes, LookBook – 46 episodes, Best Ink Redemption People Luxe - People.com, SOS: Stylist On Set.

=== GoTV ===
In 2005, Tibbets became Executive Vice President and Studio Chief at GoTV, and in the process helped usher in the future of mobile digital entertainment with the creation of first-of-its-kind, made-for-mobile content, and via partnerships with Verizon and other leading carriers.

Tibbets spoke of his vision for the entertainment industry during a 2006 interview with The Hollywood Reporter, “Everyone will have the capability of watching video on his or her mobile device - so they can watch what they want, where they want and when they want. That will be a reality in 10 years.” The September 26, 2006 issue also included Tibbets in its “Future of Entertainment” feature, where Tibbets was named an industry professional to watch as the move to digital gathered momentum.

Notable content Tibbets developed for GoTV and Verizon included: The Michael Jackson Memorial, Live Broadcast, AEG (Executive Producer), Taylor Swift – Fearless Live, Concert Coverage (Executive Producer), Verizon’s NHL All Star Week (Development / Executive Producer), CMT Awards - Red Carpet, Live Broadcast (Executive Producer) Austin City Limits, Live Concert Event, AEG (Executive Producer), Primed - original reality show for mobile (Development / Executive Producer).

GoTV was acquired was acquired by Phunware in June, 2011.

=== FoxLab ===
From 2002 to 2005, Tibbets was head of FOXLAB, Inc. - one of only three people to ever hold that title - and was concurrently Vice President or Production at Twentieth Television 2002 – 2005. While at Fox, developed innovative projects for television, including Classmates with Classmates.com - the first convergence program to air on broadcast television. He is credited with the development of the first two original content “Mobisodes” - Love & Hate (Executive Producer), and The Sunset Hotel (Development / Executive Producer) - the first U.S. direct-to-mobile original soap operas.

=== CBS Enterprises ===
In 1995, Tibbets began his career as an entertainment executive at CBS Enterprises - working in development as a producer and contributor on award-winning, made for syndication series, including: Martha Stewart Living, Bob Vila, PSI Factor: Chronicles of the Paranormal (starring Dan Akroyd), Pensacola: Wings of Gold (starring James Brolin),

News for Kids, Wild, Wild Web, and The George Michael Sports Machine.

=== Premier Digital Publishing ===
As Co-founder and Principal, Tibbets was responsible for securing authors for past and new works through existing relationships in the industry. Tibbets secured a stable of high-profile authors that included: Piers Anthony, the Estate of Stephen Ambrose, Alan Jacobson, Andre Norton, and Robert Graysmith. Premier Digital Publishing was acquired by Open Road Media in 2014.

== Personal life ==
Tibbets was born in Middletown, CT and attended Arizona State University in Tempe, Arizona. He is married to writer, producer, and literary agent Anne Tibbets. The couple currently resides in Southern California.
