= Camille Patha =

American painter and sculptor (1938–2024)

Camille Patha (April 23, 1938 – December 19, 2023) was an American painter and sculptor.

She was born in Seattle in 1938 and studied art at the University of Washington. Her abstract paintings were noted for their bold colour; Patha regarded herself as a "colorist" rather than an abstract artist.

Patha died on December 19, 2023.

== Sources ==
- Kangas, Matthew (2006) "Camille Patha, Geography of Desire" https://www.camillepatha.com/bio.html
- "Camille Patha Delivers Punch of Color to Tam", TAM (Tacoma Art Museum). Web. 14 Jan. 2014 http://www.tacomaartmuseum.org/camille-patha-delivers-punch-color-tam/
- "Camille Patha" https://art.state.gov/personnel/camille_patha/
