= David T. Kessler =

American artist (born 1950)

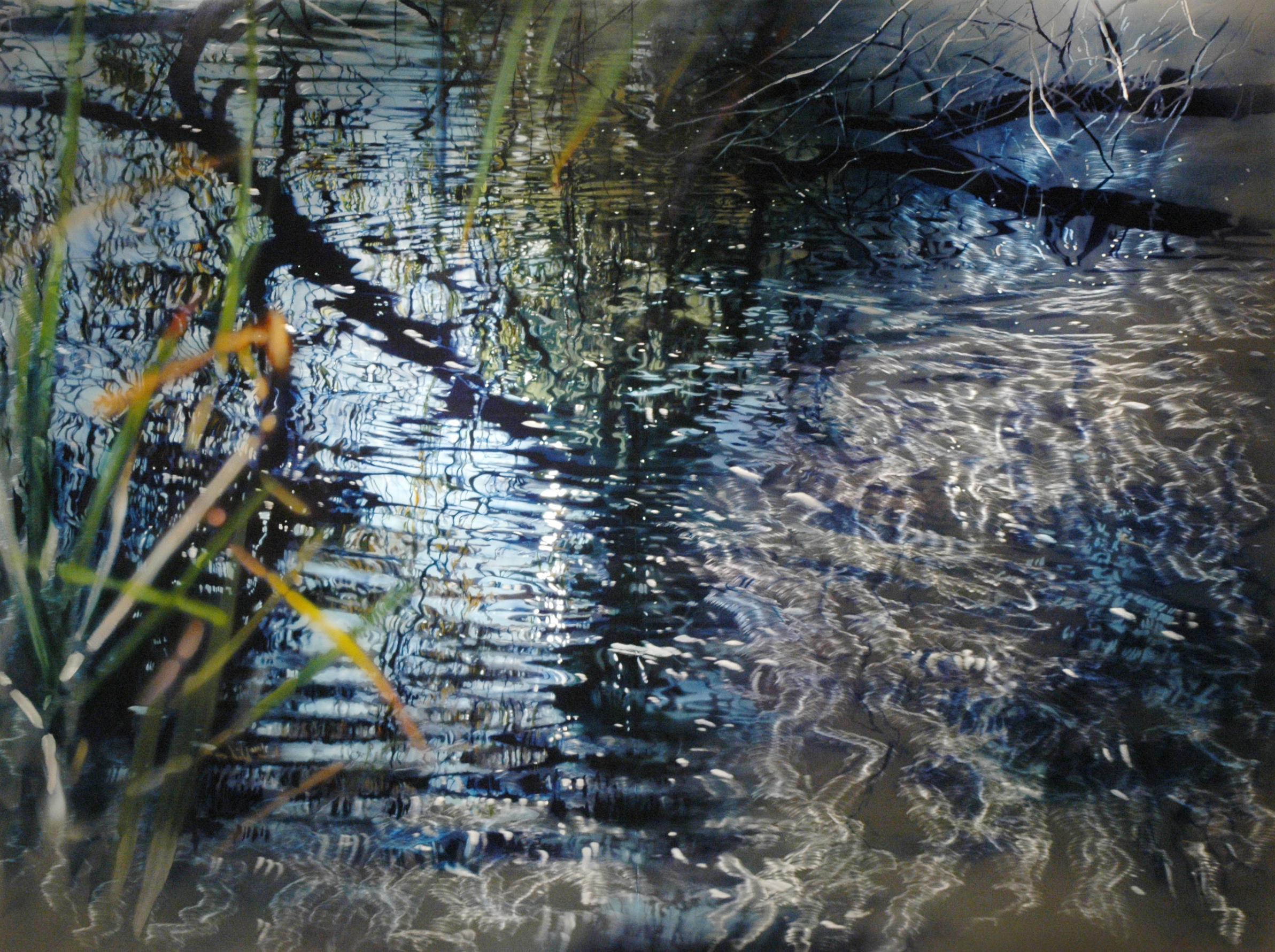
Veiled Cadence, 6' x 8' acrylic paint on abraded aluminum

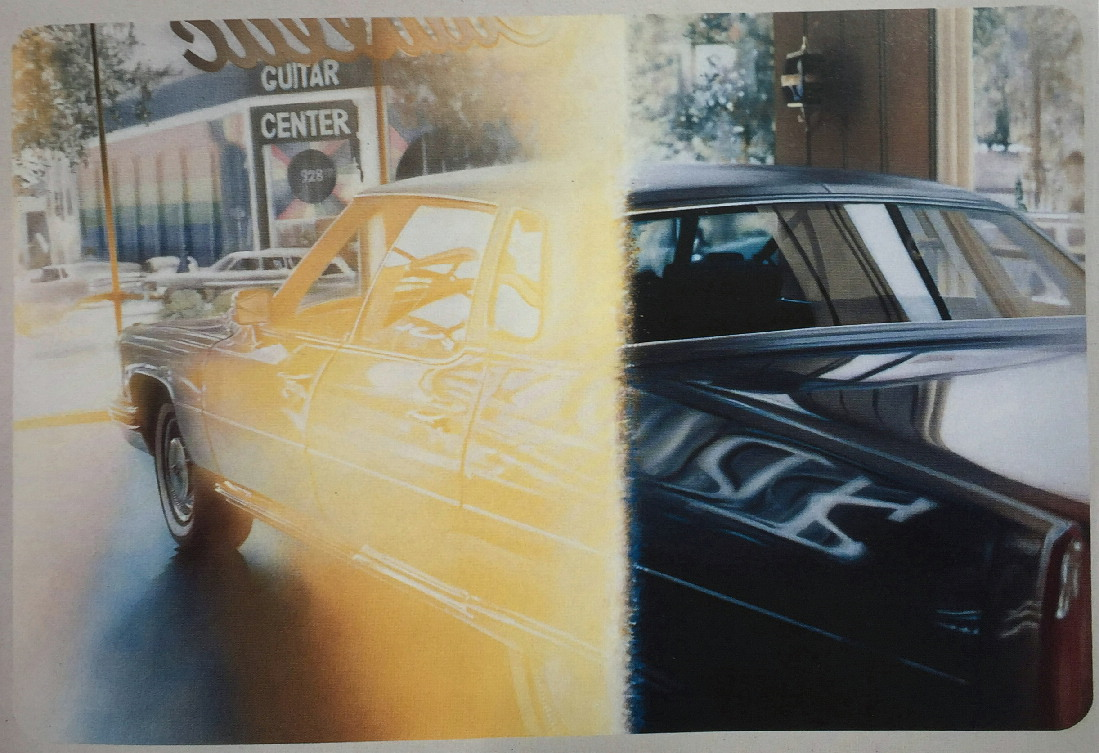
Light-Struck Cadillac, acrylic on canvas, 5' x 7' from Ruined Slide series From the collection of the Strasbourg Museum of Contemporary Art

David T. Kessler (born 1950 in Park Ridge, New Jersey) is an American artist primarily known for his photo-realist paintings. Although he is a longtime resident of Phoenix, Arizona, Kessler launched his career in San Francisco in the mid 1970s, at a time when a significant school of photo-realism was emerging in the Bay Area.

== Education ==
Kessler received a Bachelor of Fine Arts degree from Arizona State University in 1972. There, he studied with artists Rip Woods, Art Jacobsen, and Muriel Magenta, among others. In 1973 he moved to northern California to attend the MFA program of the world renowned San Francisco Art Institute.

== Artistic experiments and career ==
Not long after graduating from the San Francisco Art Institute in 1975, Kessler gained significant attention for his photo-realist paintings, specifically a body of work known as the "Ruined Slide Series." Using damaged slides (often of family photographs or ordinary images) as the basis for airbrushed compositions, he was able to maintain the aesthetic principles of photo-realism while relying on the aberrations of the slides, such as light streaks or overexposed areas, in order to incorporate elements of abstraction into his paintings. Writing in the 1980 publication Super Realist Painting & Sculpture, art historian Christine Lindey argues that Kessler's Ruined Slide Series distinguished him from other photo-realists given that "he is not concerned with the associations which photographs conjure up, nor with using them to attain distance or dislocation of context, but deals with the distortions of reality created by photographic mistakes." Writing in Art in America, critic David Tannous described the Ruined Slide Series as dealing simultaneously with "two different levels of reality: that of a 'ruined' photographic slide...and that of the 'actual scene' depicted by the slide." Tannous's favorable review of his 1977 solo exhibition at Gallery 4 in Alexandria, Virginia, expanded Kessler's audience beyond the Southwest, catapulting his career. The Ruined Slide Series was shown in a number of venues across the United States, and later in the 2003 exhibition "Hyperrealismes USA 1965-1975" at the Strasbourg Museum of Contemporary Art in France, which featured works by Chuck Close, Malcolm Morley, and Audrey Flack as well. A review of Hyperrealismes USA 1965-1975 in Art in America identified Kessler's Light Struck Cadillac (1976–77), which shows an overexposed image of a car in a showroom, as a "gentle parody of the worshipful car paintings of John Salt, Don Eddy, and Robert Bechtle," who were also included in the show.

In the 1980s Kessler continued to explore the formal aspects of photo-realism by experimenting with the illusionism of Renaissance painting, i.e. a scene depicted as though the canvas were a picture window, and modern concepts of space in which the surface of the canvas is the main focus. This led him to experiment with Plexiglass and the types of illusions that are created when a landscape appears through the "window" of a painted sheet of clear plastic. Painting abstract dashes on clear panels then placing them in front of landscapes, which he photographed and then painted on canvas, added a surreal quality to his realistic compositions. For Kessler, this technique allowed him to "go one step further" than the historic experiments in perception that resulted from the emergence of photo-realism a decade earlier. The abstract images on Plexiglass "create tension in the painting. The result is distracting without being unattractive," Kessler told the Arizona Republic in a 1981 interview.

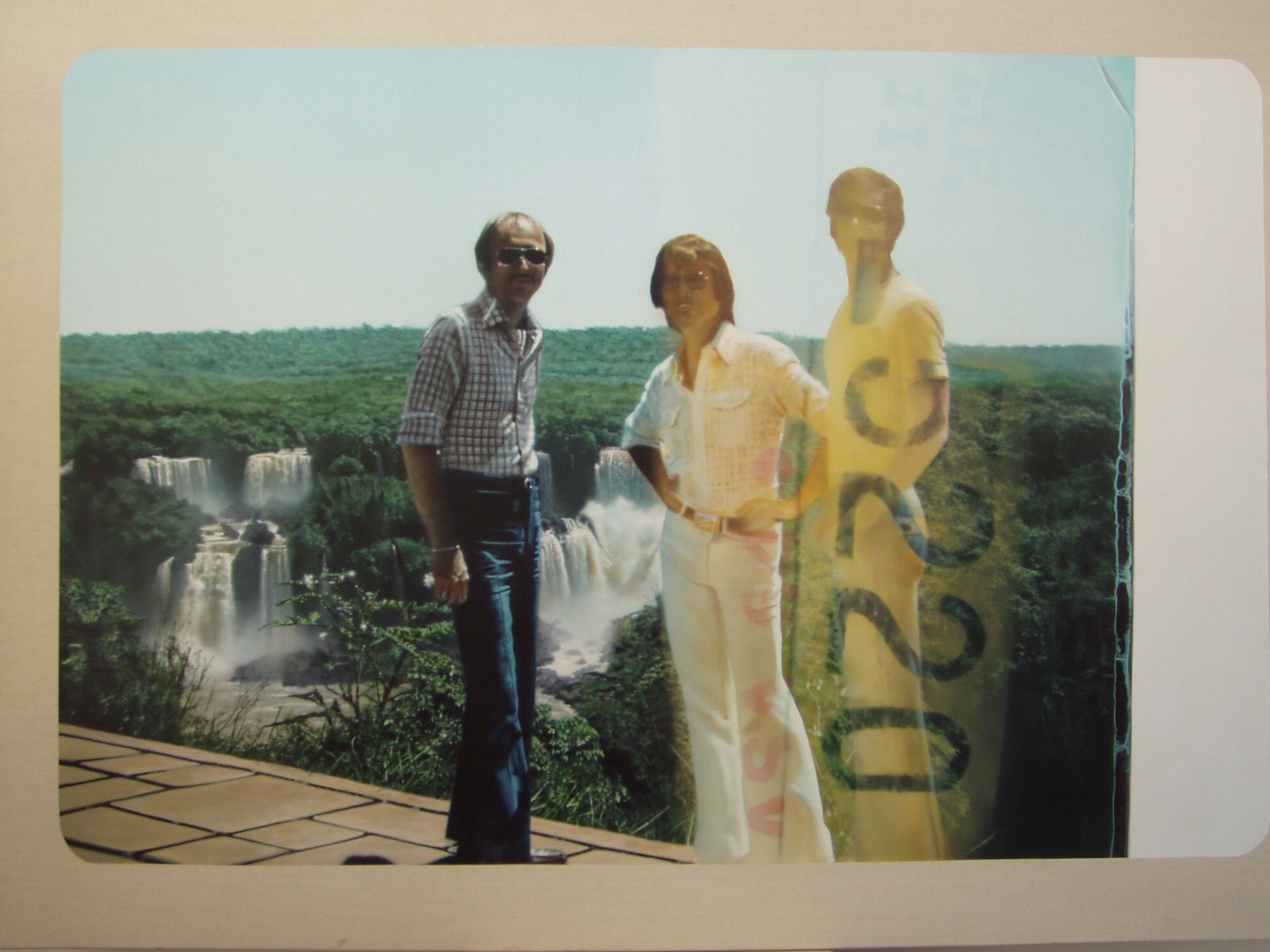
Jim, Weyman, Peter, End of Roll Vacation Slide from the Ruined Slide series

Kessler began experimenting with painting on metal during the 1990s. Focusing on scenes that are taken from close-up photographs of water surfaces, illusions of movement result from a combination of refracted light on the painting's metal surface, which is created using high-speed grinders, and then partially painted. Kessler's first solo exhibition with New York's OK Harris Gallery, "Waterscapes: Paintings on Metal" featured nearly a dozen of these works.

Since the early 1980s, Kessler has regularly exhibited his paintings and drawings in American museums including the Tucson Museum of Art (1982, 2005, 2013), Sedona Art Museum (1983), Tucson Museum of Contemporary Art (1986, 2002), Art Museum of South Texas (1988), The Rockwell Museum, (1987), Arizona State University Art Museum (1993), South Bend Regional Museum of Art (1994), Loyola University Museum of Art, Chicago (2006), Phoenix Art Museum (2014), and Marietta/Cobb Museum of Art (2015).

== Public Collections ==
- Strasbourg Museum of Contemporary Art, France
- Brooklyn Museum of Art, USA
- Minnesota Museum of American Art, USA
- Phoenix Art Museum, USA
- Tucson Museum of Art, USA
- Northern Arizona University Art Museum, USA
- Scottsdale Center for the Arts, USA
- Monterey Museum of Art, USA
- Euphrat Museum of Art, De Anza College, USA
- Achenbach Foundation, USA
- Crocker Art Museum, USA
- Arizona State University Art Museum, USA
- Barrington Art Center, USA
- Portsmouth Community College Arts Center, USA
- Davidson College, USA
- Santa Barbara Museum of Art, USA
