= Doug Hopkins =

American musician (1961–1993)

- Hopkins c. 1992

Background information
- Born: Douglas Owen Hopkins; April 11, 1961; Seattle, Washington, U.S.
- Died: December 5, 1993 (aged 32) Tempe, Arizona, U.S.
- Genres: Pop rock, alternative rock
- Instruments: Guitar, bass guitar
- Years active: 1981–1993
- Formerly of: Gin Blossoms, The Chimeras, The Psalms

Douglas Owen Hopkins (April 11, 1961 – December 5, 1993) was an American musician and songwriter. He co-founded Gin Blossoms, a popular modern rock band of the early 1990s. He was the band's lead guitarist and principal songwriter. Hopkins' writing credits included the hits "Hey Jealousy" and "Found Out About You".

Due to his alcoholism, Hopkins was dismissed from Gin Blossoms just before the band broke into the mainstream. His dismissal was controversial, however, and it only worsened his alcoholism and mental health issues. Hopkins died in December 1993 from a self-inflicted gunshot wound at the age of 32.

== History ==
=== Early life and education ===
Hopkins was born in Seattle, Washington, and raised in Tempe, Arizona. He graduated from Tempe's McClintock High School in 1979, and two years later, while attending Arizona State University, formed his first rock band with Bill Leen (The Psalms). Hopkins was the guitarist and Leen the bassist, although neither knew how to play the instruments. Hopkins graduated from Arizona State in 1985, with a degree in sociology.

=== Career ===
In 1987, Hopkins (lead guitar) and Leen (bass) formed Gin Blossoms alongside Richard Taylor on rhythm guitar, Chris McCann on drums, and Jesse Valenzuela on vocals. After a few lineup changes, by the following year, the lineup was settled when Valenzuela switched to rhythm guitar, Robin Wilson joined as vocalist, and Phillip Rhodes joined as drummer. Hopkins was the band's primary songwriter, both musically and lyrically (although other members occasionally contributed as well). The band released their debut album, Dusted, in 1989 on the independent label San Jacinto.

Hopkins had suffered from chronic depression since childhood and had been battling alcoholism for several years; however, in 1990, Gin Blossoms were one of the hottest local bands in Tempe and the surrounding areas, and they signed a contract with the major label A&M Records. Hopkins was resistant to signing to a major label, feeling it would mean loss of control over his creative decisions; thus, he reacted to the deal with stubbornness and more drinking. The band struggled during the recording sessions for their major label debut album, and as a result, they were only able to finish an EP, titled Up and Crumbling, in 1991.

Due to the moderate success of Up and Crumbling, A&M continued to push the band to record a full-length album. In February 1992, during the recording sessions for their full-length major label debut album New Miserable Experience, it was reported that Hopkins' drinking had hit a breaking point. He was unable to stand during his recording sessions, and his hands trembled to the point of being unable to play guitar. Faced with the prospect of firing Hopkins or being dropped by A&M, the band chose to terminate Hopkins. Doused in aftershave and mouthwash to cover the effects of his days-long drinking binge, he was flown back to Arizona.

Hopkins was replaced by Scott Johnson. The record label then withheld $15,000 (equivalent to $34,414 in 2025) owed to Hopkins until he agreed to sign over half of his publishing royalties. Hopkins was also required to relinquish his mechanical royalties to Johnson, his replacement. Hopkins reluctantly agreed to these demands because of his dire financial situation. Overall, it was reported that no one from the band or label offered any support to Hopkins' wellbeing. New Miserable Experience went on to become a multi-platinum album, though sales were initially slow.

After he returned to Tempe, Hopkins started another band, The Chimeras, with brothers Lawrence and Mark Zubia. Hopkins soon quit the band after a live performance went poorly. Shortly before his death, Hopkins appeared on stage with Dead Hot Workshop and Hans Olson in Tucson.

=== Death and legacy ===
Hopkins' health had worsened due to his drinking. Reportedly, his liver was damaged to the point of uncontrollable vomiting, and a doctor had warned him of the fatal consequences. As Gin Blossoms experienced mounting success performing songs he had written, Hopkins became increasingly despondent. The singles "Hey Jealousy" and "Found Out About You" gained national airplay, and the former was even certified gold by the RIAA. Although he had always dreamed of having a gold record, when he received one for "Hey Jealousy", he hung it up for two weeks before taking it down and then destroying it. Nine days later, after an intake consultation in the detox unit of Phoenix's St. Luke's Hospital, Hopkins purchased a .38 caliber pistol. He died of a self-inflicted gunshot wound the next day on December 5, 1993.

In 1994, Larry Rudolph of the New York firm of Rudolph & Beer, which represented the Hopkins estate, announced that eighteen songs were found and were open for a recording deal. Ultimately, Gin Blossoms' first few hit singles were penned by Hopkins. The title of Gin Blossoms' third full-length album in 1996, Congratulations...I'm Sorry, alluded to Hopkins' death. In addition, The Chimeras (a band that Hopkins briefly played in shortly before his death) eventually changed their name to The Pistoleros, and their only charting single in the US ("My Guardian Angel") was also written by Hopkins.

Circa 2000, award-winning documentarian Mark Stanoch secured the rights to Hopkins’ music and story for a biopic potentially starring Ethan Hawke, but plans got bogged down. A screenplay based on an article about Hopkins, Lost Horizons, was also created in 2020, although specific details were not yet confirmed.
