= Stanley Battese =

Navajo-American painter and printmaker

- Kehdoyah
- Born: January 29, 1936 (age 90); Fort Defiance, Arizona
- Citizenship: Diné, American
- Education: Arizona State University
- Occupation: painter

Stanley Battese (born 1936), also called Kehdoyah ("Follower" in Navajo), is a Navajo-American painter and printmaker born in Fort Defiance, Arizona. Primarily active in the 1950s and 1960s, he is known for his paintings and prints of animals and of Navajo figures. Battese has exhibited his work across the United States, including at the Inter-Tribal Indian Ceremonials, the Philbrook Museum of Art, and as part of the Museum of New Mexico's fine arts gallery tours.

== Early life and education ==
Battese was born to Navajo parents Charlie Smith and Gee Eh Bah. He was adopted by Anthony Battese (Potawatomi) and Josephine Bruner (Muscogee-Shawnee). Battese began painting at a young age. He studied at Window Rock and at Gallup, and was a student of Martha Kennedy. He went on to earn a Bachelor of Arts from Arizona State University in Tempe, Arizona, in 1961.

== Selected exhibitions ==
After exhibiting his art throughout the 1950s, including shows at the Renaissance Society, the Philbrook Art Center, among other venues. Battese appears to have painted less frequently. He worked for a time as a carpenter and a welder.

== Collections ==
His works are in private collections and in the collections of institutions including the Smithsonian National Museum of Natural History, the Semple Museum at Southeastern Oklahoma State University, Arizona State Museum, among others.

His work that was formerly in Acee Blue Eagle's private collection is now in the collection of the Smithsonian Institution National Museum of Natural History

The Smithsonian Institution National Museum of the American Indian holds an archive of newspaper and magazine clippings and reviews of his work, exhibition catalogues, brochures and announcements and artist statements and resumes on the artist.
