= Tony Carrillo (cartoonist) =

American cartoonist

Tony Carrillo is the creator of F Minus, an offbeat comic strip. Carrillo started the comic strip at Arizona State University, when he was in his sophomore year. After winning an online contest to determine the best college comic strip, Carrillo was awarded a deal with United Media. F Minus appears daily at GoComics, as well as many newspapers across the country.

== Personal life and career ==
Tony Carrillo was born and raised in Tempe, Arizona. Carrillo attended McClintock High School. He married his high school sweetheart Lindsey Butler. On April 17, 2006, his comic, F Minus, began nationwide syndication, and is currently in over 150 newspapers. In its first year of syndication, F Minus was nominated for a National Cartoonists Society division award: Best Newspaper Panel.

== References, external link ==
- About the Author, Comics.com (archived)
- F Minus official website
