= List of songs recorded by Pixies =

This is a comprehensive list of songs by the Pixies, an American alternative rock band. This list includes album tracks, B-sides, demos, live recordings and remixes of songs written by one or more of the band's members or songs covered by the band; it does not include songs that members of the Pixies wrote, recorded or performed with Frank Black and the Catholics, The Breeders, The Martinis, or any solo projects.

Key
†	Indicates song released as a single
‡	Indicates song not written or co-written by Black Francis

All songs written by Black Francis, except as noted.

Song	Original release	Writer(s)	Year	Notes
"Ain't That Pretty At All"	Enjoy Every Sandwich compilation	Warren Zevon ‡	2004	cover song
"Alec Eiffel" †	Trompe le Monde		1991	
"All I Think About Now"	Head Carrier	Black Francis, Paz Lenchantin	2016	
"All Over the World"	Bossanova		1990	
"All the Saints"	Head Carrier		2016	
"Allison"	Bossanova		1990	
"Ana"	Bossanova		1990	
"Andro Queen"	EP1		2013	
"Another Toe in the Ocean"	EP1		2013	
"Baal's Back"	Head Carrier		2016	
"Bagboy" †	EP3		2013	
"Bailey's Walk"	"Here Comes Your Man" B-side		1989	
"Bam Thwok" †	non-album single	Kim Deal ‡	2004	Reunion single released exclusively on the iTunes Music Store
"Been All Around The World"	Acoustic:Live In Newport	(Traditional) ‡	2006	based on the traditional "Hang Me, Oh Hang Me"
"Bel Esprit"	Head Carrier		2016	
"Bird Dream of the Olympus Mons"	Trompe le Monde		1991	
"Bird of Prey"	Beneath the Eyrie		2019	
"Blown Away"	Bossanova		1990	
"Blue Eyed Hexe"	EP2		2014	
"Bone Machine"	Surfer Rosa		1988	
"Born in Chicago"	Rubáiyát compilation	Nick Gravenites ‡	1990	Paul Butterfield Blues Band cover
"Break My Body"	Surfer Rosa		1988	
"Brick Is Red"	Surfer Rosa		1988	
"Broken Face"	Surfer Rosa		1988	
"Build High"	"Planet of Sound" B-side		1991	
"Cactus"	Surfer Rosa		1988	
"Caribou"	Come on Pilgrim		1987	
"Catfish Kate" †	Beneath the Eyrie		2019	
"Caught in a Dream"	Beneath the Eyrie - LP2		2019	
"Cecilia Ann"	Bossanova	Steve Hoffman ‡	1990	The Surftones cover
"Chapel Hill"	Beneath the Eyrie - LP2		2019	
"Chicken"	The Night the Zombies Came		2024	
"Classic Masher" †	Head Carrier		2016	
"Crackity Jones"	Doolittle		1989	
"Dancing the Manta Ray"	"Monkey Gone to Heaven" B-side		1989	
"Daniel Boone"	Beneath the Eyrie		2019	
"Dead"	Doolittle		1989	
"Death Horizon"	Beneath the Eyrie		2019	
"Debaser" †	Doolittle		1989	
"Dig for Fire" †	Bossanova		1990	
"Distance Equals Rate Times Time"	Trompe le Monde		1991	
"Doggerel"	Doggerel		2022	
"Down to the Well"	Bossanova		1990	
"Dregs of the Wine" †	Doggerel	Black Francis, Joey Santiago	2022	
"Ed Is Dead"	Come on Pilgrim		1987	
"Ernest Evans"	The Night the Zombies Came		2024	
"Evil Hearted You"	"Planet of Sound" B-side	Graham Gouldman ‡	1990	Yardbirds cover in Spanish
"Get Simulated"	Doggerel		2022	
"Gigantic" †	Surfer Rosa	Black Francis, Kim Deal	1988	
"The Good Works of Cyrus"	Beneath the Eyrie - LP2		2019	
"Gouge Away"	Doolittle		1989	
"Greens and Blues"	EP2		2014	
"Hang Wire"	Bossanova		1990	
"The Happening"	Bossanova		1990	
"Haunted House"	Doggerel		2022	
"Havalina"	Bossanova		1990	
"Head Carrier"	Head Carrier		2016	
"Head On" †	Trompe le Monde	Jim Reid, William Reid ‡	1992	The Jesus and Mary Chain cover
"Hear Me Out" †	non-album single		2020	
"Here Comes Your Man" †	Doolittle		1989	
"Hey"	Doolittle		1989	
"Hey, Debussy"	Beneath the Eyrie - LP2		2019	
"The Holiday Song"	Come on Pilgrim		1987	
"How I Learned to Earn Rewards"	Beneath the Eyrie - LP2		2019	
"Human Crime" †	non-album single		2022	
"Hypnotised"	The Night the Zombies Came	Black Francis, Joey Santiago	2024	
"I Bleed"	Doolittle		1989	
"I Can't Forget"	I'm Your Fan compilation	Leonard Cohen ‡	1991	cover song
"I Hear You Mary"	The Night the Zombies Came	Black Francis, Joey Santiago	2024	
"I Just Can't Break It to You"	Beneath the Eyrie - LP2		2019	
"I'm Amazed"	Surfer Rosa		1988	
"In Heaven (Lady in the Radiator Song)"	"Gigantic" B-side	Peter Ivers, David Lynch ‡	1988	written for the film Eraserhead
"In the Arms of Mrs. Mark of Caine"	Beneath the Eyrie		2019	
"Indie Cindy"	EP1		2013	
"Into The White"	"Here Comes Your Man" B-side		1989	
"Is She Weird"	Bossanova		1990	
"Isla de Encanta"	Come on Pilgrim		1987	
"I've Been Tired"	Come on Pilgrim		1987	
"I've Been Waiting For You"	"Velouria" B-side	Neil Young ‡	1990	cover song
"Jaime Bravo"	EP3		2014	
"Jane (The Night the Zombies Came)"	The Night the Zombies Came		2024	
"Johnny Good Man"	The Night the Zombies Came		2024	
"Kings of the Prairie"	The Night the Zombies Came		2024	
"La La Love You"	Doolittle		1989	
"Letter to Memphis" †	Trompe le Monde		1991	
"Levitate Me"	Come on Pilgrim	Black Francis, Kim Deal, David Lovering, Jean Walsh	1987	
"Long Rider"	Beneath the Eyrie	Black Francis, Paz Lenchantin	2019	
"The Lord Has Come Back Today"	Doggerel		2022	
"Los Surfers Muertos"	Beneath the Eyrie	Black Francis, Paz Lenchantin	2019	
"Lovely Day"	Trompe le Monde		1991	
"Magdalena 318"	EP2		2014	
"Make Believe"	"Velouria" B-side		1990	
"Mal De Mer"	Beneath the Eyrie - LP2		2019	
"Mambo Sun"	"Hear Me Out" B-side	Marc Bolan ‡	2020	T. Rex cover
"Manta Ray"	"Monkey Gone to Heaven" B-side		1989	
"Mercy Me"	The Night the Zombies Came		2024	
"Might As Well Be Gone"	Head Carrier		2016	
"Monkey Gone to Heaven" †	Doolittle		1989	
"Motoroller"	The Night the Zombies Came		2024	
"Motorway to Roswell"	Trompe le Monde		1991	
"Mr. Grieves"	Doolittle		1989	
"The Navajo Know"	Trompe le Monde		1991	
"Nimrod's Son"	Come on Pilgrim		1987	
"No. 13 Baby"	Doolittle		1989	
"Nomatterday"	Doggerel		2022	
"Oh My Golly!"	Surfer Rosa		1988	
"On Graveyard Hill" †	Beneath the Eyrie	Black Francis, Paz Lenchantin	2019	
"Oona"	Head Carrier		2016	
"Oyster Beds"	The Night the Zombies Came		2024	
"Pagan Man"	Doggerel	Black Francis, Joey Santiago	2022	
"Palace of the Brine"	Trompe le Monde		1991	
"Planet of Sound" †	Trompe le Monde		1991	
"Plaster of Paris"	Head Carrier		2016	
"Please, Don't Go"	Beneath the Eyrie - LP2		2019	
"Primrose"	The Night the Zombies Came		2024	
"Ready for Love"	Beneath the Eyrie		2019	
"Ring the Bell"	EP3		2014	
"River Euphrates"	Surfer Rosa		1988	
"Rock A My Soul"	Pixies		2002	
"Rock Music"	Bossanova		1990	
"The Sad Punk"	Trompe le Monde		1991	
"Santo"	"Dig for Fire" B-side		1990	
"Silver"	Doolittle	Black Francis, Kim Deal	1989	
"Silver Bullet"	Beneath the Eyrie		2019	
"Silver Snail"	EP3		2014	
"Snakes"	EP2		2014	
"Something Against You"	Surfer Rosa		1988	
"Space (I Believe In)"	Trompe le Monde		1991	
"St. Nazaire"	Beneath the Eyrie		2019	
"Stormy Weather"	Bossanova		1990	
"Subbacultcha"	Trompe le Monde		1991	
"Talent"	Head Carrier		2016	
"Tame"	Doolittle		1989	
"Tenement Song" †	Head Carrier		2016	
"Theme from Narc"	"Planet of Sound" B-side	Brian L. Schmidt ‡	1991	video game theme
"There Goes My Gun"	Doolittle		1989	
"There's a Moon On" †	Doggerel		2022	
"The Thing"	"Velouria" B-side		1990	part of Bossanova album track "The Happening"
"This is My Fate"	Beneath the Eyrie		2019	
"Thunder and Lightning"	Doggerel		2022	
"Tony's Theme"	Surfer Rosa		1988	
"Trompe le Monde"	Trompe le Monde		1991	
"Um Chagga Lagga" †	Head Carrier		2016	
"U-Mass"	Trompe le Monde		1991	
"Under the Marigold"	Beneath the Eyrie - LP2		2019	
"Vamos"	Come on Pilgrim		1987	Re-recorded for Surfer Rosa (1988)
"Vault of Heaven" †	Doggerel		2022	
"The Vegas Suite"	The Night the Zombies Came		2024	
"Velouria" †	Bossanova		1990	
"Velvety Instrumental Version"	"Dig for Fire" B-side		1990	
"Wave of Mutilation"	Doolittle		1989	
"Wave of Mutilation (UK Surf)"	"Here Comes Your Man" B-side		1989	
"Weird At My School"	"Monkey Gone to Heaven" B-side		1989	
"What Goes Boom"	EP1		2013	
"Where Is My Mind?"	Surfer Rosa		1988	
"Who's More Sorry Now?"	Doggerel		2022	
"Wild Honey Pie"	Pixies at the BBC	Lennon–McCartney ‡	1998	live version of The Beatles cover
"Winterlong"	The Bridge compilation	Neil Young ‡	1989	cover song
"Women of War"	Indie Cindy		2014	Single released on 7 inch vinyl record for free with Indie Cindy LPs on Record Store Day 2014
"You're So Impatient"	The Night the Zombies Came		2024	
"You're Such a Sadducee"	Doggerel		2022	
