= EP1 (Pixies EP) =

EP by Pixies
- Released: September 2, 2013
- Recorded: Late 2012
- Studios: Rockfield Studios, Wales additional recording at Sonelab, Easthampton the Autumn Den, Northampton
- Genre: Alternative rock
- Length: 15:23
- Producer: Gil Norton

Pixies chronology
| Minotaur (2009) | EP1 (2013) | EP2 (2014) |

EP1 is a 2013 EP by American alternative rock band Pixies. Apart from the 2004 single "Bam Thwok" and a cover of Warren Zevon's "Ain't That Pretty At All", this EP, along with the 2013 single "Bagboy", is the first new material from the band in more than 20 years. This is the first album they have released without founding member Kim Deal, who quit earlier in the year. It is the first in a series of releases planned through the band's web site and designed by Vaughan Oliver.

The Pixies were aware of how their legacy, as well as the departure of their longtime bassist Kim Deal, strengthened the weight surrounding a new release. Santiago said the band mourned for three days but decided to continue without Deal. The track "Indie Cindy" is about the band's hope that audiences will accept their new work after such a long hiatus. The song, according to Black Francis, says to the audience "I don’t know if you’ll accept me; I don’t know if I accept you. But we have this memory. Can we do it again?"

The E.P. is intended to be one of several released through the band's website rather than full albums on labels.

== Reception ==
Professional ratings
Aggregate scores
| Source | Rating |
|---|---|
| Metacritic | 45/100 |
Review scores
| Source | Rating |
| Consequence Of Sound | C− |
| Montreal Gazette | 3.5/5 stars |
| NME | 6/10 |
| Pitchfork | 1.0/10 |
| PopMatters | 5/10 stars |
| Punknews.org | 2.5/5 stars |
| Rolling Stone | 2.5/5 stars |
| Sputnikmusic | 2/5 |
| Under The Radar | 6/10 |

EP1 received mostly negative reviews from music critics. Jayson Greene of Pitchfork castigated the extended play, arguing there is "no Pixies in this Pixies" and giving it a rare score of 1.0. Ben Sisario of The New York Times called it "less screamy and uptight" but noted the overall dynamics of the band were still present. The track "Indie Cindy" in particular was praised for sounding reminiscent of the Pixies' earlier work; John Tryneski of PopMatters ranked it the strongest track, and Brett Buchanan of Alternative Nation also called it the standout for combining Francis' "trademark spoken word verses with a dreamy melodic chorus". Buchanan also praised "Bag Boy" and argued the band could survive without Kim Deal.

On October 7, the official video of "Andro Queen" was released.

On November 19, the official video for "What Goes Boom" was released and then on December 9, the official video for "Another Toe in the Ocean" was released on the group's new VEVO site.

== Track listing ==
1. "Andro Queen" – 3:24
2. "Another Toe in the Ocean" – 3:46
3. "Indie Cindy" – 4:41
4. "What Goes Boom" – 3:32

== Personnel ==
Pixies

- Black Francis – vocals, guitar
- David Lovering – drums
- Joey Santiago – guitar

Additional personnel

- Gil Norton – production
- Ding (Simon "Dingo" Archer) – bass
- Jeremy Dubs – backing vocals
