= EP3 (Pixies EP) =

EP by Pixies
- Released: March 24, 2014
- Recorded: 2013
- Studio: Rockfield Studios, Wales additional recording at Sonelab, Easthampton the Autumn Den, Northampton
- Genre: Alternative rock, Indie rock
- Length: 16:21

Pixies chronology
EP2 (2014)	EP3 (2014)	Indie Cindy (2014)

Professional ratings
Review scores
Source	Rating
NME	8/10

EP3 is the third EP in a series of EPs released by American alternative rock band Pixies, released on March 24, 2014.

== Track listing ==
1. "Bagboy" – 4:53
2. "Silver Snail" – 3:29
3. "Ring the Bell" – 3:35
4. "Jaime Bravo" – 4:24

== Personnel ==
Pixies

- Black Francis – vocals, guitar
- David Lovering – drums
- Joey Santiago – guitar

=== Additional personnel ===
- Ding (Simon "Dingo" Archer) – bass
- Vaughan Oliver – artwork
