= Emma Richardson =

English musician and artist (born 1982)

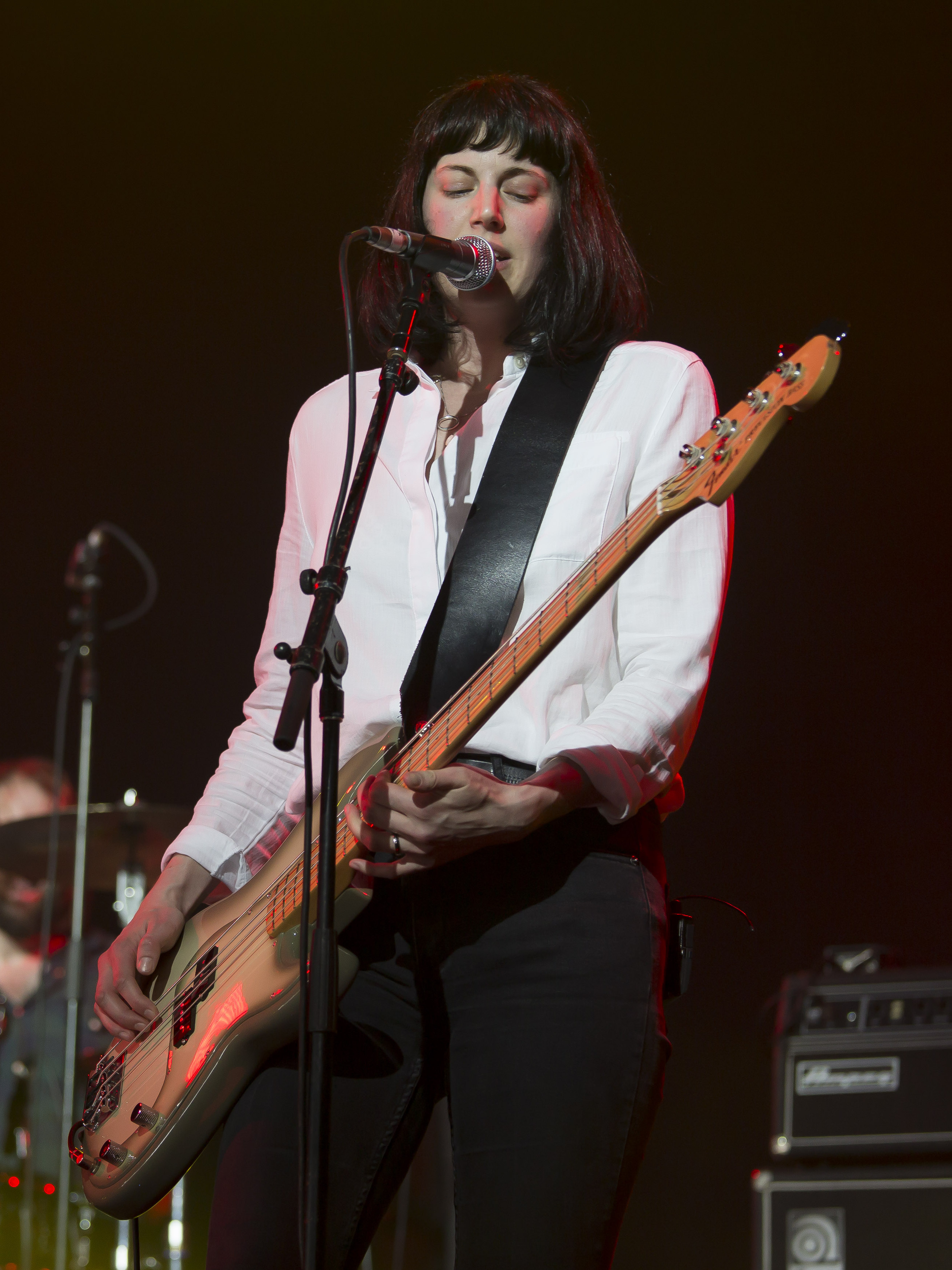
- Richardson performing with Band of Skulls in 2015

Background information
- Born: July 14, 1982 (age 44); Southampton, Hampshire, England
- Genres: Alternative rock; indie rock; blues rock; garage rock
- Occupations: Musician; artist
- Instruments: Bass; vocals
- Years active: 2002–2022; 2024–present
- Member of: Pixies
- Formerly of: Band of Skulls

Emma Richardson (born July 14, 1982) is an English musician and artist. She is known as the bass guitarist and backing vocalist of the alternative rock band Pixies, recording the studio album The Night the Zombies Came, and playing with the band live from 2024 to present. Before joining Pixies, Richardson was a member of Band of Skulls.
