= Pixies (band) =

American alternative rock band

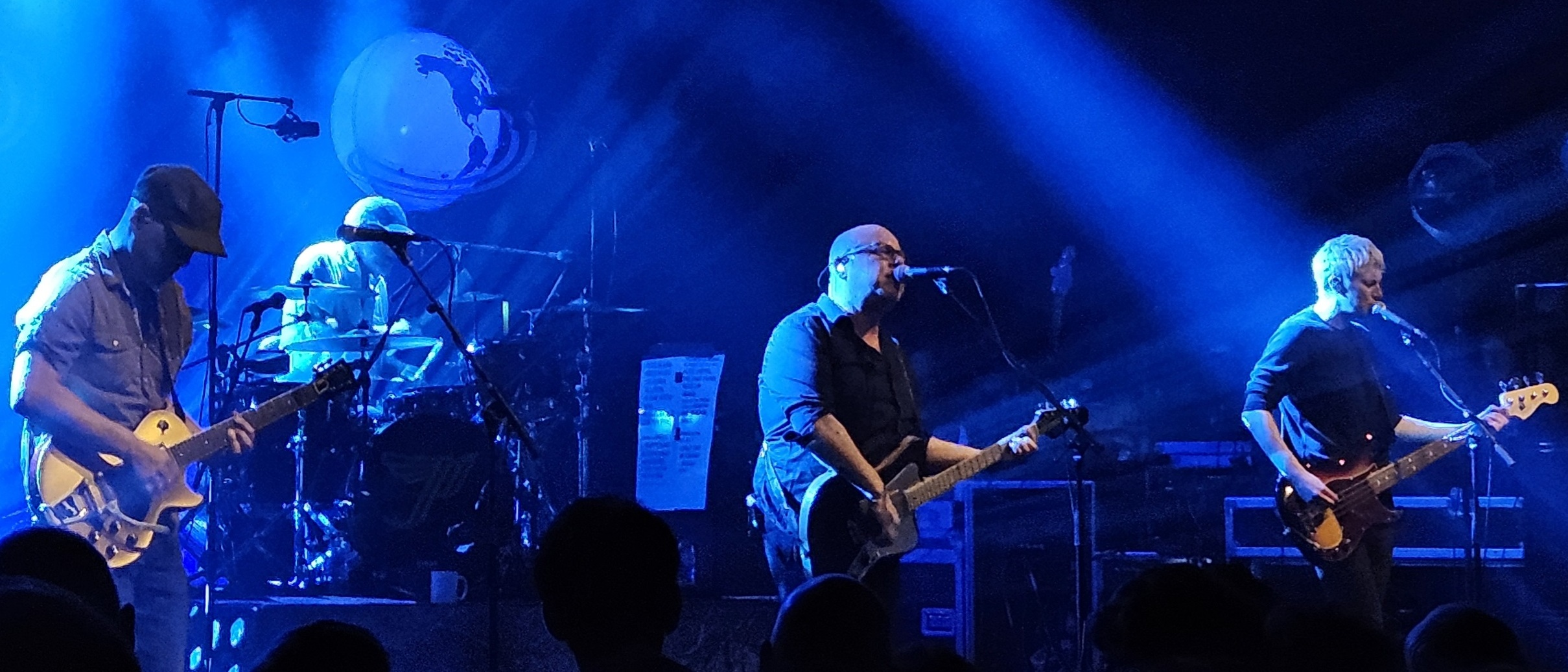
- The Pixies performing in 2024

Background information
- Origin: Boston, Massachusetts, U.S.
- Genres: Alternative rock; indie rock; noise pop; punk rock
- Works: Discography; songs
- Years active: 1986–1993; 2004–present
- Labels: 4AD; Elektra; Cooking Vinyl; Spin Art; Artemis; Pixiesmusic; PIAS; BMG
- Spinoffs: The Breeders; Frank Black and the Catholics; Grand Duchy; The Martinis
- Members: Black Francis; Joey Santiago; David Lovering; Emma Richardson
- Past members: Kim Deal; Paz Lenchantin
- Website: pixiesmusic.com

The Pixies are an American alternative rock band formed in Boston, Massachusetts, in 1986. The original lineup consisted of Black Francis (vocals, rhythm guitar), Joey Santiago (lead guitar), Kim Deal (bass, vocals) and David Lovering (drums). The Pixies are associated with the 1990s alternative rock boom, and draw on elements including punk rock and surf rock. Their music is known for dynamic "loud-quiet-loud" shifts and song structures. Francis is the primary songwriter; his often surreal lyrics cover offbeat subjects such as extraterrestrials, incest, and biblical violence.

The Pixies' debut release was the mini-LP Come On Pilgrim (1987), followed by the albums Surfer Rosa (1988), Doolittle (1989), Bossanova (1990) and Trompe le Monde (1991). They disbanded in 1993. The Pixies found only modest success in the US, but were more successful in the United Kingdom and elsewhere in Europe. Their alternative rock sound influenced acts such as Nirvana, Radiohead, Modest Mouse, the Smashing Pumpkins and Weezer.

The Pixies' popularity grew after their breakup, leading to a 2004 reunion and sold-out world tours. Deal left in 2012, and was replaced with Kim Shattuck for their 2013 tour. She was later replaced with Paz Lenchantin, who became a full member in 2016. With Lenchantin, the Pixies recorded the albums Head Carrier (2016), Beneath the Eyrie (2019) and Doggerel (2022). In 2024, Lenchantin was replaced by Emma Richardson, formerly of Band of Skulls. The ninth Pixies album, The Night the Zombies Came, was released that year.

== History ==
=== Formation (1984–1986) ===
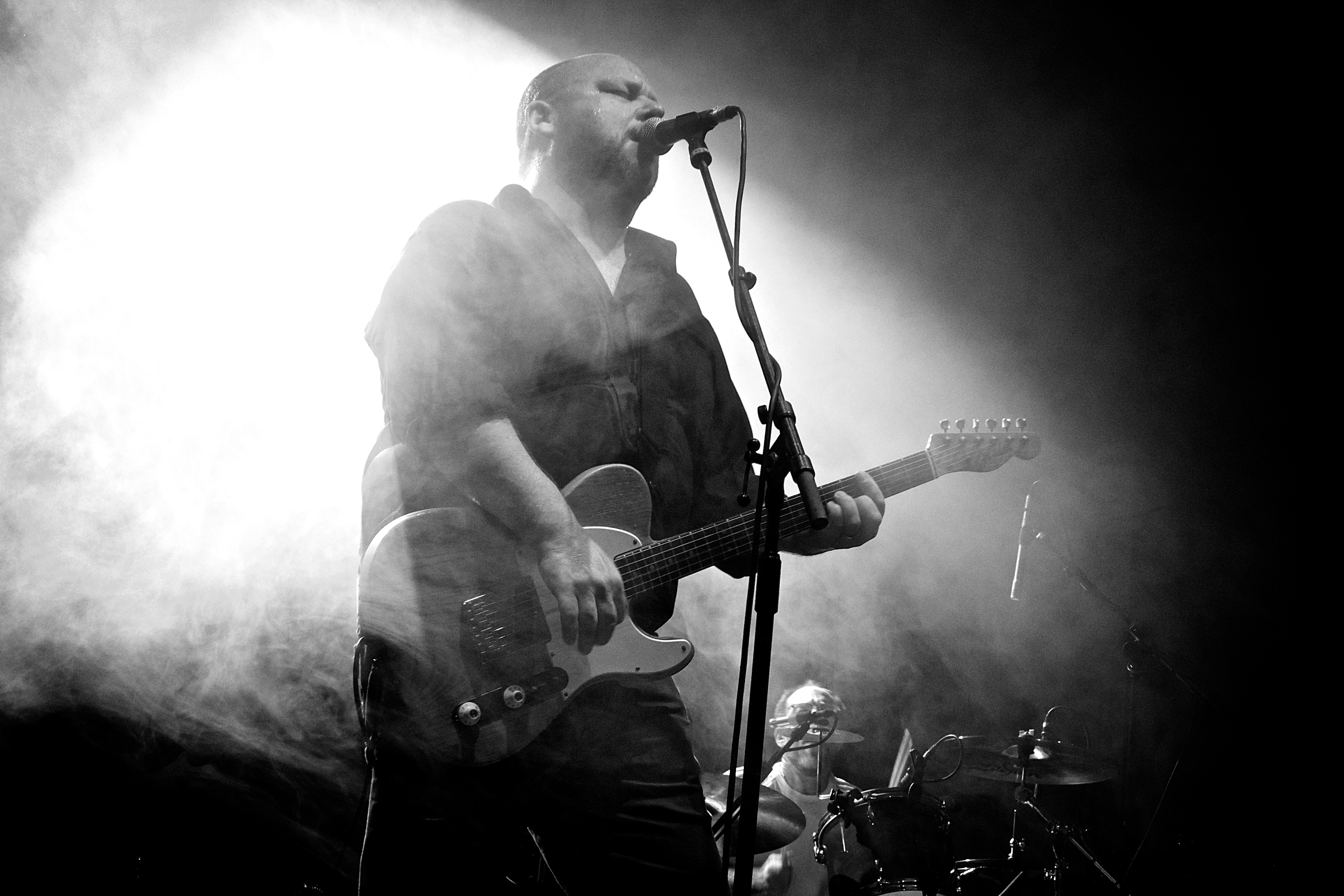
Founding member and principal songwriter Black Francis

Guitarist Joey Santiago and songwriter Black Francis (born Charles Michael Kittridge Thompson IV) met in 1984 when they lived next to each other while attending the University of Massachusetts Amherst. Although Santiago was worried about distractions, he noticed Francis played music and the pair began to jam together. Francis spent six months in Puerto Rico studying Spanish, then returned to Amherst and dropped out of the university. Francis and Santiago spent the following year working in a Boston-area warehouse, with Francis composing songs on his acoustic guitar and writing lyrics on the subway.

The pair formed a band in January 1986. Two weeks later, Francis placed an advertisement seeking a bass player who liked both the folk act Peter, Paul and Mary and the alternative rock band Hüsker Dü. Kim Deal was the only person to respond, and arrived at the audition without a bass, as she had never played one before. She was invited to join as she liked the songs Francis showed her. She obtained a bass, and the trio started rehearsing in Deal's apartment.

Deal paid for her sister, Kelley Deal, to fly to Boston and audition as a drummer. Though Francis approved, Kelley was not confident in her drumming, and was more interested in playing songs written by Kim; she later joined Kim's band the Breeders. Kim's husband suggested they hire David Lovering, whom Kim had met at her wedding reception. The group arrived at a name after Santiago selected the word "pixies" randomly from a dictionary, liking how it looked and its definition as "mischievous little elves". The Pixies moved rehearsals to Lovering's parents' garage in mid-1986 and began to play shows at bars in the Boston area.

=== Come On Pilgrim (1987) ===
While the Pixies were playing a concert with Throwing Muses, they were noticed by the producer Gary Smith, the manager of Fort Apache Studios. He told them he "could not sleep until you guys are world famous". Funded by Francis' father, the Pixies spent three days recording a 17-track demo at Fort Apache, which would become known as the Purple Tape for its purple cover. Promoter Ken Goes became the Pixies' manager, and he passed the demo to Ivo Watts-Russell of the British independent record label 4AD. Watts-Russell found the Pixies too normal and "too rock 'n' roll", but was persuaded to sign them by his girlfriend.

Upon signing with 4AD, eight tracks from the Purple Tape were selected for the Come On Pilgrim mini-LP, the Pixies' first release. Francis drew upon his experiences in Puerto Rico, mostly in the songs "Vamos" and "Isla de Encanta", describing the poverty in Puerto Rico and singing in loose Spanish. The religious lyrics and later albums came from his parents' born-again Christian days in the Pentecostal Church. The critic Heather Phares identified themes such as sexual frustration ("I've Been Tired") and incest ("Nimrod's Son" and "The Holiday Song").

=== Surfer Rosa and Doolittle (1988–1989) ===
Come On Pilgrim was followed by the Pixies' first full-length album, Surfer Rosa. It was recorded by Steve Albini, completed in two weeks, and released in early 1988. Surfer Rosa gained the Pixies acclaim in Europe; both Melody Maker and Sounds named it their "Album of the Year". American critical response was positive but more muted, a reaction that persisted for much of the Pixies' career. Surfer Rosa was eventually certified gold in the US in 2005. The Pixies arrived in England to support Throwing Muses on the European "Sex and Death" tour, beginning at the Mean Fiddler in London. The tour also took them to the Netherlands, where the Pixies had already received a significant amount of media attention.

The Pixies signed an American distribution deal with the major record label Elektra. Around this time, they struck up a relationship with the British producer Gil Norton. Norton produced their second full album, Doolittle, which was recorded in the last six weeks of 1988. Doolittle had a much cleaner sound compared to the raw sound of their first two releases, largely due to Norton and the production budget of US$40,000, which was quadruple that of Surfer Rosa. Doolittle featured the single "Here Comes Your Man", which biographers Josh Frank and Caryn Ganz describe as an unusually jaunty and pop-like song for the band. "Monkey Gone to Heaven" was popular on alternative rock radio in the US, reached the top 10 on the Billboard Modern Rock Tracks, and the single entered the Top 100 in the U.K. Like Surfer Rosa, Doolittle was acclaimed by fans and music critics alike. Doolittle was their first album to enter into the Billboard 200, peaking at 98. In the UK, the album was a commercial success, reaching number 8 in the Albums Chart.

=== Break (1989–1990) ===
After Doolittle, the tensions that had been growing between Deal and Francis came to a head (for example, Francis threw a guitar at Deal during a concert in Stuttgart), and Deal was almost fired from the band when she refused to play at a concert in Frankfurt. Santiago, in an interview with Mojo, described Deal as being "headstrong and want[ing] to include her own songs, to explore her own world" on the band's albums; eventually she accepted that Francis was the singer and had musical control of the band, but after the Frankfurt incident, "they kinda stopped talking". The band became increasingly tired during the post-Doolittle "Fuck or Fight" tour of the United States and fighting among members continued. After the tour's final date in New York City, the band was too exhausted to attend the end-of-tour party the following night and soon announced a hiatus.

During this time, Santiago and Lovering went on vacation while Francis performed a short solo tour, made up of a number of concerts to generate gas money as he traveled across the country. Deal formed a new band, the Breeders, with Tanya Donelly of Throwing Muses and bass player Josephine Wiggs of Perfect Disaster. Their debut album, Pod, was released in 1990.

=== Bossanova and Trompe le Monde (1990–1992) ===
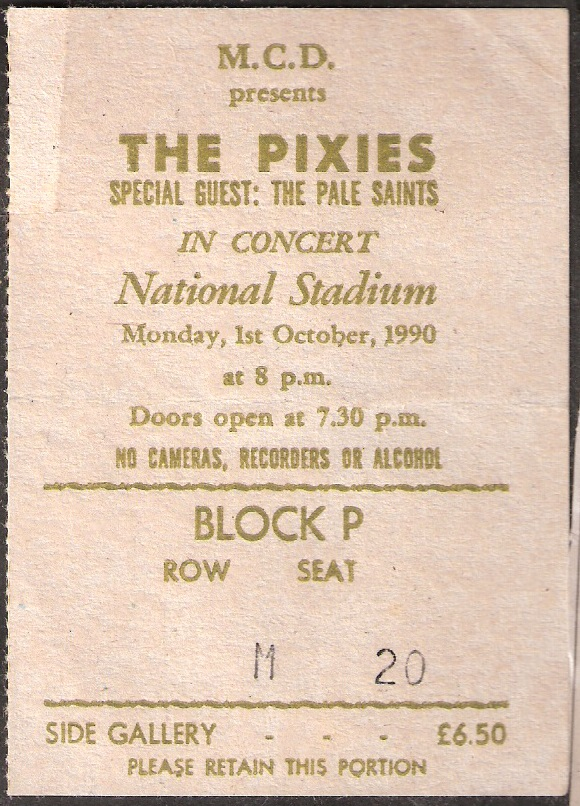
A Pixies ticket from October 1, 1990

In 1990, all members of the group except Deal moved to Los Angeles. Lovering stated that he, Santiago, and Francis moved there "because the recording studio was there". Unlike previous recordings, the band had little time to practice beforehand, and Black Francis wrote much of the album in the studio. Featuring the singles "Velouria" and "Dig for Fire", Bossanova reached number 70 in the United States. In contrast, the album peaked at number three in the United Kingdom. Also in 1990, the Pixies released a cover of the Paul Butterfield Blues Band's "Born in Chicago" on the compilation album Rubáiyát: Elektra's 40th Anniversary.

The band continued to tour and released Trompe le Monde in 1991, their final album before their break-up. The album included "U-Mass", which has been described as being about college apathy, and featured a guitar riff written years earlier at the University of Massachusetts before Francis and Santiago dropped out. The album also featured a cover of "Head On" by the Jesus and Mary Chain. Also that year, the band contributed a cover of "I Can't Forget" to the Leonard Cohen tribute album I'm Your Fan, and began an international tour on which they played stadiums in Europe and smaller venues in the United States. In 1992, they supported U2 on the lucrative US leg of their Zoo TV Tour. Their final performance took place on April 25, 1992 at the Commodore Ballroom in Vancouver, British Columbia. Tensions rose among band members, and they went on sabbatical and focused on separate projects.

=== Breakup and solo projects (1993–2003) ===
In early 1993, Francis announced in an interview with BBC Radio 5 that the Pixies were finished, without telling the other members of the band. He offered no explanation at the time. He later called Santiago and notified Deal and Lovering via fax.

After the breakup, the members embarked on separate projects. Black Francis renamed himself Frank Black, and released several solo albums, including a string of releases with Frank Black and the Catholics. Deal returned to the Breeders and released several albums, including a hit single, "Cannonball", from the platinum-selling Last Splash in 1993. She also formed the Amps, who released one album.

Santiago played lead guitar on a number of Frank Black albums and other artists' albums. He wrote music for the television show Undeclared and theme music for the film Crime and Punishment in Suburbia. He formed the Martinis with his wife, Linda Mallari, and released the album Smitten in 2004. In 2004, he also played lead guitar on the album Statecraft by the novelist and musician Charles Douglas. Lovering became a magician and performed a style of magic he called "scientific phenomenalism". He was temporarily a member of the Martinis, and later drummed with the band Cracker.

4AD and Elektra Records continued to release Pixies material: the best-of album Death to the Pixies (1997), the Peel-session compilation Pixies at the BBC (1998), and the Complete 'B' Sides compilation (2001). In 2002, material from the Pixies' original 17-track demo tape was released as an EP, Pixies, on Cooking Vinyl in the U.K. and SpinART Records in the U.S.; Black has also used these labels to release solo work and albums with the Catholics. Their song "Where is My Mind" was played during the climax of the movie Fight Club in 1999, introducing the song to a new generation of fans.

=== Reunion (2003–2012) ===
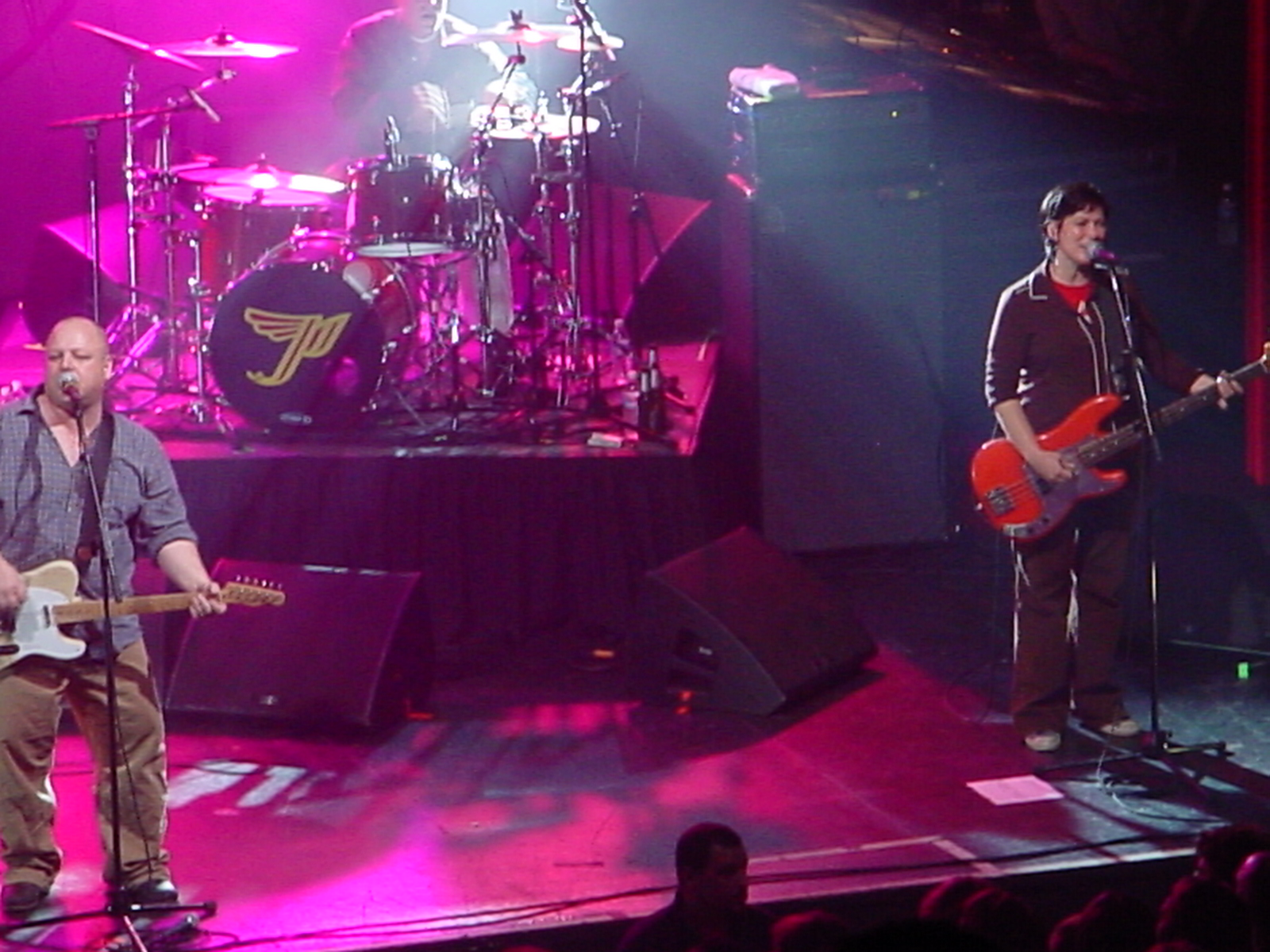
The Pixies in concert in Kansas City, October 1, 2004. From left to right, Frank Black, David Lovering (back) and Kim Deal

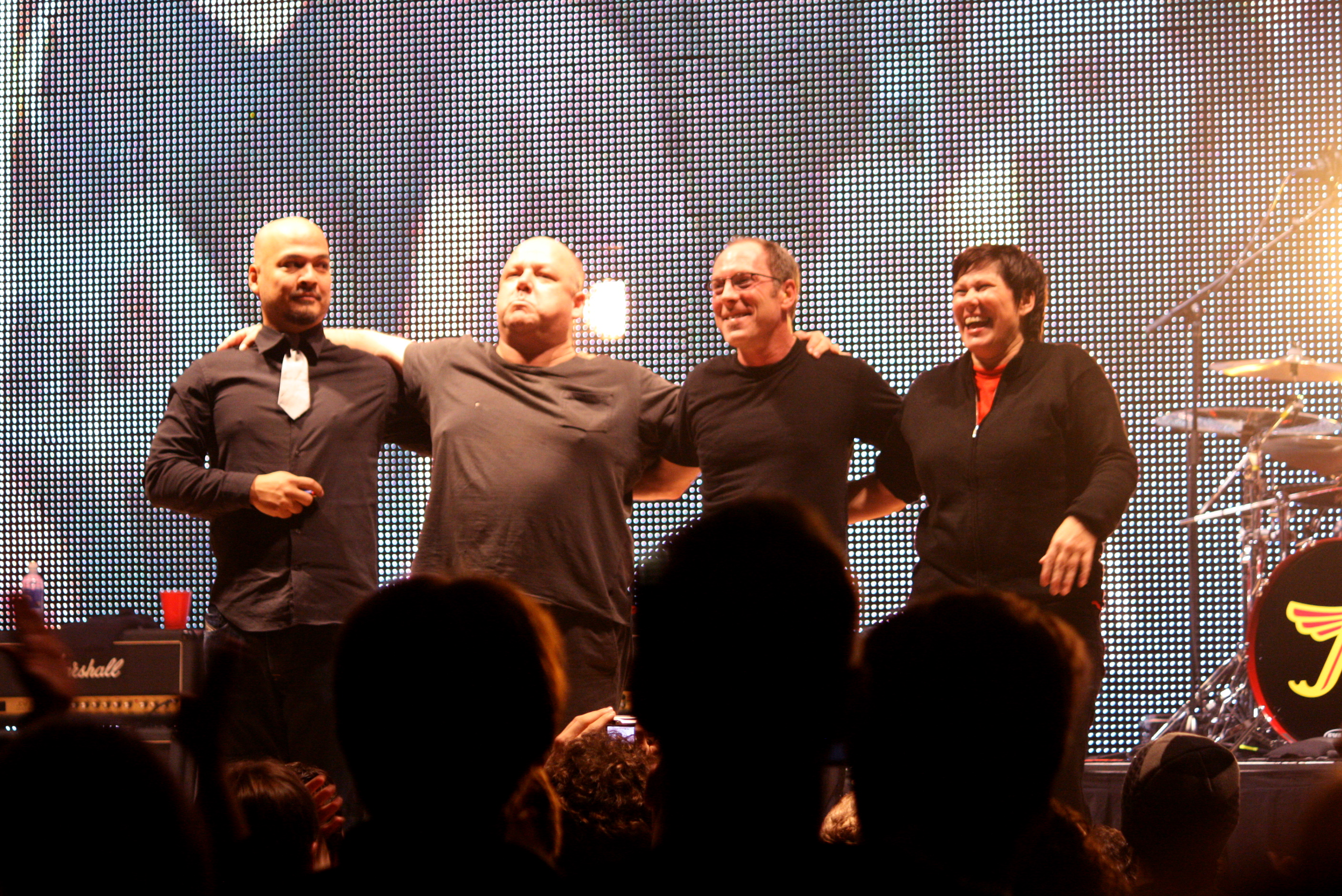
The Pixies in 2009

In the years following the Pixies' breakup, Black dismissed rumors of a reunion, but incorporated an increasing number of Pixies songs in his sets with the Catholics, and occasionally included Santiago in his solo work and Lovering's magic show as an opening act to concerts. In 2003, a series of phone calls among band members resulted in some low-key rehearsals, and soon the decision to reunite. By February 2004, a full tour was announced, and tickets for nearly all the initial tour dates sold out within minutes.

The Pixies played their first reunion concert on April 13, 2004, at the Fine Line Music Cafe in Minneapolis, Minnesota. A warm-up tour through the U.S. and Canada (in which all dates were recorded and released as individual limited-edition CDs) was followed by an appearance at the Coachella Valley Music and Arts Festival. The band toured Europe in the spring and summer of 2004, beginning on 26 May in Reykjavík and concluding on 22 August in Chelmsford. The group won the Act-of-the-Year award in the 2004 Boston Music Awards. The 2004 reunion tour grossed over $14 million in ticket sales. Pitchfork would later credit the band for ushering in "the indie-icon reunion-tour circuit ... a long overdue opportunity to play for the sort of massive crowds that their famous fans—Nirvana, Radiohead, and Weezer among them—had built on their influence."

In June 2004, the Pixies released a new song, "Bam Thwok", on the iTunes Music Store; it reached number one in the UK Official Download Chart. 4AD released Wave of Mutilation: The Best of Pixies, along with a companion DVD, Pixies. The Pixies also contributed a rendition of "Ain't That Pretty at All" to the Warren Zevon tribute album Enjoy Every Sandwich. In 2005, the Pixies performed at festivals including Lollapalooza, "T on the Fringe", and the Newport Folk Festival. They performed throughout 2006 and 2007, culminating in their first shows in Australia. Francis suggested that a new Pixies studio album was possible but unlikely, the main obstacle being Deal's reluctance.

To celebrate the 20th anniversary of Doolittle, the Pixies launched a tour in October 2009, where they performed the album track-for-track, including the associated B-sides. The tour began in Europe, continued in the United States in November, with the South American and Australian tour following in March 2010, then New Zealand, and more European dates in early 2010, and back to North America in 2010.

=== Deal's departure, Indie Cindy and the arrival of Lenchantin (2013–2015) ===
In October 2012, shortly after the Pixies began recording new material, Deal left the band. Her departure was announced in June 2013. Two weeks later, the Pixies released a new song, "Bagboy", as a free download via the Pixies' website. It features Jeremy Dubs of Bunnies and formerly of the Bennies on vocals in place of Deal. In 2023, Santiago said Deal was not in contact with her former bandmates and was "living her own life".

On July 1, 2013, the Pixies announced the addition of the Muffs and Pandoras guitarist and vocalist Kim Shattuck to replace Deal for their 2013 European tour. On September 3, 2013, the Pixies released an EP of new songs, EP1. On November 29, 2013, Shattuck announced that she had been dismissed. In December 2013, it was announced that the Entrance Band and A Perfect Circle bassist Paz Lenchantin was joining the Pixies for the 2014 tour. Lenchantin said she had been a "die-hard" Pixies fan as a teenager and that Black was the greatest artist she had worked with. The Pixies released EP2 on January 3, 2014, supported by the single "Blue Eyed Hexe". EP3 was released on March 24. The three EPs were collected as the first Pixies album in over two decades, Indie Cindy, in April 2014. In 2015, the Pixies toured in support of Robert Plant for a series of dates across North America.

=== Head Carrier, Beneath the Eyrie and Doggerel (2016–2023) ===
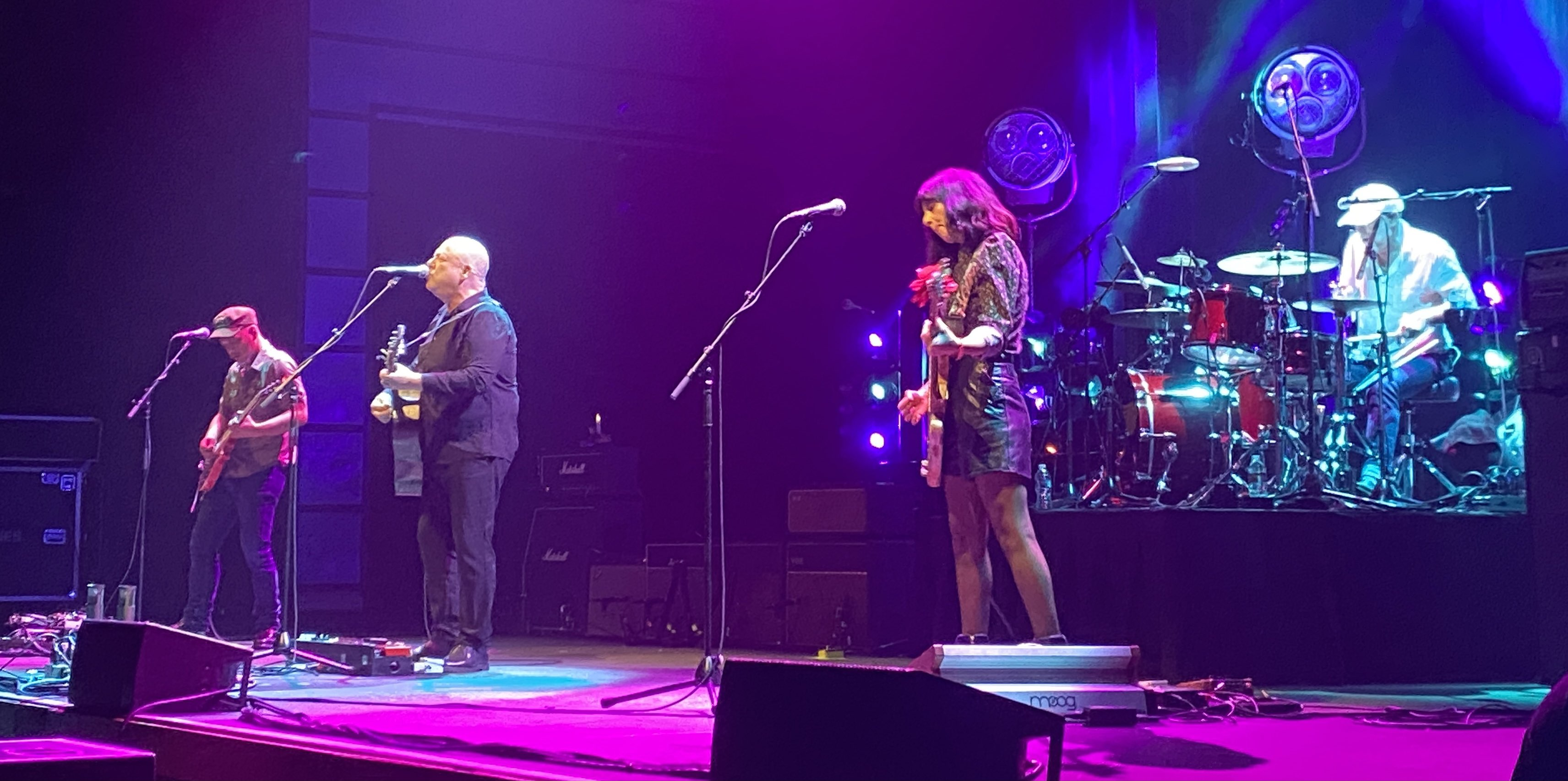
The Pixies performing in 2023

In July 2016, the Pixies announced that Lenchantin had become a permanent member, and that their sixth album, Head Carrier, would be released on September 30, 2016. Their seventh album, Beneath the Eyrie, was released on September 13, 2019, with the lead single, "On Graveyard Hill". The Pixies released a podcast, It's a Pixies Podcast, documenting the recording of the album. The Pixies released a non-album single, "Human Crime", in March 2022. They released their eighth studio album, Doggerel, with the single "There's a Moon On" on September 30 via BMG.

=== Lenchantin's departure, arrival of Richardson and The Night the Zombies Came (2024–present) ===
On 4 March 2024, the Pixies announced that Lenchantin had left "to concentrate on her own projects". In a statement to Rolling Stone, however, Lenchantin said that the choice was not hers and that her "departure [was] a bit of a surprise to [her] as it is to many". She was replaced on the following tour by Emma Richardson, formerly of Band of Skulls. The tour celebrated the Pixies' third and fourth albums, Bossanova (1990) and Trompe le Monde (1991), with Francis describing it as "delightful". In June, the Pixies released the single "You're So Impatient", Richardson's first studio credit with the band.

On October 25, 2024, the Pixies released their ninth full-length studio album, The Night the Zombies Came, produced by Tom Dalgety, who also worked on their previous three studio albums. Regarding the title, Francis said: "It's not like I wrote a bunch of songs about zombies or that we tried to make the album sound scary or anything like that. 'Zombie' is just an associative word. You can do with it what you like. And it's not a concept record, but that word kept popping up in the lyrics. When I combed through all the other lyrics for a title, they just sounded corny as shit. The only thing that made sense was The Night the Zombies Came. And I was like, 'You know what? That's a pretty good title. I'd go see that movie.'" The album was preceded by the singles "You're So Impatient", "Chicken", "Oyster Beds" and "Motoroller".

== Style ==
=== Music ===
The Pixies incorporate elements of surf rock and punk rock, with an emphasis on contrasting volume dynamics. Spin described them as "surf music-meets-Stooges spikiness and oft-imitated stop/start and quiet/loud dynamics". Writing for The Guardian, Laura Barton described their music as "an unorthodox marriage of surf music and punk rock ... characterized by Black's bristling lyrics and hackle-raising caterwaul, Deal's whispered harmonies and waspy basslines, Joey Santiago's fragile guitar, and the persistent flush of David Lovering's drums."

The Pixies incorporate extreme dynamic shifts, with Francis saying in 1991 that there are "... two basic components of rock music ... the dreamy side and the rockin' side. It's always been either sweaty or laid back and cool. We do try to be dynamic, but it's dumbo dynamics, because we don't know how to do anything else. We can play loud or quiet—that's it."

=== Influences ===
The Pixies are influenced by a range of artists and genres; each member came from a different musical background. When he first started writing songs for the Pixies, Francis says he was listening to nothing but Hüsker Dü, Captain Beefheart, and Iggy Pop; whilst in the run up to recording Come On Pilgrim he listened to R.E.M.'s Murmur a lot, which he described as "hugely influential" to his songwriting. During the making of Doolittle he listened heavily to the Beatles' White Album. He has cited Buddy Holly as a model for his compressed songwriting. Francis did not discover punk rock until he was 16, saying "it was good I didn't listen to these hip records". As a child, he listened mainly to 1960s songs, religious music and Emerson, Lake & Palmer and Talking Heads, who he says "weren't punk either".

Santiago listened to 1970s and 1980s punk (e.g. Black Flag), as well as David Bowie and T. Rex. Guitarists who influenced him include Jimi Hendrix, Les Paul, Wes Montgomery, Lou Reed and George Harrison. Deal's musical background was folk music and country; she had formed a country-folk band with her sister in her teenage years, and played covers of artists such as the Everly Brothers and Hank Williams. Other artists Deal listened to included XTC, Gang of Four and Elvis Costello. Lovering is a fan of the band Rush. Santiago said the Cars were a major influence and that "those chugging guitars [on Cars songs] are what made us chug".

Francis has cited the surrealist films Eraserhead and Un chien andalou (as mentioned in "Debaser") as influences. He said that he "didn't have the patience to sit around reading Surrealist novels", but found it easier to watch twenty-minute films.

=== Songwriting, lyrical themes and vocals ===
Most of the Pixies' songs are composed and sung by Francis. Critic Stephen Thomas Erlewine has described Francis's writing as containing "bizarre, fragmented lyrics about space, religion, sex, mutilation, and pop culture". Biblical violence is a theme of Doolittle's "Dead" and "Gouge Away"; Francis told a Melody Maker interviewer, "It's all those characters in the Old Testament. I'm obsessed with them. Why it comes out so much I don't know." He has described Come On Pilgrim's "Caribou" as being about reincarnation, and extraterrestrial themes appear in a number of songs on Bossanova.

Deal co-wrote Doolittle's "Silver" with Francis, and they share lead harmony vocals on the track. She also co-wrote and sang lead vocals on Surfer Rosa's "Gigantic", and wrote the 2004 single "Bam Thwok". She was credited as Mrs. John Murphy on "Gigantic"—at the time she was married, and she used this name as an ironic feminist joke. She also sang lead vocals on the song "Into the White" and the Neil Young cover "Winterlong", both B-sides.

Lovering sang lead vocals on Doolittle's "La La Love You" and the B-side "Make Believe". Lenchantin made her lead vocal debut on Head Carrier's "All I Think About Now". She also provided lead vocals on "Los Surfers Muertos", from 2019's Beneath The Eyrie.

== Legacy ==
The Pixies' first album, Surfer Rosa, is certified gold, while Doolittle is certified platinum, selling over 1 million copies. The band influenced a number of musicians associated with the alternative rock boom of the 1990s. Gary Smith, who produced Come On Pilgrim, said in 1997:

I've heard it said about the Velvet Underground that while not a lot of people bought their albums, everyone who did started a band. I think this is largely true about the Pixies as well. Charles' secret weapon turned out to be not so secret and, sooner or later, all sorts of bands were exploiting the same strategy of wide dynamics. It became a kind of new pop formula and, within a short while, "Smells Like Teen Spirit" was charging up the charts and even the members of Nirvana said later that it sounded for all the world like a Pixies song.

The Pixies are credited with popularizing the extreme dynamics and stop-start timing that would become widespread in alternative rock. Their songs typically feature hushed, restrained verses, and explosive, wailing choruses.

Artists including David Bowie, Matt Noveskey, Radiohead, PJ Harvey, U2, Nirvana, the Strokes, Alice in Chains, Arcade Fire, Pavement, Everclear, Kings of Leon and Matthew Good have cited admiration of the Pixies. David Bowie said the Pixies had made "just about the most compelling music of the entire 80s" and were one of the greatest American bands. Radiohead's Thom Yorke said that the Pixies "changed [his] life".

Kurt Cobain cited the band as an influence on Nirvana's "Smells Like Teen Spirit", which he admitted was a conscious attempt to co-opt the Pixies' style. In a January 1994 interview with Rolling Stone, he said, "I was trying to write the ultimate pop song. I was basically trying to rip off the Pixies. I have to admit it [smiles]. When I heard the Pixies for the first time, I connected with that band so heavily I should have been in that band—or at least in a Pixies cover band. We used their sense of dynamics, being soft and quiet and then loud and hard." Cobain cited Surfer Rosa as one of his main musical influences, and particularly admired the album's natural and powerful drum sounds, which were a result of Steve Albini's work on the record. Albini later produced Nirvana's 1993 In Utero at the request of Cobain.

Other bands and artists who have cited the Pixies as an influence include Weezer, Gavin Rossdale of Bush, Snow Patrol, Slowdive, OK Go, Eve 6, Thrice, Better Than Ezra, Toadies, Ash, Ride, Veruca Salt, Sleeper, Desaparecidos, Treepeople, and Lemuria.

== Music videos and DVDs ==
Early in their career, Pixies held an aversion to recording music videos. Come on Pilgrim and Surfer Rosa were released without any videos, with Doolittle marking their first foray into the format. "Monkey Gone to Heaven", "Debaser", and "Here Comes Your Man" from Doolittle all received music videos, the latter airing regularly on MTV. The band were wary of the track becoming a pop hit, and the video reflects their reluctance to promote the single, as Deal and Francis simply open their mouths during the song's verses, not attempting to lip-synch the lyrics.

By their next release, Bossanova, the band had developed a severe aversion to recording music videos, and Francis refused to lip-sync to them. According to their record label, their refusal to lip-synch in "Here Comes Your Man" became one of the reasons that Pixies never achieved major coverage on MTV. With Bossanova's release, 4AD hoped to have the Pixies chosen to perform their single "Velouria" on the BBC's Top of the Pops. Thus, the band shot a 23-second clip of themselves running across a quarry in Manchester, England, and slowed the clip's speed to fill out the length of the track. The group was ultimately not given a spot on the show.

The 90-minute documentary loudQUIETloud: a film about the Pixies was directed by Steven Cantor and Matthew Galkin and released in 2006. The film documents their 2004 reunion and tour, and covers the years after the break-up. In addition to Pixies and LoudQUIETloud, four other Pixies DVDs were released between 2004 and 2006, all featuring concert performances: Live at the Town and Country Club 1988, The Pixies—Sell Out, The Pixies Acoustic: Live in Newport, and The Pixies Club Date: Live at the Paradise in Boston.

Since the band's reunion in 2004, they have released several music videos for new songs, including "On Graveyard Hill", "Snakes", "Vault of Heaven", and "Hear Me Out", though the band's members rarely appear in the videos. They have also released official lyric videos for many songs on their YouTube page.

== Band members ==
Current

- Charles "Black Francis" Thompson – lead vocals, rhythm and acoustic guitar (1986–1993, 2004–present)
- Joey Santiago – lead guitar, occasional backing vocals (1986–1993, 2004–present)
- David Lovering – drums, percussion, backing vocals, occasional lead vocals and bass (1986–1993, 2004–present)
- Emma Richardson – bass, backing and occasional lead vocals (2024–present)

Former

- Kim Deal – bass, backing and occasional lead vocals (1986–1993, 2004–2012)
- Paz Lenchantin – bass, keyboards, violin, backing and occasional lead vocals (2016–2024; touring musician 2014–2016)

Session

- Simon Archer – bass (2012)

Touring

- Eric Drew Feldman – keyboards (1991)
- Bob Santiago – guitar (1991)
- Kim Shattuck – bass, backing vocals (2013; died 2019)

== Discography ==
=== Studio albums ===
- Come On Pilgrim (1987)
- Surfer Rosa (1988)
- Doolittle (1989)
- Bossanova (1990)
- Trompe le Monde (1991)
- Indie Cindy (2014)
- Head Carrier (2016)
- Beneath the Eyrie (2019)
- Doggerel (2022)
- The Night the Zombies Came (2024)

== General and cited references ==
- "50 Cent Cashes In". Recording Industry Association of America. May 3, 2005. Archived from the original on June 29, 2011.
- Albert, John (July 17, 2003). "Rock Magicians". LA Weekly. Archived from the original on December 13, 2007.
- Appleford, Steve (April 25, 2014). "The Pixies on 'Indie Cindy' and Recording Without Kim Deal". Rolling Stone. Archived from the original on August 15, 2019.
- "Artists: Pixies". Rolling Stone. Archived from the original on July 27, 2011.
- Aston, Martin (December 1997). "Hello Goodbye: Joey Santiago & The Pixies". Mojo. Archived from the original on November 29, 2020 – via Rock's Backpages.(subscription required)
- Azerrad, Michael (1994). Come as You Are: The Story of Nirvana. Doubleday. ISBN 978-0-385-47199-2.
- Barker, Emily (April 2, 2015). "Pixies announce Australia, New Zealand and European live dates". NME. Archived from the original on March 13, 2017.
- Barton, Laura (August 21, 2005). "Misfits that fit". The Guardian. Archived from the original on February 11, 2021.
- "Billboard 200: Week of September 15, 1990". Billboard. September 9, 1990. Archived from the original on August 20, 2020.
- Black, Frank (2001). Complete 'B' Sides (CD booklet). Pixies. 4AD.
- "Black Francis: Releases". Cooking Vinyl. Archived from the original on May 11, 2010.
- "Boston Music Awards 2004". Boston Music Awards. Archived from the original on January 14, 2026.
- Britton, Luke Morgan (March 16, 2015). "Robert Plant joins forces with the Pixies for tour". NME. Archived from the original on December 23, 2020.
- Carew, Anthony. "The Pixies – Artist Profile". About.com. Archived from the original on November 18, 2012.
- Chick, Stevie (March 14, 2008). "Sister Bliss". The Guardian. Archived from the original on December 24, 2020.
- Cho, Paige X. (September 1, 2009). "Pixies Announce Australian Tour". Citysearch. Archived from the original on August 21, 2011.
- Cohen, Jason (August 2002). "Life to the Pixies". Spin.
- Cornelius, David (August 22, 2006). "Pixies Acoustic: Live in Newport, The". DVD Talk. Archived from the original on February 11, 2021.
- Cragg, Michael (July 1, 2013). "Pixies – Bagboy: New music". The Guardian. Archived from the original on November 26, 2020.
- Deming, Mark. "Enjoy Every Sandwich: The Songs of Warren Zevon". AllMusic. Archived from the original on September 6, 2018.
- Deville, Chris (March 2, 2022). "Pixies – 'Human Crime'". Stereogum. Archived from the original on March 2, 2022.
- Doolittle (CD booklet). Pixies. 4AD. 1989.
- Dowling, Stephen (June 2, 2004). "The Pixies: Rock's comeback kings". BBC News. Archived from the original on August 15, 2020.
- Egan, Barry (September 20, 2009). "A gigantic influence on pop music". Irish Independent. Archived from the original on November 6, 2020.
- Erlewine, Stephen Thomas. "Breeders Biography". AllMusic. Archived from the original on January 16, 2011.
- Erlewine, Stephen Thomas. "Death to the Pixies 1987–1991". AllMusic. Archived from the original on October 15, 2020.
- Erlewine, Stephen Thomas. "Frank Black Biography". AllMusic. Archived from the original on May 30, 2019.
- Erlewine, Stephen Thomas. "I'm Your Fan: The Songs of Leonard Cohen". AllMusic. Archived from the original on February 29, 2020.
- Erlewine, Stephen Thomas. "Pixies Biography". AllMusic. Archived from the original on May 22, 2016.
- Erlewine, Stephen Thomas. "Weezer Biography". AllMusic. Archived from the original on March 27, 2021.
- Ford, Tracey (April 25, 2005). "Weezer Rock Lollapalooza". Rolling Stone. Archived from the original on November 2, 2007.
- "Frank Black: Credits". AllMusic. Archived from the original on January 15, 2023.
- "Frank Black and the Catholics". SpinART Records. Archived from the original on February 1, 2003.
- "Frank Black and the Catholics: Releases". Cooking Vinyl. Archived from the original on July 19, 2011.
- "Frank Black: Kim Deal is against new Pixies album". NME. February 16, 2007. Archived from the original on October 13, 2007.
- "Frank Black: Releases". Cooking Vinyl. Archived from the original on February 11, 2011.
- "Frank Blacks Out Pixies Reunion". NME. December 13, 2000. Archived from the original on October 17, 2011.
- Frank, Josh; Ganz, Caryn (2005). Fool the World: The Oral History of a Band Called Pixies. St. Martin's Press. ISBN 0-312-34007-9.
- Fritch, Matthew (April 15, 2001). "Frank Black: Odd Ball". Magnet. Archived from the original on February 15, 2021.
- Fullerton, Jamie (January 19, 2010). "Pixies announce Australia, New Zealand and European live dates". NME. Archived from the original on August 17, 2020.
- Grose, Jessica (May 28, 2002). "Cool as Kim Deal". The Village Voice. Archived from the original on September 22, 2008.
- Heilman, Dan. "Rubaiyat: Elektra's 40th Anniversary". AllMusic. Archived from the original on April 10, 2012.
- Hogan, Marc (July 21, 2016). "Here Are the Lyrics to the New Pixies Song Apologizing to Kim Deal". Pitchfork. Archived from the original on October 26, 2020.
- "In Pursuit of Your Happiness: Credits". AllMusic. Archived from the original on August 15, 2023.
- Johnson, Richard (June 29, 2009). "Pixies announce 'Doolittle' tour and ticket details". NME. Archived from the original on July 2, 2009.
- Kot, Greg (November 7, 2004). "Pixies defy odds with reunion tour". Chicago Tribune. Archived from the original on October 18, 2018.
- Krol, Charlotte (June 8, 2022). "Pixies confirm new album 'Doggerel' with single 'There's A Moon On'". NME. Archived from the original on November 23, 2025.
- Lash, Jolie (September 12, 2005). "Pixies : Minneapolis Fine Line Music Cafe". NME. Archived from the original on January 1, 2021.
- "News". The Martinis. Archived from the original (Select "About" for information about Undeclared and Crime and Punishment in Suburbia) on November 22, 2004.
- Mendelssohn, John (2005). Gigantic: The Story of Frank Blank and the Pixies. Omnibus Press. ISBN 1-84449-490-X.
- Moss, Corey (May 3, 2004). "Cure, Pixies Hottest Things at Coachella (Aside the Weather)". MTV. Archived from the original on March 3, 2021.
- Pelley, Rich (February 3, 2022). "Pixies frontman Black Francis: 'Kim Deal? We're always friends – but nothing is for ever'". The Guardian. Archived from the original on February 26, 2026.
- Phares, Heather. "Come On Pilgrim". AllMusic. Archived from the original on October 28, 2020.
- Phares, Heather. "The Martinis: Biography". AllMusic. Archived from the original on October 10, 2020.
- Phares, Heather. "Pod". AllMusic. Archived from the original on October 28, 2020.
- Phares, Heather. "Trompe le Monde". AllMusic. Archived from the original on October 28, 2020.
- Phares, Heather. "Wave of Mutilation: The Best of Pixies". AllMusic. Archived from the original on April 8, 2019.
- "Pixies". 4AD. Archived from the original on December 24, 2020.
- "Pixies". SpinART Records. Archived from the original on April 22, 2003.
- "Pixies abandon new songs". NME. June 20, 2006. Archived from the original on July 2, 2006.
- "Pixies announce Australian tour dates". NME. February 16, 2007. Archived from the original on February 18, 2007.
- "Pixies Announce Summer Tour... But Their Future is Uncertain". NME. March 23, 2006. Archived from the original on August 17, 2020.
- "Pixies announce US 'Doolittle' tour details". NME. June 3, 2010. Archived from the original on June 8, 2010.
- Pixies at the BBC (CD booklet). Pixies. 4AD. 1998.
- "Pixies: Awards". AllMusic. Archived from the original on August 23, 2012.
- "Pixies Chart History – Billboard 200". Billboard. Archived from the original on October 26, 2025.
- "Pixies confirm release of Indie Cindy, their first studio album in two decades". The Guardian. March 25, 2014. Archived from the original on March 27, 2014.
- "Pixies full Official Chart history". Official Charts Company. Archived from the original on November 13, 2025.
- "Pixies mainman gives lowdown on band's new album". NME. July 31, 2005. Archived from the original on November 11, 2011.
- "Pixies name Paz Lenchatin as new bassist". NME. December 9, 2013. Archived from the original on December 11, 2013.
- "Pixies Pen First New Song In 13 Years". Billboard. June 14, 2004. Archived from the original on March 25, 2007.
- "Pixies: Releases". Cooking Vinyl. Archived from the original on July 19, 2011.
- "Pixies sell out!". NME. February 24, 2004. Archived from the original on March 16, 2011.
- "Pixies to begin work on new album". NME. October 24, 2006. Archived from the original on November 8, 2006.
- "Pixies to reunite for new album?". NME. August 27, 2008. Archived from the original on August 28, 2008.
- "Pixies to Reunite for Tour – Official!". NME. February 3, 2004. Archived from the original on October 17, 2011.
- "Pixies Unplug for Newport Folk Festival". Billboard. June 16, 2005. Archived from the original on August 19, 2020.
- Rettig, James (June 8, 2022). "Pixies – 'There's a Moon On'". Stereogum. Archived from the original on December 8, 2025.
- Roach, Martin (2009). The Virgin Book of British Hit Albums. Virgin Books. ISBN 978-0-7535-1700-0.
- Roach, Martin (2008). The Virgin Book of British Hit Singles. Virgin Books. ISBN 978-0-7535-1537-2.
- Rogers, Jude (May 2, 2009). "'It used to be about music. Now, without the drink, it's good to go back to that'". The Guardian. Archived from the original on October 30, 2020.
- Shaffer, Claire (June 18, 2019). "Pixies Unveil Recording Process in 'It's a Pixies Podcast' Trailer". Rolling Stone. Archived from the original on November 29, 2020.
- "Show Me Your Tears: Credits". AllMusic. Archived from the original on May 12, 2011.
- Sisario, Ben (2006). Doolittle. 33⅓. Continuum. ISBN 0-8264-1774-4.
- Spitz, Marc (September 2004). "Life to the Pixies". Spin. Archived from the original on January 29, 2020.
- Stokes, Paul (November 5, 2009). "Pixies kick off US leg of 'Doolittle' tour in Los Angeles". NME. Archived from the original on October 27, 2020.
- "Stuff: Credits". AllMusic. Archived from the original on April 28, 2023.
- Surfer Rosa (CD booklet). Pixies. 4AD. 1998.
- "Teenager of the Year: Credits". AllMusic. Archived from the original on October 4, 2011.
- Wallis, J. Doyle (October 16, 2006). "The Pixies Club Date: Live at the Paradise in Boston". DVD Talk. Archived from the original on August 6, 2020.
- Weingarten, Marc (November 26, 2004). "Mini Capsule Review: Statecraft". Entertainment Weekly. Archived from the original on April 25, 2009.
