= Indie Cindy =

Studio album by Pixies
- Released: April 19, 2014
- Recorded: 2012
- Studios: Rockfield Studios, Rockfield, Wales; Sonelab, Easthampton, Massachusetts; The Autumn Den, Northampton, Massachusetts
- Genres: Alternative rock; indie rock; pop rock
- Length: 45:49
- Labels: Pixiesmusic, PIAS
- Producer: Gil Norton

Pixies chronology
EP3 (2014)	Indie Cindy (2014)	Head Carrier (2016)

Singles from Indie Cindy
- 1. "Bagboy" Released: July 2013

Indie Cindy is the fifth studio album by the American alternative rock band the Pixies which was released on April 19, 2014, it was the band's first album since 1991's Trompe le Monde (1991) and the first Pixies album not to feature bass guitar player Kim Deal. Instead, bass guitar duties on the album are handled by Simon "Ding" Archer, a former member of the British post-punk band The Fall.

The album combines all the songs from the band's 2013–14 extended play releases—EP1, EP2, and EP3—which were recorded and produced in 2012 by Gil Norton, who produced the band's previous albums Doolittle (1989), Bossanova (1990), and Trompe le Monde.

Limited numbers of vinyl copies of the album were released on Record Store Day 2014 (double album but pressed at 45 rpm), 10 days prior to the album's full release. These copies came with a single-sided 7" single of "Women of War". The album was released in North America on April 29, 2014, as a digital download, digipak CD and 2LP vinyl as well as a deluxe edition on CD or vinyl which included a live CD and a 40-page hardback book.

== Commercial performance ==
The album peaked at number 23 on the US Billboard 200, making it the band's most successful album on that chart. In 2016 it was awarded a gold certification from the Independent Music Companies Association which indicated sales of at least 75,000 copies throughout Europe. As of 2015, sales in the United States have exceeded 34,000 copies, according to Nielsen SoundScan.

== Critical reception ==
Professional ratings
Aggregate scores
Source	Rating
AnyDecentMusic?	5.8/10
Metacritic	62/100
Review scores
Source	Rating
AllMusic	3/5 stars
Entertainment Weekly	A−
The Guardian	3/5 stars
The Independent	3/5 stars
The Irish Times	4/5 stars
NME	7/10
Pitchfork	2.5/10
Q	3/5 stars
Rolling Stone	3/5 stars
Spin	6/10

At Metacritic, which assigns a weighted mean rating out of 100 to reviews from mainstream critics, Indie Cindy received an average score of 62 based on 32 reviews; this indicates "generally favorable reviews". Many critics dismissed the album as they believed it was more predictable than their earlier material, with many describing it as a solo album by singer Black Francis, due to the absence of former bassist Kim Deal. Jamie Atkins of Record Collector felt it had a "lack of personality" which was "most strikingly felt in Kim Deal’s absence.", while Fact said it was "comfortingly familiar, consistent and enjoyable, as well as totally uninspired" and that it "plays just like one of Black’s solo efforts, but with better session players: good, yes, but never great."

Chris Todd of The Line of Best Fit felt that "[a]ll the components are there, Joey Santiago’s guitar work is still impressive, Lovering’s drumming is still vigorous, but the problem is Black Francis himself. The compelling songwriting that completed Pixies is no longer there." Phil Hebblethwaite of NME gave the album a positive review, while noting Deal's departure causing some songs to resemble Black Francis' solo work, he also believed "[h]er departure let Black Francis, guitarist Joey Santiago, drummer David Lovering and stand-in bassist Simon ‘Ding’ Archer loose, and, at its best, like on ‘Bagboy’, ‘Indie Cindy’ is free-sounding, adventurous and explosive."

Stephen M. Deusner of Paste was dismissive of the album, saying "Indie Cindy represents either an act of masochistic bravado, a display of stark determination, or—and this is the worst option—an act of blindered ignorance" and felt "[w]hat makes Indie Cindy so egregious, so much worse than a simply bad album, is how much better it could have been." Helen Brown of The Telegraph noted "[t]he result is not bad: though you miss the unpredictable blasts of raw hellfire from the cult classic Surfer Rosa era, the band find some gritty, grindy melodies in the bigger, slicker vein of 1991’s patchy Trompe Le Monde."

== Track listing ==
All songs written by Black Francis, except where noted.

Standard edition
No.	Title	Length
1.	"What Goes Boom"	3:32
2.	"Greens and Blues"	3:46
3.	"Indie Cindy"	4:41
4.	"Bagboy"	4:52
5.	"Magdalena 318"	3:26
6.	"Silver Snail"	3:29
7.	"Blue Eyed Hexe"	3:11
8.	"Ring the Bell"	3:34
9.	"Another Toe in the Ocean"	3:46
10.	"Andro Queen"	3:23
11.	"Snakes"	3:45
12.	"Jaime Bravo"	4:24
Total length:		45:49

Deluxe edition bonus disc (Live in the USA 2014)
No.	Title	Writer(s)	Length
1.	"Bone Machine"		3:09
2.	"Hey"		3:17
3.	"Ana"		2:15
4.	"Magdalena 318"		3:27
5.	"Snakes"		3:21
6.	"Indie Cindy"		4:09
7.	"I've Been Tired"		2:50
8.	"Head On"	Jim Reid, William Reid	2:08
9.	"The Sad Punk"		2:40
10.	"Distance Equals Rate Times Time"		1:17
11.	"Something Against You"		1:40
12.	"Isla De Encanta"		1:36
13.	"Planet of Sound"		3:27
Total length:			1:21:05

Bonus 7" single
No.	Title	Length
1.	"Women of War"	3:48

== Personnel ==
Pixies

- Black Francis – vocals, guitar, backing vocals on "Bagboy"
- David Lovering – drums, backing vocals on "Women of War" and "Bagboy"
- Joey Santiago – lead guitar

Additional musicians

- Ding (Simon "Ding" Archer) – bass
- Jeremy Dubs – backing vocals
- Paz Lenchantin – bass and backing vocals on deluxe edition tracks and "Women of War"

Technical personnel

- Gil Norton – production, mixing, engineering
- Dan Austin – mixing
- Justin Pizzoferrato – additional engineering (Sonelab)
- Mike Stitsinger – additional engineering (The Autumn Den)
- Miles Wilson – mixing (live tracks)
- Vaughan Oliver – art direction, design
- Michael Speed – design assistance, xp illustration
- Ian Pollock – character illustration

== Charts ==
=== Weekly charts ===
Weekly chart performance for Indie Cindy
Chart (2014)	Peak position
Australian Albums (ARIA)	21
Austrian Albums (Ö3 Austria)	11
Belgian Albums (Ultratop Flanders)	11
Belgian Albums (Ultratop Wallonia)	16
Danish Albums (Hitlisten)	34
Finnish Albums (Suomen virallinen lista)	44
French Albums (SNEP)	16
German Albums (Offizielle Top 100)	10
Irish Albums (IRMA)	4
Dutch Albums (Album Top 100)	23
New Zealand Albums (RMNZ)	33
Norwegian Albums (VG-lista)	32
Portuguese Albums (AFP)	21
Spanish Albums (Promusicae)	29
Swedish Albums (Sverigetopplistan)	57
Swiss Albums (Schweizer Hitparade)	23
UK Albums (Official Charts)	6
UK Independent Albums (Official Charts)	2
UK Album Downloads (Official Charts)	19
US Billboard 200	23
US Top Alternative Albums (Billboard)	3
US Independent Albums (Billboard)	6
US Top Rock Albums (Billboard)	8
US Indie Store Album Sales (Billboard)	1

=== Year-end charts ===
Year-end chart performance for Indie Cindy
Chart (2014)	Position
Belgian Albums (Ultratop Flanders)	167
French Albums (SNEP)	186

== Release history ==
Indie Cindy formats and release dates
Region	Date	Edition	Label
International	19 April 2014	Limited edition vinyl exclusively for Record Store Day	Pixiesmusic, PIAS
Japan	23 April 2014	CD, LP, DD, deluxe edition	Pixiesmusic, PIAS
International	28 April 2014	CD, LP, DD, deluxe	Pixiesmusic, PIAS
North America	29 April 2014	CD, LP, DD, deluxe	Pixiesmusic, PIAS
