= EP2 (Pixies EP) =

2014 extended play by Pixies

EP by Pixies
- Released: January 3, 2014
- Recorded: 2013
- Genre: Alternative rock, indie rock
- Length: 14:10
- Producer: Gil Norton

Pixies chronology
EP1 (2013)	EP2 (2014)	EP3 (2014)

EP2 is the second EP in a series of EPs released by American alternative rock band Pixies, released on January 3, 2014.

== Composition and recording ==
Black Francis described his inspiration for the song "Blue Eyed Hexe": "The song took on different forms, different music and different sets of lyrics. It went through a lot of changes before it settled where it is now. It's a tale from the northwest of the country and it's a witch-woman kind of a song. That's what a hexe is. And she's a blue-eyed hexe!"

Black Francis wrote "Greens and Blues" with the intention of creating "a better 'Gigantic'" – something that would "musically, emotionally and psychologically – sit in the same place that Gigantic has sat" and serve as a "show-closer."

== Critical reception ==
Professional ratings
Aggregate scores
Source	Rating
Metacritic	54/100
Review scores
Source	Rating
Allmusic	3.5/5 stars
Consequence of Sound	C−
Drowned in Sound	7/10
Mojo	3/5 stars
NME	8/10
Pitchfork	2.0/10
Popmatters	3/10 stars
Punknews	3.5/5 stars
Rolling Stone	2.5/5 stars
Sputnikmusic	2.8/5

Like EP1, EP2 received mostly negative reviews and was sometimes compared unfavorably to the band's earlier work. In a 2.0/10 review for Pitchfork, Jayson Greene described the two EPs as "an increasingly mournful asterisk affixed to a beloved legacy". Greene gave modest praise to "Magdalena" which he wrote "sounds, passingly, like a lesser track from Bossanova or Teenager of the Year", but panned "Blue Eyed Hexe", writing "[Black Francis] screams like a Brian Johnson imitator over a foursquare riff with no wit or play in it, the clonking woodblock hitting like a kid brother socking you repeatedly in the arm." John Dolan from Rolling Stone wrote that EP2 "feels like a faint echo of the band's later albums".

Mark Beaumont at NME gave the EP a positive review, writing that the four tracks "eschew any attempt to recreate the breathless brutalities of Doolittle or Surfer Rosa and instead move Pixies boldly on". Beaumont praised "Blue Eyed Hexe" for recreating "the menace of Pixies’ early work" and described "Greens and Blues" as "the most grab-at-the-sky Big Pop moment the new EPs have produced so far". Marc Burrows' review for Drowned in Sound was also generally positive, noting "what constitutes feeling their way back for the Pixies would be mightily impressive for a lesser band".

== Track listing ==
1. "Blue Eyed Hexe" – 3:12
2. "Magdalena 318" – 3:25
3. "Greens and Blues" – 3:47
4. "Snakes" – 3:46

== Personnel ==
Pixies

- Black Francis – vocals, guitar
- David Lovering – drums
- Joey Santiago – guitar

Additional personnel

- Gil Norton – production
- Ding (Simon "Ding" Archer) – bass guitar
- Vaughan Oliver – artwork
