= Doggerel (album) =

Studio album by Pixies
- Released: September 30, 2022
- Recorded: January–February 2022
- Studios: Guilford Sound, Guilford, Vermont
- Genre: Rock
- Length: 42:04
- Labels: Infectious Music; BMG
- Producer: Tom Dalgety

Pixies chronology
Beneath the Eyrie (2019)	Doggerel (2022)	The Night the Zombies Came (2024)

Singles from Doggerel
- 1. "There's a Moon On" Released: June 8, 2022; 2. "Vault of Heaven" Released: August 9, 2022; 3. "Dregs of the Wine" Released: September 6, 2022

Doggerel is the eighth studio album by American alternative rock band Pixies, released on September 30, 2022, by Infectious Music and BMG Rights Management. It was produced by Tom Dalgety and preceded by the singles "There's a Moon On", "Vault of Heaven" and "Dregs of the Wine".

It is the band's final album with bass guitarist and backing vocalist Paz Lenchantin, who departed from the band in March 2024 after extensive touring in support of the album.

== Background and recording ==
The band recorded the album at Guilford Sound, an eco-friendly studio in Guilford, Vermont, with producer Tom Dalgety, with the basis for some tracks being the significant number of demos Black Francis had recorded in the time following the band's previous album, Beneath the Eyrie (2019). The process of making the album was also filmed for a short documentary released in June 2022. The COVID-19 pandemic interrupted recording, resulting in the individual band members working on tracks at their homes.

In a press release, Black Francis stated that the band were "trying to do things that are very big and bold and orchestrated" on the album. He elaborated, "The punky stuff, I really like playing it but you just cannot artificially create that shit. There's another way to do this, there's other things we can do with this extra special energy that we're encountering." Guitarist Joey Santiago expressed that the band "have grown. We no longer have under two-minute songs. We have little breaks, more conventional arrangements but still our twists in there".

The album also marks the first time Santiago has received songwriting credits on a Pixies album, having contributed music to "Dregs of the Wine" and lyrics to "Pagan Man". Described by Black Francis as "an unfinished bit of music that the producer kept insisting that we try again," "Pagan Man" was the last song recorded for the album. "I was not in the mood to compose a lyric because I was already spent, if you will. So Joey wrote the lyric." Santiago explains that he had never been motivated to write for Pixies, as Black Francis was always competent to perform that role, but the downtime during the recording sessions resulted in the guitarist tinkering with these two songs and him presenting it to his bandmates.

== Critical reception ==
Professional ratings
Aggregate scores
Source	Rating
Metacritic	73/100
Review scores
Source	Rating
AllMusic	3.5/5 stars
The Line of Best Fit	8/10
Loud and Quiet	6/10
Pitchfork	6.5/10
PopMatters	5/10
The Skinny	4/5 stars
Sonic Seducer	6.72/10
The Guardian	4/5 stars

Doggerel received a score of 73 out of 100 on review aggregator Metacritic based on twelve critics' reviews, indicating "generally favorable" reception. Jamie Wilde of The Skinny wrote that the band "offer fans something new with their material; something more conventional, sophisticated and orchestrated" than their output of the late 1980s. Wilde also felt that "some choruses on tracks like Vault of Heaven do verge on feeling a bit bland" but that Black Francis's "inimitable vocal twangs still remain and he still has plenty to say yet". Reviewing the album for The Line of Best Fit, Christopher Hamilton-Peach wrote that Doggerel has an abundance of "riffs and rockabilly nods" and "finds the American alternative mainstays reinstating bittersweet peaks and ironic edge". Hamilton-Peach elaborated that the album "revolves between the erringly melodic and angst-filtered", calling "The Lord Has Come Back Today" an "upbeat ditty" and describing "You're Such a Sadducee" as having "esoteric-themed acerbic punk bite".

Ben Lynch of Loud and Quiet called Doggerel "the best Pixies record since they've reformed", writing that the band "rips through a range of styles, from furious grunge to acoustic pop swoons, often, if not always, with a gusto that on occasions almost gets you feeling excited again". Iain Key of Louder Than War named it "Album of the Week" and found it to be "an instant album which should please fans young and old" that listeners "will want to play loud, with Dave Lovering's drumming as taut and powerful as ever creating the perfect engine room with Paz Lenchantin now established on bass".

Reviewing the album for Pitchfork, Stephen Thomas Erlewine wrote that "Nothing about Doggerel sounds youthful. The band relies on chops instead of accidents to thrill, favoring production that's clean, burly, and without a lick of grit", and concluded that "there's no denying that Pixies are now an outfit built for comfort, not speed—a group that's found its personal sweet spot and is content to linger there".

In a mixed review for PopMatters, Jay Honeycomb wrote "Black is bitter and irreverent one moment, sincere and sagely the next. These moods are sequenced together without much thread, and it's hard to know what mindset you need to be in to connect with this album fully. You can hear the talent, but it's muted chiefly under a comfortable blanket of ennui."

The German magazine Sonic Seducer published the reviews of nine staff writers. The result was also mixed with some authors calling the album "fresh" and "a great collection of songs" and others dubbing it dull and monotonous. Reviewer Kym Gnuch complained about "too many songs sounding like CCR, Bob Dylan, Tom Petty and other 1970s blues rock legends." Stephan Wolf wondered whether Jello Biafra had influenced the songwriting, whereas Breda Massmann and Thomas Thyssen praised the "catchy melodies" and the overall arrangement.

== Track listing ==
All tracks are written by Black Francis, except for "Dregs of the Wine" and "Pagan Man", co-written with Joey Santiago.

Doggerel track listing
No.	Title	Length
1.	"Nomatterday"	4:10
2.	"Vault of Heaven"	4:00
3.	"Dregs of the Wine"	3:30
4.	"Haunted House"	3:30
5.	"Get Simulated"	3:18
6.	"The Lord Has Come Back Today"	2:40
7.	"Thunder and Lightning"	3:20
8.	"There's a Moon On"	2:50
9.	"Pagan Man"	3:00
10.	"Who's More Sorry Now?"	3:14
11.	"You're Such a Sadducee"	3:54
12.	"Doggerel"	4:38
Total length:		42:04

== Personnel ==
Pixies

- Black Francis – guitar, lead vocals
- Paz Lenchantin – bass guitar, keyboards, backing vocals
- David Lovering – drums
- Joey Santiago – guitar

Technical personnel

- Tom Dalgety – production, mixing, engineering
- Dave Snyder – engineering assistance
- Matt Hall – engineering assistance
- Robin Schmidt – mastering
- Chris Bigg – cover design
- Martin Masai Andersen – photography

== Charts ==
Chart performance for Doggerel
Chart (2022)	Peak position
Australian Albums (ARIA)	73
Austrian Albums (Ö3 Austria)	55
Belgian Albums (Ultratop Flanders)	19
Belgian Albums (Ultratop Wallonia)	16
Dutch Albums (Album Top 100)	98
French Albums (SNEP)	23
German Albums (Offizielle Top 100)	18
Irish Albums (Official Charts)	34
Portuguese Albums (AFP)	33
Scottish Albums (Official Charts)	4
Spanish Albums (Promusicae)	36
Swiss Albums (Schweizer Hitparade)	33
UK Albums (Official Charts)	13
UK Independent Albums (Official Charts)	4
US Independent Albums (Billboard)	43
US Top Album Sales (Billboard)	16
