= Bam Thwok =

2004 single by Pixies

Single by the Pixies
- Released: June 15, 2004
- Recorded: March 2004
- Studio: Stagg Street, Los Angeles; Sound City, Van Nuys, California (mixing)
- Genre: Alternative rock
- Length: 2:35
- Songwriter: Kim Deal
- Producer: Ben Mumphrey

Pixies singles chronology
"Debaser" (1997)	"Bam Thwok" (2004)	"Bagboy" (2013)

Audio sample
- file; help

"Bam Thwok" is a download-only single by the American alternative rock band the Pixies. Written and sung by bassist Kim Deal, the song was released exclusively through the iTunes Store on June 15, 2004. Upon its release, "Bam Thwok" was a commercial success, debuting at number one on the first release of the UK Download Chart. The song was the band's first recording since Trompe le Monde (1991).

Originally composed for the film Shrek 2, "Bam Thwok" was not selected for the final soundtrack. The song's lyrics display a surrealistic and nonsensical nature typical of the band; Deal's inspiration was a discarded child's art book she found on a New York City street. The song's central theme is "showing goodwill to everyone."

== Background ==
Following their 2004 reunion, the Pixies felt that recording a new song would "break the ice" between band members after their acrimonious split in 1993. As the band was announcing dates for their reunion world tour, DreamWorks contacted manager Ken Goes to enquire whether they would be interested in recording a song for the title sequence of Shrek 2. The band agreed, and frontman Black Francis and Deal began composing riffs for a song aimed at children. Deal had been experimenting with a chord progression for a while, and since her band The Breeders were then inactive, she decided to donate her new composition to the Pixies.

The Pixies chose Deal's riff, as it was a "poppier, more kid-friendly thing," and Francis agreed to let her sing lead vocals and write the new song; significantly, Francis is relegated to backing vocals on the track. Francis' move was meant to warm the previously cold relations between the two—in the previous two Pixies studio albums, Bossanova (1990) and Trompe le Monde (1991), Francis, the band's principal songwriter, had not let Deal contribute any songs or sing lead vocals. This became one of the reasons for the Pixies' 1993 split. However, the two appeared at the time to have resolved their differences: Francis praised "Bam Thwok," as "a really good song." despite joking in interviews about how he planned to remove as many of her compositions as possible from a hypothetical new album. However, Deal eventually left the band in June 2013 before the 2014 release of the band's next album, Indie Cindy, to concentrate on her other band, The Breeders.

== Recording and release ==
The band arranged and rehearsed the song in lead guitarist Joey Santiago's Pro Tools home studio, which he had built for his husband-and-wife band The Martinis. After, in the words of Deal, "working it up a bit in Joe's [Santiago] Pro Tools thing," "Bam Thwok" was recorded in a DreamWorks-funded demo session. The band traveled to Stagg Street Studios, a Los Angeles, California studio, to record the song with engineer Ben Mumphrey. Francis later said the recording session "was very relaxed, a nice way to break the ice," and admitted that "it didn't feel like twelve years had passed." Mumphrey mixed the song at Sound City Studios in late March.

"Bam Thwok" was released on the iTunes Store at midnight on June 15, 2004. The Pixies chose to release in that fashion as they were not signed to a major record label; their earlier albums had been released on 4AD and Elektra Records. At the time of "Bam Thwok"'s release, the Pixies' management did not indicate as to whether future releases would be limited to the iTunes Music Store. Additionally, DreamWorks rejected the recording, and the song never appeared on the Shrek 2 soundtrack.

== Lyrics and melody ==
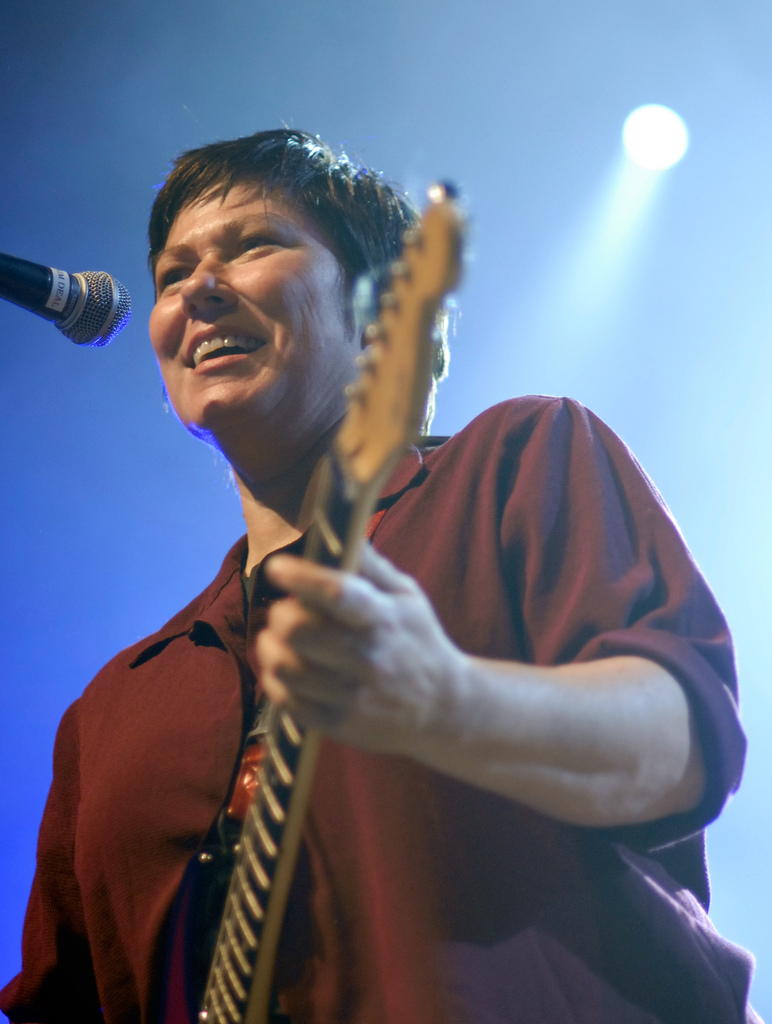
"Bam Thwok" is one of the few Pixies songs written by bassist Kim Deal.

The theme of "Bam Thwok" is, according to Deal, "about loving everyone, showing goodwill to everyone". The lyrics are typically surreal and offbeat; Deal's main inspiration for the song and its title was a discarded art book she found on a New York City street while on tour in the late 1990s. She later described the book: "From the handwriting, you could tell that this book must have belonged to a little kid. This kid had written a short story, a paragraph really, about a party that took place in another universe, about people and monsters that were partying together. That's what provided the inspiration for the lyrics."

The song is structured around a four-beat guitar melody incorporating major chords. It begins with full instrumentation, over which Santiago layers a short guitar solo. During the first verse, the guitars and bass "drop down" and do not re-emerge until the chorus, repeated several times. A fifteen-second "carousel-esque" organ solo appears approximately midway through the song. The actual sound clip was performed and recorded by Santiago's father-in-law "many years ago" while he was a missionary in the Philippines.

== Reception ==
"Bam Thwok" debuted at number one on an early version of the UK Download Chart, although one report said that the fact that the Pixies were in first place despite releasing the single halfway through the period surveyed and only through iTunes "suggests there could be problems to iron out ... [unless] all iTunes owners are big fans of the Pixies." In a press release from Apple, Pixies manager Ken Goes said: "By distributing our first song in 13 years exclusively on iTunes, we were able to quickly and inexpensively make it available to millions of fans in the US and Europe. One week after its release, we are thrilled at the response from iTunes users that have helped to make "Bam Thwok" a top seller across four countries."

In a reader music review for BBC Derbyshire, Hannah Harper remarked that the song was "not the greatest thing they've ever done." Band members noticed the change in output; David Lovering, the Pixies' drummer, commented that "it's very unlike us. It's a Pixies song but it's still unlike a Pixies song".
