= Head Carrier =

Studio album by Pixies
- Released: September 30, 2016
- Recorded: February–March, 2016
- Studios: RAK, London
- Genres: Alternative rock; indie rock; pop rock
- Length: 33:48
- Labels: Pixiesmusic; PIAS
- Producer: Tom Dalgety

Pixies chronology
Indie Cindy (2014)	Head Carrier (2016)	Beneath the Eyrie (2019)

Singles from Head Carrier
- 1. "Um Chagga Lagga" Released: July 6, 2016; 2. "Tenement Song" Released: September 5, 2016; 3. "Classic Masher" Released: November 24, 2016; 4. "Bel Esprit" Released: March 17, 2017

Professional ratings
Aggregate scores
Source	Rating
AnyDecentMusic?	5.9/10
Metacritic	64/100
Review scores
Source	Rating
AllMusic	3/5 stars
The A.V. Club	C
The Guardian	2/5 stars
The Independent	3/5 stars
Mojo	4/5 stars
NME	4/5
Pitchfork	5.5/10
Q	4/5 stars
Rolling Stone	3/5 stars
Uncut	6/10

Head Carrier is the sixth studio album by the American alternative rock band the Pixies, released on September 30, 2016, on Pixiesmusic and PIAS. Produced by Tom Dalgety, and recorded at RAK Studios in London, the album is the first to feature new band member Paz Lenchantin on bass guitar, who joined the band in 2014 to tour in support of its previous album, Indie Cindy.

The album's title references a cephalophore, a saint carrying his own head, more specifically St. Denis of Paris.

== Background ==
Production started around late 2015 after finding a new producer, Tom Dalgety (replacing previous producer Gil Norton, who had worked on the Pixies last four albums). The band met with him as they were recording demos for the followup of their 2014 album Indie Cindy. Previously they had debuted a number of songs live that they were testing as potential tracks for their next album. Such tracks included "Super Lecker", "O' Little Cloud", and "Down to Tulom".

This album marks the first full appearance of bassist Paz Lenchantin (formerly of A Perfect Circle and Zwan), after replacing previous bassist Kim Deal, who left the band in 2013. Lenchantin had previously been featured on the bonus track "Women of War" (a vinyl bonus track off of Indie Cindy), as well as live tracks for the deluxe edition of the same album. Lenchantin had previously been the touring bassist, but was promoted to full-time member starting with this album. She also has a writing credit and lead vocals for the song "All I Think About Now", which was written about Kim Deal and takes on the form of a thank-you letter.

The album was officially announced on July 6, 2016 with the release of its first single "Um Chagga Lagga". This was followed up by a second single, "Talent", on August 17, 2016. The whole album was streamed on NPR starting on September 22, 2016.

== Track listing ==
All tracks are written by Black Francis, except where noted

Head Carrier track listing
No.	Title	Writer(s)	Length
1.	"Head Carrier"		3:36
2.	"Classic Masher"		2:37
3.	"Baal's Back"		1:54
4.	"Might as Well Be Gone"		2:48
5.	"Oona"		3:38
6.	"Talent"		2:12
7.	"Tenement Song"		2:57
8.	"Bel Esprit"		3:12
9.	"All I Think About Now"	Francis, Paz Lenchantin	3:07
10.	"Um Chagga Lagga"		3:00
11.	"Plaster of Paris"		2:06
12.	"All the Saints"		2:41
Total length:			33:48

== Personnel ==
Credits adapted from the album's liner notes.

- Black Francis
- Joey Santiago
- David Lovering
- Paz Lenchantin

Technical

- Tom Dalgety – production, recording, mixing
- Rob Brinkman – recording assistant
- Vaughan Oliver – art direction, design
- Joshua Price – design assistance
- Ian Pollock – illustrations

== Charts ==
=== Weekly charts ===
Weekly chart performance for Head Carrier
Chart (2016)	Peak position
Australian Albums (ARIA)	23
Austrian Albums (Ö3 Austria)	37
Belgian Albums (Ultratop Flanders)	5
Belgian Albums (Ultratop Wallonia)	14
Dutch Albums (Album Top 100)	13
French Albums (SNEP)	12
German Albums (Offizielle Top 100)	32
Irish Albums (IRMA)	31
New Zealand Albums (RMNZ)	20
Portuguese Albums (AFP)	21
Scottish Albums (Official Charts)	5
Spanish Albums (Promusicae)	23
Swiss Albums (Schweizer Hitparade)	32
UK Albums (Official Charts)	7
US Billboard 200	72

=== Year-end charts ===
Year-end chart performance for Head Carrier
Chart (2016)	Position
Belgian Albums (Ultratop Flanders)	135
