= Smitten (The Martinis album) =

Studio album by The Martinis
- Released: April 4, 2004
- Recorded: 2004
- Genre: Alternative rock
- Length: 33:40
- Label: Cooking Vinyl
- Producers: Bradley Cook; Blag Dahlia

The Martinis chronology
The Smitten Sessions E.P. (2004)	Smitten (2004)

Singles from Smitten
- 1. "Out Upon the Road" Released: 2004

Professional ratings
Review scores
Source	Rating
Allmusic	4/5 stars
The Guardian	2/5 stars
Pitchfork	3.7/10

Smitten is the second studio album by American alternative rock band The Martinis. It was released on May 4, 2004 by Cooking Vinyl, remaining as the band's final studio album release.

The record is often regarded as similar-sounding to the work by alternative rock band, the Pixies, as the guitarist, Joey Santiago is a member of both bands. The record also features drums by Josh Freese, a member of The Vandals and A Perfect Circle. The album took over two years to create.

== Recording ==
Santiago said working with producer Dahlia "was a little rough at times. I don't know if he knows how to treat a woman. We had a little misunderstanding perhaps, but I don't think I misunderstood anything. We just had to let him go at one point. There were a bunch of warnings about being disrespectful. I mean to call him and tell him overall it was a good job."

== Track listing ==
All tracks are written by The Martinis.

No.	Title	Length
1.	"Flyer"	1:53
2.	"Right Behind You"	3:37
3.	"You Are the One"	3:20
4.	"New Scene"	3:43
5.	"Out Upon the Road"	3:17
6.	"Wishful Thinking"	2:47
7.	"Walls of Silence"	3:09
8.	"Invisible"	3:24
9.	"Big Three Wheeler"	2:30
10.	"People in the World"	3:02
11.	"Into the Meadow"	3:18

== Credits ==
=== The Martinis ===
- Linda Mallari – lead vocals, piano, guitar
- Joey Santiago – guitars

=== Additional musicians ===
- Paul De Lisle – bass guitar
- Miiko Watanabe – bass guitar
- Josh Freese – drums, percussion
- Ben Mize – drums, percussion
- Dean Martin Hovey – bells, whistles
- Lisa Mallari Dussinger – backing vocals

=== Production ===
- Bradley Cook – producer, mixer
- Blag Dahlia – producer, mixer
