= Beneath the Eyrie =

Studio album by Pixies
- Released: September 13, 2019
- Recorded: 2018–2019
- Studio: Dreamland (Hurley, New York)
- Genre: Indie rock; gothic rock; alternative rock
- Length: 38:52
- Label: BMG/Infectious
- Producer: Tom Dalgety

Pixies chronology
Head Carrier (2016)	Beneath the Eyrie (2019)	Doggerel (2022)

Singles from Beneath the Eyrie
- 1. "On Graveyard Hill" Released: June 3, 2019; 2. "Catfish Kate" Released: August 6, 2019

Alternative cover
- Deluxe Edition cover

Beneath the Eyrie is the seventh studio album by American alternative rock band Pixies, released on September 13, 2019, by BMG/Infectious. Produced by Tom Dalgety, and preceded by the singles "On Graveyard Hill" and "Catfish Kate", the album was recorded in Dreamland Recording Studios, a remote, converted church in upstate New York. The band were influenced by their Gothic surroundings during the writing and recording process, with vocalist and guitarist Black Francis stating: "I wanted to intermingle with the spirit world, with life and death and with the mystical and a more surreal landscape."

== Recording and release ==
The album was produced by Tom Dalgety, who had previously worked with the band on their 2016 album Head Carrier. Its release was preceded by lead single "On Graveyard Hill" on June 3, 2019, followed by second single "Catfish Kate" on August 6.

The album's title was inspired by an eagle's nest discovered at the back of the converted church that the band were recording in: "There was an old train track from the 1800s that was all grown in. When you walk to the train track you can get a glint of a giant eagle’s nest, a bald eagle’s nest. It’s huge, quite a sight."

The album's cover was designed by Vaughan Oliver, who had designed all of Pixies' album artwork since Come On Pilgrim in 1987. Beneath the Eyrie was Oliver's last collaboration with the band before his death in December 2019.

The Deluxe Edition of the album was released on February 24, 2020.

=== Promotion ===
Leading up to the album, the 12-episode series It’s a Pixies Podcast (originally entitled Past Is Prologue), hosted by Tony Fletcher, began releasing episodes on June 27, detailing the recording of each song. The final episode was released on September 12.

On September 5, the band performed "Catfish Kate" on The Late Show with Stephen Colbert.

The band planned a world tour in support of the album planned for Europe, North America, and Australasia throughout the remainder of 2019 and into 2020. At the Australasian shows, the band were to perform Come On Pilgrim and Surfer Rosa in their entirety. These were largely cancelled, however, due to the COVID-19 pandemic.

== Critical reception ==
Professional ratings
Aggregate scores
Source	Rating
Metacritic	70/100
Review scores
Source	Rating
AllMusic	4/5 stars
Clash	8/10
DIY	3.5/5 stars
The Guardian	3/5 stars
The Independent	4/5 stars
NME	4/5 stars
The Observer	2/5 stars
Pitchfork	6.7/10
PopMatters	7/10
Rolling Stone	3/5 stars

According to the review aggregator Metacritic, Beneath the Eyrie received "generally favorable reviews" based on a weighted average score of 70 out of 100 from 21 critic scores. Many considered the album their best since reforming in 2004, but most critics agreed that the album would not win over any fans of the band's earlier work. Consequence of Sound described the album as "a no-bullshit sugar-snort of riffs and melodies that neither dip much in quality nor come close to scaling past heights." Many praised the direction into more pop-inspired, mellow tracks. PopMatters described the album as the "portrait" of the band's "musical progression and an arresting glimpse of the group in this contemporary musical moment." Pitchfork described some of the songs as sounding like possible b-sides to their third album Bossanova. However, in a negative review, The Observer said that although the album is better than many of the bands the Pixies inspired, "it isn't terribly good either." Reviewing the album for AllMusic, Heather Phares claimed that, "Spookier and more fun, as well as looser and more cohesive than the band's two previous albums, Beneath the Eyrie isn't just the best Pixies 2.0 album to date -- it suggests they just might be stepping out of the shadow of their legendary past."

== Track listing ==
All tracks written by Black Francis, except where noted.

1. "In the Arms of Mrs. Mark of Cain" – 4:13
2. "On Graveyard Hill" (Francis, Paz Lenchantin) – 3:25
3. "Catfish Kate" – 3:08
4. "This Is My Fate" – 3:20
5. "Ready for Love" – 2:33
6. "Silver Bullet" – 3:44
7. "Long Rider" (Francis, Lenchantin) – 3:32
8. "Los Surfers Muertos" (Francis, Lenchantin) – 2:54
9. "St. Nazaire" – 2:27
10. "Bird of Prey" – 2:37
11. "Daniel Boone" – 4:52
12. "Death Horizon" – 2:07

Japanese edition bonus track

13. "Caught in a Dream" (Demo) – 2:56

Beneath the Eyrie LP 2

The deluxe boxset edition of Beneath the Eyrie included a second vinyl, LP 2 (Demos), with nine new demo tracks. The tracks were later made available on streaming platforms. All songs written by Black Francis.

1. "The Good Works of Cyrus" – 2:08
2. "Please Don't Go" – 2:53
3. "Chapel Hill" – 1:20
4. "Caught in a Dream" – 2:48
5. "Mal De Mer" – 2:29
6. "Hey, Debussy" – 3:21
7. "Under the Marigold" – 3:26
8. "How I Learned to Earn Rewards" – 2:57
9. "I Just Can't Break It to You" – 3:38

== Personnel ==
Pixies

- Black Francis – guitar, vocals
- Joey Santiago – guitar
- David Lovering – drums
- Paz Lenchantin – bass guitar, backing vocals

Technical personnel

- Tom Dalgety – production, engineering, mixing at Psalm Studios in Wiltshire, additional prepared piano and percussion
- Ariel Shafir – engineering
- Ian Sopko – engineering assistance
- Ken Helmlinger – engineering assistance
- John Davis – mastering at Metropolis

Artwork

- Vaughan Oliver – art direction
- Simon Larbalestier – photography
- Michael Speed – design

== Charts ==
Chart (2019)	Peak position
Australian Albums (ARIA)	36
Austrian Albums (Ö3 Austria)	41
Belgian Albums (Ultratop Flanders)	17
Belgian Albums (Ultratop Wallonia)	21
Czech Albums (ČNS IFPI)	85
French Albums (SNEP)	21
German Albums (Offizielle Top 100)	22
Irish Albums (IRMA)	7
Italian Albums (FIMI)	97
Japanese Albums (Oricon)	101
Portuguese Albums (AFP)	12
Scottish Albums (OCC)	3
Spanish Albums (Promusicae)	15
Swiss Albums (Schweizer Hitparade)	26
UK Albums (OCC)	7

== See also ==
- List of 2019 albums
