= The Night the Zombies Came =

Studio album by Pixies
- Released: October 25, 2024
- Studios: Guilford Sound (Vermont); Rockfield (Wales); Psalm (Wiltshire)
- Length: 39:54
- Label: BMG
- Producer: Tom Dalgety

Pixies chronology
Doggerel (2022)	The Night the Zombies Came (2024)

Singles from The Night the Zombies Came
- 1. "You're So Impatient" Released: June 3, 2024; 2. "Chicken" Released: July 24, 2024; 3. "Oyster Beds" Released: August 23, 2024; 4. "Motoroller" Released: September 16, 2024

Professional ratings
Aggregate scores
Source	Rating
Metacritic	72/100
Review scores
Source	Rating
AllMusic	3.5/5 stars
The Guardian	2/5 stars

The Night the Zombies Came is the ninth studio album by American alternative rock band Pixies, released on October 25, 2024, by BMG Rights Management. It was produced by Tom Dalgety and preceded by the single "You're So Impatient".

It is the band's first album with bass guitarist and backing vocalist Emma Richardson, who replaced Paz Lenchantin in March 2024.

== Track listing ==
All tracks are written by Black Francis, except for "Hypnotised" and "I Hear You Mary", co-written with Joey Santiago.

The Night the Zombies Came track listing
No.	Title	Length
1.	"Primrose"	2:35
2.	"You're So Impatient"	2:09
3.	"Jane (The Night the Zombies Came)"	2:52
4.	"Chicken"	4:23
5.	"Hypnotised"	3:05
6.	"Johnny Good Man"	3:28
7.	"Motoroller"	2:42
8.	"I Hear You Mary"	3:14
9.	"Oyster Beds"	2:10
10.	"Mercy Me"	3:55
11.	"Ernest Evans"	2:42
12.	"Kings of the Prairie"	2:42
13.	"The Vegas Suite"	3:44
Total length:		39:54

== Personnel ==
Pixies

- Black Francis – guitar, lead vocals
- Joey Santiago – lead guitar, backing vocals
- David Lovering – drums, percussion, backing vocals
- Emma Richardson – bass guitar, backing vocals

Additional musician

- Tom Dalgety – Farfisa organ, Moog

Production

- Tom Dalgety – production, mixing, engineering
- Dave Snyder – engineering assistance
- Matt Hall – engineering assistance
- Joe Jones – engineering assistance
- Robin Schmidt – mastering

Artwork

- Michael Speed – art direction, design
- Ozgur Gorgun – CG art, photography

== Charts ==
Chart performance for The Night the Zombies Came
Chart (2024)	Peak position
Austrian Albums (Ö3 Austria)	61
Belgian Albums (Ultratop Flanders)	29
Belgian Albums (Ultratop Wallonia)	31
French Albums (SNEP)	59
German Albums (Offizielle Top 100)	27
Irish Albums (IRMA)	97
Spanish Albums (Promusicae)	92
Swiss Albums (Schweizer Hitparade)	41
Scottish Albums (Official Charts)	3
UK Albums (Official Charts)	22
UK Independent Albums (Official Charts)	4
US Top Album Sales (Billboard)	32
