= David Lovering =

American musician and magician (born 1961)

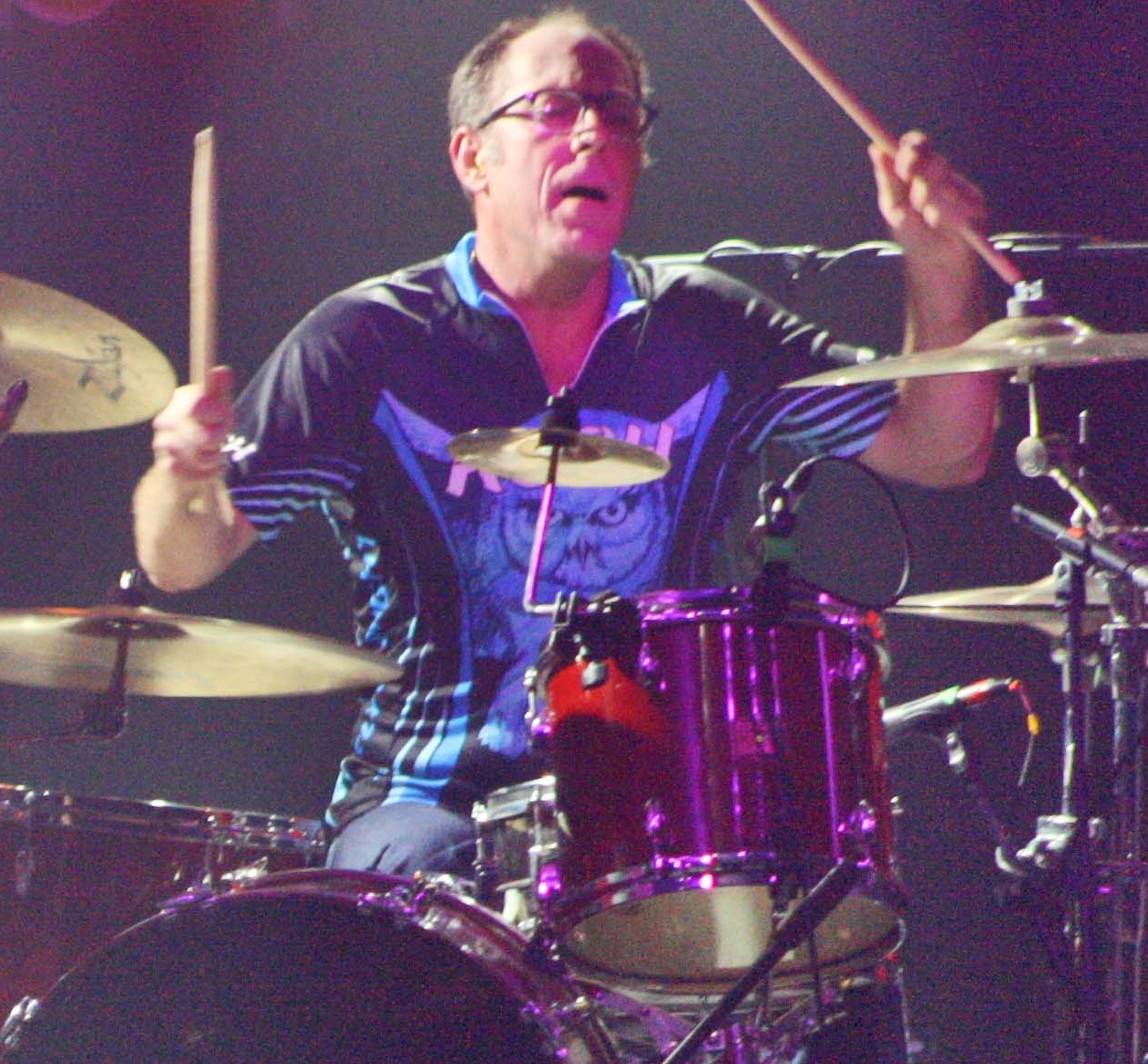
- Lovering performing in 2010

Background information
- Also known as: The Scientific Phenomenalist
- Born: David Sullivan Lovering; December 6, 1961 (age 64); Winchester, Massachusetts, U.S.
- Genres: Alternative rock, indie rock, noise pop, noise rock
- Occupation: Drummer
- Instruments: Drums, guitar, bass guitar, vocals
- Years active: 1986–present
- Label: 4AD
- Website: www.davidlovering.com

David Sullivan Lovering (born December 6, 1961) is an American musician and magician. He is best known as the drummer for the alternative rock band Pixies, which he joined in 1986. After the band's breakup in 1993, Lovering drummed with several other acts, including The Martinis, Cracker, Nitzer Ebb and Tanya Donelly. He also pursued a magic career as the Scientific Phenomenalist, performing scientific and physics-based experiments on stage. When the Pixies reunited in 2004, Lovering returned as the band's drummer.

As a drummer Lovering was inspired by bands from a variety of genres, including Rush and Steely Dan.

== Biography ==
=== Youth and college ===
David Lovering was born in Winchester, Massachusetts and grew up in Burlington, Massachusetts. He learned to play drums during his teenage years and joined his high school's marching band. According to his friend John Murphy, Lovering was always very "drum oriented" in his musical taste. In his high school yearbook entry, Lovering stated his three main ambitions: to be in a rock band, to be an electrical engineer, and to tour with Rush, his favorite band.

After graduating from high school, Lovering studied electronic engineering at the Wentworth Institute of Technology in Boston. He got a job at a Radio Shack store with Murphy, and the pair often played practical jokes while at work. One such incident involved Lovering wiring the store toilet to a fire alarm. After graduating from Wentworth with an associate degree in 1985, he took a job building lasers, and continued to drum in local bands such as Iz Wizard and Riff Raff. A number of different genres of music have influenced him, including bands Steely Dan, Led Zeppelin, and Devo.

=== Pixies ===
On Memorial Day 1985, Lovering attended Murphy and Kim Deal's wedding service. In January 1986 Deal was hired to play bass in the newly formed Pixies, an alternative rock band formed by Charles "Black Francis" Thompson and Joey Santiago. Murphy suggested that Lovering audition for the band – who were still without a drummer. Lovering had stopped drumming by this point and was at first unimpressed by the trio's performance of the band's songs. However, after playing along he agreed to join. Lovering and the band wrote and rehearsed material throughout 1985 and 1986 and performed at small venues in Boston. The band decided to record 18 songs for a demo tape in 1987. Lovering co-wrote one of the tape's songs, "Levitate Me" (his only major writing contribution to any Pixies song) and appeared on the cassette's front cover, jogging naked with his back turned to the camera. "Levitate Me" later appeared on the band's first release Come on Pilgrim, which included seven other songs taken from the demo tape.

The Pixies entered the studio again in 1988 to record their second album Surfer Rosa. Lovering's contribution on songs such as "Bone Machine" – which begins with a 10-second drum solo – "Break My Body" and "River Euphrates" established his steady, accurate style. Doolittle, the band's major label debut, followed in 1989. During the album's recording sessions, Thompson convinced Lovering to sing on "La La Love You", which had been written as a "dig at the very idea of a love song". The album's producer Gil Norton later said that during the sessions Lovering "went from not wanting to sing a note to 'I can't get him away from the microphone'. He was such a showman". In addition to drums and vocals, Lovering played bass guitar on the album's penultimate track, "Silver".

After the release of Doolittle, the relationship between the band members became strained because of constant touring and the pressure of releasing three albums in two years. After the final date of the Doolittle "Fuck or Fight" tour in November 1989, the band was too exhausted to attend their end-of-tour party the following night and shortly afterwards announced a hiatus. After the band reconvened in mid-1990, Lovering moved to Los Angeles along with the rest of the band. The Pixies released two more albums, Bossanova (1990) and Trompe le Monde (1991). Lovering sang lead vocals on the "Velouria" B-side "Make Believe"; a song about his admitted "obsession" with US singer-songwriter Debbie Gibson. The Pixies toured sporadically throughout 1991 and 1992. They eventually broke up in 1992, mostly due to tensions between Thompson and Deal, although it was not publicly announced until 1993.

=== The Scientific Phenomenalist and other projects ===
Following the Pixies' breakup, Lovering drummed with several artists, including Nitzer Ebb, but turned down an invitation to join the Foo Fighters. Lovering then joined Santiago's band The Martinis, appearing on their song "Free" on the soundtrack of Empire Records. However, he soon left the band to become a touring drummer for Cracker. Lovering moved from band to band, drumming with Tanya Donelly's group on 1997's Lovesongs for Underdogs and with Boston band Eeenie Meenie. After facing difficulty finding new work, Lovering gave up the drums and moved into a rented house that banned drumming.

Towards the end of the 1990s, Lovering's friend Grant-Lee Phillips took him to a magic convention. Lovering was very impressed by some of the illusions, and later said "I had to learn how to do it". Mutual friend Carl Grasso invited them to a show at the Magic Castle, a magic-oriented nightclub in Los Angeles. There Lovering met Possum Dixon frontman Rob Zabrecky, and the pair soon became friends. Zabrecky convinced Lovering to apply for a performers' membership to the Magic Castle. After gaining his membership, Lovering reinvented himself as "The Scientific Phenomenalist". His act combined his electrical engineering knowledge with his stage performance experience. His decision to pursue a career in magic was influenced by the fact that as a musician, he "couldn't top the Pixies". Lovering elaborated: "When [Pixies] broke up [in 1993], it was traumatic because it was something I loved doing and it was suddenly gone. I didn't know what I was going to do in that time off, so I picked magic. You've heard of the starving musician? Well, I was the dying magician, so it's not the wisest career choice! But magic gave me confidence, because with the Pixies, I was behind three people and a drumkit, whereas when I did my first magic show in front of an audience of just six people, I could have wrung my shirt out with sweat!"

As the Scientific Phenomentalist, Lovering performs science and physics experiments in a lab coat while on stage. He shuns traditional magic tricks, and prefers "things that are more mental, using mental powers". He later explained: "It's all kind of upbeat, really weird physics experiments that you'll never see. [...] I'd rather have them [the audience] going 'Is it [magic] or isn't it?' rather than 'It's all science' or 'It's all magic'. So I do kinda weird things that other magicians don't do". Lovering cites sleight-of-hand artist Ricky Jay, mind reader Max Maven and Eugene Burger as influences on his technique. His performances often involve intricate self-built machines.

Lovering became part of The Unholy Three, a trio of magicians that resides at the Magic Castle, and performs "a new wave, alternative, avant-garde kind of magic". He toured his act across the United States as the opener for Frank Black (the new stage name of former Pixies bandmate Thompson), Grant-Lee Phillips, the Breeders and Camper Van Beethoven. He performed his act at the Shellac-curated All Tomorrow's Parties music festival in 2002. He later commented that his performance at the festival was "perhaps my greatest achievement". Lovering resumed drumming, appearing at some Frank Black and the Catholics shows. He also appeared on one track of The Martinis' 2004 album The Smitten Sessions.

=== Pixies reunion ===
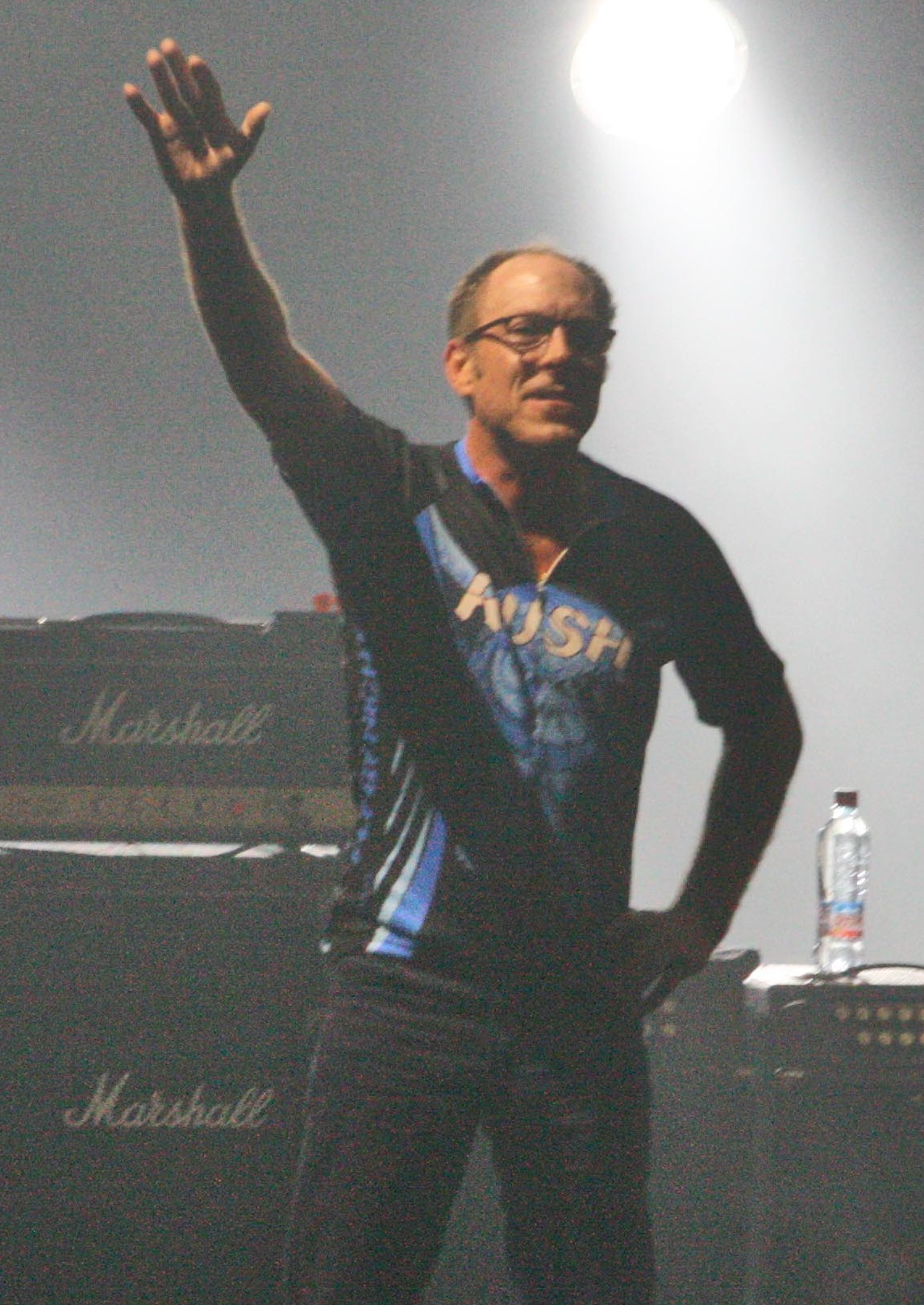
Lovering at Teatro La Cúpula in Santiago, Chile in October 2010

By the summer of 2003, Lovering was feeling depressed. In a 2004 interview, he commented: "I remember I was on the way to the bank, and I was just bummed out—everything, financially, was really a mess for me. I was involved in this relationship that was absolutely terrible. I was bottoming out. And I'm on the way to the bank and my cellphone rings. It's Joe [Santiago]; he says, 'Guess what?'" Santiago had just received a call from Thompson stating his desire to reunite the Pixies. Lovering was overjoyed at the news. He added that "the saddest thing is that when I sat down to rehearse for the Pixies, I couldn't believe that I had given up something that I loved". In 2004 Lovering and the band recorded their reunion single, "Bam Thwok".

Lovering appeared in the 2006 documentary loudQUIETloud, which covered the Pixies' 2004 reunion tour. His father died midway during the tour, and Lovering began drinking heavily as a result. According to Thompson, Lovering "messed up a couple of songs" during a number of live shows. "It was all caught on film", said Thompson, "but they re-edited this to look like it happened in the middle of our tour and it looked like this whole tour careened into this drunken stupor with David. It really wasn't like that at all". He toured with the Pixies throughout 2005 and 2006, while performing at the Magic Castle on Friday nights with The Unholy Three. In 2007, Lovering played a benefit concert for Wally Ingram as part of The Martinis. Later that year, he formed a new band called The Hermetic Order of the Golden Dawn, with Los Angeles musicians Amit Itelman and Oscar Rey.

== Personal life ==
Lovering is a practicing magician; when the Pixies were unable to perform during the COVID-19 lockdown, he began posting videos of his magic tricks on the Pixies’ Instagram account. The first video was posted on April 1, 2021, and became a weekly occurrence called "Magic Mondays". That September, Lovering announced that he was switching the videos to once a month instead of weekly, rebranding them "Magic Monthly".

Lovering has been metal detecting since the age of 11, when he purchased his first metal detector, a Bounty Hunter VLF 840. He began metal detecting in his backyard in Burlington, Massachusetts, finding many colonial era coins. Lovering often metal detects in the hills near his home in Southern California.

== Discography ==
=== with Pixies ===
- Come on Pilgrim (1987)
- Surfer Rosa (1988)
- Doolittle (1989)
- Bossanova (1990)
- Trompe le Monde (1991)
- Indie Cindy (2014)
- Head Carrier (2016)
- Beneath the Eyrie (2019)
- Doggerel (2022)
- The Night the Zombies Came (2024)

=== With Tanya Donelly ===
- Lovesongs for Underdogs (1997)

=== With The Martinis ===
- The Smitten Sessions (2004)

=== With The Everybody ===
- Avatar (2009)
