= Joey Santiago =

Filipino-American guitarist (born 1965)

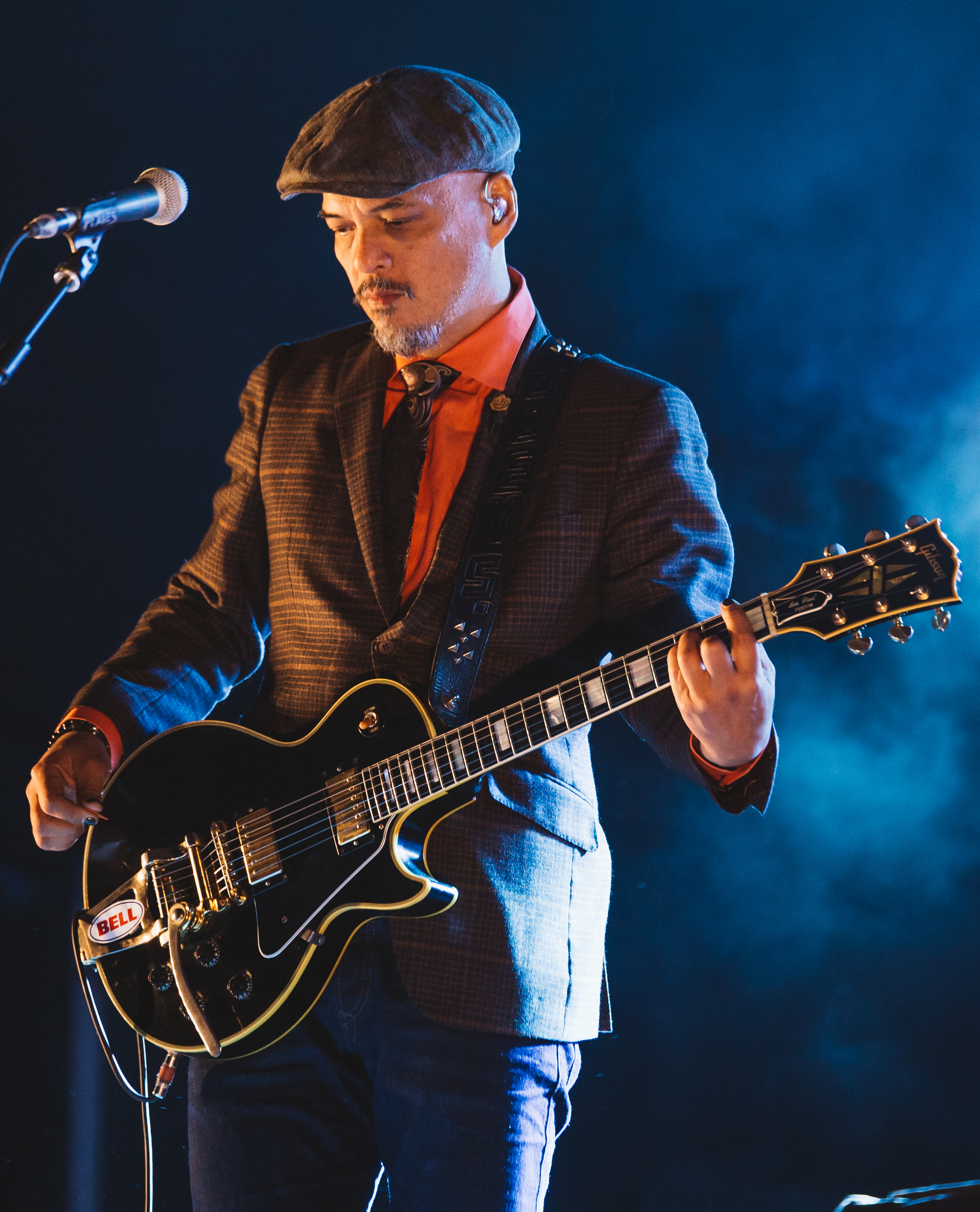
- Santiago performing in 2017

Background information
- Born: Joseph Alberto Santiago; June 10, 1965 (age 61); Manila, Philippines
- Origin: Longmeadow, Massachusetts, U.S.
- Genres: Alternative rock, noise pop, punk rock
- Occupations: Musician, composer
- Instrument: Guitar
- Years active: 1986–present
- Member of: Pixies; The Martinis

Joseph Alberto Santiago (born June 10, 1965) is a Filipino-American guitarist and composer. Active since 1986, Santiago is best known as the co-founder and lead guitarist of the alternative rock band Pixies. After the band's breakup in 1993, Santiago produced musical scores for film and television documentaries, and he formed The Martinis with his ex-wife, Linda Mallari. He contributed to albums by Charles Douglas and former Pixies band-mate Frank Black. Santiago resumed his role as the Pixies' lead guitarist when they reunited in 2004.

Santiago has described his guitar technique as "angular and bent" and cites Les Paul, George Harrison, Chet Atkins, Wes Montgomery, Joe Pass and Jimi Hendrix as major influences on his style. His guitar playing, as part of the Pixies' sound, was held in high regard by critics: MTV's Laurel Bowman commented that Santiago's "sonic plow was the key element in the Pixies' monstrous presence".

== Early life and education ==
Santiago was born in Manila, Philippines, on June 10, 1965, the third of six sons of an anesthesiologist. In 1972, when Ferdinand Marcos declared martial law, the family immigrated to the United States. After two years in Yonkers, New York, the family moved to Longmeadow, Massachusetts, where Santiago attended Longmeadow High School and graduated from Wilbraham & Monson Academy in 1983. His first experience with a musical instrument was playing a Hammond organ at the age of eight, but he never took on the instrument seriously because he had to share it with five brothers. Santiago first played a guitar at the age of nine after he noticed a classical guitar hanging on his oldest brother's wall for decoration. The first song he learned to play was The Velvet Underground's "Rock and Roll".

As a teenager, Santiago became interested in computer programming, naming his first program "Iggy" and his second "Pop" after punk rocker Iggy Pop. He participated in a cycle ride across the United States in aid of charity, but on completing it did not bother to collect the sponsor's money.

After graduating from high school in 1983, Santiago studied at the University of Massachusetts Amherst. He remained without a major as long as the university would permit him to, but eventually chose economics. He met Charles Thompson, an anthropology student and the future Pixies frontman, after he heard Thompson and his roommate playing their guitars. Santiago rushed home to collect his guitar, and was soon playing "non-blues-scale, non-cover-song rock" with Thompson.

Santiago and Thompson shared a room at the start of the second semester. Santiago soon introduced his new roommate to 1970s punk and the music of David Bowie. He later recalled their time together in college: "Charles and I had a suite at the college dorm. We'd go to shows, I remember seeing Black Flag and Angst. Initially, I think we just liked each other. I did notice right away that he was playing music ... He'd write 'em [the songs], and I'd throw my ideas on the guitar." In their second year of college, Thompson traveled to Puerto Rico as an exchange student. After six months there living with a "weird, psycho roommate," Thompson sent Santiago a letter with the words "We gotta do it, now is the time, Joe, we gotta chase our dreams"; Santiago replied, saying "Yes, now's the time." Upon receiving this reply, Thompson decided to return to Amherst to start a rock band with Santiago.

== Career ==
=== Pixies ===
Upon Thompson's return to Massachusetts, the pair dropped out of college and moved to Boston. They both took temporary jobs in warehouses, with Santiago working for a butcher block company. In January 1986, Santiago formed the Pixies with Thompson. Santiago made the choice to play lead guitar over Bass. The pair arrived at a name after Santiago selected the word randomly from a dictionary and liked the definition, "mischievous little elves." They recruited Kim Deal a week later after placing a classified ad in a Boston paper for a bassist "into Hüsker Dü and Peter, Paul and Mary." Drummer David Lovering was later hired on recommendation from Deal's husband.

The Pixies rehearsed throughout 1986, and began performing around Boston in late 1986 and during 1987. The band signed to the English independent record label 4AD in 1987. On meeting the head of the label, Ivo Watts-Russell, Santiago remarked: "All I care about is that you make me famous in the Philippines because all the chicks are really pretty". Watts-Russell later said "that's probably all I ever heard Joey really say," and by that time, Santiago's quietness had been noted by those close to the band. The Pixies' first release, Come On Pilgrim, featured his trademark angular lead guitar on tracks such as "The Holiday Song" and "Vamos".

After the Pixies next two albums, Surfer Rosa (1988) and Doolittle (1989), the relationship between the band members became strained; they were constantly touring and had released three albums in two years. At the end of 1989, the band announced a break. During this time, Santiago visited the Grand Canyon to "find himself." After the band reconvened in 1990, Santiago contributed to the band's later releases, Bossanova (1990) and Trompe le Monde (1991), adopting a surf guitar style in the former. The Pixies eventually broke up in 1992, mostly due to tensions between Francis and Deal, although the breakup was not publicly announced until 1993.

=== The Martinis and composing ===
After the breakup of the Pixies, Santiago went into a depression for the first couple of years but remained on good terms with bandmate Black Francis (who soon adopted the name Frank Black). Black, who was recording his 1993 debut album, Frank Black, contacted Santiago to ask whether he would contribute lead guitar. Santiago agreed, and moved into Black's old apartment in L.A. on a whim. Santiago played lead guitar on a number of Frank Black's solo albums, including Teenager of the Year (1994), and contributed lead guitar to Steve Westfield's 1994 album Mangled. He also formed The Martinis a year later with Mallari. Their recorded output by the end of the 1990s comprised a single song, the self-recorded "Free" (1995), which appeared on the film soundtrack of Empire Records. The band played live only occasionally until 2001.

In the mid-1990s, Santiago began to explore audio editing software. After composing for several independent films, including Crime and Punishment in Suburbia in 2000 (where he collaborated again with Black), Santiago co-scored the Fox Network TV series Undeclared with Michael Andrews. He continued to contribute lead guitar to albums, collaborating with Charles Douglas on his 2004 album Statecraft. He scored the 2003 film The Low Budget Time Machine and wrote two songs, "Birthday Video" and "Fake Purse", for the Showtime television series Weeds in 2005.

Mallari and Santiago continued to write new material as part of the Martinis, but no longer played live. Their debut album, Smitten, took two years to write and was released in 2004; the pair collaborated with a number of musicians, including drummer Josh Freese, during the recording. Santiago described the album as "a lot poppier and quirkier" than the band's previous material. The band simultaneously released The Smitten Sessions, a limited edition EP.

=== Pixies reunion and future projects ===
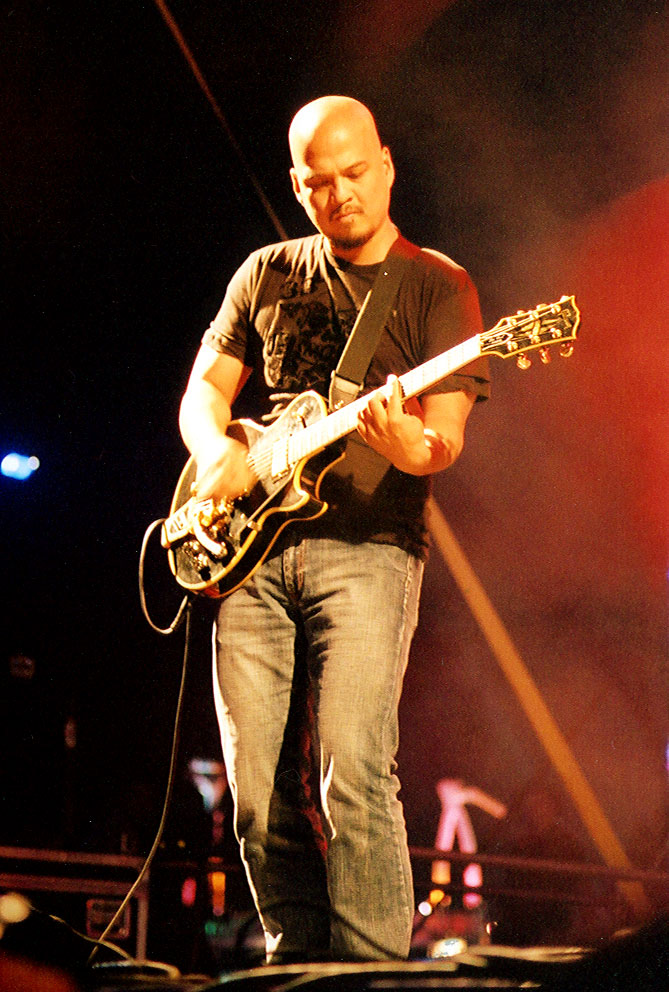
Santiago performing at the San Diego Street Scene Festival in 2005

After the Pixies broke up in 1993, Santiago had stayed in touch with every band member. In the summer of 2003, Black decided to begin reuniting the Pixies and called Santiago first. Santiago later explained: "He called me on my cellphone and I was in Cape Cod visiting family. He said in this coy voice, 'Hey Joey, uh, you been hearin' these rumors that we're getting back together? Gee, I wonder who started it?' I go, 'Charles, did you do that?' and he goes, 'Yeah.'" Santiago then contacted Lovering and Deal to inform them of Black's decision and by the summer of 2004 the band had reunited. DreamWorks asked the Pixies in early 2004 to compose a song for the Shrek 2 soundtrack. They agreed, and early versions of this new song were recorded in Santiago's basement. With his soundtrack experience, the band, in the words of Deal, "worked it up a bit in Joey's Pro Tools thing", before submitting it to the studio. DreamWorks rejected the song, so the band released it as a single, "Bam Thwok".

Aside from the Pixies and The Martinis, Santiago scored the soundtrack of the documentary Radiant City in 2006. He signed with the commercial sound agency Elias Arts in the same year, and focused on composing music for television commercials. In a March 2006 Billboard.com interview, he dismissed the possibility of a new Pixies album for the time being: "I'd only be interested if it happens in an organic manner; if all our schedules are aligned and we're all feeling it. That's the only reason to do it." Santiago also played a benefit concert for drummer Wally Ingram in February 2007 as part of The Martinis; the band's first gig for six years.

== Musical style ==
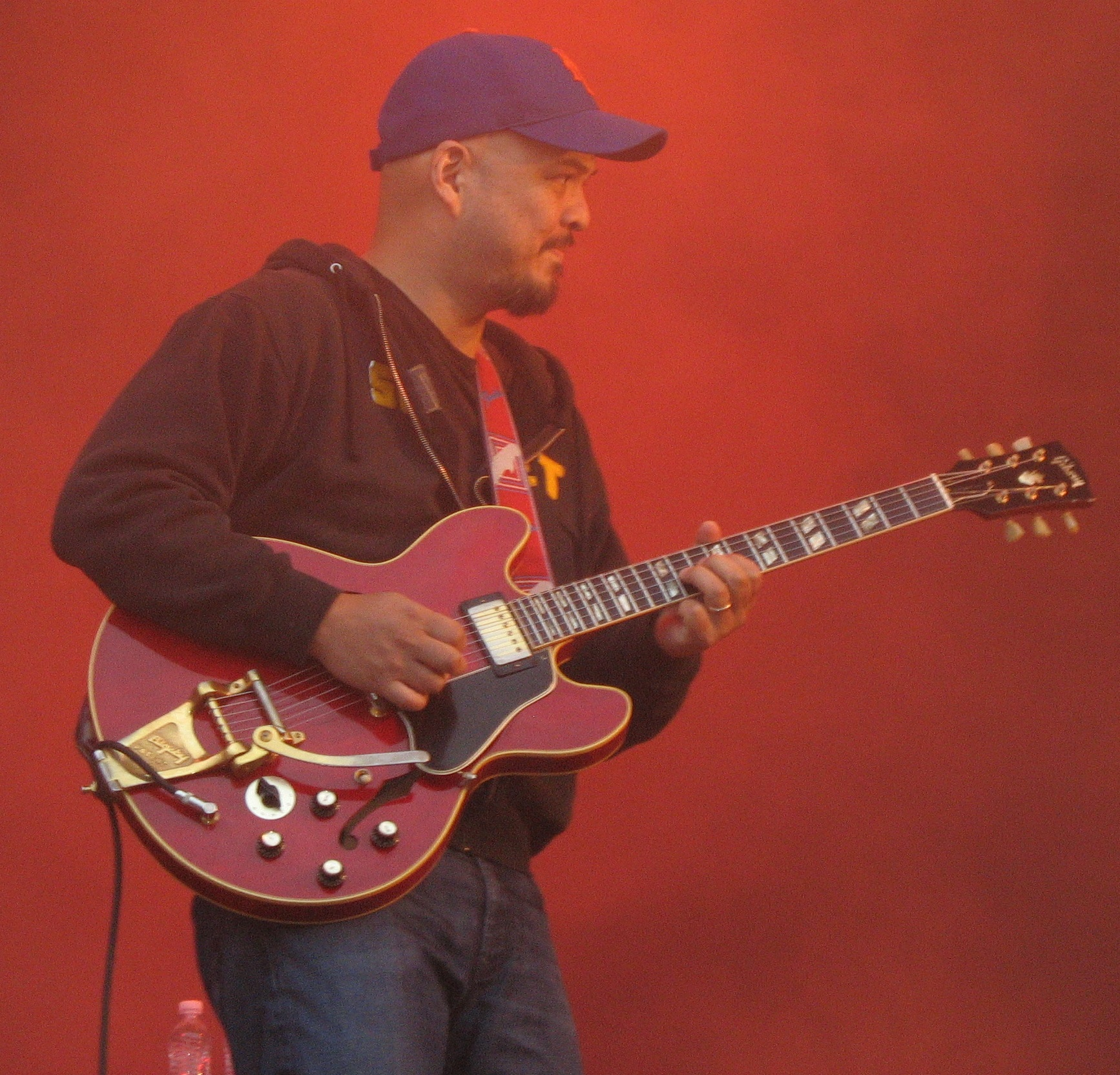
Santiago performing in Stockholm, Sweden in 2009

Santiago describes his guitar playing as "angular and bent," "all derived from guitar moments that perk my ears up". Notable in his style is his use of distortion and feedback to create open spaces. A good example is the intro of "There Goes My Gun". He attributes much of his style to songs he enjoyed when first learning the guitar, such as The Beatles' "Savoy Truffle", where "George Harrison played that bent note that I fell in love with and later milked it for all it was worth." He used such techniques with the Pixies: Doolittle's "Dead" begins with Santiago's guitar "squawking" on an E-flat like "a wounded animal". As Santiago was learning the guitar, he saw himself as a self-conscious amateur, and still speaks of a lack of confidence in his playing.

Santiago, rather than listening to popular radio, borrowed rock and roll records from the public library as he was growing up; he first discovered Les Paul and Jimi Hendrix, who led to jazz guitarist Wes Montgomery. Santiago later commented on Montgomery's influence: "And that's when I said, 'Ah, that's a hook. That's some hooky stuff in the jazz world'". He discovered jazz and country artists such as Joe Pass and Chet Atkins after studying the liner notes of albums. Santiago was directly influenced by the "Hendrix chord", the sharp 9th dominant chord which, in the words of author Ben Sisario, "tapped a hidden rage that matched the horror of Thompson's scream". As a teenager, Santiago listened to classic rock and proto-punk artists such as The Who, The Rolling Stones, The Velvet Underground and Iggy Pop.

His stage antics contrasted with his generally quiet demeanor; he often experimented with his guitar and equipment during songs. Deal's husband, John Murphy, said that during performances of "Vamos", which features guitar feedback throughout, Santiago used to "whack the crap out of his amp", often picking up the amplifier and moving it around. During some solos, Santiago would often pull the guitar up to his mouth and break guitar strings with his teeth.

== Personal life ==
Santiago has two children. He lives in Los Angeles. In 2016, Santiago checked into a rehabilitation center to treat his alcohol and drug issues. He has since become sober.

== Discography ==
Pixies

- Surfer Rosa (1988)
- Doolittle (1989)
- Bossanova (1990)
- Trompe le Monde (1991)
- Indie Cindy (2014)
- Head Carrier (2016)
- Beneath the Eyrie (2019)
- Doggerel (2022)
- The Night the Zombies Came (2024)

Frank Black

- Frank Black (1993)
- Teenager of the Year (1994)
- Dog in the Sand (2001)
- Devil's Workshop (2002)
- Show Me Your Tears (2003)
- Frank Black Francis (additional editing, 2004)

The Martinis

- Smitten (2004)
- The Smitten Sessions (2004)

The Everybody

- Avatar (2009)

Other appearances

Santiago is credited as guitar unless otherwise specified:

- Mangled (Steve Westfield, 1994)
- Stuff (Holly McNarland, 1997)
- It Came from the Barn (producer) (Pajama Slave Dancers, 1997)
- Home Is Where My Feet Are (Holly McNarland, 2002)
- Statecraft (Charles Douglas, 2004)
- Weeds: Music from the Original Series (composed and performed "Birthday Video" and "Fake Purse") (Weeds, 2005)
- In Pursuit Of Your Happiness (Mark Mulcahy, 2005)
- Songs About Time (The Rentals, 2009)
- Twistable, Turnable Man: A Musical Tribute To The Songs Of Shel Silverstein (Various Artists, 2010)
- A Walk with Love & Death (Melvins, 2017)
