= Pixies discography =

Band discography

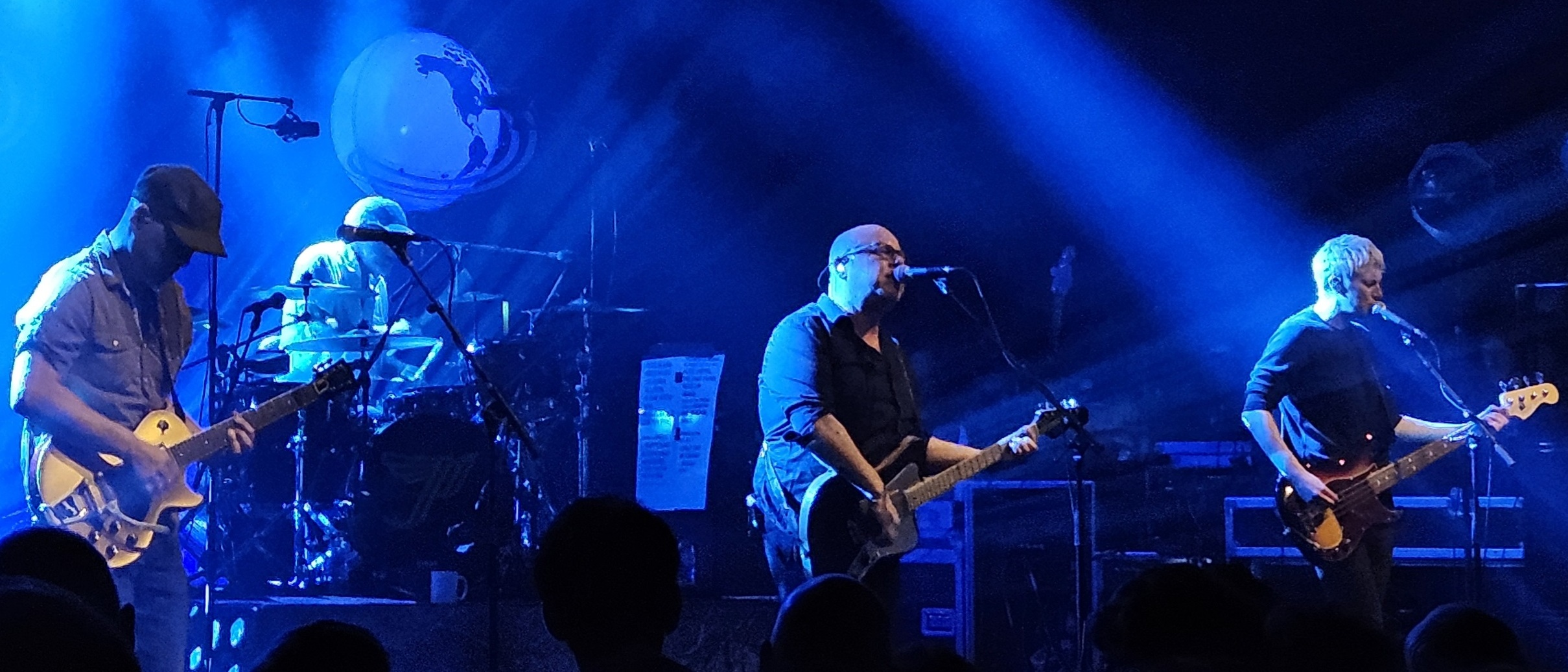
- the Pixies performing in 2024
- Studio albums: 9
- Extended plays: 4
- Live albums: 35
- Compilation albums: 7
- Singles: 26
- Video albums: 4
- Music videos: 9

The discography of the Pixies, an American alternative rock band, includes nine studio albums, 26 singles, seven compilations, one mini-LP, and four EPs as of September 2024.

Pixies formed in Boston, Massachusetts in 1985. Following their 1987 demo tape, the band signed to the English independent record label 4AD. They released Come On Pilgrim, comprising eight songs from their demo tape, in October 1987. Their first full-length album, Surfer Rosa, was released in 1988 on 4AD; an American distribution deal was made with Rough Trade Records several months later. However, Surfer Rosa did not see wide distribution in the United States.

Pixies agreed to a United States distribution deal with Elektra Records before releasing their third album, Doolittle. Doolittle was the most successful album for Pixies, earning them a gold certification from the Recording Industry Association of America in 1995 (along with Surfer Rosa in 2005). Following extensive touring supporting Love and Rockets through 1989, the band released Bossanova in 1990 and Trompe le Monde in 1991, before breaking up in 1993. After reuniting in 2004, Black Francis, Joey Santiago, Kim Deal and David Lovering issued a download-only single, "Bam Thwok", and the Warren Zevon cover, "Ain't That Pretty at All", as well as collaborating with Disc Live to release a number of reunion tour live albums in the same year.

In 2013, a week after announcing the departure of bassist Kim Deal, the band released the song "Bagboy", and then EP1, consisting of four new songs. In 2014, Pixies released EP2 and EP3, and Indie Cindy—a full-length album combining the songs from EP1, EP2 and EP3.

== Albums ==
=== Studio albums ===
List of studio albums, with selected chart positions, sales and certifications
Title	Album details	Peak chart positions										Sales	Certifications
Title	Album details	US	AUS	FRA	GER	IRE	NLD	NZ	SPA	SWE	UK	Sales	Certifications
Come On Pilgrim (mini-album)	Released: September 28, 1987; Label: 4AD, Rough Trade; Format: LP, cassette	—	—	—	—	—	—	—	—	—	—	US: 198,000	
Surfer Rosa	Released: March 21, 1988; Label: 4AD; Format: CD, LP, cassette	—	—	—	—	43	—	—	—	—	—	US: 705,000	RIAA: Gold; RMNZ: Gold
Doolittle	Released: April 17, 1989 (UK); Label: 4AD, Elektra; Format: CD, LP, cassette	98	104	66	—	33	53	18	—	—	8		RIAA: Platinum; BPI: Platinum; RMNZ: Gold; SNEP: Gold
Bossanova	Released: August 13, 1990; Label: 4AD, Elektra; Format: CD, LP, cassette	70	68	—	27	—	30	17	—	45	3	US: 281,000	BPI: Gold; SNEP: Gold
Trompe le Monde	Released: September 23, 1991; Label: 4AD, Elektra; Format: CD, LP, cassette	92	61	—	35	69	26	20	—	43	7	US: 359,000	BPI: Silver; SNEP: Gold
Indie Cindy	Released: April 19, 2014; Label: Pixiesmusic, PIAS; Format: CD, LP, cassette, download	23	21	16	10	4	23	33	29	57	6	US: 34,000	
Head Carrier	Released: September 30, 2016; Label: Pixiesmusic, PIAS; Format: CD, LP, cassette, download	72	23	12	32	31	13	20	23	—	7	US: 8,000	
Beneath the Eyrie	Released: September 13, 2019; Label: BMG/Infectious; Format: CD, LP, cassette, download	— (Note: Beneath the Eyrie did not chart on the Billboard 200, but it peaked at number 19 on Billboard's Alternative Albums chart.)	36	21	22	7	—	—	15	—	7		
Doggerel	Released: September 30, 2022; Label: BMG; Format: CD, LP, cassette, download	—	73	23	18	34	98	—	—	—	13		
The Night the Zombies Came	Released: October 25, 2024; Label: BMG; Format: CD, LP, cassette, download	—	—	59	27	97	—	—	—	—	22		
"—" denotes releases that did not chart.

=== Live albums ===
The Pixies collaborated with Disc Live to release a string of limited edition live albums throughout 2004 as part of their reunion tour. This practice has been repeated with each successive tour, as well as documenting previous tours, using The Show and Coudal Partners/American Laundromat as distributing labels. An incomplete list appears below.

Concert date	Title	Venue	Number of copies pressed
December 15, 1986	Live from the Fallout Shelter	WJUL-FM UMass Lowell	
May 27, 1991	Live from Le Transbordeur, Lyon, France	Le Transbordeur	
June 1, 1991	Live from Espace Médoquine, Bourdeaux, France	Espace Médoquine	
July 31, 1991	Live: Malibu Nightclub, Lido Beach, NY	Malibu	
April 13, 2004	Live in Minneapolis, MN	Fine Line Music Cafe	1000
April 14, 2004	Live in Winnipeg, MB	Burton Cummings Theatre	1000
April 15, 2004	Live in Regina, SK	Conexus Arts Centre	1000
April 17, 2004	Live from Prairieland Park, Saskatoon, SK	Prairieland Park	
April 18, 2004	Live from Red's	West Edmonton Mall	
April 19, 2004	Live from MacEwan Hall, University of Calgary	MacEwan Hall	
April 21, 2004	Live from Victoria Curling Club, Victoria, BC	Victoria Curling Club	
April 22, 2004	Live from Commodore Ballroom, Vancouver, BC	Commodore Ballroom	
May 1, 2004	Live from Coachella, Indio, CA	Coachella festival	
June 2, 2004	Live from Brixton Academy	Brixton Academy	1500
June 3, 2004	Live from Brixton Academy	Brixton Academy	1500
June 4, 2004	Live from Brixton Academy	Brixton Academy	1500
June 5, 2004	Live from Brixton Academy	Brixton Academy	1500
November 11, 2004	Live in Toronto, ON	Molson Amphitheatre	
November 21, 2004	Live in Akron, OH	James A. Rhodes Arena	1000
November 22, 2004	Live in Detroit, MI	State Theatre	
December 6, 2004	the twelve final shows Norfolk	Ted Constant Convocation Center	1000
May 26, 2005	Live from Roseland Theater, Portland, OR	Roseland Theater	
May 28, 2005	Live from the Gorge Amphitheatre, George, WA	Gorge Amphitheatre	
May 30, 2005	Live from the Warfield, San Francisco, CA	The Warfield	
May 31, 2005	Live from Civic Auditorium, San Jose, CA	Civic Auditorium	
June 2, 2005	Live from Wiltern LG Theatre, Los Angeles, CA	Wiltern LG Theatre	
June 5, 2005	Live in Denver, CO	Red Rocks Amphitheatre	
June 7, 2005	Live in Indianapolis, IN	Murat Theatre	
June 8, 2005	Live in Cleveland, OH	Scene Pavilion	
June 9, 2005	Live from Chevrolet Amphitheatre, Pittsburgh, PA	Chevrolet Amphitheatre	
June 11, 2005	Live from Music Midtown, Atlanta, GA	Music Midtown	
June 12, 2005	Live in Raleigh, NC	Disco Rodeo	1000
September 30, 2005	Live in Baltimore, MD	Sonar	1000
October 16, 2005	Live at Voodoo 04	City Park, New Orleans, LA	1500
Various 2004–2005	"Hey" – Live Pixies 2004–2005	Various locations	

=== Compilation albums ===
List of compilation albums, with selected chart positions, sales and certifications
Title	Album details	Peak chart positions									Sales	Certifications
Title	Album details	US	AUS	BEL (FL)	FRA	IRE	NOR	NZ	SWE	UK	Sales	Certifications
Surfer Rosa/Come On Pilgrim	Released: 1988 (UK); Label: 4AD, XL Recordings	—	—	—	—	—	—	—	—	—		BPI: Gold
Death to the Pixies	Released: October 6, 1997; Label: 4AD, Elektra	180	24	6	14	—	32	7	49	20	US: 148,000	BPI: Silver
Pixies at the BBC	Released: July 6, 1998; Label: 4AD, Elektra	—	—	—	—	—	—	—	—	45		
Complete 'B' Sides	Released: May 3, 2001; Label: 4AD	—	—	89	—	46	—	—	—	53		
Wave of Mutilation: Best of Pixies	Released: May 3, 2004; Label: 4AD	161	64	13	—	6	26	—	—	16	US: 316,000	BPI: Gold; RMNZ: Gold
Minotaur	Released: November 24, 2009; Label: 4AD	—	—	—	—	—	—	—	—	—		
Come On Pilgrim… It’s Surfer Rosa	Released: September 28, 2018; Label: 4AD; Formats: 3-CD box set, 3-LP box set	—	—	128	—	—	—	—	—	—		

== EPs ==
List of extended plays, with selected chart positions, sales and certifications
Title	Album details	Peak chart positions		Sales
Title	Album details	US	GER	Sales
Pixies	Released: July 9, 2002; Label: SpinART; Format: CD	—	70	
EP1	Released: September 2, 2013; Format: LP, digital	—	—	US: 89,000
EP2	Released: January 3, 2014; Format: LP, digital	160	—	
EP3	Released: March 24, 2014; Format: LP, digital	—	—	

== Singles ==
List of singles, with selected chart positions
Title	Year	Peak chart positions						Certifications	Album
Title	Year	US Alt.	US AAA	AUS	MEX Ingl.	NZ	UK	Certifications	Album
"Gigantic"	1988	—	—	—	—	—	93		Surfer Rosa
"Monkey Gone to Heaven"	1989	5	—	—	—	—	60	BPI: Silver	Doolittle
"Here Comes Your Man"	1989	3	—	156	—	—	54	RIAA: Platinum; BPI: Silver; MC: Platinum; RMNZ: Platinum	Doolittle
"Velouria"	1990	4	—	153	—	29	28		Bossanova
"Dig for Fire"	1990	11	—	157	—	—	62		Bossanova
"Planet of Sound"	1991	—	—	128	—	35	27		Trompe le Monde
"Alec Eiffel"	1991	—	—	—	—	—	114		Trompe le Monde
"Letter to Memphis"	1991	6	—	—	—	—	—		Trompe le Monde
"Head On"	1991	6	—	—	—	—	—		Trompe le Monde
"Debaser"	1997	—	—	—	—	—	23	BPI: Silver	Death to the Pixies
"Bam Thwok"	2004	—	—	—	—	—	—		Non-album single
"Bagboy"	2013	—	—	—	—	—	—		Indie Cindy
"Um Chagga Lagga"	2016	—	—	—	25	—	—		Head Carrier
"Tenement Song"	2016	—	—	—	39	—	—		Head Carrier
"Classic Masher"	2016	—	25	—	—	—	—		Head Carrier
"On Graveyard Hill"	2019	—	—	—	—	—	—		Beneath the Eyrie
"Catfish Kate"	2019	—	—	—	—	—	—		Beneath the Eyrie
"Hear Me Out" (12" only)	2020	—	—	—	—	—	—		Non-album singles
"Human Crime"	2022	—	—	—	—	—	—		Non-album singles
"There's a Moon On"	2022	—	—	—	—	—	—		Doggerel
"Vault of Heaven"	2022	—	—	—	—	—	—		Doggerel
"Dregs of the Wine"	2022	—	—	—	—	—	—		Doggerel
"You're So Impatient"	2024	—	—	—	—	—	—		The Night the Zombies Came
"Chicken"	2024	—	—	—	—	—	—		The Night the Zombies Came
"Oyster Beds"	2024	—	—	—	—	—	—		The Night the Zombies Came
"Motoroller"	2024	—	—	—	—	—	—		The Night the Zombies Came

== Other charted and/or certified songs ==
Title	Year	Chart positions					Certifications	Album
Title	Year	FRA	MEX Ingl.	NLD	NZ	UK	Certifications	Album
"Where Is My Mind?"	1988	78	—	—	—	199	RIAA: 4× Platinum; BPI: 2× Platinum; MC: 3× Platinum; RMNZ: 3× Platinum	Surfer Rosa
"Wave of Mutilation"	1989	—	—	—	—	—	MC: Gold	Doolittle
"Hey"	1989	—	—	—	—	—	RIAA: Gold; MC: Gold; RMNZ: Gold	Doolittle
"Motorway to Roswell"	1991	—	—	52	—	—		Trompe le Monde
"Talent"	2016	—	34	—	—	—		Head Carrier

== Bootlegs ==
Year	Title
1989	Live in Vienna
1989	Bone Machine
1991	Rough Diamonds
1991	Subbacultcha
1991	Timeless Stars
1994	Give Me Ecstasy

== Music videos ==
Year	Album	Title	Director
1989	Doolittle	"Monkey Gone to Heaven"	n/c
1989	Doolittle	"Here Comes Your Man"	Neil Pollock
1990	Bossanova	"Velouria"	n/c
1990	Bossanova	"Dig for Fire / Allison"	Peter Scammell
1991	Trompe le Monde	"Alec Eiffel"	n/c
1991	Trompe le Monde	"Head On"	n/c
1997	Death to the Pixies	"Debaser"	n/c
2013	Indie Cindy	"Bagboy (Official Video 1)"	Jesse Lamar High Nik Harper
2013	Indie Cindy	"Bagboy (Official Video 2)"	Neirin Best Lianne Pierce
2013	Indie Cindy	"Indie Cindy"	Jesse Lamar High Nik Harper
2013	Indie Cindy	"Andro Queen"	Ondi Timoner
2013	Indie Cindy	"What Goes Boom"	Jonathan Furmanski Matthew Galkin
2013	Indie Cindy	"Another Toe in the Ocean"	Liviu Boar
2014	Indie Cindy	"Blue Eyed Hexe"	Mount Emult
2014	Indie Cindy	"Greens and Blues"	Josh Frank
2014	Indie Cindy	"Snakes"	Mark Locke
2014	Indie Cindy	"Ring the Bell"	Lital Mizel Adi Frimmerman
2014	Indie Cindy	"Silver Snail"	Mount Emult
2014	Indie Cindy	"Magdalena 318"	Judy Jacob
2016	Head Carrier	"Tenement Song"	Krank! Collective
2016	Head Carrier	"Um Chagga Lagga"	Louis Collin
2016	Head Carrier	"Classic Masher"	Paz Lenchantin
2019	Beneath the Eyrie	"On Graveyard Hill"	Kii Arens Bobbi Rich
2019	Beneath the Eyrie	"Catfish Kate"	Neirin Best Lianne Pierce
2019	Beneath the Eyrie	"Long Rider"	Gilbert Trejo
2020	/	"Hear Me Out"	Maximilla Lukacs
2022	/	"Human Crime"	Paz Lenchantin
2022	Doggerel	"Vault of Heaven"	Charles Derenne
2025	The Night The Zombies Came	"Jane (The Night The Zombies Came)"	Liam Maxwell

== DVDs ==
Year	DVD	Comments	Certifications
2004	Pixies	Contains a documentary about the band's influence, early concert videos, their music videos and footage of their 2004 reunion tour.	
2005	Pixies: "Sell Out" Reunion Tour 2004	Playing live at Eurockéenness Festival in Belfort, France. Other performances in the reunion era are included as bonus material.	
2006	loudQUIETloud	Details the band's 2004 reunion tour.	
2006	Acoustic: Live In Newport	Playing live at the 2005 Folk Festival in Newport, Rhode Island.	

== Other appearances ==
Year	Song	Album	Comments
1989	"Winterlong"	The Bridge: A Tribute to Neil Young	Neil Young cover
1990	"Born in Chicago"	Rubáiyát: Elektra's 40th Anniversary	Paul Butterfield Blues Band cover
1991	"I Can't Forget"	I'm Your Fan: The songs of Leonard Cohen	Leonard Cohen cover
2004	"Ain't That Pretty at All"	Enjoy Every Sandwich: Songs of Warren Zevon	Warren Zevon cover
2023	"Crystal Closet Queen"	A Song For Leon: A Tribute To Leon Russell	Leon Russell cover

== See also ==
- List of Pixies songs

== Sources ==
- Frank, Josh; Ganz, Caryn. "Fool the World: The Oral History of a Band Called Pixies." Virgin Books, 2005. ISBN 0-312-34007-9.
- Sisario, Ben. Doolittle 33⅓. Continuum, 2006. ISBN 0-8264-1774-4.
