= Death to the Pixies =

1997 greatest hits album by Pixies

Greatest hits album by Pixies
- Released: October 6, 1997
- Recorded: 1987–1991
- Genre: Alternative rock
- Length: 47:42
- Label: 4AD
- Producer: Steve Albini; Gary Smith; Gil Norton
- Compiler: Chris Staley

Pixies compilations chronology
Death to the Pixies (1997)	Pixies at the BBC (1998)

Alternative cover
- Limited vinyl LP edition cover

Professional ratings
Review scores
Source	Rating
AllMusic	4/5 stars
NME	10/10
Pitchfork	9.2/10
Robert Christgau	(neither)
The Rolling Stone Album Guide	2.5/5 stars
Select	5/5 medals
Uncut	4/5 stars

Death to the Pixies is a compilation album by the American alternative rock band Pixies, released by 4AD in the UK on October 6, 1997, and 4AD/Elektra the following day in the United States to commemorate the 10th anniversary of the band's debut. It covered the years 1987 to 1991. It is now out of print, having been replaced by the 2004 compilation Wave of Mutilation: Best of Pixies. A limited edition of the compilation also included a second CD with a live performance taken from Vredenburg, Utrecht, Netherlands on September 25, 1990.

There was also another version of the limited edition, produced in extremely small quantities, that includes two rare "Black Francis Demos" ("I'm Amazed" and "Broken Face"). This is known as the "Golden Ticket" version, and has GT appended to its catalog number. These demos, recorded in the apartment of producer Gary Smith the day before the band convened to record their full demo at Smith's Fort Apache Studios, feature only Francis singing and playing acoustic guitar (and giving notations to Smith about where the other band members' parts are). The complete "Black Francis Demos" were released as the first disc of 2004's Frank Black Francis 2-CD compilation.

The vinyl release contained all the tracks on the "Golden Ticket" version, spread out over four 10" records. Featuring a different cover, the vinyl version was a limited edition of 9,000 copies printed.

As of 2015, sales in the United States have exceeded 148,000 copies, according to Nielsen SoundScan.

== Track listing ==
All tracks are written by Black Francis, except where noted.

No.	Title	Writer(s)	Album	Length
1.	"Cecilia Ann"	The Surftones	Bossanova (1990)	2:06
2.	"Planet of Sound"		Trompe le Monde (1991)	2:06
3.	"Tame"		Doolittle (1989)	1:56
4.	"Here Comes Your Man"		Doolittle	3:21
5.	"Debaser"		Doolittle	2:52
6.	"Wave of Mutilation"		Doolittle	2:04
7.	"Dig for Fire"		Bossanova	3:02
8.	"Caribou"		Come On Pilgrim (1987)	3:14
9.	"Holiday Song"		Come On Pilgrim	2:14
10.	"Nimrod's Son"		Come On Pilgrim	2:17
11.	"U-Mass"		Trompe le Monde	3:01
12.	"Bone Machine"		Surfer Rosa (1988)	2:34
13.	"Gigantic"	Francis; Kim Deal	Surfer Rosa (single version)	3:13
14.	"Where Is My Mind?"		Surfer Rosa	3:52
15.	"Velouria"		Bossanova	3:40
16.	"Gouge Away"		Doolittle	2:44
17.	"Monkey Gone to Heaven"		Doolittle	2:57

Limited edition bonus – disc two

Disc two was recorded September 25, 1990, at Vredenburg in Utrecht, Netherlands, and produced by VPRO Radio 3.

1. "Debaser" – 2:55
2. "Rock Music" – 1:51
3. "Broken Face" – 1:21
4. "Isla de Encanta" – 1:42
5. "Hangwire" – 2:00
6. "Dead" – 2:30
7. "Into the White" – 3:30
8. "Monkey Gone to Heaven" – 2:58
9. "Gouge Away" – 2:53
10. "Here Comes Your Man" – 3:12
11. "Allison" – 1:16
12. "Hey" – 3:54
13. "Gigantic" – 3:26
14. "Crackity Jones" – 1:35
15. "Something Against You" – 1:46
16. "Tame" – 2:05
17. "Wave of Mutilation" – 3:05
18. "Where Is My Mind?" – 3:37
19. "Ed Is Dead" – 2:52
20. "Vamos" – 4:34
21. "Tony's Theme" – 2:27

Disc two is missing 13 songs from the complete concert.
Here is the 25 September 1990 concert setlist at Muziekcentrum Vredenburg in Utrecht, Netherlands.

1. Cecilia Ann
2. Levitate Me
3. Debaser
4. Rock Music
5. Hangwire
6. Dead
7. There Goes My Gun
8. Monkey Gone to Heaven
9. Isla de Encanta
10. Velouria
11. Into the White
12. Stormy Weather
13. Hey
14. Gigantic
15. Crackity Jones
16. Dig for Fire
17. Dancing the Manta Ray
18. Gouge Away
19. Here Comes Your Man
20. Caribou
21. All Over the World
22. Allison
23. The Happening
24. Broken Face
25. I Bleed
26. Something Against You
27. Tame
28. Is She Weird
29. Wave of Mutilation (UK Surf)
30. Where Is My Mind
31. Ed Is Dead
32. Vamos
33. Tony's Theme
34. Wave of Mutilation

== Bootleg ==
An unofficial alternative vinyl LP titled Death to the Pixies was recorded at the Crystal Palace Bowl Saturday 8 June 1991.

vinyl side one

1. "The Happening"
2. "Allison"
3. "Velouria"
4. "Hang Wire"
5. "Debaser"
6. "Letter to Memphis"
7. "Planet of Sound"
8. "Blown Away"

vinyl side two

1. "Here Comes Your Man"
2. "Where Is My Mind?"
3. "The Holiday Song"
4. "Break my Body"
5. "Motorway to Roswell"
6. "Vamos"
7. "Head On" (The Jesus and Mary Chain cover)

== Charts ==
=== Weekly charts ===
Chart (1997)	Peak position
Australian Albums (ARIA)	24
Belgian Albums (Ultratop Flanders)	6
French Albums (SNEP)	14
New Zealand Albums (RMNZ)	7
Norwegian Albums (VG-lista)	32
Scottish Albums (OCC)	22
Swedish Albums (Sverigetopplistan)	49
UK Albums (OCC)	20
US Billboard 200	180

=== Year-end charts ===
Chart (1997)	Position
Belgian Albums (Ultratop Flanders)	98
