= Wave of Mutilation: Best of Pixies =

Greatest hits album by Pixies
- Released: May 3, 2004
- Recorded: 1987–1991
- Genre: Alternative rock, college rock
- Length: 66:32
- Label: 4AD
- Producer: Steve Albini; Gil Norton; Pixies; Gary Smith

Pixies compilations chronology
Complete 'B' Sides (2001)	Wave of Mutilation: Best of Pixies (2004)	Minotaur (2009)

Professional ratings
Review scores
Source	Rating
AllMusic	4.5/5 stars
Blender	3/5 stars
Drowned in Sound	9/10
NME	8/10
Pitchfork	8.5/10
Robert Christgau	A
The Rolling Stone Album Guide	3/5 stars
Uncut	4/5 stars

Wave of Mutilation: Best of Pixies is a compilation album by Pixies. It was released on May 3, 2004, in the United Kingdom and the following day in the United States alongside a companion DVD featuring a live show, promotional videos and two documentaries. Early batches of the record feature a fault on the track "Hey", where Black Francis' opening shout of "Hey" is missing.

This album replaces 1997's compilation Death to the Pixies in 4AD's catalog, which previously served as the label's "greatest hits" collection for Pixies.

As of 2015, sales in the United States have exceeded 316,000 copies, according to Nielsen SoundScan. In 2006 the album received a diamond certification for 250,000 copies sold in Europe by Independent Music Companies Association.

== Track listing ==
All tracks are written by Black Francis, except where noted.

Wave of Mutilation: Best of Pixies track listing
No.	Title	Writer(s)	Album	Length
1.	"Bone Machine"		Surfer Rosa (1988)	3:03
2.	"Nimrod's Son"		Come On Pilgrim (1987)	2:16
3.	"The Holiday Song"		Come On Pilgrim	2:15
4.	"Caribou"		Come On Pilgrim	3:14
5.	"Broken Face"		Surfer Rosa	1:29
6.	"Gigantic"	Francis; Kim Deal	Surfer Rosa	3:13
7.	"Vamos"		Surfer Rosa	4:18
8.	"Hey"		Doolittle (1989)	3:28
9.	"Monkey Gone to Heaven"		Doolittle	2:55
10.	"Debaser"		Doolittle	2:51
11.	"Gouge Away"		Doolittle	2:42
12.	"Wave of Mutilation"		Doolittle	2:04
13.	"Here Comes Your Man"		Doolittle	3:21
14.	"Tame"		Doolittle	1:56
15.	"Where Is My Mind?"		Surfer Rosa	3:53
16.	"Into the White"		Here Comes Your Man Single (1989)	4:40
17.	"Velouria"		Bossanova (1990)	3:40
18.	"Allison"		Bossanova	1:17
19.	"Dig for Fire"		Bossanova	3:02
20.	"U-Mass"		Trompe le Monde (1991)	3:00
21.	"Alec Eiffel"		Trompe le Monde	2:47
22.	"Planet of Sound"		Trompe le Monde	2:06
23.	"Winterlong"	Neil Young	Dig for Fire Single (1990)	3:08

== Personnel ==
Pixies

- Black Francis – vocals, guitar
- Kim Deal – bass guitar, backing vocals, lead vocals on "Gigantic"
- Dave Lovering – drums
- Joey Santiago – lead guitar

Production

- Steve Albini – tracks 1, 5, 7, 15
- Gary Smith – tracks 2–4, 16, 23
- Gil Norton – tracks 6, 8–14, 17–22

== Charts ==
Chart performance for Wave of Mutilation: Best of Pixies
Chart (2004–2005)	Peak position
Australian Albums (ARIA)	64
Austrian Albums (Ö3 Austria)	43
Belgian Albums (Ultratop Flanders)	13
Belgian Albums (Ultratop Wallonia)	64
Norwegian Albums (VG-lista)	26
UK Albums (OCC)	16
US Billboard 200	161

== Certifications ==
Certifications for Wave of Mutilation: Best of Pixies
Region	Certification	Certified units/sales
Canada (Music Canada)	Gold	50,000^{‡}
New Zealand (RMNZ)	Gold	7,500^{‡}
United Kingdom (BPI)	Gold	100,000^{^}
United States	—	316,000
Summaries
Europe	—	250,000
^{^} Shipments figures based on certification alone.^{‡} Sales+streaming figures based on certification alone.
