= Complete 'B' Sides =

2001 compilation album by Pixies

Compilation album by Pixies
- Released: May 3, 2001
- Recorded: 1988–1991
- Studio: Various studios
- Genre: Alternative rock
- Length: 48:35
- Label: 4AD
- Producer: Gil Norton; Gary Smith; Pixies

Pixies compilations chronology
Pixies at the BBC (1998)	Complete 'B' Sides (2001)	Wave of Mutilation: Best of Pixies (2004)

Professional ratings
Aggregate scores
Source	Rating
Metacritic	89/100
Review scores
Source	Rating
AllMusic	3.5/5 stars
Blender	3/5 stars
Drowned in Sound	10/10
NME	7/10
Pitchfork	9.6/10

Complete 'B' Sides is a compilation album of songs by American alternative rock band Pixies. It features the B-sides for seven out of eight of their UK singles, as well as for one US single, from the 1980s and 1990s. The eighth, "Letter to Memphis", had no B-sides. These singles are:

1. "Gigantic" (1988)
2. "Monkey Gone to Heaven" (1989)
3. "Here Comes Your Man" (1989)
4. "Velouria" (1990)
5. "Dig for Fire" (1990)
6. "Planet of Sound" (1991)
7. "Alec Eiffel" (US, 1991)

The album's booklet also features commentaries for each song by Pixies frontman Black Francis. Of "Velvety Instrumental Version", he writes, "The title implies that there was a version with lyrics, but there wasn't." A non-instrumental version, titled simply "Velvety", would later appear on Frank Black and the Catholics' 2002 album, Devil's Workshop.

== Track listing ==
All songs written by Black Francis unless otherwise noted.

1. "River Euphrates" – 3:23
2. "Vamos" (Live) – 3:28
3. "In Heaven (Lady in the Radiator Song)" (Live) (Peter Ivers, David Lynch) – 1:46
4. "Manta Ray" – 2:39
5. "Weird at My School" – 1:59
6. "Dancing the Manta Ray" – 2:13
7. "Wave of Mutilation (UK Surf)" – 3:00
8. "Into the White" – 4:42
9. "Bailey's Walk" – 2:23
10. "Make Believe" – 1:54
11. "I've Been Waiting for You" (Neil Young) – 2:45
12. "The Thing" – 1:58
13. "Velvety Instrumental Version" – 2:04
14. "Winterlong" (Neil Young) – 3:07
15. "Santo" – 2:16
16. "Theme from Narc" (Brian L. Schmidt) – 1:48
17. "Build High" – 1:42
18. "Evil Hearted You" (Graham Gouldman) – 2:37
19. "Letter to Memphis" (Instrumental) – 2:43
