= List of Pixies tribute albums =

A number of tribute albums to the Pixies, an American alternative rock band, have been recorded since the band's break-up in 1993. Artists featured on the albums range from American rock bands, such as Weezer, OK Go and Eve 6, to lesser-known European bands. The first widely released Pixies tribute album, Death to the Pixies—We're Better!, was released in February 1998 as the result of a Pixies cover contest in the Netherlands that was launched by the magazine Oor, the radio station VPRO and the record label Play It Again Sam.

== Death to the Pixies: We're Better! (1998) ==
Label: Play It Again Sam (Netherlands)

No.	Title	Artist	Length
1.	"Gigamuffin"	Pixels	5:14
2.	"Where Is My Mind?"	Crackity Jones	2:40
3.	"Isla De Encanta"	Persil	1:50
4.	"I Bleed"	Homer	2:47
5.	"Pixies Are Dead (Ed Is Dead)"	Ed	2:13
6.	"Waar Is Mijn Hoofd?"	Koos Kreuk	2:19
7.	"Gigantic"	Brotherhood Foundation	3:45
8.	"Where Is My Mind?"	Miss Universe	4:18
9.	"Is She Weird"	Seedling	4:14
10.	"Hey"	Telefunk	3:57
11.	"I've Been Tired"	Jonus	3:43
12.	"Here Comes Your Man"	Zea	4:05
Total length:			41:05

== Pixies Fuckin' Die! (a tribute) (1999) ==
Label: LifeLike Records

No.	Title	Artist	Length
1.	"Bone Machine"	Hard Candy	3:47
2.	"Alec Eiffel"	An April March	2:27
3.	"Where Is My Mind?"	Underwater	4:24
4.	"U-Mass"	Mollycuddle	5:29
5.	"Dead"	Twinkie	2:04
6.	"Velouria"	Twelve24	4:45
7.	"No. 13 Baby"	Moth Wranglers	4:57
8.	"Allison"	Garageland	2:38
9.	"Gigantic"	Allison With One	4:31
10.	"Subbacultcha"	Engine	2:30
11.	"Distance Equals Rate Times Time"	J Stroke featuring La Loba	4:11
12.	"Tame"	Jarboe and The Trepaners	2:38
13.	"Gouge Away"	Bethany Curve	3:49
14.	"Ed Is Dead"	Melon	3:09
15.	"Into the White"	Drekka	3:37
16.	"Monkey Gone to Heaven"	Bonfire Madigan	3:12
17.	"River Euphrates"	The Interstellars	5:15
18.	"Silver"	Bluebottle Kiss	4:02
19.	"The Holiday Song"	Glass Candle Grenade	2:26
20.	"Wave of Mutilation"	No Wings Fins or Fuselage	3:39
Total length:			1:09:55

== Where Is My Mind? A Tribute to the Pixies (1999) ==
Label: Glue Factory Records

Professional ratings
Review scores
Source	Rating
AllMusic	2/5 stars

No.	Title	Artist	Length
1.	"Allison"	Eve 6	1:24
2.	"Alec Eiffel"	The Get Up Kids	3:01
3.	"Velouria"	Weezer	3:54
4.	"Monkey Gone to Heaven"	Far	5:04
5.	"Trompe Le Monde"	Braid	2:10
6.	"Wave of Mutilation"	Superdrag	2:08
7.	"Manta Ray"	Teen Heroes	3:54
8.	"Tame"	Local H	2:02
9.	"Gigantic"	Reel Big Fish	2:30
10.	"The Holiday Song"	The Siren Six!	2:55
11.	"Where Is My Mind?"	Nada Surf	4:18
12.	"Gouge Away"	The Promise Ring	3:00
13.	"Here Comes Your Man"	Samiam	3:14
14.	"La, La, Love You"	Weston	2:43
15.	"Caribou"	Sense Field	3:58
Total length:			46:15

== tribute to the Pixies (2000) ==
Label: Invisible Records (Japan)

Professional ratings
Review scores
Source	Rating
AllMusic	4/5 stars

No.	Title	Artist	Length
1.	"Trompe le Monde"	Ca-p	2:10
2.	"Debaser"	Beat Crusaders	2:12
3.	"Here Comes Your Man"	Penpals	2:14
4.	"Debaser"	Feed	4:19
5.	"Planet of Sound"	Mo'some Tonebender	2:10
6.	"Wave of Mutilation"	Naht	3:46
7.	"Alec Eiffel"	Drumkan	3:35
8.	"Dead"	Radio Active	3:18
9.	"Levitate Me"	Seafood	4:22
10.	"Bone Machine"	Cowpers	5:09
11.	"Gigantic"	Wakusei	4:08
Total length:			37:23

== hey: A Pixies Tribute (2003) ==
Label: FrankBlack.net users

No.	Title	Artist	Length
1.	"Debaser"	Mother Universe
2.	"Allison"	Bison 6
3.	"Mr. Grieves"	Ledergeist
4.	"Blown Away"	Avelimp
5.	"I've Been Tired"	New Retros
6.	"Subbacultcha"	Grozio
7.	"Planet of Sound"	The Dale Nixons
8.	"Bailey's Walk"	Jim McLuckie
9.	"Bone Machine"	Nunyeit
10.	"Broken Face"	Dave Noisy vs The Claw Machine
11.	"River Euphrates"	zenEQ
12.	"Palace of the Brine"	Jeff America
13.	"Alec Eiffel"	Cameron Brown
14.	"Manta Ray"	Prion
15.	"There Goes My Gun"	Asterid
16.	"Isla De Encanta"	Big Big Love
17.	"All Over the World"	Nam June Robot
18.	"Where Is My Mind?"	Derek Olson
19.	"Monkey Gone to Heaven"	The Cut*off
20.	"Silver"	Mike DiSanto
21.	"The Holiday Song"	Clootie
22.	"Levitate Me"	Perfume & Cigarettes

== La La Love You Pixies! (2004) ==
Label: Düsseldorf (Sweden)

Professional ratings
Review scores
Source	Rating
AllMusic	3/5 stars

No.	Title	Artist	Length
1.	"Distance Equals Rate Times Time"	Doktor Kosmos	0:56
2.	"Here Comes Your Man"	Mattias Alkberg BD	4:33
3.	"The Holiday Song"	Hell on Wheels	4:03
4.	"Broken Face"	Quit Your Dayjob	1:19
5.	"Bird Dream of the Olympus Mons"	Radius	2:46
6.	"Monkey Gone to Heaven"	Hamell on Trial	2:58
7.	"Bone Machine"	Laakso	2:32
8.	"Velouria"	Nathan Larson	3:16
9.	"The Happening"	It's a trick, it's a trick	4:47
10.	"Gigantic"	Hello Goodbye	2:50
11.	"Wave of Mutilation"	David Fridlund och Sara Culle	2:26
12.	"Distance Equals Rate Times Time"	Doktor Kosmos	1:11
Total length:			33:37

== Dig for Fire: A Tribute to Pixies (2007) ==
Label: American Laundromat Records

Professional ratings
Review scores
Source	Rating
AllMusic	3.5/5 stars

No.	Title	Artist	Length
1.	"Ana"	Morning Theft	2:09
2.	"Break My Body"	The Rosebuds	2:08
3.	"Down to the Well"	Dylan in the Movies	3:11
4.	"Wave of Mutilation"	Joy Zipper	3:02
5.	"Gigantic"	OK Go	4:13
6.	"Stormy Weather"	Bedroom Walls	2:53
7.	"Gouge Away"	Mogwai	2:30
8.	"Motorway to Roswell"	Knife & Fork	4:55
9.	"Havalina"	They Might Be Giants	2:37
10.	"Alec Eiffel"	Bunnies	4:06
11.	"Monkey Gone to Heaven"	Elk City	4:11
12.	"Hey (Double Dragon Redux)"	Fashion Victims	3:07
13.	"Here Comes Your Man"	The Commons with Elizabeth Harper	3:24
14.	"Where Is My Mind?"	John Strohm	4:07
15.	"Caribou (Instrumental)"	British Sea Power	6:28
16.	"Subbacultcha"	Superman's Wheelchair	1:59
Total length:			55:00
