= Pixies at the BBC =

Live album by Pixies
- Released: July 6, 1998
- Recorded: 1988–1991
- Genre: Alternative rock
- Length: 35:25
- Label: 4AD
- Producers: Dale Griffin; Miti; Mike Robinson

Pixies compilations chronology
Death to the Pixies (1997)	Pixies at the BBC (1998)	Complete 'B' Sides (2001)

Professional ratings
Review scores
Source	Rating
AllMusic	link
Robert Christgau	link
Select	4/5 stars

Pixies at the BBC is a compilation of BBC radio sessions by the American alternative rock band Pixies. Released by 4AD on July 6, 1998, in the United Kingdom and by Elektra Records on July 14, 1998, in the United States—five years after the band's initial split—it was recorded over several sessions between 1988 and 1991 at the BBC. The album is characterized by its raw, under-produced sound.

On March 8, 2024, 4AD released Pixes at the BBC, 1988–91, a complete compilation on 2 CDs or 3 LPs of all 24 tracks recorded by the band for the BBC during this period.

== Track listing ==
All songs were written by Black Francis except tracks 1 and 15. The final track, "(In Heaven) Lady in the Radiator Song" was written by Peter Ivers and David Lynch for Eraserhead.

1. "Wild Honey Pie" (John Lennon, Paul McCartney) – 1:52
2. "There Goes My Gun" – 1:25
3. "Dead" – 1:30
4. "Subbacultcha" – 2:08
5. "Manta Ray" – 2:15
6. "Is She Weird" – 2:52
7. "Ana" – 2:14
8. "Down to the Well" – 2:31
9. "Wave of Mutilation (UK Surf)" – 2:22
10. "Letter to Memphis" – 2:33
11. "Levitate Me" – 2:18
12. "Caribou" – 3:18
13. "Monkey Gone to Heaven" – 2:57
14. "Hey" – 3:17
15. "In Heaven (Lady in the Radiator Song)" (Peter Ivers, David Lynch) – 1:51

Recording and transmission dates

- Tracks 1, 11, 12, 14 & 15 - Recorded for the John Peel show, May 3, 1988, first transmitted May 16, 1988
- Tracks 2, 3, & 5 - Recorded for the John Peel show, October 9, 1988, first transmitted October 18, 1988
- Tracks 4 & 10 - Recorded for the John Peel show, June 23, 1991, first transmitted August 4, 1991
- Track 6 - Recorded for the John Peel show, June 11, 1990, first transmitted August 10, 1990
- Tracks 7 & 13 - Recorded for the Mark Goodier show, August 18, 1990, first transmitted August 20, 1990
- Tracks 8 & 9 - Recorded for the John Peel show, April 16, 1989, first transmitted May 2, 1989

== Pixies at the BBC, 1988–91 track listing ==
All songs written by Black Francis except as noted below.

1. "Levitate Me" – 2:18 (Note: credited to Black Francis on the sleeve notes of both Pixies at the BBC and Pixies at the BBC, 1988–91 but to Black Francis/Lovering/Walsh on Come On Pilgrim.)
2. "Hey" – 3:18
3. "In Heaven (Lady in the Radiator Song)" (Peter Ivers, David Lynch) – 1:53
4. "Wild Honey Pie" (John Lennon, Paul McCartney) – 1:54
5. "Caribou" – 3:19
6. "Dead" – 1:30
7. "Tame" – 1:58
8. "There Goes My Gun" – 1:27
9. "Manta Ray" – 2:15
10. "Down To The Well" – 2:32
11. "Into the White" – 4:11
12. "Wave of Mutilation" – 2:27
13. "Allison" – 1:21
14. "Velouria" – 3:25
15. "Hang on to Your Ego" (Brian Wilson, Mike Love, Terry Sachen) – 3:19
16. "Is She Weird" – 2:52
17. "Monkey Gone to Heaven" – 2:59
18. "Ana" – 2:15
19. "Allison" – 1:13
20. "Wave Of Mutilation" – 2:11
21. "Palace of the Brine" – 1:39
22. "Letter to Memphis" – 2:34
23. "Motorway to Roswell" – 3:37
24. "Subbacultcha" – 2:07
- Tracks 1–5 recorded for the John Peel show, May 3, 1988, first transmitted May 16, 1988. Produced by Mike Robinson.
- Tracks 6–9 recorded for the John Peel show, October 9, 1988, first transmitted October 18, 1988. Produced by Dale Griffin, engineered by James Birtwistle.
- Tracks 10–12 recorded for the John Peel show, April 16, 1989, first transmitted May 2, 1989. Produced by Dale Griffin, engineered by Mike Walter.
- Tracks 13–16 recorded for the John Peel show, June 11, 1990, first transmitted August 20, 1990. Produced by Pixies, engineered by Guy Fixsen.
- Tracks 17–20 recorded for the Mark Goodier show, August 18, 1990, first transmitted August 20, 1990. Produced by Miti Adhikari.
- Tracks 21–24 recorded for the John Peel show, June 23, 1991, first transmitted August 4, 1991. Produced by Dale Griffin, engineered by James Birtwistle and Paul Roberts.
