= Minotaur (Pixies album) =

Box set by Pixies
- Released: November 24, 2009
- Recorded: March 1987–1991
- Genre: Alternative rock
- Label: Artists in Residence, licensed from 4AD
- Producer: Steve Albini; Gil Norton; Gary Smith

Pixies chronology
Wave of Mutilation: Best of Pixies (2004)	Minotaur (2009)	EP1 (2013)

Professional ratings
Review scores
Source	Rating
Uncut	3/5 stars

Minotaur is a box set of the first five studio releases by Pixies, released on November 24, 2009. The contents include new artwork by the original Pixies designer Vaughan Oliver and photographer Simon Larbalestier. The collection was released as a Deluxe Edition which includes the albums on gold-plated 24k layered CDs with a Blu-ray Disc and a DVD featuring a 1991 Brixton Academy show and all of Pixies' music videos, packaged with a 54-page book. The Limited Edition package comes in a custom clamshell with all the albums on 180-gram vinyl, along with a Giclée print of artwork made for the collection, and a 72-page hardcover book.

== Contents ==
- Come On Pilgrim (1987)
- Surfer Rosa (1988)
- Doolittle (1989)
- Bossanova (1990)
- Trompe le Monde (1991)
