= Debaser =

1997 single by Pixies

- Cover of the Debaser: Studio single.

Single by Pixies

from the album Doolittle
- A-side: "Debaser"
- B-side: "Bone Machine", "Gigantic", "Isla de Encanta"
- Released: July 21, 1997
- Studio: Downtown Recorders (Boston, Massachusetts)
- Genre: Alternative rock
- Length: 2:52
- Label: Elektra
- Songwriter: Black Francis
- Producer: Gil Norton

Pixies singles chronology
"Head On" (1991)	"Debaser" (1997)	"Bam Thwok" (2004)

Audio sample
- file; help

Music video
- "Debaser" on YouTube

"Debaser" is a song by the American alternative rock band Pixies, released in April 1989 as the opening track on their album Doolittle and later as a promotional single following the dissolution of the band.

== Releases ==
The band's 1991 "Head On" single includes a live version of "Debaser" recorded in Chicago on August 9, 1989. The album version of the song was later released as a single in 1997 to promote the Death to the Pixies compilation. A live recording from December 16, 2004 in New York City appears on "Hey" – Live Pixies 2004–2005.

A version of this song was also used in the game DJ Hero 2, remixed with The Prodigy's song "Invaders Must Die"; this mix is available as downloadable content for the game.

== Lyrics and meaning ==
The lyrics of "Debaser" are based on Un Chien Andalou, a 1929 short film by Luis Buñuel and Salvador Dalí. The film includes a scene in which a woman's eye is apparently cut open by a razor, which is referenced in the lyric "slicin' up eyeballs." According to frontman and songwriter Black Francis:

I wish Buñuel were still alive. He made this film about nothing in particular. The title itself is a nonsense. With my stupid, pseudo-scholar, naive, enthusiast, avant-garde-ish, amateurish way to watch Un chien andalou (twice), I thought: "Yeah, I will make a song about it." [He sings:] "Un chien andalou"... It sounds too French, so I will sing "un chien andalusia", it sounds good, no?

The title "Debaser" references the fact that Un Chien Andalou "debases" contemporary morality and standards of art: "I guess it means: one who debases. A debaser. It was an attempt to introduce a new word into the lexicon, but I don’t think it’s been successful, else I would have heard about it."

In the earliest version of the song, the line "un chien andalusia" was originally "Shed, Apollonia!", a reference to a scene from Purple Rain.

== Track listing ==
Debaser – Demo

1. "Debaser" (Demo) – 2:59
2. "No. 13 Baby" (Demo) – 3:10

Debaser – Live

1. "Debaser" (Live in Chicago, August 10, 1989) – 2:44
2. "Holiday Song" (Live in Chicago, August 10, 1989) – 2:10
3. "Cactus" (Live in Chicago, August 10, 1989) – 2:27
4. "Nimrod's Son" (Live in Chicago, August 10, 1989) – 3:08

Debaser – Studio

1. "Debaser" – 2:52
2. "Bone Machine" (Live in Netherlands, 1990) – 3:03
3. "Gigantic" (Live in Netherlands, 1990) – 3:24
4. "Isla de Encanta" (Live in Netherlands, 1990) – 1:44

== Personnel ==
Credits adapted from the liner notes of Doolittle.

- Black Francis – vocals, rhythm guitar
- Kim Deal – bass guitar, backing vocals
- Joey Santiago – lead guitar, backing vocals
- David Lovering – drums

== Charts ==
Chart (1997)	Peak position
UK Singles (Official Charts)	23

== Certifications ==
Region	Certification	Certified units/sales
United Kingdom (BPI)	Silver	200,000^{‡}
^{‡} Sales+streaming figures based on certification alone.
