= The Beekeeper =

The Beekeeper may refer to:

- Beekeeper, a person who raises honey bees
- The Beekeeper (1986 film), a Greek drama art film
- The Beekeeper (2024 film), an American action film
- The Beekeeper (album), an album by Tori Amos
- The Beekeepers, a British rock band

== See also ==
- Beekeeping
- The Beekeeper's Apprentice, a novel by Laurie R. King
