= Wave of Mutilation =

Song by Pixies

from the album Doolittle
- Released: April 17, 1989
- Recorded: October 31–November 23, 1988 at Downtown Recorders in Boston, Massachusetts, United States
- Genre: Alternative rock; indie rock
- Length: 2:04
- Label: 4AD (UK); Elektra Records (US)
- Songwriter: Black Francis
- Producer: Gil Norton

"Wave of Mutilation" is an alternative rock song by the American band Pixies, and is the third track on their 1989 album Doolittle. Written and sung by the band's frontman Black Francis, the song was inspired by articles about Japanese businessmen committing murder-suicides by driving into the ocean. The song also references a lyric from the Charles Manson-penned "Cease to Exist", released by the Beach Boys as "Never Learn Not to Love".

In addition to appearing on Doolittle, an alternate version of the song featuring a different arrangement, known as the "UK Surf" version, was released as a B-side to "Here Comes Your Man". The song has since seen critical acclaim and is well regarded by fans. Both the original and "UK Surf" arrangements have appeared in the band's live setlist.

== Background and lyrics ==
Written by Pixies frontman Black Francis, "Wave of Mutilation" was inspired by news coverage of murder-suicides occurring in Japan. He explained:

Who's driving his car into the ocean? No one's going to be able to figure that out, but I was reading about Japanese businessmen doing murder-suicides with their families because they'd failed in business, and they were driving off the pier into the ocean. That's what was going on in 1989, you know, in the paper or whatever. Suicides are up in Japan.

As to the song's title, Francis commented, "Why is it called 'Wave of Mutilation'? Well, I don't know, because a wave is powerful. It's not this soft, beautiful thing, but, like, this crushing thing that turns mountains into sand." The song's "cease to resist" lyric was inspired by a line from the Beach Boys' "Never Learn Not to Love", a song that was written by Charles Manson as "Cease to Exist" but lyrically modified by members of the Beach Boys, who received songwriting credits. Francis joked, "[T]hey couldn't have 'Cease to Exist' because it was all powerful suicide stuff!"

== "UK Surf" version ==
Starting in 1989, Pixies began performing a second, alternate version of "Wave of Mutilation" for encores. This version features a slower, acoustic arrangement that, according to Pitchfork, "shows the band's surf-rock tendencies." A studio version based on this arrangement, labeled the "UK Surf" version, was released as a B-side to "Here Comes Your Man". It was featured in the soundtracks of the movies Pump Up The Volume (1990) and Southland Tales (2006) and has since appeared on Complete B-Sides, as well as the expanded reissue of Doolittle. A live BBC recording of the version of the UK Surf arrangement appears on Pixies at the BBC.

== Release ==
"Wave of Mutilation" was released as the third track on Doolittle in 1989. In addition to the release of the UK Surf version on the "Here Comes Your Man" single, the album recording has appeared on several compilation albums, including Death to the Pixies and Wave of Mutilation: Best of Pixies.

== Critical reception ==
PopMatters described "Wave of Mutilation" as a "jaunty oceanic surge", while AllMusic wrote, "Pixies found the perfect match in the ability of Gil Norton's rock-solid sound production to balance the twist and turns of the band's typically brief tunes, such as 'Wave of Mutilation.'" Salon named it one of the "sleek, tuneful ditties without a pinch of fat" on Doolittle.

NME readers voted "Wave of Mutilation" seventh in its poll of best Pixies songs, Rolling Stone readers ranked the song as the band's fourth best. Diffuser.fm also listed it as the fourth best Pixies song, writing, "If you're going to drive your car into a watery plunge, the Pixies song 'Wave of Mutilation' is the appropriate soundtrack." Guitar ranked the song as the band's 11th best guitar moment, highlighting guitarist Joey Santiago's "brief flurry of crying bends introduced in the final 30 seconds."

Pixies drummer David Lovering stated of the song, "It's an easy song to play, but it's very effective in the way it grabs people. It's got a very odd, arresting spirit. There's nothing else that sounds quite like it."

== Certifications ==
Certifications for "Wave of Mutilation"
Region	Certification	Certified units/sales
Canada (Music Canada)	Gold	40,000^{‡}
^{‡} Sales+streaming figures based on certification alone.
