= Wild Honey Pie =

1968 song by the Beatles

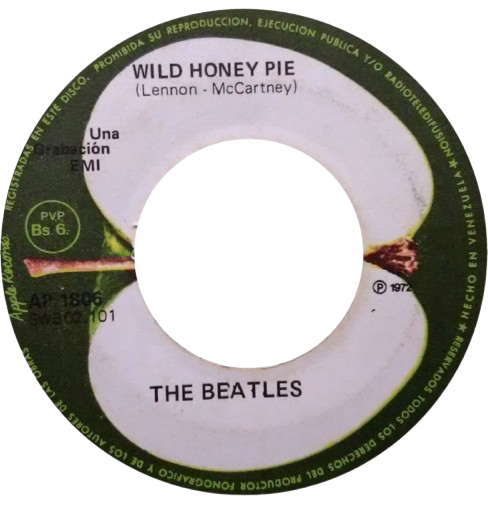
- Label from the 1972 Venezuela single, with "Ob-La-Di, Ob-La-Da" as the A-side

Song by the Beatles

from the album The Beatles
- Released: 22 November 1968 (UK)
- Recorded: 20 August 1968
- Studio: EMI, London
- Genre: Experimental pop; psychedelic folk
- Length: 0:53
- Label: Apple
- Songwriters: Paul McCartney, credited to Lennon–McCartney
- Producer: George Martin

Official audio
- "Wild Honey Pie" on YouTube

"Wild Honey Pie" is a song by the English rock band the Beatles from their 1968 album The Beatles (the White Album). Paul McCartney conceived the song in February 1968 while the band was in Rishikesh, India, and recorded it six months later without his bandmates. He later recalled that they were "in an experimental mode" at the time. Less than a minute long, the song consists of the words "honey pie" shrieked repeatedly over a harpsichord, bass drum, and contorted acoustic guitar notes. It is unrelated to "Honey Pie" despite the similar title. In McCartney's telling, the fate of "Wild Honey Pie" was undecided at first, but Pattie Boyd, George Harrison's wife, liked it, and so it was included on the White Album.

The musicologist Alan W. Pollack thought that "[there's] not much of either here" when discussing the song's harmony and melody. As for its style, genres ranging from psychedelic folk to blues to "miscellaneous" have been attributed to it.

Music critics generally consider "Wild Honey Pie" an odd, strident, and frivolous song, (Note: Odd: Gerard 2016 and Whitley 2000, p. 116, both label the song as "bizarre"; strident: Hertsgaard 1996, p. 257, writes that the song "simply assaulted the ear; it sounded like someone had taken a hammer to a giant pocket watch until the springs inside collapsed in heavy, discordant agony," and Henderson 2004 similarly likens its sound to that of "a pocket-watch suffering a heart attack"; frivolous: MacDonald 2005, p. 309, calls "Wild Honey Pie" a "throwaway," Mulopo 2023 names it as an example of McCartney being "too goofy for his own good," and Unterberger 2003 ranks it at number 1 in his list of "Top Ten Filler Tracks.") and some such as Mark Beaumont have ranked it as one of the Beatles' worst. Within the context of the White Album, however, the song has drawn some support for suiting its unusual aesthetic. The American alternative rock band Pixies often performed "Wild Honey Pie" in their early shows; a live cover was included on their album Pixies at the BBC.

== Background and recording ==
In February 1968, the Beatles travelled to Rishikesh, India, to stay at the Maharashi Mahesh Yogi's meditation centre. Paul McCartney improvised "Wild Honey Pie" there during a spontaneous group singalong. (Note: While McCartney wrote "Wild Honey Pie", it is credited to Lennon–McCartney.) The band's time in India, spanning a few weeks, saw the birth of much of the tracks that would comprise the White Album. It was to be a double album, a work that the critic Allan Kozinn describes as a "fascinating compendium of compositional and performance styles that shows how wide-ranging the Beatles' musical imaginations were". While working on the album, however, the Beatles began growing further apart and collaborating less and less. George Harrison remarks, "There was a lot more individual stuff and, for the first time, people were accepting that it was individual. ... There was a lot of ego in the band, and there were a lot of songs that maybe should have been elbowed."

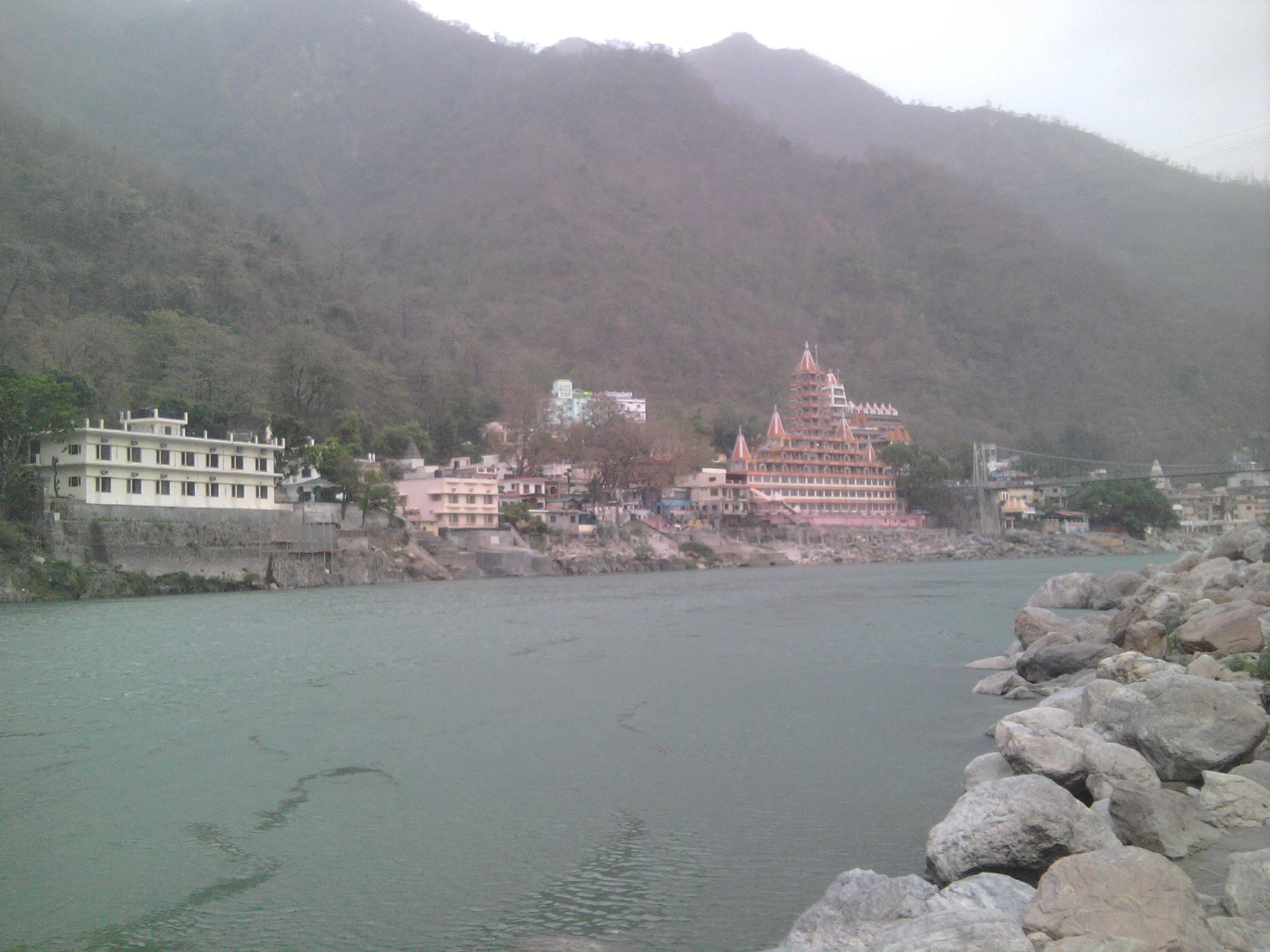
In 1968, the Beatles spent a few weeks in Rishikesh, India, where "Wild Honey Pie" was first conceived.

"Wild Honey Pie" was recorded on 20 August 1968 at EMI Studio Two, with McCartney the sole Beatle present. John Lennon and Ringo Starr were working on other White Album songs, and Harrison was on holiday in Greece. That same day, McCartney had finished recording "Mother Nature's Son". He says on recording "Wild Honey Pie": "We were in an experimental mode, and so I said, 'Can I just make something up?' I started off with the guitar and did a multitracking experiment in the control room or maybe in the little room next door. It was very home-made; it wasn't a big production at all." The musicologist Walter Everett suggests that McCartney recorded it in response to Lennon's "What's the New Mary Jane", another experimental pastiche. The session sheet first indicated "Wild Honey Pie" as Ad-Lib.

In his recording, which took just one take, McCartney shrills the words honey pie while playing acoustic guitar. He additionally recorded a pounding bass drum and doubletracked. The drum layout, set in a corridor, was the same one used for "Mother Nature's Son". During mixing, McCartney's vocal and guitar take was multiplied three times over, one of which was flanged "to give it a heavy wobble", in the author John C. Winn's words. Various overdubs were added to the vocal track. According to the writers Jean-Michel Guesdon and Philippe Margotin, "Paul built [the song] himself by superimposing harmonies over harmonies", overlaying a guitar whose strings were pulled "madly" woven with percussion that included a bass drum "buried in" reverberation. A harpsichord also features. McCartney's recording was later mixed for stereo on 13 October 1968. George Martin produced the song, and Ken Scott and John Smith engineered it. Its name refers to another McCartney work, "Honey Pie", which appears later on the White Album, but it itself is unrelated to "Honey Pie".

According to McCartney, the band vacillated on the song at first, but Harrison's wife Pattie Boyd "liked it very much so we decided to leave it on the album". The music journalist Hunter Davies considers "Wild Honey Pie" "[another] example of Paul being self-indulgent – or self-reflecting. Or perhaps they were struggling to fulfil the contract they had agreed to create 30 or more new songs for the double album". The Beatles historian Ian MacDonald parallels it with the snippets of songs McCartney recorded between takes during the White Album sessions.

== Composition ==
=== Style and structure ===
"Wild Honey Pie" is an experimental work, one that, writes the music critic Kevin Courrier, "deliberately [mocks] the smooth and harmonious pop stylings of the Beatles". Music writers and scholars have assigned numerous genres to the song. Walter Everett describes it as a "whimsical Indian blues singalong", Mark Athitakis considers it psychedelic folk, and Courrier deems it "twisted baroque doo-wop" and experimental pop, while Ian Inglis, in his classification of the White Album tracks by musical influence, groups it under "miscellaneous". Courrier also calls "Wild Honey Pie" simply a "deliberate piece of gibberish". Its abstract, experimental nature, he notes, resembles that of some McCartney's compositions on his debut solo album, McCartney.

Regarding structure, Pollack views the song as a "complete miniature", a consolidated whole, rather an "offhanded fragment", with the same applying to "Why Don't We Do It in the Road?". As part of the White Album, he adds, it serves as an entr'acte to divert the listener's attention during the transition from "Ob-La-Di, Ob-La-Da" to "The Continuing Story of Bungalow Bill". McCartney's track is the shortest one on the album, at 53 seconds. Moreover, in the writer Steve Turner's view, its lyric is the "shortest and most repetitive of any Beatles lyric".

=== Music ===
"Wild Honey Pie" is in the key of G major and is in common time. It comprises an opening break and refrain, both repeated three times, followed by an outro. Although he says of the song's melody and harmony, "There's not much of either here ...", Pollack evaluates them thus,

The harmonic vocabulary essentially is no more than a semi-chromatic chord stream of dominant seventh chords, with just enough root movement included to establish a very bluesy kind of G Major as the home key. The blues are conjured here by the appearance of I with its dominant seventh, and the implied Major/minor cross-relation on I that is most pronounced at the very end of the song.

Made of seven bars, the break exclusively contains dominant seventh chords, starting with a I chord and ending with a V chord. The refrain then resolves the V chord by returning to a I chord. The outro is an appendage of the refrain and employs a variation of the V chord for the final cadence. Throughout the final measures, the bassline shifts back and forth from G to F. "Wild Honey Pie" ends with a I–♭VII–I alteration, which the musicologist Dominic Pedler notes features in "Help!" and in many of the band's "mantra-like, modal excursions" on Revolver and Sgt. Pepper's Lonely Hearts Club Band.

Everett observes tonal similarities between McCartney's piece and other tracks on the White Album, namely, "While My Guitar Gently Weeps", with both having a I–♭VII–♭VI–V structure, and "Glass Onion", sharing the tritones within major-minor chords in the guitar voicings in the latter's coda. According to Courrier, the harpsichord melody quotes The Addams Family's theme tune.

== Release and critical reception ==
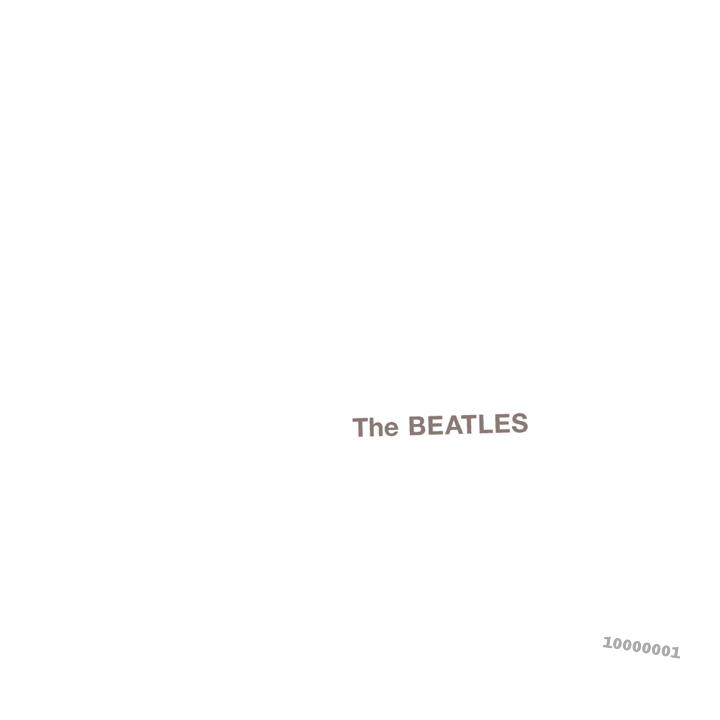
"Wild Honey Pie" was first released on The Beatles LP, better known as the White Album.

"Wild Honey Pie" was sequenced between "Ob-La-Di, Ob-La-Da" and "The Continuing Story of Bungalow Bill", on side one of the White Album. Apple Records released it as part of the White Album on 22 November 1968 in the UK and on 25 November in the US. A mono mix later surfaced, in 1990, on the CD Unsurpassed Masters, Volume 4. Three years later, it was issued on The Peter Sellers Tape, combined with a foot-tap count in and some additional comments.

In the second edition of his Revolution in the Head, MacDonald writes one sentence on "Wild Honey Pie", simply identifying it as a "throwaway based on a Rishikesh singalong ..." Jann Wenner of Rolling Stone, in his contemporary White Album review, also devotes one sole line to the song: "'Wild Honey Pie' makes a nice tribute to psychedelic music and allied forms". The scholar Ed Whitley describes it as "one of the most bizarre tracks the Beatles ever recorded".

Some critics comment on the role of "Wild Honey Pie" in the White Album. Referring to Lennon's distate for "Ob-La-Di, Ob-La-Da", the journalist Mark Hertsgaard states, "But at least 'Ob-La-Di, Ob-La-Da' had a real melody. 'Wild Honey Pie,' which followed it, simply assaulted the ear; it sounded like someone had taken a hammer to a giant pocket watch until the springs inside collapsed in heavy, discordant agony". He adds that it was "perhaps the most extreme case of self-indulgence on the album". On a different note, the music critic Tim Riley believes that "Wild Honey Pie" "flaunts the band's wealth of material" on The Beatles.

While judging McCartney's piece to be "bizarre", Chris Gerard argues that it "somehow works in the context of the album's vast strangeness". Pollack likewise links it to the album's stylistic variety. Ewan Gleadow of Cult Following concedes that the track is "short and sloppy" but, at the same time, thinks it acts as a "necessary break" before "The Continuing Story of Bungalow Bill" and the passional duo of "While My Guitar Gently Weeps" and "Happiness Is a Warm Gun". Reflecting on the White Album's perceived raggedness, the critic Keith Mulopo notes "cuts such as 'Wild Honey Pie' (and 'Honey Pie') [and] 'Why Don't We Do It in the Road' that show McCartney's tendency to be too goofy for his own good". Whitley considers "Wild Honey Pie" within the perspective of the album as a postmodern work: a fragmented, disjointed work incapable of being explained or interpreted as a whole. He writes, "Not only does the White Album have an overall sense of fragmentation, but there are also individual songs like 'Happiness Is a Warm Gun' which are internally fragmented and songs like 'Wild Honey Pie' that are nothing but song fragments".

In Riley's view, if the White Album were trimmed to a single album instead of a double album, "Wild Honey Pie" would "certainly" be excluded. (Note: This, in fact, is the view of many Beatles fans, according to Chris Gerard.) The music critic David Quantick also states that it is often omitted from listeners' single-album versions of The Beatles. By contrast, a Stylus Magazine piece in which the author creates their own version of the track listing includes the song as the album's opening track instead of "Back in the U.S.S.R.": "It's meant here to let the listener know that this is going to be like no Beatles album they've ever heard".

… an interlude that approximates the sound of a pocket-watch suffering a heart attack.

— Eric Henderson of Slant Magazine on "Wild Honey Pie"

"Wild Honey Pie" commonly appears near or at the bottom of Beatles songs rankings. Jacob Stolworthy of The Independent regards it as the worst of the White Album's 30 tracks, and the music journalist Michael Gallucci, in his 2014 list of the worst Beatles songs, places it at number 3. In 2023, Gallucci, Bill Wyman of Vulture, and fellow music writer Mark Beaumont ranked every Beatles song to coincide with the release of "Now and Then": (Note: All three use different criteria to decide what qualifies as a Beatles song.) Gallucci lists "Wild Honey Pie" at number 214 out of 229, rendering it "[fifty]-two seconds of McCartney nonsense", Wyman places it in the bottom quartile, deeming it incoherent, and Beaumont ranks it at the very bottom. Twenty years earlier, the critic Andrew Unterberger ranked McCartney's composition at number 1 on his list of the "Top Ten Filler Tracks". He finds the song "[one] of the most famous half-songs in history" and deems it the best example of groups resorting to "filler to pad their albums, using half-baked ideas and songs that well, must've sounded good at the time instead of just lesser recreations of the good songs on the album". However, "Wild Honey Pie" does make an NME list of the 100 greatest Beatles songs as chosen by popular musicians and critics, with the American alternative rock band Pixies nominating it.

== Live performances and covers ==
The Pixies frequently performed "Wild Honey Pie" in their early shows. A reimagined version was released on their 1998 live album Pixies at the BBC, which the music writer Emily Barker praises for "taking something that barely qualifies as a song and turning it into something ferocious".

== Personnel ==
Per Walter Everett:

- Paul McCartney – vocals, acoustic guitars, bass drum, tom drum, harpsichord
- George Martin – producer, executive producer, arrangement

== Bibliography ==
=== Books and academic sources ===
- Courrier, Kevin (2009). Artificial Paradise: The Dark Side of the Beatles' Utopian Dream. Westport, Connecticut: Praeger Publishers. ISBN 978-0-313-34586-9.
- Davies, Hunter (2016). The Beatles Book. London, England: Ebury Publishing. ISBN 978-0-09-195863-3.
- Doggett, Peter (2009). The Art and Music of John Lennon. London, England: Omnibus Press. ISBN 978-0-85712-126-4.
- Everett, Walter (1999). The Beatles As Musicians: Revolver Through the Anthology. New York City, New York: Oxford University Press. ISBN 0-19-512941-5.
- Guesdon, Jean-Michel; Margotin, Philippe (2013). All the Songs: The Story Behind Every Beatles Release. New York City, New York: Black Dog & Leventhal Publishers. ISBN 978-1-57912-952-1.
- Harry, Bill (1992). The Ultimate Beatles Encyclopedia. Great Britain: Virgin Books. ISBN 0-86369-681-3.
- Hertsgaard, Mark (1996). A Day in the Life: The Music and Artistry of the Beatles. London, England: Pan Books. ISBN 0-330-33891-9.
- Inglis, Ian (2009). "Revolution". In Womack, Kenneth (ed.). The Cambridge Companion to the Beatles. Cambridge, England: Cambridge University Press. pp. 112–124. ISBN 978-0-521-68976-2.
- Lewisohn, Mark (1988). The Beatles Recording Sessions. New York City, New York: Harmony Books. ISBN 0-517-57066-1.
- MacDonald, Ian (1997). Revolution in the Head: The Beatles' Records and the Sixties (1st revised ed.). London, England: Pimlico (Rand). ISBN 978-0-7126-6697-8.
- MacDonald, Ian (2005). Revolution in the Head: The Beatles' Records and the Sixties (2nd revised ed.). London, England: Pimlico (Rand). ISBN 1-844-13828-3.
- Miles, Barry (1998). Paul McCartney: Many Years From Now. London, England: Random House: Vintage. ISBN 0-7493-8658-4.
- Pedler, Dominic (2003). The Songwriting Secrets of the Beatles. London, England: Omnibus Press. ISBN 978-0-7119-8167-6.
- Pollack, Alan W. (1997). "Notes on 'Wild Honey Pie'". Soundscapes. Archived from the original on 17 September 2025.
- Quantick, David (2002). Revolution: The Making of the Beatles' White Album. Chicago, Illinois: A Cappella Books. ISBN 1-55652-470-6.
- Riley, Tim (2002). Tell Me Why – The Beatles: Album by Album, Song by Song, the Sixties and After. Cambridge, Massachusetts: Da Capo Press. ISBN 978-0-306-81120-3.
- Schaffner, Nicholas (1978). The Beatles Forever. New York City, New York: McGraw-Hill. ISBN 0-07-055087-5.
- Turner, Steve (2005). A Hard Day's Write: The Stories Behind Every Beatles Song. New York City, New York: Harper Paperbacks. ISBN 0-06-084409-4.
- Whitley, Ed (2000). "The Postmodern White Album". In Inglis, Ian (ed.). The Beatles, Popular Music and Society: A Thousand Voices. Houndmills, England: Palgrave (Macmillan). pp. 105–125.
- Winn, John C. (2009). That Magic Feeling: The Beatles' Recorded Legacy, Volume Two, 1966–1970. New York City, New York: Three Rivers Press. ISBN 978-0-307-45239-9.

=== News articles and websites ===
- Athitakis, Mark (September–October 2013). "A Beatles Reflection". National Endowment of the Humanities. Archived from the original on 10 April 2025.
- Barker, Emily (23 December 2015). "100 Greatest Beatles Songs As Chosen By Music's A-Listers: 100 – 51". NME. Archived from the original on 18 December 2024.
- Beaumont, Mark (2 November 2023). "The Beatles: every song ranked in order of greatness". NME. Archived from the original on 5 October 2025.
- Burns, Todd (8 June 2004). "The Beatles: The White Album". Stylus Magazine. Archived from the original on 20 April 2017.
- Gallucci, Michael (8 February 2014). "10 Worst Beatles Songs". Ultimate Classic Rock. Archived from the original on 5 September 2025.
- Gallucci, Michael (2 November 2023). "All 229 Beatles Songs Ranked Worst to Best". Ultimate Classic Rock. Archived from the original on 25 September 2025.
- Gerard, Chris (19 February 2016). "The Glorious, Quixotic Mess That Is the Beatles' 'White Album'". PopMatters. Archived from the original on 8 September 2025.
- Gleadow, Ewan (22 May 2025). "The Beatles – White Album Review". Cult Following. Archived from the original on 4 December 2025.
- Gleadow, Ewan (22 May 2025). "The Beatles – White Album Review". Cult Following. Archived from the original on 4 December 2025.
- Henderson, Eric (2 August 2004). "Review: The Beatles, The Beatles (The White Album)". Slant Magazine. Archived from the original on 3 September 2025.
- Mulopo, Keith (22 November 2023). "Album Review: The Beatles (White Album)// The Beatles". The Indiependent. Archived from the original on 1 August 2025.
- Stolworthy, Jacob (22 November 2018). "The Beatles' White Album tracks, ranked – from Blackbird to While My Guitar Gently Weeps". The Independent. Archived from the original on 21 August 2025.
- Unterberger, Andrew (6 June 2003). "Top Ten Filler Tracks". Stylus Magazine. Archived from the original on 30 July 2016.
- Wenner, Jann S. (21 December 1968). "Review: The Beatles' 'White Album'". Rolling Stone. p. 2. Archived from the original on 4 December 2025.
- Wyman, Bill (3 November 2023). "All 214 Beatles Songs, Ranked From Worst to Best". Vulture. Archived from the original on 14 September 2025.
