= Velouria =

1990 single by Pixies

Single by Pixies

from the album Bossanova
- A-side: "Velouria"
- B-side: "Make Believe"; "I've Been Waiting for You"; "The Thing"
- Released: July 16, 1990
- Recorded: 1989–1990
- Studio: Cherokee Studios, Los Angeles, California; Hansa Ton, Berlin, Germany
- Genre: Alternative rock
- Length: 3:42
- Label: 4AD/Elektra
- Songwriter: Black Francis
- Producer: Gil Norton

Pixies singles chronology
"Here Comes Your Man" (1989)	"Velouria" (1990)	"Dig for Fire" (1990)

"Velouria" is a song by the American alternative rock band Pixies from their third studio album Bossanova (1990). Written and sung by the band's frontman Black Francis, the song was written as a love song rooted in Francis's experience with a girl associated with the Rosicrucians of Northern California. The lyrics also touched on Francis's interest in UFOs. Musically, the song features surf rock elements as well as a theremin part.

"Velouria" was released as the lead single from Bossanova on July 16, 1990, and became the band's first Top 40 hit in the United Kingdom. The release was accompanied by a music video, featuring a short clip of the band in a quarry slowed down to fit the song's length. "Velouria" has since seen critical acclaim and has appeared on several compilations.

== Background and lyrics ==
Black Francis said of the lyrics to the song in an interview with SongFacts, "It's folklore based; the Rosicrucians of 1920s San Jose California had some pretty interesting ideas." The lyrics allude to the mythical lost continent of Lemuria and the Rosicrucians' belief that its survivors lived beneath Mount Shasta. Francis explained:

There are these people in California around San Jose, they call themselves Rosicrucians but they're not like the Rosicrucians of yesteryear. ... There's this lost continent of Lemuria, as in the lemurs from Madagascar sank in the pacific and all of the inhabitants took off and entered into that hollowed out mountain called Mount Shasta. ... And I had an experience there a few years ago with a girl that I met in those parts, who was one of these Lemurians. ... [It was named] "Velouria" because velour, she was kind of covered in fur. She was smooth and beautiful but it was like she was furry!

Producer Gil Norton claimed the song was also inspired by Francis's fascination with UFOs and extraterrestrials: "He was trying to write about space, a superhero-type person, and he had this material, velour, that he really liked the touch of, and that's where he got the 'Velouria' from, what she would wear."

== Music ==
The song has been labeled as punk rock and surf rock by critics. The song features extensive use of theremin, which the band brought in to excite Francis. Norton recalled, "We got a theremin player [Robert F. Brunner]. I found him in a musician's union book under 'theremin.' There were, like three of them in there."

== Release ==
"Velouria" was released as the lead single from Pixies' third album, Bossanova (1990), on July 16, 1990. Of the song's B-sides, "I've Been Waiting for You" is a Neil Young cover sung by Kim Deal, while "Make Believe" is a David Lovering-sung track written about Lovering's admitted "obsession" with US singer-songwriter Debbie Gibson. The single was a moderate alternative success, reaching number four on the American alternative charts as well as number 28 in the UK, making it the band's first top 40 UK single.

In addition to appearing on Bossanova, the song appears on the influential 1990 Madchester compilation album Happy Daze, as well as Pixies compilations Death to the Pixies and Wave of Mutilation: Best of Pixies.

== Video ==
As "Velouria" was climbing up the UK Top 40, the band was offered a spot on Top of the Pops. However, a BBC rule stated that only singles with videos could be performed on the show. To counter this, a cheap video was made with the band being filmed running down a quarry. Director Peter "Pinko" Fowler, according to Francis, "wanted to shoot us running toward him in [a] quarry" outside Manchester. Guitarist Joey Santiago recalled:

[The director] held a camera, and we just ran towards it, and we thought we had enough footage. I think we were all probably high. And then we looked at it, and he goes, 'Is that all we have?' It's like, 'Man, well, we'll just slow it down then, until the song ends.' So that's what we did. We were making fun of the video too. We never really liked doing them, just because when you think of a song, you want your imagination to have its own thing going, you know?

In the video, 23 seconds of footage (the time needed for the band members to reach the camera) is slowed in order to last for the duration of the song. However, the effort in filming the video was in vain; Pixies did not play "Velouria" on Top of the Pops while the single was in the charts.

An alternate version of the video, also filmed in the quarry, was unearthed during the compiling of the 30th edition of Bossanova.

== Critical reception ==
"Velouria" has received critical acclaim since its release. Entertainment Weekly wrote in a 1990 review that the song is "intense" and "has both strangely shivering guitars and a melodic refrain that cascades over the surface of the music like waves crashing on a devastated beach." The NME wrote during that same year, "By now most of us have heard 'Velouria'. Not as immediate as 'Gigantic' or 'Monkey Gone to Heaven' as far as singles go, but still a delightfully wiggy window to the world of Black Francis and the maddest thing to have been seen on Top of the Pops since the Wombles were Top Ten regulars."

Retrospective writers have been similarly effusive in their praise. Blender called it "their greatest love song after 'Gigantic'", while AllMusic wrote, "On the theremin-driven 'Velouria,' science fiction imagery displaces Francis' penchant for fetishistic lyrics; next to the token kinky song 'Down to the Well″s tired sound, it's a refreshing change." Guitar.com ranked the song the band's 12th greatest guitar moment, writing, "[Francis] nailed this peculiar love song." Rolling Stone readers voted the song the band's tenth best.

== In media ==
"Velouria" is played in the AMC show Halt and Catch Fire during season 3, episode 9, 'NIM'.

== Track listing ==
All tracks are written by Black Francis, except where noted.

No.	Title	Writer(s)	Length
1.	"Velouria"		3:40
2.	"Make Believe"		1:54
3.	"I've Been Waiting for You"	Neil Young	2:45
4.	"The Thing"		1:58

== Covers ==
- 1999 – The song was covered by Weezer in the tribute album Where Is My Mind? A Tribute to the Pixies. This version was praised by Black Francis as his favorite cover of a Pixies song.
- 2004 – Black Francis re-recorded a version of "Velouria" with Keith Moliné and Andy Diagram for his album Frank Black Francis.
- 2004 – The Bad Plus covered the song in their album Give.
- 2008 – A cover of the song appeared on Rockabye Baby! Lullaby Renditions of the Pixies, part of the Rockabye Baby! series of albums.

== Charts ==
Chart (1990)	Peak position
Ireland (IRMA)	17
UK Singles (OCC)	28
US Alternative Airplay (Billboard)	4
