= Narc (video game) =

1988 video game

- Arcade flyer
- Developer: Williams Electronics (Note: Ported to the NES by Rare)
- Publisher: Williams Electronics (Note: NES version published by Acclaim Entertainment)
- Director: Nathaniel Davies
- Designer: Eugene Jarvis
- Programmers: George N. Petro; Todd Allen; Eugene Jarvis
- Composer: Brian L. Schmidt; Marc LoCascio ("NARC Rap"): NES David Wise Amiga, Atari ST Tony Williams
- Platforms: Arcade, NES, ZX Spectrum, Amiga, Atari ST, Amstrad CPC, Commodore 64
- Release: December 1988: Arcade; NA: December 1988 NES; NA: August 1990 ZX Spectrum; UK: November 1990 Amiga, Atari ST, C64; NA/EU: 1990 CPC; EU: 1990
- Genre: Run and gun
- Modes: Single-player, multiplayer
- Arcade system: Williams Z-Unit

Narc (stylized in all capitals as NARC) is a 1988 run and gun video game developed and published by Williams Electronics for arcades. The game was designed by Eugene Jarvis and programmed by George Petro, Todd Allen, and Jarvis, with art by Jack Haeger, John Newcomer, and Lin Young. It was one of the first ultra-violent video games and a frequent target of parental criticism of the video game industry. The object is to arrest and kill drug offenders, confiscate their money and drugs, and defeat "Mr. Big". It was the first game in the newly restarted Williams Electronics coin-op video game division. Shortly before its release, Williams acquired the video and pinball divisions of Bally/Midway.

Narc was ported to the Commodore 64, Atari ST, Amiga, ZX Spectrum, Amstrad CPC, and NES. In 2005, the franchise was re-launched with a new game for the Xbox and PlayStation 2; a GameCube version of said game was planned, but was ultimately scrapped.

== Gameplay ==
Arcade screenshot

The game's main characters are Max Force and Hit Man, who have received a memo from Spencer Williams, Narcotics Opposition chairman in Washington, D.C., dispatching them on Project NARC. Their mission is to apprehend Mr. Big, head of an underground drug trafficking and terrorist organization known simply as K.R.A.K..

The player controls either Max Force or Hit Man, who shoot or arrest junkies, drug dealers, and organized crime kingpins. Max and Hit are each equipped with an automatic weapon and a missile launcher. When an enemy is dispatched using the latter, they explode in a torrent of scorched and bloody appendages. Some enemies can be arrested after they surrender and then float away with "busted" over them. This is then added to a tally at the end of the level along with drugs and money confiscated from other enemies that they dropped when gunned down (the game awards more points at the end of a round for arresting enemies without killing them).

The game includes a buy-in feature which could be used multiple times, but not in the final stage.

== Development ==
The arcade game uses what is termed a "medium resolution monitor": higher resolution than televisions and normal arcade monitors, but in a smaller physical size. This uses a 512x400 resolution.

Narc is the first arcade game to use the Texas Instruments TMS34010, a 32-bit processor with graphics-oriented instructions built-in. The chip was too slow to run the game envisaged by Eugene Jarvis, and a custom blitter chip was developed by Williams hardware engineer Mark Loffredo. The system created with these chips could use 256 palettes of 256 colours for photorealistic 2D rendering. Some of the digitized graphics were created using an AT&T image capture board, using custom software developed at Williams. Each enemy in the game was portrayed by an actor in baggy costume, using concise loopable movements. Walking and running motions were recorded on a treadmill.

The game is named after narcotics officers. The concept came from Jarvis' experiences of personally knowing "some people who have had problems with drugs".

== Release ==
Narc was unveiled at the 1988 AMOA Expo, including a distributor meeting with actors dressed as the two main characters. The trade recognized it as a "breakthrough game".

Earlier games were issued with "$100 bonus buck" which could be used to obtain a discount on other Williams machines.

== Ports ==
The 1990 Nintendo Entertainment System (NES) version of Narc, published by Acclaim Entertainment and developed by Rare, was billed as "the first video game with a strong anti-drug message." Nintendo saw the anti-drug message positively, and the only change enforced from the arcade version was to remove blood; enemies were renamed from KRAK to KWAK. Some music tracks were also removed for this version.

Most of the computer ports had their music ported by Tony Williams (credited as "Sound Images"), and David Wise ported the arcade music to the NES. The Game Boy version of Terminator 2 uses some music from Narc. The ZX Spectrum version uses monochrome graphics. Controls for the computer ports were limited to one joystick button.

== Reception ==
Reception (coin-op)

Review scores
Publication	Score
Sinclair User	8/10
Generation 4	5/10

Over 3,700 units of the arcade machine were sold.

After appearing at an event shown on the Canadian Broadcasting Corp. national news the Toronto Star and Toronto Sun covered the games anti-drug message.

Most versions of the game generally received positive reviews, being praised for its intense action and enjoyable gameplay, but criticism for its repetitiveness. Reviewing the arcade version, Sinclair User praised the graphics and the anti-drugs theme.

Reception (ZX Spectrum)

Review scores
Publication	Score
Crash	94/95%
Your Sinclair	72%

Reviewing the ZX Spectrum version, Crash praised the graphics and wide array of criminal enemies. The two player team option was called a "great success". One reviewer rated the game at 94%, and another rated it at 95%, with both calling it the best coin-op conversion of 1990, and one calling it the best game. Matt Bielby of Your Sinclair called it "one of the most objectionable Speccy games I've seen in ages", and called it "repetitive" and the plot "utter nonsense."

In 2019 Kurt Kalata praised the arcade version, noting "very little effort put into the game’s difficulty balance" due to its intentional design to munch quarters. The NES version was also praised, but controls of most computer versions was found to be frustrating. The Commodore 64 version was found to be the second-best port behind the NES version, and the Amstrad CPC version the worst with serious flaws making it "nearly worthless".

Due to being one of the first games to feature blood, it has been a target of concerns and criticism from parents.

== Legacy ==
In 1990, Acclaim released Narc as a handheld LCD game.

The game's main theme by Brian L. Schmidt was recorded by American alternative rock band Pixies and released as a B-side on their "Planet of Sound" single in 1990.

Upgraded versions of the same digitization technology used to create Narc was later used in Mortal Kombat and NBA Jam.

Narc is included in the 2004 compilation Midway Arcade Treasures 2.

=== 2005 game ===
A reimagined version was announced to be in development in 2004.

On March 21, 2005, a press release announced the game's shipment to retailers and emphasized that it was designed for an "older audience". The game was given an M rating.

This version was developed by VIS Entertainment and published by Midway for the Xbox, PlayStation 2, and Windows. The Windows version, only released in Europe, was developed by Point of View.

The game casts the players as narcotics officer Jack Forzenski (voiced by Michael Madsen) and DEA agent Marcus Hill (voiced by Bill Bellamy), former partners reunited who are instructed to investigate a new drug on the streets called Liquid Soul. After arresting dealers and confiscating their stock, the player can either take the confiscated items to the evidence room, or keep them for future use. This confers benefits such as improved weapons accuracy. Dealing drugs for financial benefit is also possible.

IGN found it to good for "mindless amusement", but for players looking for more than that to try another game.
