= The Beekeepers =

English rock band

- Origin: Derby, England
- Genres: Indie rock
- Years active: 1993–1998, 2011, 2013
- Labels: Beggars Banquet Records
- Past members: Jamie East; Mark Simpson; Steve Tree Bailey; Julian Berry; Kevin Lamb; Gary Thatcher
- Website: The Bee Keepers (archive)

The Beekeepers were an English rock band from Derby, signed to the Beggars Banquet Records label. Their releases included the mini-album Third Party, Fear and Theft and the single, Do You Behave Like That at Home?

== History ==
The Beekeepers, composed of Jamie East (vocals), Gary Thatcher (guitar), Mark Simpson (bass), Steve Bailey (drums), formed in 1993. They signed to Beggars Banquet Records, and released their first single, "Hold On", in 1996. Other releases followed, including "Do You Behave Like That at Home?", a Melody Maker 'Single of the Week', and an album, Third Party, Fear and Theft, which featured production by Gil Norton.

They toured extensively from 1996 until 1998 and were once supported by Travis. They also had TV appearances on MTV, VHF, The O-Zone, The Chart Show and The Mag.

The group broke up in 1998, with some members going on to form Lucas J.

In 2001, East, the band's singer and lyricist said he had had enough of 'pop-fuelled punk' and wanted to explore different genres.

=== 2011–present ===
The Beekeepers recorded new material and reformed for a reunion at The Old Bell in Derby on 24 September 2011. Kev Lamb replaced Julian Berry on guitar duties.

In November 2013, the Beekeepers took to the stage at The Assembly Rooms Derby, guesting with the band on the night was Pendulum guitarist Peredur ap Gwynedd who replaced Gary Thatcher due to prior work commitments.

== Discography ==
=== Albums ===
- Third Party, Fear and Theft: This was released by Beggars Banquet Records on 2 March 1998, catalogue number BBQMCD199.

Track Listing

1. "Eyeballed"
2. "Killer Cure"
3. "Inheritance"
4. "Second Skin"
5. "Do You Behave Like That at Home?"
6. "I Only Want to See You; Suffer"
7. "Beau Peepshow"
8. "Elsewhere"
9. "Catgut"
10. "The Mouse Song" (bonus track)

=== Singles ===
- "Lovelace" / "Red Door": this was a 7" vinyl-only double A-sided single with picture sleeve, released in 1994 through Ruy Records under catalogue number RUY1.

Track Listing:

1. "Lovelace"
2. "Red Door"
- "Catgut": Catgut was a promotional single, limited to about 500 copies and released through Jealous Records, catalogue number COUP 004. The single was a split-release with Gluebellies. "Catgut" is the same version as found on Third Party, Fear and Theft.

Track Listing:

1. The Beekeepers - "Catgut"
2. Gluebellies - "Don't Let me Interrupt"
- "Hold On": This was released by Beggars Banquet Records in both 7" vinyl and CD formats on 21 October 1996, catalogue number BBQ304.

Track Listing:

1. "Hold On"
2. "Blood Red"
3. "Mastermind"
- "Do You Behave Like That at Home?": This was released by Beggars Banquet Records in both 7" vinyl and CD formats on 3 February 1997, catalogue number BBQ 305. The single was the Melody Maker Single Of The Week on its release. The song had a promotional video directed by John Hardwick.

Track Listing

1. "Do You Behave Like That at Home?"
2. "Less We Care"
3. "Window Shopper (Demo Version)"
- "Lunar": Lunar was released by Beggars Banquet Records in both 7" vinyl and CD formats on 12 May 1997, catalogue number BBQ311.

Track Listing

1. "Lunar"
2. "Bitter Taste"
3. "Cellophane"
- "Killer Cure": This was released by Beggars Banquet Records in both 7" vinyl and CD formats on 3 November 1997, catalogue number BBQ320. The accompanying video was directed by Tim Claxton.

Track Listing

1. "Killer Cure"
2. "Faking"
3. "How to Stand Up"
