= The People The Poet =

Welsh alternative rock band

- Origin: Cardiff, Wales, United Kingdom
- Genres: Alternative rock
- Years active: 2012-Present
- Labels: AntiFragile Records
- Members: Leon Stanford; Tyla Campbell; Luc Morris; Lewis Rowsell; Jimmi Kendall
- Website: http://www.thepeoplethepoet.com/

The People The Poet is an alternative rock band from Cardiff, Wales. The band formed in 2012, having previously performed with the same lineup under the name Tiger Please. The People The Poet released their first album The Narrator in 2013, and have since performed at South by Southwest and released an EP (Paradise Closed - 2016).

The band are due to release an album in 2018, from which the first single ("Where The Dandelions Roar") was released in December 2017.

== Discography ==
=== EPs ===
- Paradise Closed (2016)

=== LPs ===
- The Narrator (2013)
- A Short Obsession With Time (2018)
- The Light of Day (B Sides and Demos) (2020)
