= Letter to Memphis =

Single by Pixies

from the album Trompe le Monde
- Released: 1991
- Recorded: 1991
- Studio: Master Control, Burbank; Pacifique, Burbank; Studio des dames, Paris; Blackwing, London
- Genre: Alternative rock; grunge
- Length: 2:39
- Label: Elektra/4AD
- Songwriter: Black Francis
- Producer: Gil Norton

Pixies singles chronology
"Alec Eiffel" (1991)	"Letter to Memphis" (1991)	"Head On" (1991)

"Letter to Memphis" is a single by the alternative rock band Pixies, from their 1991 album Trompe le Monde. The song was frontman Black Francis' take on Chuck Berry's song "Memphis, Tennessee". An instrumental version was included as a B-side to the "Alec Eiffel" single and later became the closing track of their compilation Complete 'B' Sides.

In the December 1991 issue of Spin, critic Ivan Kreilkamp commented on "Letter to Memphis": "out of the kitsch and froth of the Pixies' sensibility, a line like 'trying to get to you' sticks in your mind like a piece of genuine feeling hidden on the back of a tacky postcard."

== Charts ==
Chart (1991)	Peak position
US Alternative Airplay (Billboard)	6
