= Here Comes Your Man =

Single by Pixies

from the album Doolittle
- B-side: "Wave of Mutilation" (UK Surf version); "Into the White"; "Bailey's Walk"
- Released: June 19, 1989
- Recorded: October 31 – November 23, 1988
- Studio: Downtown Recorders, Boston; Carriage House, Stamford
- Genre: Indie rock; pop
- Length: 3:21
- Label: 4AD, Elektra
- Songwriter: Black Francis
- Producer: Gil Norton

Pixies singles chronology
"Monkey Gone to Heaven" (1989)	"Here Comes Your Man" (1989)	"Velouria" (1990)

"Here Comes Your Man" is a song by the American alternative rock band Pixies, written and sung by the band's frontman Black Francis. Produced by Gil Norton, it was released as the second single from the group's second album Doolittle in June 1989.

Written by Black Francis as a teenager, "Here Comes Your Man" was recorded for the band's 1987 demo tape, but not included on either Come On Pilgrim or Surfer Rosa, as the songwriter was reluctant to release the song. Critics saw "Here Comes Your Man" as the Pixies' breakthrough song; Jon Dolan of Spin magazine commented that it was "the most accessible song ever by an underground-type band." The song reached number three on the U.S. Billboard Modern Rock Tracks chart. In 2019, the single was certified Gold in Canada.

== Background and recording ==
Black Francis recalled that he wrote "Here Comes Your Man" around the time he was age 14 or 15. Years later after the Pixies were formed, producer Paul Kolderie noted the group did not want to record "Here Comes Your Man" for its demo "The Purple Tape". The group referred to it as "the Tom Petty song", according to Kolderie. Producer Gary Smith stated that, "There was some reluctance to do 'Here Comes Your Man' because it was too pop, there was something too straight about it." When 4AD label head Ivo Watts-Russell handpicked the track listing for the group's debut release Come on Pilgrim, he intentionally left out "Here Comes Your Man". Watts-Russell stated that he liked the song, but "it felt just too obviously commercial and I didn't know what we were doing with [the band]". Watts-Russell also felt it was too reminiscent of Mink DeVille's "Spanish Stroll". For a post-Surfer Rosa single, 4AD rejected another recording of the song; they later chose "Gigantic", with "River Euphrates" on the B-side.

Francis reflected in 2004 that, during the recording of the group's second album Doolittle, he felt embarrassed by "Here Comes Your Man", but since producer Gil Norton really liked the song, the songwriter "threw him a bone". Norton recorded the band performing the song's backing track when Black Francis was not available. The song featured a different arrangement from previous recordings of the track, and Black Francis added another verse to it.

== Composition ==
"Here Comes Your Man"
This sample contains the end of the first verse and the chorus.

"Here Comes Your Man" opens with the Hendrix chord, favored by Pixies guitarist Joey Santiago and was used on "Tame". The acoustic guitar plays a D–G–A chord progression, while Santiago plays a guitar riff which is the result of him double-tracking a 12-string Rickenbacker and a Telecaster.

In an interview with NME, Francis commented on the meaning of the song:

It's about winos and hobos traveling on the trains, who die in the California Earthquake, peeing their pants. Before earthquakes, everything gets very calm — animals stop talking and birds stop chirping and there's no wind. It's very ominous. I've been through a few earthquakes, actually, 'cause I grew up in California. I was only in one big one, in 1971. I was very young and I slept through it. I've been awake through lots of small ones at school and at home. It's very exciting actually — a very comical thing. It's like the earth is shaking, and what can you do? Nothing.

The word "boxcar" was apparently a starting point for the song's lyrics, and Francis has suggested that this was in part inspired by the song "Carnival of Sorts (Box Car)" by R.E.M.: "I probably liked the word 'boxcar' because I heard it on the R.E.M. song, from their first record."

== Video and imagery ==
A music video to promote the single, co-directed by Neil Pollock and Jonathan Bekemeier, shows the band playing its instruments through a distorted fish-eye lens, the camera variously panning horizontally across the performance space and vertically over the individual band members. Keeping in the spirit of the mimed performance, Francis and bassist Kim Deal open and shut their mouths in time with their prerecorded vocals, yet make no attempt to articulate their lips in sync with the words that they are supposed to be singing. Instead, they simply keep their mouths wide open with blank expressions for the duration of each verse. Francis stated that "Water on the brain" was the theme of the clip.

== Release and reception ==
"Here Comes Your Man" was released as a single in June 1989, and the song's music video received some airplay on MTV. The cover image, chosen by Francis, comes from a photograph that cover designer Simon Larbalestier took of a Bull Terrier for a gallery showing. Pixies rarely played "Here Comes Your Man" at concerts or at promotional events. Music writer Ben Sisario described this stance as "vintage college-rock 'tude—the hit, the pop song, should be avoided as inauthentic, while the aggro, anticommercial song represents legitimacy." Ivo Watts-Russell stated if Black Francis had been possibly persuaded to release the version of the song recorded during the session for the "Gigantic" single—which he described as "totally streamlined and ready for radio"—that "maybe if a major label company was able to convince people to take a more commercial route, maybe Pixies would have sold a whole bunch more records than they did. But those steps were just not required back in 1989". The song reached number three on the U.S. Billboard Modern Rock Tracks chart.

Joey Santiago later recalled: "The tour manager asked, 'Hey, Arsenio Hall wants you to come on the show.' We said, 'Well, what do they want to hear?' He said, 'Here Comes Your Man.' No way. We told them we would love to go on, only if we did the song 'Tame'. And they said, 'No, thank you.'"

== In popular culture ==
The song makes an appearance in the 2009 romantic comedy film (500) Days of Summer, where it is sung by the main character Tom Hansen in a karaoke bar. Other appearances include the films Say It Isn't So (2001), Stuck on You (2003), Deuce Bigalow: European Gigolo (2005), and Daddy's Home (2015). It also appeared in the "Hardly Kirk-ing" episode of The Simpsons (2013), episodes 9 and 10 of Mr. Mercedes (2017), and the series finale of Stranger Things (2025).

The song was featured in a Citi commercial in 2017. The following year, the song made an appearance on the June 11 episode of the BBC magazine show The One Show, playing over a montage of Michael Crawford's career.

== Track listing ==
All songs written by Black Francis.

1. "Here Comes Your Man" – 3:00
2. "Wave of Mutilation (UK Surf)" – 3:00
3. "Into the White" – 4:42
4. "Bailey's Walk" – 2:23

== Personnel ==
Personnel taken from the "Here Comes Your Man" liner notes.

- Black Francis – vocals, guitar
- Joey Santiago – lead guitar
- Kim Deal – bass guitar, vocals
- David Lovering – drums

== Charts ==
Chart (1989)	Peak position
UK Singles (Official Charts)	54
US Alternative Airplay (Billboard)	3

== Certifications ==
Region	Certification	Certified units/sales
Canada (Music Canada)	Platinum	80,000^{‡}
New Zealand (RMNZ)	Platinum	30,000^{‡}
United Kingdom (BPI)	Gold	400,000^{‡}
United States (RIAA)	Platinum	1,000,000^{‡}
^{‡} Sales+streaming figures based on certification alone.
