= Where Is My Mind? =

1988 song by Pixies

Song by Pixies

from the album Surfer Rosa
- Released: March 21, 1988
- Recorded: November 1987
- Studio: Downtown Recorders, South End, Boston
- Genre: Alternative rock; indie rock
- Length: 3:53
- Label: 4AD
- Songwriter: Black Francis
- Producer: Steve Albini

Audio sample
- Sample of end of 3rd verse and part of chorus: file; help

Music video
- "Where Is My Mind?" (Official Lyric Video) on YouTube

"Where Is My Mind?" is a song by American alternative rock band Pixies, originally released as the seventh track on their 1988 debut album, Surfer Rosa.

After receiving initial success upon release, the song saw renewed popularity after being featured in the 1999 film Fight Club. It has become the band's signature song and has inspired a multitude of covers while several arrangements of the song have been used in various film, television, and video game soundtracks. The song was ranked at No. 493 on Rolling Stone magazine's 500 Greatest Songs of All Time 2021 list.

== Background ==
Frontman Black Francis wrote the song about an experience on a high-school trip to the Bahamas in which a small fish aggressively pursued him while he was swimming.

Guitarist Joey Santiago composed the song's guitar line. He recalled of his part, "This was actually the first thing I tried. A lazy arpeggio that instantly sounded strong and hooky."

== Recording and production ==
Producer Steve Albini tracked the song during the Surfer Rosa sessions in late 1987. Albini and the band have described an open, try-it-and-see approach in the studio; Black Francis later called Albini's attitude "cavalier" in a way that matched the band's naivety at the time.

To obtain the song's distinctive ambience on the backing vocals, Albini moved equipment into a tiled bathroom and where he recorded Kim Deal's shouted "ooh-ooh" to capture natural echo, a technique the group also used for the song "Gigantic".

Pixies members have also revisited the session details—including arrangement decisions and Albini's engineering choices—in a 2023 oral-history podcast about the making of Surfer Rosa.

== Cover versions ==
- Texas rock band Toadies cover "Where Is My Mind" at live shows. The song is also on their 2002 release Best of Toadies: Live From Paradise
- Nada Surf covered the song on the 1999 Pixies tribute album Where Is My Mind?: A Tribute to the Pixies.
- Tkay Maidza's 2021 cover version was used in a 2023 Apple AirPods commercial, as well as the final episode of the Donald Glover limited series Swarm. This version is also included in the 2022 racing video game Need for Speed Unbound.
- Preteen Nandi Bushell recorded the song in 2021, earning praise from the Pixies.
- Kelly Clarkson covered the song in 2021 during the "Kellyoke" segment of the third season of The Kelly Clarkson Show.
- Members of the punk bands Touché Amoré, PUP, Vein.fm, and Twitching Tongues joined wrestler Orange Cassidy for a 2021 punk cover.
- Trampled by Turtles covered the song from their 2013 live-album Live at First Avenue.
- German band Heldmaschine covered it as a bonus track on their 2023 album Flächenbrand.
- James Blunt has covered the song in live performances and included it on his 2006 live CD/DVD Chasing Time: The Bedlam Sessions.
- Maxence Cyrin covered it on piano for his 2009 album Novö Piano.
- Placebo covered the song on their 2003 compilation album Covers.
- The M.I.A. song "20 Dollar" makes extensive use of the music and lyrics of "Where Is My Mind?".
- Australian rock band End of Fashion were criticized for the similarities between the guitar riff from "Where Is My Mind?" and the one used in their 2005 song "O Yeah".
- French singer Louane covered the song in 2025 on the Eurovision Song Contest YouTube channel as a part of ESC's "A Little Bit More".

== Legacy ==
"Where Is My Mind?" was voted number 29 in the "Hottest 100 of All Time" music poll conducted by Australian radio station Triple J in 2009. In the United Kingdom, it was certified double platinum by the BPI.

== Inclusion in media and events ==
The song first saw increased popularity after featuring in the 1999 film Fight Club, in which it plays during the final scene. On April 13, 2004, NASA used "Where Is My Mind?" to wake up the team working on the Spirit Mars rover, in honor of its software transplant. Its popularity led to the Pixies' live performance of the song at Coachella in 2004 to be heavily pirated online. In March 2021, the song began being used as the entrance music for professional wrestlers Orange Cassidy and Best Friends after it was licensed by All Elite Wrestling: it was replaced with the Jefferson Starship song "Jane" in 2022 but was restored in 2024. In 2023, the song's opening lyric inadvertently caused certain Android phones to turn off set alarms.

The song featured in the Criminal Minds episode "Sex, Birth, Death", which aired on November 29, 2006, while a xylophone-only cover of the song was used in the episode "The Lesson", which aired on December 5, 2012. A cover version by Allison Scagliotti appears in the Warehouse 13 episode "Don't Hate the Player", which aired on August 15, 2011. An all-kazoo cover of the song was used in The Tick episode "Where's My Mind", which aired on August 25, 2017.

The original version of the song also featured in the films Gaz Bar Blues (2003), Mr. Nobody (2009), Knock Knock (2015), and the teaser trailer for Thunderbolts* (2025). Cover versions of the song have also widely been used in film: those by Yoav and Storm Large feature in Sucker Punch (2011) and Big Ass Spider! (2013), respectively. Safari Riot and Grayson Sanders’ version of the song is used in Malignant (2021). The song's piano cover by Maxence Cyrin has seen the widest use: it has been featured in the television series The Leftovers (alongside the original version) and Mr. Robot, in the film It's Kind of a Funny Story (2010), and in the "Man Behind The Treasure" promotional material for the video game Uncharted 4: A Thief's End (2016).

The song's widespread use in film and television has been criticized as a narrative cliché for informing audiences that characters suffer from multiple personalities or cannot distinguish reality.

== Weekly charts ==
Chart	Peak position	Year
France (SNEP)	78	2013
UK Singles (Official Charts Company)	199	2014
UK Indie (Official Charts)	17	2022

== Personnel ==
- Black Francis – lead vocals, rhythm guitar
- Joey Santiago – lead guitar
- Kim Deal – bass guitar, backing vocals
- David Lovering – drums
- Steve Albini – production, engineering

Credits adapted from the Surfer Rosa liner notes and release credits.

== Certifications ==
Region	Certification	Certified units/sales
Canada (Music Canada)	3× Platinum	240,000^{‡}
Italy (FIMI) sales since 2009	Platinum	70,000^{‡}
New Zealand (RMNZ)	3× Platinum	90,000^{‡}
Spain (Promusicae)	Platinum	60,000^{‡}
United Kingdom (BPI) sales since 2004	Platinum	600,000^{‡}
United States (RIAA)	4× Platinum	4,000,000^{‡}
^{‡} Sales+streaming figures based on certification alone.
