= Steve Hoffman (sound engineer) =

American mastering engineer

- Born: December 4, 1951 (age 74); Los Angeles, California, U.S.
- Occupation: Mastering engineer
- Website: www.stevehoffman.tv

Steve Hoffman (born December 4, 1951) is an American audio mastering engineer.

== Career ==
Hoffman was born in Los Angeles in 1951. In the 1970s, he worked in radio before joining MCA Records as catalog research and development coordinator. For the next decade, he was responsible for compiling hundreds of budget cassette releases for MCA's Special Products division, with a focus was on jazz and big band recordings.

In 1984, Hoffman sent copies of several Buddy Holly master recordings to John Pickering of the Picks, the vocal group that had backed Holly on most of his early singles. The Picks overdubbed new vocal parts onto at least 60 recordings and sent them back to Hoffman at MCA, hoping MCA would have issued these "new" recordings as an album. This did not occur, and Hoffman was subsequently fired from MCA, reportedly for the unauthorized lending of the tapes of Pickering. In 1992, Pickering approached Viceroy Records to arrange for distribution of these recordings, but MCA made it clear that Pickering did not have legal clearance to release such recordings.

In 1985, Hoffman worked on a series of releases aimed at the CD market which bore the title "From the Original Master Tapes." This series included works of artists such as Buddy Holly, Bill Haley and John Coltrane. He also plied his trade with the Dunhill Compact Classics and Audio Fidelity labels.

== Approach ==
The adjustments Hoffman makes depend on the quality of the tape source and the equalization choices of the mixing engineer. While he avoids noise reduction, he does add subjective "colorations" through subtractive equalization and up to five layers of vacuum tube distortion.

== Website ==
Hoffman's official website is home to the Steve Hoffman Music Forums, one of the oldest and most popular Internet forums dedicated to music discussion. The forum contains discussions regarding gear, record collecting, music production, audio engineering and mastering, and general music discussion. Established in the early 2000s, Steve Hoffman Music Forums had over 55,000 members by 2016, increasing to over 137,000 members by 2026. The forum's "Music Corner" section is known for its detailed and animated discussions of music releases, including comparisons of different pressings of an album with regard to quality and rarity, down to the minutiae of factual errors in liner notes and label copy. Kenneth Womack called it "the longtime home of the most engaging Beatles conversations on the web".
