= Planet of Sound =

Single by Pixies

from the album Trompe le Monde
- A-side: "Planet of Sound"
- B-side: "Theme from NARC"; "Build High"; "Evil Hearted You"
- Released: May 28, 1991
- Recorded: 1991
- Studio: Master Control, Burbank; Pacifique, Burbank; Studio des dames, Paris; Blackwing, London
- Genre: Alternative rock; alternative metal
- Length: 2:09
- Label: Elektra
- Songwriter: Black Francis
- Producer: Gil Norton

Pixies singles chronology
"Dig for Fire" (1990)	"Planet of Sound" (1991)	"Alec Eiffel" (1991)

"Planet of Sound" is a song by the American alternative rock band Pixies, from their 1991 album Trompe le Monde. It was written and sung by frontman Black Francis and produced by Gil Norton during the album's recording sessions. "Planet of Sound" was released as the first single from Trompe le Monde in the US and UK. The single version is a different mix from the one included on the album. The lyrics reference the instrumental song "Classical Gas" by Mason Williams.

Pixies singer Black Francis later re-recorded the song for his 2004 solo album Frank Black Francis.

== Track listing ==
No.	Title	Writer(s)	Length
1.	"Planet of Sound"	Black Francis	2:09
2.	"Theme from Narc"	Brian L. Schmidt	1:48
3.	"Build High"	Francis	1:42
4.	"Evil Hearted You"	Graham Gouldman	2:37

== Chart performance ==
Chart (1991)	Peak position
Ireland (IRMA)	17
UK Singles (OCC)	27
