= Bossanova (Pixies album) =

Studio album by Pixies
- Released: August 13, 1990
- Recorded: 1989–1990
- Studios: Cherokee (Hollywood); Aire L.A. (Glendale, Calif.); Silverlake (Hollywood); Hansa Tonstudio (Berlin); Master Control (Burbank, Calif.)
- Genres: Alternative rock; space rock; grunge
- Length: 39:45
- Labels: 4AD; Elektra
- Producer: Gil Norton

Pixies chronology
Doolittle (1989)	Bossanova (1990)	Trompe le Monde (1991)

Singles from Bossanova
- 1. "Velouria" Released: July 16, 1990; 2. "Dig for Fire" Released: November 5, 1990

Bossanova is the third studio album by American alternative rock band Pixies. It was released on August 13, 1990, by English independent record label 4AD in the United Kingdom and by Elektra Records in the United States. Because of 4AD's independent status, major label Elektra handled distribution in the US.

Bossanova reached number 70 on the Billboard 200. The album peaked at number three in the UK Albums Chart. Two singles were released from Bossanova; "Velouria" and "Dig for Fire". Both charted on the Billboard Modern Rock Tracks chart in the US, at No. 4 and No. 11, respectively.

== Background ==
After Pixies finished touring for their second album, Doolittle (1989), in January 1990, band members Black Francis, Joey Santiago, and David Lovering moved from Boston to Los Angeles. Bassist Kim Deal stayed in the UK to record the Breeders' first album in January with producer Steve Albini, although she ultimately decided to travel out to Los Angeles with the rest of the group. Lovering stated that he, Santiago, and Francis moved to Los Angeles because that was where they intended to record their next album. The three band members lived in the Oakwood apartments, along with comic Garrett Morris and members of the band White Lion. Producer Gil Norton also moved into the apartment complex.

== Recording and production ==
Pixies started recording material for Bossanova at Cherokee Studios in February 1990, where the sessions ran into problems. Norton said that nothing could be recorded after 6 p.m. because the recording desk would pick up pirate radio stations. Norton decided to work on overdubs in another studio for a few days until the problem was corrected, but when he returned to Cherokee, he found that any time something was plugged into a guitar amplifier it would generate "this incredible hum". Norton refused to tell 4AD owner Ivo Watts-Russell about the problem until he felt he could address it. One day while visiting a bar, Norton and Santiago met producer Rick Rubin and informed him of their situation. Rubin had his secretary find another studio for the group, and the band continued recording at Master Control.

== Composition ==
Black Francis wrote one of the songs on the album, "Blown Away", in Spain in early June 1989 while on tour. The song was recorded with producer Gil Norton, who was specially flown in for the one-song session, at Hansa Tonstudio in Berlin, after their June 19 concert there.

In contrast to previous records, many songs were written in the studio and few demo recordings were created. Santiago said that the band only practiced for a two-week period, in contrast to previous albums, when the band would rehearse constantly in Boston. Black Francis noted, "So I was writing [lyrics] on napkins five minutes before I sang. Sometimes it's good, sometimes not. That's just the nature of that songwriting."

== Release ==
The album was released in August 1990 on 4AD in the UK, and jointly by 4AD and Elektra in the USA. After 4AD re-acquired sole distribution rights for Pixies' back catalog, a re-issued (although not remastered) CD appeared solely on 4AD in the US in 2004. Mobile Fidelity Sound Lab released a version in 2008 that was remastered from the original analog master tapes.

A remastered release of the album, featuring additional songs "Go Man Go" and an alternate recording of "Dig for Fire", is scheduled to release on September 11, 2026.

== Critical reception ==
Professional ratings
Review scores
Source	Rating
AllMusic	4.5/5 stars
Blender	5/5 stars
Entertainment Weekly	A−
Los Angeles Times	3/5 stars
NME	9/10
Pitchfork	9.1/10
Q	4/5 stars
Rolling Stone	3/5 stars
Select	4/5
The Village Voice	A

The UK reviews of Bossanova were generally positive. In his September 1990 review of Bossanova, Q's Mat Snow said that "the Pixies are masters of the calculated incongruity," and commented that "they give other rockers an object lesson in the first principles of how it should be done." Terry Staunton of NME noted that the album's production "leans towards the harsh garage grunge of Surfer Rosa, although the songs retain the strong melodies of Doolittle," and said that "Bossanova is the composite Pixies LP."

In comparison to the band's previous albums, Rolling Stone reviewer Moira McCormick described Bossanova as "more of a straight-ahead rock album – by the Pixies' standards, meaning it's still safely off the mainstream." Chris Willman of Los Angeles Times felt "the Pixies come off as a cross between art monsters Sonic Youth and moody nostalgiameister Chris Isaak--full of noise and rage and clever/off-putting deconstruction, but deferring to classic pop instincts at surprising turns." Robert Christgau, writing for The Village Voice said "they march out tunes so simple and confident and power riffs so grandly declamatory that you learn to understand the choruses by singing them. The beats are lively. The three-minute songs don't bash you over the head with their punk/pop brevity. Neither do the two-minute songs. If they weren't still a little gothic-surrealist they might even be too easy—but they ain't."

UK magazine Select made Bossanova their album of the year for 1990. The album is included in the book 1001 Albums You Must Hear Before You Die.

Jon Dolan of Blender called it "their sunniest record: “Velouria” is their greatest love song after “Gigantic”; “Ana” is a sand-speckled surfer idyll; and Francis unveils a newfound obsession with friendly aliens on the loony, affecting “The Happening”"

In 2025, the staff of Radio X included the album in its list of "The 10 most disappointing follow-up albums". They said: "The Boston band's third full-length outing isn't a bad album in itself, it's just not as era-defining as the previous effort, Doolittle."

== Track listing ==
All tracks are written by Black Francis, except where noted.

Bossanova track listing
No.	Title	Writer(s)	Length
1.	"Cecilia Ann"	The Surftones (Frosty Horton/Steve Hoffman)	2:05
2.	"Rock Music"		1:52
3.	"Velouria"		3:40
4.	"Allison"		1:17
5.	"Is She Weird"		3:01
6.	"Ana"		2:09
7.	"All Over the World"		5:27
8.	"Dig for Fire"		3:02
9.	"Down to the Well"		2:29
10.	"The Happening"		4:19
11.	"Blown Away"		2:20
12.	"Hang Wire"		2:01
13.	"Stormy Weather"		3:26
14.	"Havalina"		2:33
Total length:			39:45

== Personnel ==
Pixies

- Black Francis – vocals, rhythm guitar
- Joey Santiago – lead guitar
- Kim Deal – bass guitar, vocals
- David Lovering – drums, vocals

Additional musicians

- Robert F. Brunner – theremin ("Velouria", "Is She Weird")

Technical

- Gil Norton – producer
- Alistair Clay – engineer
- Steven Haigler – mixing
- Jack Benson – assistant engineer
- Gregg Barrett – assistant engineer
- Moses Schneider – assistant engineer
- Andrew Ballard – assistant engineer
- Scott Blockland – assistant engineer
- Howie Weinberg – mastering
- Vaughan Oliver / V23 – design
- Chris Bigg – design assistance
- Pirate Design – artwork
- Anne Garrigues – artwork
- Simon Larbalestier – photography
- Kevin Westenberg – photography

== Charts ==
Weekly chart performance
Chart (1990)	Peak position
Australian Albums (ARIA)	68
Dutch Albums (Album Top 100)	30
German Albums (Offizielle Top 100)	27
New Zealand Albums (RMNZ)	17
Swedish Albums (Sverigetopplistan)	45
UK Albums (Official Charts)	3
US Billboard 200	70

Weekly chart performance
Chart (2026)	Peak position
Croatian International Albums (HDU)	6

== Certifications and sales ==
Certifications and sales for Bossanova
Region	Certification	Certified units/sales
France (SNEP)	Gold	100,000^{*}
United Kingdom (BPI)	Gold	100,000^{^}
United States	—	281,000
^{*} Sales figures based on certification alone.^{^} Shipments figures based on certification alone.
