= Alec Eiffel =

Single by Pixies

from the album Trompe le Monde
- A-side: "Alec Eiffel"
- B-side: American version: "Letter to Memphis" (Instrumental); "Build High"; "Evil Hearted You"; International version: "Motorway to Roswell"; "Planet of Sound" (Live); "Tame" (Live)
- Released: 1991
- Recorded: 1991
- Studio: Master Control, Burbank; Pacifique, Burbank; Studio des dames, Paris; Blackwing, London
- Genre: Alternative rock
- Length: 2:50
- Label: Elektra
- Songwriter: Black Francis
- Producer: Gil Norton

Pixies singles chronology
"Planet of Sound" (1991)	"Alec Eiffel" (1991)	"Letter to Memphis" (1991)

"Alec Eiffel" is a song by the American alternative rock band Pixies, from their 1991 album Trompe le Monde. The song was written and sung by frontman Black Francis, produced by Gil Norton and recorded during the album's recording sessions. "Alec Eiffel" was released as a single in France, the United Kingdom, and the United States, and was their third single from the album.

== Composition ==
The song references the French engineer Alexandre Gustave Eiffel, who designed the Eiffel Tower and the Statue of Liberty; Francis thought it was a "fascinating subject" to compose a song about. Francis also mentioned another meaning of the song: "Because of Alexandre Gustave Eiffel, but also because it's funny: in Australia, you often say 'It's a smart Alec' for [sic] a guy who's nice but not very bright."

In Australia, Britain and the United States, a "smart Alec" is the exact opposite of Francis' description: someone who is intelligent, but mean or sarcastic.

== Video ==
The song's video features the band playing in a wind-tunnel, a reference to the "pioneer of aerodynamics", with physics formulae in the background.

== Critical reception ==
The British magazine Melody Maker later commented on Francis' songwriting technique and the song itself: "According to Charles, the song started with Eiffel, then he started to [sic] singing the words "Eiffel, rifle, trifle", and suddenly 'everything fell into place'. It's not certain whether lines like 'little Eiffel stands in the archway, even though it doesn't make no sense' are an observation of the lunacy of the architecture or the song itself, which features a Sixties' -style zither!" (Francis is actually singing "keeping low, it don't make no sense", rather than "even though" which answers Melody Maker's question.)

== Track listing ==
All tracks are written by Black Francis, except where noted.

French CD single and UK 12"/CD single
No.	Title	Length
1.	"Alec Eiffel" (On the French CD single, tracks one and two are switched.)	2:50
2.	"Motorway to Roswell"	4:43
3.	"Planet of Sound" (Live at Brixton Academy, July 26, 1991)	2:26
4.	"Tame" (Live at Brixton Academy, July 26, 1991)	2:27

UK 7" single
No.	Title	Length
1.	"Alec Eiffel"	2:50
2.	"Motorway to Roswell"	4:43

US CD single (1992)
No.	Title	Writer(s)	Length
1.	"Alec Eiffel"		2:50
2.	"Letter to Memphis" (Instrumental)		2:42
3.	"Build High"		1:43
4.	"Evil Hearted You"	Graham Gouldman	2:37
