= Trompe le Monde =

Studio album by Pixies
- Released: September 23, 1991
- Recorded: 1991
- Studios: Master Control, Burbank; Pacifique, Burbank; Studio des dames, Paris; Blackwing, London
- Genres: Alternative rock; punk rock; pop metal
- Length: 38:58
- Labels: 4AD, Elektra
- Producer: Gil Norton

Pixies chronology
Bossanova (1990)	Trompe le Monde (1991)	Pixies (2002)

Singles from Trompe le Monde
- 1. "Planet of Sound" Released: May 28, 1991; 2. "Alec Eiffel" Released: 1991; 3. "Letter to Memphis" Released: 1991; 4. "Head On" Released: 1991

Trompe le Monde (French for "Fool the World") is the fourth studio album by the American alternative rock band Pixies, released on September 23, 1991 on 4AD in the United Kingdom and on September 24, 1991, on Elektra Records in the United States. Recorded in Burbank, California, Paris and London, the album was produced by Gil Norton, and was the Pixies' final studio album before their break-up two years later. Additionally, it was the band's last album to feature founding bassist Kim Deal. A remastered release of the album, featuring additional songs "Brackish Boy" and "Punk Loop", was released on September 11, 2026.

== Composition ==
"Head On" is a cover version of the Jesus and Mary Chain track. It was released as a single and reached number 6 on the Billboard Modern Rock Tracks chart in the U.S.A.

"U-Mass" is a song about the University of Massachusetts Amherst, where Black Francis met Joey Santiago before dropping out to form Pixies. In a 2001 interview, Santiago recalled that the original guitar riff was written while they were still enrolled at the school.

Tracks like "Planet of Sound," "Trompe le Monde," "Space (I Believe In)," and "Subbacultcha" recall a heavier metal leaning sound. Planet of Sound was composed in Drop D tuning.

== Title ==
The album name comes from the title of the first track, "Trompe le Monde", a French phrase (pronounced [tʁɔ̃p lə mɔ̃d]) meaning "Fool the World". Unlike previous albums, the title of the album comes from the name of a song (rather than a song lyric), and is a play on the French phrase "Trompe-l'œil", a painting technique in which the painter fools the viewer into thinking objects presented are real, and also "trompe la mort", which means "daredevil" in French. On some versions of the CD, the title is erroneously printed as Tromp le Monde on the disc itself.

== Critical reception ==
Professional ratings
Review scores
Source	Rating
AllMusic	4.5/5 stars
Blender	4/5 stars
Chicago Tribune	4/4 stars
Entertainment Weekly	A−
Los Angeles Times	3.5/4 stars
NME	7/10
Pitchfork	9.4/10
Q	4/5 stars
The Rolling Stone Album Guide	4/5 stars
The Village Voice	A−

Michael Bonner of Lime Lizard described Trompe le Monde as "one of the best albums that you may very well ever hear" and "a strong contender for best album of the 20th century".

In a retrospective review, AllMusic writer Heather Phares noted the reduced role of Kim Deal, calling it "essentially Black Francis' solo debut". Tom Ewing of Freaky Trigger named Trompe le Monde his ninth favorite album of the 1990s, describing it as "clean-lined sci-fi popmetal, perpetually underrated."

== Track listing ==
All tracks are written by Black Francis, except where noted.

Trompe le Monde track listing
No.	Title	Writer(s)	Length
1.	"Trompe le Monde"		1:48
2.	"Planet of Sound"		2:06
3.	"Alec Eiffel"		2:50
4.	"The Sad Punk"		3:00
5.	"Head On"	Jim Reid, William Reid	2:13
6.	"U-Mass"		3:01
7.	"Palace of the Brine"		1:34
8.	"Letter to Memphis"		2:39
9.	"Bird Dream of the Olympus Mons"		2:48
10.	"Space (I Believe In)"		4:18
11.	"Subbacultcha"		2:09
12.	"Distance Equals Rate Times Time"		1:24
13.	"Lovely Day"		2:05
14.	"Motorway to Roswell"		4:43
15.	"The Navajo Know"		2:20
Total length:			38:58

"U-Mass"
is the sixth track from Trompe le Monde. This sample contains the end of the first verse and the chorus.

== Personnel ==
Pixies

- Black Francis – vocals, rhythm guitar
- Kim Deal – bass guitar, vocals
- David Lovering – drums
- Joey Santiago – lead guitar

Additional musicians

- Eric Drew Feldman – keyboards, synthetics
- Jef Feldman – tabla, doumbek ("Space (I Believe in)", "Lovely Day")

Technical

- Gil Norton – producer
- Steven Haigler – engineer
- Andrew Ballard – assistant engineer
- John McDonnell – assistant engineer
- Ken Gardner – assistant engineer
- Scott Blockland – assistant engineer
- Philipe Tousche – assistant engineer
- Vaughan Oliver / v23 – art direction, design
- Chris Bigg – design assistance
- Paul McMenamin – design assistance
- Simon Larbalestier – photography
- Steven Appleby – artwork (rockets)
- TPP Ltd. London – typesetting

== Charts ==
Chart performance for Trompe le Monde
Chart (1991)	Peak position
Australian Albums (ARIA)	61
Dutch Albums (Album Top 100)	26
German Albums (Offizielle Top 100)	35
New Zealand Albums (RMNZ)	20
Swedish Albums (Sverigetopplistan)	43
UK Albums (Official Charts)	7
US Billboard 200	92

2021 chart performance for Trompe le Monde
Chart (2021)	Peak position
Belgian Albums (Ultratop Flanders)	191
Belgian Albums (Ultratop Wallonia)	124

== Certifications and sales ==
Certifications and sales for Trompe le Monde
Region	Certification	Certified units/sales
France (SNEP)	Gold	100,000^{*}
United Kingdom (BPI)	Silver	60,000^{^}
United States	—	359,000
^{*} Sales figures based on certification alone.^{^} Shipments figures based on certification alone.
