= Monkey Gone to Heaven =

Song by Pixies

Single by Pixies

from the album Doolittle
- B-side: "Manta Ray"; "Weird at My School"; "Dancing the Manta Ray"
- Released: March 27, 1989
- Recorded: November, December 4, 1988
- Studio: Downtown Recorders, Boston, Massachusetts; Carriage House, Stamford, Connecticut
- Genre: Grunge
- Length: 2:56
- Label: Elektra
- Songwriter: Black Francis
- Producer: Gil Norton

Pixies singles chronology
"Gigantic" (1988)	"Monkey Gone to Heaven" (1989)	"Here Comes Your Man" (1989)

"Monkey Gone to Heaven" is a song by the American alternative rock band Pixies. Recorded in November 1988 during the sessions for the band's 1989 album Doolittle, it was released as a single in March, and included as the seventh track on the album when it was released a month later in April. The song was written and sung by frontman Black Francis and was produced by Gil Norton. Referencing environmentalism and biblical numerology, the song's lyrics mirrored themes that were explored in Doolittle. "Monkey Gone to Heaven" was the first Pixies song to feature guest musicians: two cellists, Arthur Fiacco and Ann Rorich, and two violinists, Karen Karlsrud and Corine Metter.

The band had signed to Elektra Records at the end of 1988, so the "Monkey Gone to Heaven" single was their first American and major label release. It was critically well-received; Rolling Stone's David Fricke said "Monkey Gone to Heaven" was "a corrosive, compelling meditation on God and garbage." In the years since its release, the song has received several accolades from music publications.

== Lyrics and meaning ==
"Monkey Gone to Heaven"'s main theme is environmentalism. The song mainly deals with humanity's destruction of the sky and ocean and "confusion of man's place in the universe." "On one hand, it's [the ocean] this big organic toilet. Things get flushed and repurified or decomposed and it's this big, dark, mysterious place," Black later said, "It's also a very mythological place where there are octopus's gardens, the Bermuda Triangle, Atlantis, and mermaids." Francis came up with the song's hook, "this monkey's gone to heaven," long before the song itself was written. The line itself forms a basis for the song, which revolves around humanity's relationship with the divine and environmentalism. After Francis set the developing lyrics to music, he rushed to lead guitarist Joey Santiago's apartment to play it to him. Santiago later commented on the nascent performance: "It was early in the morning, I was still so tired. [Francis said] 'Hey Joe, I need to come over. I need to show you something.' [...] It was awesome, really good. He had the 'If man is five' part there, and he was laughing. [...] It was hilarious."

"Monkey Gone to Heaven" includes references to numerology in the lyrics "If man is five/then the Devil is six/and God is seven". Francis later expanded on the significance of the lyrics in an interview to Alternative Press, saying "It's a reference from what I understand to be Hebrew numerology, and I don't know a lot about it or any of it really. I just remember someone telling me of the supposed fact that in the Hebrew language, especially in the Bible, you can find lots of references to man in the 5th and Satan in the 6th and God in the 7th. [...] I didn't go to the library and figure it out." The song's numerology is alluded to on the single's cover, which features figures of five, six and seven, and also a monkey with a halo.

Ben Sisario, author of Doolittle 33⅓, offers a slightly different interpretation of the song: "Neptune, the god of this realm [in reference to Francis' ocean comment], the 'underwater guy who controlled the sea,' hung out down there, the personification of man's relationship with the earth. And what happens to Neptune? He gets 'killed by ten million pounds of sludge from New York to New Jersey.' Same thing with the 'creature in the sky,' who gets stuck up there in a hole in the ozone layer. Man the divine manifestation effectively dies, and what remains is his degraded animal nature; the chintzy halo stuck on the primate's head is the symbol of that unhappy fall".

In February 2022, Black Francis elaborated on the song's meaning: "I guess it's loosely inspired by the so-called human dilemma of existence, our existential problem on whether we can survive as a race. But it's told without any agenda or judgment and mixes in some very loose biblical, sing-songy things because, you know, 'The devil is six and God is seven' rhymes with heaven. It's a nursery rhyme with mythological folk imagery. In oversimplified evolutionary terms, we are descended from apes and monkeys, so they are the animal we metaphorically most relate to because of this evolutionary kinship. So that's why it's not a bird or a fish gone to heaven."

== Structure ==
The cello part for the verses of "Monkey Gone to Heaven"

"Monkey Gone to Heaven" is written in the key of D major, and opens with Francis' rhythm guitar playing a short chord progression backed by the bass guitar of Kim Deal and drums of David Lovering. The guitar intensity fades as Francis begins to sing, leaving Deal's bassline and Lovering's steady drum-beat. Between each line of the verse, Francis pauses, leaving the drums and bass playing. Joey Santiago's lead guitar does not feature at all during the verses. By the end of the second line of each verse, the cello part joins in, following the bassline closely.

Pixies — "Monkey Gone to Heaven"
This sample contains the end of the second verse, the bridge and chorus.

As the first verse finishes, the opening chord progression is repeated. This leads into the chorus (where Francis and Deal repeat "This monkey's gone to heaven") with the lead guitar of Santiago playing two notes repeatedly. The two violins play a melody throughout, accompanied by a piano in the background. There is then a short solo by Santiago, who repeats the melody three times, to bridge the chorus and second verse. The second verse and chorus follow the same format. At the end of the second chorus, Francis shouts "Rock me, Joe!"; Santiago then begins a guitar solo lasting seventeen seconds, with backing violins for the second half of the solo.

After the solo, Francis sings "If man is five" several times. There is no backing, apart from the lead guitar, for several seconds, but then the song's chord progression is heard again. This is repeated for "If the devil is six". At the end of the second chord progression, the song's main backing restarts again, with Francis screaming "Then God is seven" as the chorus approaches. The final repeated chorus of "This monkey's gone to heaven" ends the song as the string section becomes more prominent.

== Recording and production ==
The band's parts were recorded at Downtown Recorders in Boston, Massachusetts. The string section of "Monkey Gone to Heaven" was recorded while Doolittle was being mixed at Carriage House Studios in Stamford, Connecticut. Gil Norton, the album's producer, was inspired to add a string section to the song after seeing Deal plucking the strings of a grand piano during recording. The production team, led by Norton, asked the studio owner John Montagnese to bring in string players for one evening session. The studio was often used for recording orchestral scores for B-movies such as Missing in Action (1984) and Silver Bullet (1985). Montagnese hired four classical musicians from a local orchestra for the recording, with the session taking place on the afternoon of December 4, 1988.

Arthur Fiacco, a cellist, arrived at Carriage House first. He was dressed in formal black and white attire, having traveled from an afternoon concert. Fiacco was surprised to find there were no scores written for the musicians to play; he then wrote a part based on riffs Francis had shown him. The violinists, Corinne Metter and Karen Karlsrud, also followed the directions of Francis and Norton. Ann Rorich was also credited for cello on the album and single, but Fiacco said he sent her home and performed all cello parts himself.

== Release and music video ==
"Monkey Gone to Heaven", the first single from Doolittle, was released to radio stations for rotation in April 1989 in the United States. The single reached number five on the US Modern Rock Tracks chart, with the help of Elektra Records' marketing. In the United Kingdom, "Monkey Gone to Heaven" was released on March 27, 1989, and spent three weeks in the UK chart, debuting at number 60.

The music video, the Pixies' first, features the band playing their instruments on a stage, with the camera alternating to focus on each band member. Filmed in black-and-white, "searchlights" cross the stage and several camera effects are used, such as slow-motion. The camera switches to color for a few seconds several times during the video, before reverting to black-and-white. Halfway through the video, fog appears on-stage, covering the band. The members of the string section are not seen in the video.

The song would later be re-recorded by Black Francis and released on his 2004 album Frank Black Francis.

== Reception ==
In general, "Monkey Gone to Heaven" received a positive critical reaction. British magazine NME, reviewing the UK 7-inch single in March 1989, said: "All the smart bastards are mixing strings with grunge guitars nowadays and the Pixies are no exception. Snarled vocals, sci-fi lyrics, and the usual molten lava flow of guitars burn another crater where your ears used to be. 'Monkey Gone to Heaven' pukes acid and poetry into America's AOR heartland before being splattered by the faster and more direct sting of the second track 'Manta Ray'." Upon the release of Doolittle in April 1989, NME's Edwin Pouncey added: "the wonderful 'Monkey Gone to Heaven' is laced with lush but unobtrusive strings which nibble round the edge of the song and push it into a new realm of arrangement for the band. The opportunity to give 'Monkey' the full Philharmonic treatment, complete with heavenly harp, must have been a temptation to them. Wisely such a folly has been resisted."

Q, in their review of Doolittle, described "Monkey Gone to Heaven": "It's not pretty, but its carefully structured noise and straight forward rhythmic insistence makes perfect sense: a gut feeling that is doubled when it gets within sniffing distance of a tune, as on 'Monkey Gone to Heaven' or 'Debaser'." Rolling Stone's David Fricke, reviewing Doolittle, said "Monkey Gone to Heaven" was "a corrosive, compelling meditation on God and garbage." The critical success of "Monkey Gone to Heaven" was also reflected commercially; the song reached number five on the Billboard Modern Rock Tracks chart, marking the Pixies' debut in the American charts. However, the song did not perform as well in the British charts, reaching a peak position of number 60 and falling off the charts after three weeks.

== Accolades ==
Publication	Country	Accolade	Year	Rank
Melody Maker	UK	Single of the Year	1989	1
NME	UK	Single of the Year	1989	22
Rolling Stone	US	Single of the Year	1989	5
The Village Voice	US	Single of the Year	1989	24
Rolling Stone	US	500 Greatest Songs of All Time	2004	410
NME	UK	50 Greatest Indie Anthems Ever	2007	35
Robert Dimery	US	1001 Songs You Must Hear Before You Die	2010	N/A
NME	UK	500 Greatest Songs Of All Time	2014	197

== Track listing ==
All songs were written by Black Francis.

UK 7-inch single

1. "Monkey Gone to Heaven" – 2:56
2. "Manta Ray" – 2:38

UK/US 12-inch/CD single

1. "Monkey Gone to Heaven" – 2:56
2. "Manta Ray" – 2:38
3. "Weird at My School" – 1:59
4. "Dancing the Manta Ray" – 2:13

== Personnel ==
Pixies

- Black Francis – lead vocals, rhythm guitar
- Joey Santiago – lead guitar
- Kim Deal – bass guitar, backing vocals, plucked piano strings
- David Lovering – drums

Additional musicians

- Karen Karlsrud – violin
- Corine Metter – violin
- Arthur Fiacco – cello
- Ann Rorich – cello

== Charts ==
Chart (1989)	Peak position
UK Singles (Official Charts)	60
US Alternative Airplay (Billboard)	5

== Certifications ==
Certifications
Region	Certification	Certified units/sales
United Kingdom (BPI)	Silver	200,000^{‡}
^{‡} Sales+streaming figures based on certification alone.

== See also ==
- "Fire Water Burn" by Bloodhound Gang references the song in its lyrics
- Southland Tales by Richard Kelly (director) shares similar plot elements as the lyrics
