= Downtown Recorders =

Recording studio in Boston

Coordinates: 42.3447°N 71.0714°W

Downtown Recorders is a recording studio in Boston, Massachusetts. Located in the city's Cyclorama building in the South End, it has been a focal point of the Boston music scene since the studio's inception in 1979 by two local musicians, Mitch Benoff and Benny Kay. Bands such as Georgee, the Pixies, Human Sexual Response and The Real Kids have recorded at the studio. The studio differs from many in that the control booth was installed at an angle to the main recording booth, and that there is no drum booth installed — the drummer performs with the rest of the band.
