= Gigantic (song) =

1988 single by Pixies

Single by Pixies

from the album Surfer Rosa
- A-side: "Gigantic" (new version)
- B-side: "River Euphrates" (new version); "Vamos" (live); "In Heaven (The Lady in the Radiator Song)" (live)
- Released: August 29, 1988
- Recorded: December 1987
- Studio: Q Division, Somerville, Massachusetts
- Genre: Alternative rock
- Length: 3:58 (album version); 3:13 (single version)
- Label: 4AD
- Songwriters: Kim Deal; Black Francis
- Producers: Steve Albini (album); Gil Norton (single)

Pixies singles chronology
"Gigantic" (1988)	"Monkey Gone to Heaven" (1989)
- "Gigantic" This sample contains the first bridge and chorus.

"Gigantic" is a song by the American alternative rock band Pixies, co-written by bassist Kim Deal and lead vocalist/guitarist Black Francis. The song appeared on the band's first full-length studio album, Surfer Rosa, released in 1988. One of the longest songs on the album, "Gigantic" was released as the band's first single on August 29, 1988.

Featuring Deal on lead vocals, the song is one of Pixies' biggest hits and a crowd favorite at concerts, often played as the encore. The melody line comes from Deal's simple but effective bass playing—the same bassline is repeated throughout the song.

"Gigantic" never achieved a ranking on any major charts and was their only single release from Surfer Rosa. However, it was a fairly successful first hit for Pixies and maintains radio play to this day. The single version of the song appeared on Pixies' 2004 best-of compilation, Wave of Mutilation: Best of Pixies.

== Lyrics and melody ==
According to Deal, the main inspiration for the song was the film Crimes of the Heart, in which a white married woman falls in love with a black teenager. The song is credited to Mrs. John Murphy (Kim Deal's pseudonym at the time of Come On Pilgrim and Surfer Rosa).

The song's lyrics mostly revolve around a woman's observation of an attractive black man having sex with another woman, culminating in the chorus: "Gigantic, gigantic, gigantic / A big, big love". Francis later commented on the title of the song and the chorus (in the music magazine Select), saying:

A good chord progression, very Lou Reed influenced. I'd had the word 'gigantic' in my mind just because the chord progression seemed very big to me.

The melody, particularly at the beginning, differs between the album and EP version.

== Single ==
4AD label executive Ivo Watts-Russell did not believe there was a track on Surfer Rosa that would get much radio play, so he approached producer Gil Norton to re-record "Gigantic" and "River Euphrates" with the intention of releasing them as the band's first single. It was the first time Norton would record with the Pixies, and the circumstances made him a bit nervous because he was a fan of the band and Steve Albini's work. Most of the changes he made were in the way the recordings were mixed while minor alterations were made in "Gigantic"'s arrangement. The single was released in the United Kingdom on 4AD as a 12-inch single and on CD. The CD version was re-issued in 1999. (No version of this single was ever released in the United States.) The single also included a live version of "Vamos" (a song that also appeared on mini-LP, Come On Pilgrim and their first LP Surfer Rosa) and a live cover of the song "In Heaven (The Lady in The Radiator Song)" from the David Lynch movie Eraserhead, both recorded at the Town and Country Club in London.

Based on the results of this re-recording, Gil Norton was asked to produce the next album, Doolittle. The back cover of the 12 inch features a large leather glove.

== Track listing ==
No.	Title	Writer(s)	Length
1.	"Gigantic" (new version)	Black Francis and Kim Deal	3:12
2.	"River Euphrates" (new version)	Black Francis	3:23
3.	"Vamos" (live)	Black Francis	3:28
4.	"In Heaven (The Lady in the Radiator Song)" (live)	Peter Ivers and David Lynch	1:46

== Cover versions ==
- In 1990, the Australian alternative rock band Tlot Tlot wrote a song called "Sunny Delirious" that sampled the intro of "Gigantic". In 1992, their debut album Pistolbuttsa'twinkle included the song, while their final single, "The Girlfriend Song", included an uptempo punk version of the song recorded live as a B-side.
- The California ska punk band Reel Big Fish produced a cover of "Gigantic" for 1999's Where Is My Mind?: A Tribute to the Pixies. Reel Big Fish chose to break away from their traditional sound for this cover, producing a very poppy, highly produced dance track sounding nothing like the original song. Other bands such as Belle & Sebastian, the Frames, Pavement, Gemma Hayes, the Katies, and the Hippos have also covered the song.
- The song was parodied by Self on the album Feels Like Breakin' Shit with a track titled "Titanic". The chorus mimics "Gigantic" with "Titanic, Titanic, Titanic / A big, big boat".
- In 2007, OK Go covered the song for album Dig for Fire: A Tribute to Pixies.
- In November 2009, Brighton-based indie band the Miserable Rich covered the song on their Covers EP, alongside three other 1980s covers.
- Swell Season vocalist Glen Hansard covered "Gigantic" live for the deluxe digital edition of their 2009 album Strict Joy.
- Alternative rock band Surfer Blood performed a version of the song in June 2011 for The A.V. Club's A.V. Undercover series.
- In April 2014, a cover of the song by Phoebe Bridgers, using many various iPhone and iPod performance and recording apps, was the subject of a widely broadcast advertisement by Apple Inc.
- In October 2014, the shoegaze/punk band Pity Sex covered the song as their second track on a split they released with Adventures on Run for Cover Records.
- Deal began performing the song with the Breeders in 2017, becoming a staple of the band's setlist therein.
