= Gil Norton =

British record producer

- Born: Liverpool, England
- Occupation: Record producer
- Website: web.archive.org/web/20050313102601/http://www.gilnorton.com

Gil Norton (born in Liverpool) is an English record producer known for his work with alternative rock bands such as Pixies, Echo & the Bunnymen, Foo Fighters, Tribe, Jimmy Eat World, Dashboard Confessional, Feeder, the Distillers, Maxïmo Park, Counting Crows, Terrorvision, the Triffids, Del Amitri, James, the Feelers, the Beekeepers, Twin Atlantic, General Fiasco, Span, Busted, Bayside, and Intergalactic Lovers.

== Discography ==
=== As producer ===
- Chain of Command, Some Aspects, Honour Among Thieves (1981)
- China Crisis, Difficult Shapes & Passive Rhythms, Some People Think It's Fun to Entertain (1982)
- Echo & the Bunnymen, Ocean Rain (1984)
- The Triffids, Born Sandy Devotional (1986)
- Martin Stephenson and the Daintees, Boat to Bolivia (1986)
- Throwing Muses, Throwing Muses (1986)
- The Triffids, Calenture (1987)
- Throwing Muses, Chains Changed (1987)
- Robert Holmes, Age of Swing (1989)
- Pixies, Doolittle (1989)
- Del Amitri, Waking Hours (1989) (one track, "Move Away Jimmy Blue")
- The Blue Aeroplanes, Swagger (1990)
- James, Gold Mother (1990) (one track, "Sit Down")
- Pixies, Bossanova (1990)
- Pale Saints, The Comforts of Madness (1990)
- Pere Ubu, Worlds in Collision (1991)
- Tribe, Abort (1991)
- Pixies, Trompe le Monde (1991)
- The Frames, Another Love Song (1991)
- Del Amitri, Change Everything (1992)
- Belly, Star (1993) (four tracks)
- Catherine Wheel, Chrome (1993)
- Terrorvision, How to Make Friends and Influence People (1994)
- The Fatima Mansions, Lost in the Former West (1994) (two tracks, "Walk in the Woods" and "Brain Blister")
- Blink, A Map of the Universe (1994) (one track, "It's Not My Fault")
- Catherine Wheel, Happy Days (1995)
- The Meices, Dirty Bird (1996)
- Terrorvision, Regular Urban Survivors (1996)
- Longpigs, The Sun Is Often Out (1996) (additional mix and production on "On and On")
- Honeycrack, Prozaic (1996)
- Counting Crows, Recovering the Satellites (1996)
- The Age of Electric, Make a Pest a Pet (1997)
- Foo Fighters, The Colour and the Shape (1997)
- Echobelly, Lustra (1997)
- The Beekeepers, Third Party, Fear and Theft (1998) (one track, "Do You Behave Like That at Home?")
- K's Choice, Cocoon Crash (1998)
- Cast, Magic Hour (1999)
- Patti Smith, Gung Ho (2000)
- SR-71, Now You See Inside (2000)
- Alien Crime Syndicate, From the Word Go (2000)
- Terris, Learning to Let Go (2001)
- Feeder, Echo Park (2001)
- Ed Harcourt, Here Be Monsters (2001)
- The Feelers, Communicate (2001)
- Feeder, Comfort in Sound (2002)
- Dashboard Confessional, A Mark, a Mission, a Brand, a Scar (2003)
- The Distillers, Coral Fang (2003)
- Span, Mass Distraction (2004)
- Alien Crime Syndicate, Ten Songs in the Key of Betrayal (2004)
- Jimmy Eat World, Futures (2004)
- Feeder, Pushing the Senses (2005)
- Son of Dork, Welcome to Loserville (2005)
- Morningwood, Morningwood (2006)
- Gomez, How We Operate (2006)
- Ben Kweller, Ben Kweller (2006)
- Maxïmo Park, Our Earthly Pleasures (2007)
- Funeral for a Friend, Tales Don't Tell Themselves (2007)
- Foo Fighters, Echoes, Silence, Patience & Grace (2007)
- Counting Crows, Saturday Nights & Sunday Mornings (2008)
- In Case of Fire, Align the Planets (2009)
- Eskimo Joe, Inshalla (2009)
- Brendan Benson, My Old, Familiar Friend (2009)
- Violent Soho, Violent Soho (2010)
- General Fiasco, Buildings (2010) (one track, "I'm Not Made of Eyes")
- Gyroscope, Cohesion (2010)
- Bayside, Killing Time (2011)
- Sum 41, Screaming Bloody Murder (2011) (uncredited additional drums production)
- Twin Atlantic, Free (2011)
- Futures, The Karma Album (2011)
- Pulled Apart by Horses, Tough Love (2012)
- You Me at Six, "The Swarm" (2012)
- Maxïmo Park, The National Health (2012)
- Pure Love, Anthems (2013)
- Surfer Blood, Pythons (2013)
- Pixies, EP1 (2013)
- AFI, Burials (2013)
- The People The Poet, The Narrator (2013) (two tracks, "Sing" and "Molly Drove Me Away")
- Pixies, EP2 (2014)
- Pixies, Indie Cindy (2014)
- Twin Atlantic, Great Divide (2014)
- Stornoway, Bonxie (2015)
- The Virginmarys, Divides (2016)
- Band of Skulls, By Default (2016)
- Intergalactic Lovers, Exhale (2017)
- Busted, Half Way There (2019)
- Higher Power, 27 Miles Underwater (2020)
- The Hunna, “The Hunna” (2022)
