= Stab in the back (disambiguation) =

A stab in the back may refer to:

- The argument that Ottoman Christian population committed treason during World War I, justifying their killing (see Armenian genocide denial)
- In Richard Wagner's opera Götterdämmerung, the killing of the hero Siegfried by a spear thrust in his back.
- The Stab-in-the-back myth, the belief that the German Army did not lose World War I militarily, but was defeated by a treasonous "stab in the back" by civilians, in particular Jews and Socialists.
- Vietnam stab-in-the-back myth, a similar belief concerning the United States' loss of the Vietnam War
- "Stab in the Back" (song), by Terrorvision from How to Make Friends and Influence People (1994)
