= Oblivion (Terrorvision song) =

1994 single by Terrorvision

Single by Terrorvision

from the album How to Make Friends and Influence People
- B-side: "The Model"; "Remember Zelda"; "Problem Solved" (by Die Cheerleader); "What Do You Do That For?"
- Released: 28 March 1994
- Genre: Britpop
- Length: 3:03
- Label: Total Vegas; EMI
- Songwriter: Terrorvision
- Producer: Gil Norton

Terrorvision singles chronology
"My House" (1993)	"Oblivion" (1994)	"Middleman" (1994)

Audio
- "Oblivion" on YouTube

"Oblivion" is a song by English rock band Terrorvision. Written by the band and produced by Gil Norton, the song was included as the second track on the band's second studio album, How to Make Friends and Influence People (1994). Like most Terrorvision songs, "Oblivion" contains political themes, but according to bass player Leigh Marklew, the messages were not taken seriously because of the song's doo-wop chorus. Released as the album's first single on 28 March 1994, the song peaked at number 21 on the UK Singles Chart and number 65 in Australia.

== Release and reception ==
On 28 March 1994, "Oblivion" was issued as the lead single from How to Make Friends and Influence People. When the album was released on 18 April 1994, "Oblivion" appeared as the second track. According to AllMusic reviewer Leslie Mathew, the song is a satirical critique on "squatter hippies". Upon the single's release, Music & Media magazine likened the song to the Smithereens' "Top of the Pops" (1991) and called it "hard-to-forget" with "instant 'got-ya' quality". Danny Martin of WhatCulture praised the song's chorus, referring to it as "singalong perfection", as well as Tony Wright's vocals, calling them a "perfect vessel" for the track's offbeat lyrics.

On 3 April 1994, the single debuted at number 47 on the UK Singles Chart. The following week, it rose to its highest position of number 21, becoming Terrorvision's highest-charting single in the UK until February 1996, when "Perseverance" reached number five. "Oblivion" spent six weeks on the UK Singles Chart and is the band's second-longest-charting single in the UK, after 1999's "Tequila". Its British sales registered on the Eurochart Hot 100, peaking at number 72 on the issue dated 30 April 1994. In Australia, "Oblivion" was released on 20 June 1994 and became Terrorvision's only song to enter the top 100 of the ARIA Singles Chart, reaching number 65 that September.

== Track listings ==
UK CD1

1. "Oblivion"
2. "The Model" (with Die Cheerleader)
3. "Remember Zelda"

UK CD2 and Australian CD single

1. "Oblivion"
2. "Problem Solved" (by Die Cheerleader)
3. "What Do You Do That For?"
4. "Oblivion" (demo)

UK 7-inch single

A. "Oblivion"
B. "What Do You Do That For?"

UK 12-inch single

A1. "Oblivion"
A2. "The Model" (with Die Cheerleader)
B1. "Remember Zelda"
B2. "Problem Solved" (by Die Cheerleader)

French CD and 7-inch single

A. "Oblivion"
B. "The Model" (with Die Cheerleader)

== Credits and personnel ==
Credits are adapted from the How to Make Friends and Influence People booklet and the UK CD1 liner notes.

Studio

- Mixed at The Church (London, England)

Personnel

- Terrorvision – writing, arrangement
  - Tony Wright – vocals
  - Shutty – drums
  - Mark Yates – guitars
  - Leigh Marklew – bass
- Anita Madigan – backing vocals
- Gil Norton – production, mixing
- Chris Sheldon – mixing
- Elliot Ness – mixing assistance
- John McDonnell – mixing assistance
- Al Clay – engineering
- Mike Cyr – engineering assistance
- Mark Phythian – programming
- Union Design – artwork design
- Toby McFarlan Pond – photography

== Charts ==
Weekly chart performance for "Oblivion"
Chart (1994)	Peak position
Australia (ARIA)	65
Europe (Eurochart Hot 100)	72
Scottish Singles Sales (Official Charts)	26
UK Singles (Official Charts)	21
