= Stab-in-the-back myth =

Antisemitic conspiracy theory promulgated in Germany after World War I

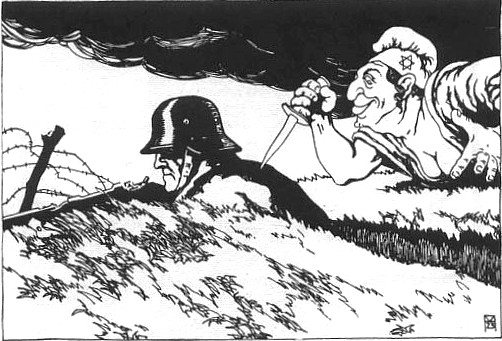
An illustration from a 1919 Austrian postcard showing a caricatured Jew, stabbing a German Army soldier in the back with a dagger. The capitulation of the Central Powers was blamed on communists, Bolsheviks, and the Weimar Republic, but in particular on Jews.

The stab-in-the-back myth (German: Dolchstoßlegende, pronounced [ˈdɔlçʃtoːsleˌɡɛndə], lit. 'dagger-stab legend') (Note: Despite the similarity of the German word Legende and the English word "legend", "stab-in-the-back myth" is the most common term in English.) is an antisemitic and anti-communist conspiracy theory that was widely believed and promulgated in Germany after 1918. It maintained that the Imperial German Army did not lose World War I on the battlefield, but was instead betrayed by certain citizens on the home front – especially Jews, revolutionary socialists who fomented strikes and labour unrest, and republican politicians who had overthrown the House of Hohenzollern in the German Revolution of 1918–1919. Advocates of the myth denounced the German government leaders who had signed the Armistice of 11 November 1918 as the "November criminals" (Novemberverbrecher).

When Adolf Hitler and the Nazi Party rose to power in 1933, they made the conspiracy theory an integral part of their official history of the 1920s, portraying the Weimar Republic as the work of the "November criminals" who had "stabbed the nation in the back" in order to seize power. Nazi propaganda depicted Weimar Germany as "a morass of corruption, degeneracy, national humiliation, ruthless persecution of the honest 'national opposition'—fourteen years of rule by Jews, Marxists, and 'cultural Bolsheviks', who had at last been swept away by the National Socialist movement under Hitler and the victory of the 'national revolution' of 1933".

While recognising that economic and morale collapse on the home front was a factor in German defeat, historians reject the myth. Instead, they point to lack of further Imperial German Army reserves, the danger of invasion from the south, and the overwhelming of German forces on the western front by more numerous Allied forces, particularly after the entrance of the United States into the war, as evidence that Germany had already lost the war militarily by late 1918.

== Background ==
In the later part of World War I, the Supreme High Command (Oberste Heeresleitung, OHL) controlled not only the military but also a large part of the economy through the Auxiliary Services Act of December 1916, which under the Hindenburg Programme aimed at a total mobilisation of the economy for war production. In order to implement the Act, however, Generalfeldmarschall Paul von Hindenburg and his Chief-of-Staff First Quartermaster General Erich Ludendorff had to make significant concessions to labour unions and the Reichstag. Hindenburg and Ludendorff threatened to resign in July 1917 if the Emperor did not remove Chancellor Theobald von Bethmann Hollweg. He had lost his usefulness to them when he lost the confidence of the Reichstag after it passed the Reichstag Peace Resolution calling for a negotiated peace without annexations. Bethmann Hollweg resigned and was replaced by Georg Michaelis, whose appointment was supported by the OHL. After only 100 days in office, however, he became the first chancellor to be ousted by the Reichstag.

After years of fighting and having incurred millions of casualties, the United Kingdom and France were wary about an invasion of Germany with its unknown consequences. However, the Allies had been amply resupplied by the United States, which had fresh armies ready for combat. On the Western Front, although the Hindenburg Line had been penetrated and German forces were in retreat, the Allied armies had only crossed the 1914 German frontier in a few places in Alsace-Lorraine (see below map). Meanwhile, on the Eastern Front, Germany had already won its war against Russia, concluded with the Treaty of Brest-Litovsk. In the West, Germany had successes with the Spring Offensive of 1918 but the attack had run out of momentum, the Allies had regrouped and in the Hundred Days Offensive retaken lost ground with no sign of stopping. Contributing to the Dolchstoßlegende, the overall failure of the German offensive was blamed on strikes in the arms industry at a critical moment, leaving soldiers without an adequate supply of materiel. The strikes were seen as having been instigated by treasonous elements, with the Jews taking most of the blame.

The weakness of Germany's strategic position was exacerbated by the rapid collapse of the other Central Powers in late 1918, following Allied victories on the Macedonian and Italian fronts. Bulgaria was the first to sign an armistice on 29 September 1918, at Salonica. On 30 October the Ottoman Empire capitulated at Mudros. On 3 November Austria-Hungary sent a flag of truce to the Italian Army to ask for an armistice. The terms, arranged by telegraph with the Allied Authorities in Paris, were communicated to the Austro-Hungarian commander and accepted. The armistice with Austria-Hungary was signed in the Villa Giusti, near Padua, on 3 November. Austria and Hungary signed separate treaties following the collapse of the Austro-Hungarian empire.

Importantly the Austro-Hungarian capitulation left Germany's southern frontier under threat of Allied invasion from Austria. Indeed, on 4 November the Allies decided to prepare an advance across the Alps by three armies towards Munich from Austrian territory within five weeks.

After the last German offensive on the Western Front failed in 1918, Hindenburg and Ludendorff admitted that the war effort was doomed, and they pressed Kaiser Wilhelm II for an armistice to be negotiated, and for a rapid change to a civilian government in Germany. They began to take steps to deflect the blame for losing the war from themselves and the German Army to others. Ludendorff said to his staff on 1 October:

I have ... asked His Majesty to include in the government those circles who are largely responsible for things having developed as they have. We will now see these gentlemen move into the ministries. Let them be the ones to sign the peace treaty that must now be negotiated. Let them eat the soup that they have cooked for us! (Note: Original: Ich habe aber S.M. gebeten, jetzt auch diejenigen Kreise an die Regierung zu bringen, denen wir es in der Hauptsache zu danken haben, daß wir so weit gekommen sind. Wir werden also diese Herren jetzt in die Ministerien einziehen sehen. Die sollen nun den Frieden schließen, der jetzt geschlossen werden muß. Sie sollen die Suppe jetzt essen, die sie uns eingebrockt haben!)

In this way, Ludendorff was setting up the republican politicians – many of them Socialists – who would be brought into the government, and would become the parties that negotiated the armistice with the Allies, as the scapegoats to take the blame for losing the war, instead of himself and Hindenburg. Normally, during wartime an armistice is negotiated between the military commanders of the hostile forces, but Hindenburg and Ludendorff had instead handed this task to the new civilian government. The attitude of the military was "[T]he parties of the left have to take on the odium of this peace. The storm of anger will then turn against them," after which the military could step in again to ensure that things would once again be run "in the old way".

On 5 October, the German Chancellor, Prince Maximilian of Baden, contacted U.S. President Woodrow Wilson, indicating that Germany was willing to accept his Fourteen Points as a basis for discussions. Wilson's response insisted that Germany institute parliamentary democracy, give up the territory it had gained to that point in the war, and significantly disarm, including giving up the German High Seas Fleet. On 26 October, Ludendorff was dismissed from his post by the Emperor and replaced by Lieutenant General Wilhelm Groener, who started to prepare the withdrawal and demobilisation of the army.

On 11 November 1918, the representatives of the newly formed Weimar Republic – created after the Revolution of 1918–1919 forced the abdication of the Kaiser – signed the armistice that ended hostilities. The military commanders had arranged it so that they would not be blamed for suing for peace, but the republican politicians associated with the armistice would: the signature on the armistice document was that of Matthias Erzberger, who was later murdered for his alleged treason. In his autobiography, Ludendorff's successor Groener stated, "It suited me just fine when the army and the Supreme Command remained as guiltless as possible in these wretched truce negotiations, from which nothing good could be expected".

Given that the heavily censored German press had carried nothing but news of victories throughout the war, and that Germany itself was unoccupied while occupying a great deal of foreign territory, it was little wonder that the German public was mystified by the request for an armistice, especially as they did not know that their military leaders had asked for it, nor did they know that the German Army had been in full retreat after their last offensive had failed.

Thus the conditions were set for the "stab-in-the-back myth", in which Hindenburg and Ludendorff were held to be blameless, the German Army was seen as undefeated on the battlefield, and the republican politicians – especially the Socialists – were accused of betraying Germany. Further blame was laid at their feet after they signed the Treaty of Versailles in 1919, which led to territorial losses and serious financial pain for the shaky new republic, including a crippling schedule of reparation payments.

Conservatives, nationalists, and ex-military leaders began to speak critically about the peace and Weimar politicians, socialists, communists, and Jews. Even Catholics were viewed with suspicion by some due to their supposed fealty to the Pope and their presumed lack of national loyalty and patriotism. It was claimed that these groups had not sufficiently supported the war and had played a role in selling out Germany to its enemies. These November Criminals, or those who seemed to benefit from the newly formed Weimar Republic, were seen to have "stabbed them in the back" on the home front, either by criticising German nationalism, instigating unrest and mounting strikes in the critical military industries, or by profiteering. These actions were believed to have deprived Germany of almost certain victory at the eleventh hour.

== Assessments of Germany's situation in late 1918 ==
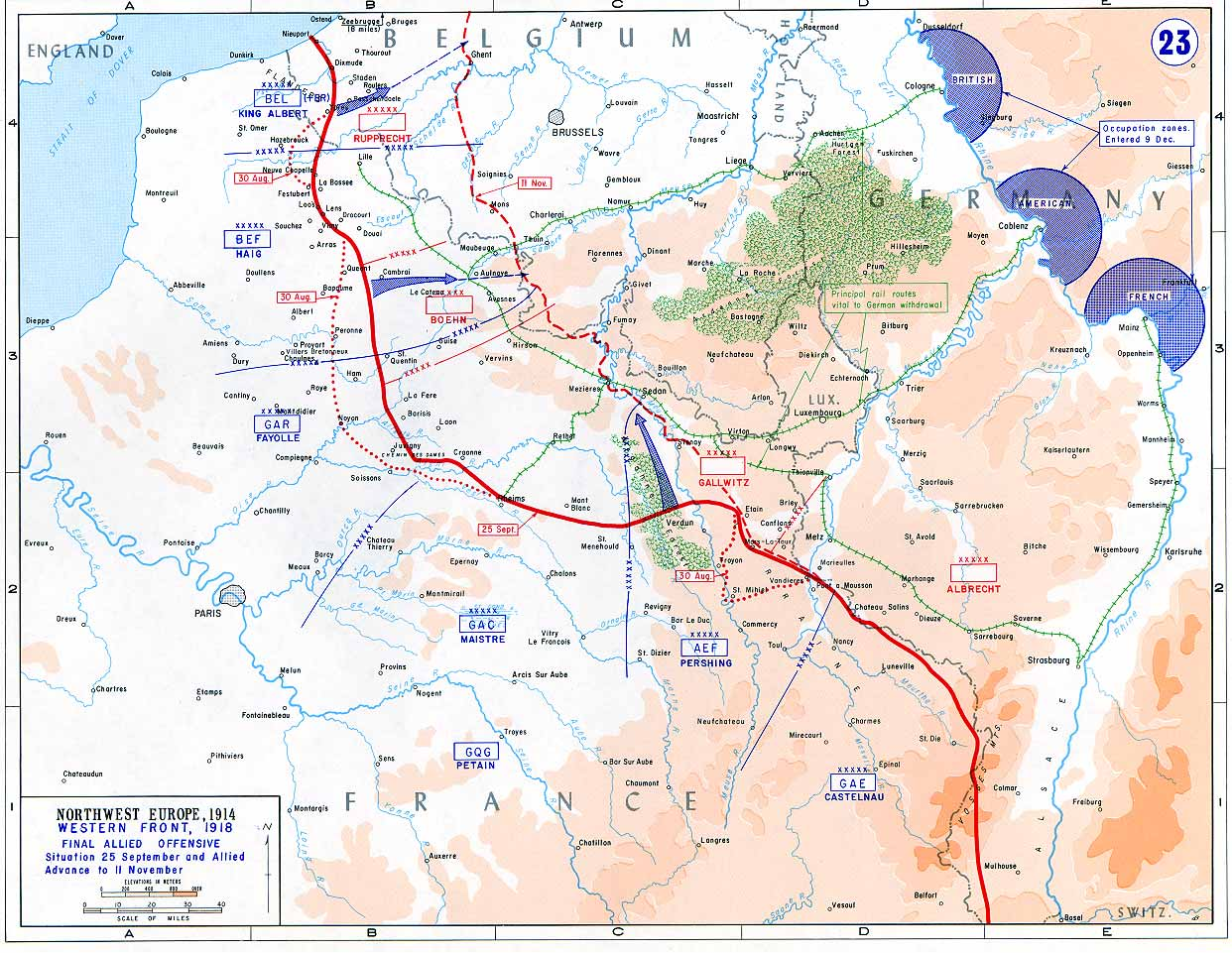
Map showing the Western Front as it stood on 11 November 1918. The German frontier of 1914 had been crossed in the vicinities of Mulhouse, Château-Salins, and Marieulles in Alsace-Lorraine.

=== Contemporary ===
When consulted on terms for an armistice in October 1918, Douglas Haig, commander of the British and Commonwealth forces on the western front, stated that "Germany is not broken in the military sense. During the last weeks her forces have withdrawn fighting very bravely and in excellent order". Ferdinand Foch, Supreme Allied Commander, agreed with this assessment, stating that "the German army could undoubtedly take up a new position, and we could not prevent it". When asked about how long he believed it would take for German forces to be pushed across the Rhine, Foch responded "Maybe three, maybe four or five months, who knows?".

In private correspondence Haig was more sanguine. In a mid-October letter to his wife he stated that "I think we have their army beaten now". Haig noted in his diary for 11 November 1918 that the German army was in "very bad" condition due to insubordination and indiscipline in the ranks.

British army intelligence in October 1918 assessed the German reserves as being very limited, with only 20 divisions for the whole western front of which only five were rated as "fresh". However, they also highlighted that the German Class of 1920 (i.e., the class of young men due to be conscripted in 1920 under normal circumstances, but called up early) was being held back as an additional reserve and would be absorbed into German divisions in the winter of 1918 if the war continued. Aerial reconnaissance also highlighted the lack of any prepared fortified positions beyond the Hindenburg line. A report from the retired German general Montgelas, who had previously contacted British intelligence to discuss peace overtures, stated that "The military situation is desperate, if not hopeless, but it is nothing compared to the interior condition due to the rapid spread of Bolshevism".

=== Post-war ===
Writing in 1930, the British military theorist Basil Liddell Hart wrote that:

The German acceptance of these severe terms [i.e., the Armistice terms] was hastened less by the existing situation on the western front than by the collapse of the "home front," coupled to exposure to a new thrust in the rear through Austria.

Analysing the role that developments on the western front had played in the German decision to capitulate, Hart emphasised particularly the importance of new military threats to Germany that they were ill-equipped to meet, alongside developments within Germany, stating that:

More truly significant was the decision on November 4, after Austria’s surrender, to prepare a concentric advance on Munich by three Allied armies, which would be assembled on the Austro-German frontier within five weeks. In addition Trenchard’s Independent Air Force was about to bomb Berlin: on a scale hitherto unattempted in air warfare. And the number of American troops in Europe had now risen to 2,085,000, and the number of divisions to forty-two, of which thirty-two were ready for battle.

German historian Imanuel Geiss also emphasised the importance of the Austro-Hungarian collapse, alongside internal factors affecting Germany, in the final decision by Germany to make peace:

Whatever doubts may have lingered in German minds about the necessity of laying down arms they were definitely destroyed by events inside and outside Germany. On 27th October Emperor Karl threw up the sponge [...] Germany lay practically open to invasion through Bohemia and Tyrol into Silesia, Saxony, and Bavaria. To wage war on foreign soil was one thing, to have the destructions of modern warfare on German soil was another.

Geiss further linked this threat to Germany's borders with the fact that the German revolutionary movement emerged first in the lands that were most threatened by the new invasion threat – Bavaria and Saxony. In Geiss's account, this led to the two competing movements for peace – one "from above" of establishment figures that wished to use the peace to preserve the status quo, and one "from below" that wished to use the peace to establish a socialist, democratic state.

Naval historian and first world war Royal Navy veteran Captain S.W. Roskill assessed the situation at sea as follows:

There is no doubt at all that in 1918 Allied anti-submarine forces inflicted a heavy defeat on the U-boats ... the so-called 'stab in the back' by the civil population's collapse is a fiction of German militaristic imagination

Although Roskill also balanced this by saying that what he characterised as "the triumph of unarmed forces" (i.e., pressure from the German civilian population for peace under the influence of the Allied blockade) was a factor in Allied victory alongside that of armed forces including naval, land, and air forces.

== Development of the myth ==
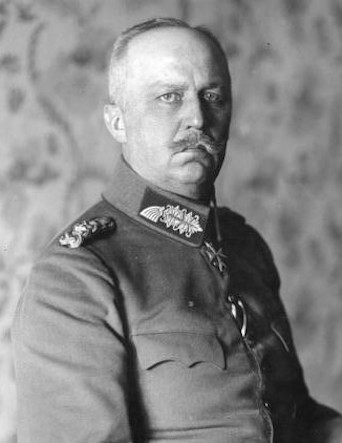
First Quartermaster General Erich Ludendorff

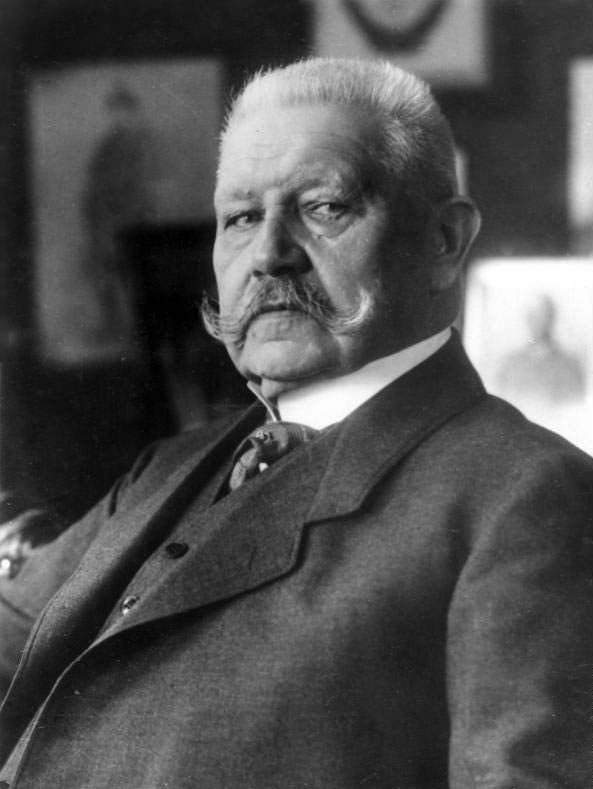
Field Marshal Paul von Hindenburg

Ludendorff and Hindenburg, supreme commanders of the German Army, were primarily responsible for the creation and popularization of the myth that the army was not defeated on the battlefield, but was betrayed on the German home front.

According to historian Richard Steigmann-Gall, the stab-in-the-back concept can be traced back to a sermon preached on 3 February 1918, by Protestant Court Chaplain Bruno Doehring, nine months before the war had ended. German scholar Boris Barth, in contrast to Steigmann-Gall, implies that Doehring did not actually use the term, but spoke only of 'betrayal'. Barth traces the first documented use to a centrist political meeting in the Munich Löwenbräukeller on 2 November 1918, in which Ernst Müller-Meiningen, a member of the Progressive People's Party in the Reichstag, used the term to exhort his listeners to hold out after Kurt Eisner of the radical left Independent Social Democratic Party had predicted an imminent revolution:

As long as the front holds, we damned well have the duty to hold out in the homeland. We would have to be ashamed of ourselves in front of our children and grandchildren if we attacked the battle front from the rear and gave it a dagger-stab (wenn wir der Front in den Rücken fielen und ihr den Dolchstoß versetzten).

Also in November 1918, a major in the German General Staff, Ludwig Beck, observed:

At the most crucial moment of the war we were assaulted from behind by a revolution that – I now realize without a shadow of a doubt – had been thoroughly prepared beforehand.

In a matter of weeks, the rumors and falsifications connected to this idea appeared in the newspaper Neue Zürcher Zeitung, headlined as "Stab in the Back" (Dolchstoß).

However, the widespread dissemination and acceptance of the "stab-in-the-back" myth came about through its use by Germany's highest military echelon. In Spring 1919, Max Bauer – an army colonel who had been the primary adviser to Ludendorff on politics and economics – published Could We Have Avoided, Won, or Broken Off the War?, in which he wrote that "[The war] was lost only and exclusively through the failure of the homeland." The birth of the specific term "stab-in-the-back" itself can possibly be dated to the autumn of 1919, when Ludendorff was dining with the head of the British Military Mission in Berlin, British general Sir Neill Malcolm. Malcolm asked Ludendorff why he thought Germany lost the war. Ludendorff replied with his list of excuses, including that the home front failed the army.

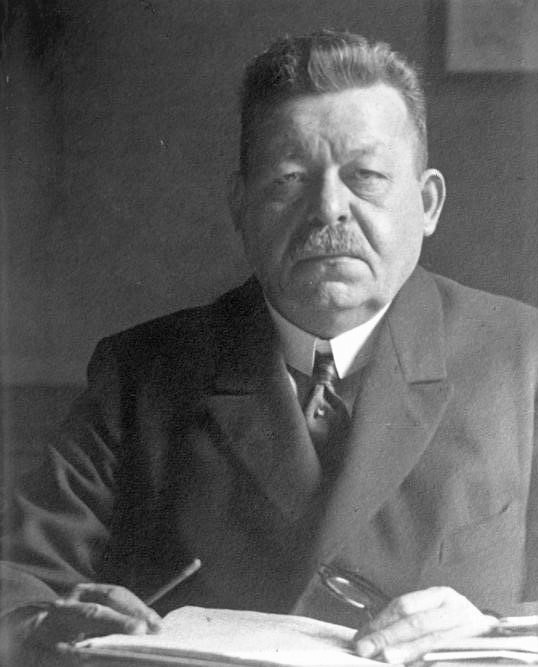
Friedrich Ebert contributed to the myth when he told returning veterans that "No enemy has vanquished you."

Malcolm asked him: "Do you mean, General, that you were stabbed in the back?" Ludendorff's eyes lit up and he leapt upon the phrase like a dog on a bone. "Stabbed in the back?" he repeated. "Yes, that's it, exactly, we were stabbed in the back". And thus was born a legend which has never entirely perished.

The phrase was to Ludendorff's liking, and he let it be known among the general staff that this was the "official" version, which led to it being spread throughout German society. It was picked up by right-wing political factions, and was even used by Kaiser Wilhelm II in the memoirs he wrote in the 1920s. Right-wing groups used it as a form of attack against the early Weimar Republic government, led by the Social Democratic Party (SPD), which had come to power with the abdication of the Kaiser. However, even the SPD had a part in furthering the myth when Reichspräsident Friedrich Ebert, the party leader, told troops returning to Berlin on 10 November 1918 that "No enemy has vanquished you," (kein Feind hat euch überwunden!) and "they returned undefeated from the battlefield" (sie sind vom Schlachtfeld unbesiegt zurückgekehrt). The latter quote was shortened to im Felde unbesiegt (undefeated on the battlefield) as a semi-official slogan of the Reichswehr. Ebert had meant these sayings as a tribute to the German soldier, but it only contributed to the prevailing feeling.

The myth was further developed after the British general Frederick Maurice's The Last Four Months was published in 1919. German reviews of the book misrepresented it as proving that the German army had been betrayed on the home front by being "dagger-stabbed from behind by the civilian populace" (von der Zivilbevölkerung von hinten erdolcht), an interpretation that Maurice disavowed in the German press to no effect. According to William L. Shirer, Ludendorff used the reviews of the book to convince Hindenburg about the validity of the myth.

On 18 November 1919, Ludendorff and Hindenburg appeared before the Committee of Inquiry into Guilt for World War I (Untersuchungsausschuss für Schuldfragen des Weltkrieges) of the newly elected Weimar National Assembly, which was investigating the causes of the war and Germany's defeat. The two generals appeared in civilian clothing, explaining publicly that to wear their uniforms would show too much respect to the commission. Hindenburg refused to answer questions from the chairman, and instead read a statement that had been written by Ludendorff. In his testimony he cited what Maurice was purported to have written, which provided his testimony's most memorable part. Hindenburg declared at the end of his – or Ludendorff's – speech: "As an English general has very truly said, the German Army was 'stabbed in the back'".

Furthering, the specifics of the stab-in-the-back myth are mentioned briefly by Kaiser Wilhelm II in his memoir:

I immediately summoned Field Marshal von Hindenburg and the Quartermaster General, General Groener. General Groener again announced that the army could fight no longer and wished rest above all else, and that, therefore, any sort of armistice must be unconditionally accepted; that the armistice must be concluded as soon as possible, since the army had supplies for only six to eight days more and was cut off from all further supplies by the rebels, who had occupied all the supply storehouses and Rhine bridges; that, for some unexplained reason, the armistice commission sent to France—consisting of Erzberger, Ambassador Count Oberndorff, and General von Winterfeldt—which had crossed the French lines two evenings before, had sent no report as to the nature of the conditions.

Hindenburg, Chief of the German General Staff at the time of the Ludendorff Offensive, also mentioned this event in a statement explaining the Kaiser's abdication:

The conclusion of the armistice was directly impending. At moment of the highest military tension revolution broke out in Germany, the insurgents seized the Rhine bridges, important arsenals, and traffic centres in the rear of the army, thereby endangering the supply of ammunition and provisions, while the supplies in the hands of the troops were only enough to last for a few days. The troops on the lines of communication and the reserves disbanded themselves, and unfavourable reports arrived concerning the reliability of the field army proper.

It was particularly this testimony of Hindenburg that led to the widespread acceptance of the Dolchstoßlegende in post-World War I Germany.

== Antisemitic aspects ==
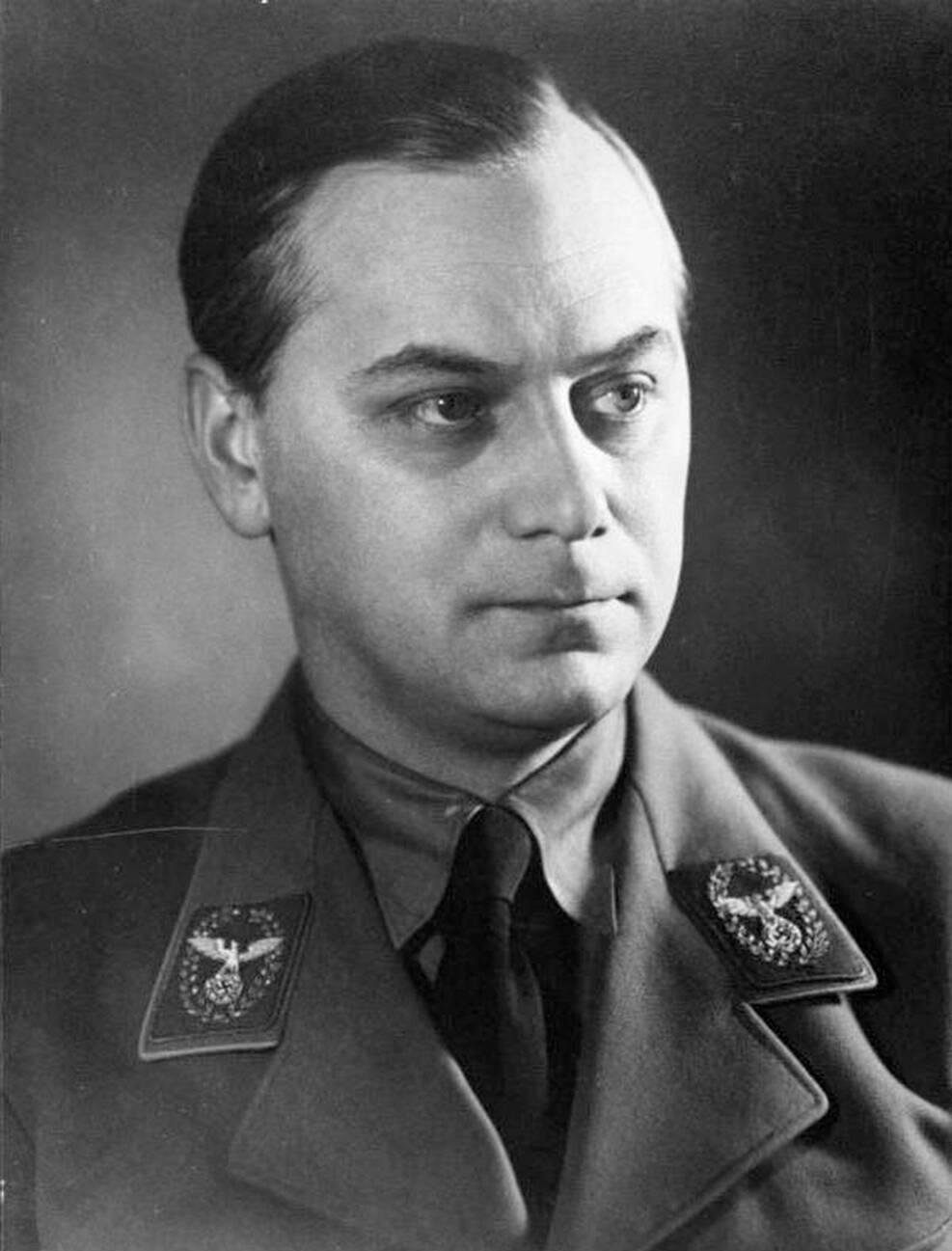
Nazi theorist Alfred Rosenberg was one of many on the far-right who spread the stab-in-the-back myth.

The antisemitic instincts of the German Army were revealed well before the stab-in-the-back myth became the military's excuse for losing the war. In October 1916, in the middle of the war, the army ordered a Jewish census of the troops, with the intent to show that Jews were under-represented in the Heer (army), and that they were over-represented in non-fighting positions. Instead, the census showed just the opposite, that Jews were over-represented both in the army as a whole and in fighting positions at the front. The Imperial German Army then suppressed the results of the census.

Charges of a Jewish conspiratorial element in Germany's defeat drew heavily upon figures such as Kurt Eisner, a Berlin-born German Jew who lived in Munich. He had written about the illegal nature of the war from 1916 onward, and he also had a large hand in the Munich revolution until he was assassinated in February 1919. The Weimar Republic under Friedrich Ebert violently suppressed workers' uprisings with the help of Gustav Noske and Reichswehr general Wilhelm Groener, and tolerated the paramilitary Freikorps forming all over Germany. In spite of such tolerance, the Republic's legitimacy was constantly attacked with claims such as the stab-in-the-back. Many of its representatives such as Matthias Erzberger and Walther Rathenau were assassinated, and the leaders were branded as "criminals" and Jews by the right-wing press dominated by Alfred Hugenberg.

Anti-Jewish sentiment was intensified by the Bavarian Soviet Republic (6 April – 3 May 1919), a communist government which briefly ruled the city of Munich before being crushed by the Freikorps. Many of the Bavarian Soviet Republic's leaders were Jewish, allowing antisemitic propagandists to connect Jews with communism, and thus treason.

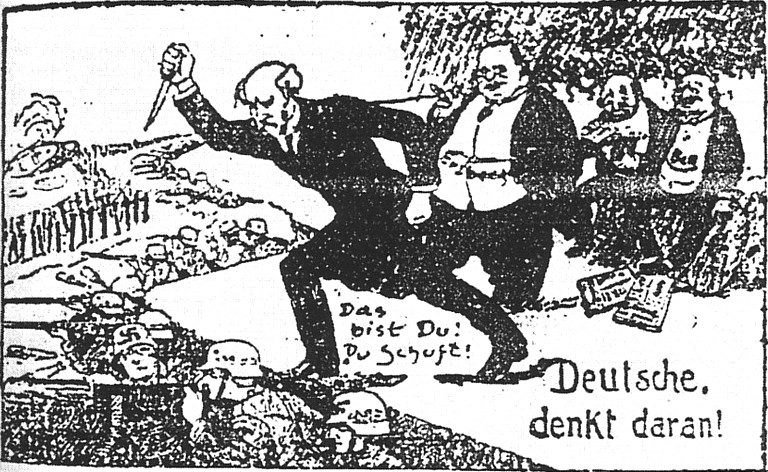
1924 right-wing German political cartoon showing Philipp Scheidemann, the German Social Democratic politician who proclaimed the Weimar Republic and was its second chancellor, and Matthias Erzberger, an anti-war politician from the Centre Party, who ended World War I by signing the armistice with the Allied Powers, as stabbing the German Army in the back

In 1919, Deutschvölkischer Schutz und Trutzbund (German Nationalist Protection and Defiance Federation) leader Alfred Roth, writing under the pseudonym "Otto Arnim", published the book The Jew in the Army which he said was based on evidence gathered during his participation on the Judenzählung, a military census which had in fact shown that German Jews had served in the front lines proportionately to their numbers. Roth's work claimed that most Jews involved in the war were only taking part as profiteers and spies, while he also blamed Jewish officers for fostering a defeatist mentality which impacted negatively on their soldiers. As such, the book offered one of the earliest published versions of the stab-in-the-back legend.

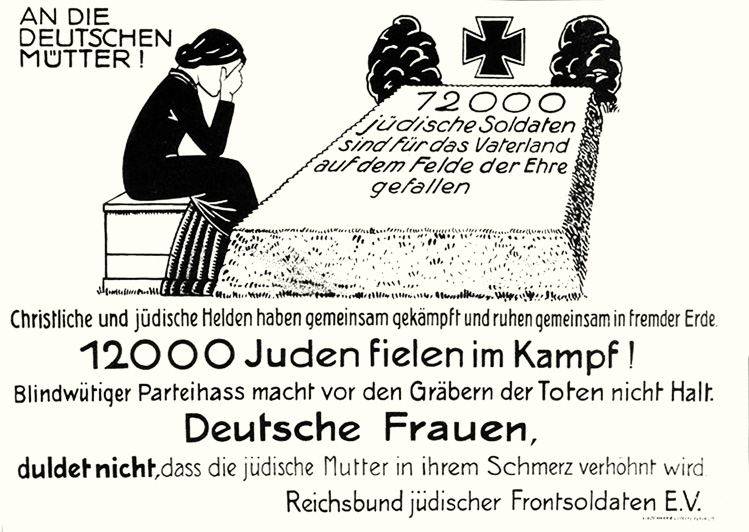
"12,000 Jewish soldiers died on the field of honor for the fatherland." A leaflet published in 1920 by German Jewish veterans in response to accusations of the lack of patriotism

A version of the stab-in-the-back myth was publicised in 1922 by the anti-Semitic Nazi theorist Alfred Rosenberg in his primary contribution to Nazi theory on Zionism, Der Staatsfeindliche Zionismus (Zionism, the Enemy of the State). Rosenberg accused German Zionists of working for a German defeat and supporting Britain and the implementation of the Balfour Declaration. (Note: This is described similarly by William Helmreich and Francis Nicosia. Helmreich noted that: "Der staatsfeindliche Zionismus, published in 1922, was Rosenberg's major contribution to the National Socialist position on Zionism. It represented in part an elaboration on ideas already expressed in articles in the Volkischer Beobachter and in other published works, notably Die Spur. The title provides the gist of a thesis that Rosenberg sought to convey to his readers: 'The Zionist organization in Germany is nothing more than an organization that pursues a legalized undermining of the German state.' He accused German Zionists of having betrayed Germany during the war by supporting Britain's Balfour Declaration and pro-Zionist policies and charged that they had actively worked for a German defeat and the Versailles settlement to obtain a Jewish National Home in Palestine. He went on to assert that the interests of Zionism were first and foremost those of world Jewry, and by implication the international Jewish conspiracy." Nicosia: "Rosenberg argues that the Jews had planned the Great War in order to secure a state in Palestine. In other words, he suggested that they generated violence and war among the gentiles in order to secure their own, exclusively Jewish, interests. In fact, the title of one of those works, Der Staatsfeindliche Zionismus ("Zionism, the Enemy of the State"), published in 1922, conveys the gist of Rosenberg's approach to the question, an approach that Hitler had been taking in some of his speeches since 1920. Rosenberg writes: 'The Zionist Organization in Germany is nothing more than an Organization that perpetrates the legal subversion of the German state.' He further accuses the Zionists of betraying Germany during World War I by supporting Great Britain and its Balfour Declaration, working for a German defeat and the implementation of the Balfour Declaration, supporting the Versailles settlement, and embracing the Jewish National Home in postwar, British-controlled Palestine.")

== Aftermath ==
The Dolchstoß was a central image in propaganda produced by the many right-wing and traditionally conservative political parties that sprang up in the early days of the Weimar Republic, including Adolf Hitler's Nazi Party. For Hitler himself, this explanatory model for World War I was of crucial personal importance. He had learned of Germany's defeat while being treated for temporary blindness following a gas attack on the front. In Mein Kampf, he described a vision at this time which drove him to enter politics. In 1923, he railed against the "November criminals" of 1918, who had stabbed the German Army in the back.

German historian Friedrich Meinecke attempted to trace the roots of the expression "stab-in-the-back" in a 11 June 1922 article in the Viennese newspaper Neue Freie Presse. In the 1924 national election, the Munich cultural journal Süddeutsche Monatshefte published a series of articles blaming the SPD and trade unions for Germany's defeat in World War I, which came out during the trial of Hitler and Ludendorff for high treason following the Beer Hall Putsch in 1923. The editor of an SPD newspaper sued the journal for defamation, giving rise to what is known as the Munich Dolchstoßprozess from 19 October to 20 November 1925. Many prominent figures testified in that trial, including members of the parliamentary committee investigating the reasons for the defeat, so some of its results were made public long before the publication of the committee report in 1928.

"And which was more certain dishonor for our people: the occupation of German areas by the enemy, or the cowardice with which our bourgeoisie surrendered the German Reich to an organization of pimps, pickpockets, deserters, black marketeers and hack journalists? Let not the gentlemen prattle now about German honor, as long as they bow under the rule of dishonor....Whoever wants to act in the name of German honor today must first launch a merciless war against the infernal defilers of German honor. They are the not the enemies of yore, but they are the representatives of the November crime. That collection of Marxist, democratic-pacifistic, destructive traitors of our country who pushed our people into its present state of powerlessness."

— Adolf Hitler, Zweites Buch, Chapter 8: "Military Power and Fallacy of Border Restoration as Goal"

=== World War II ===
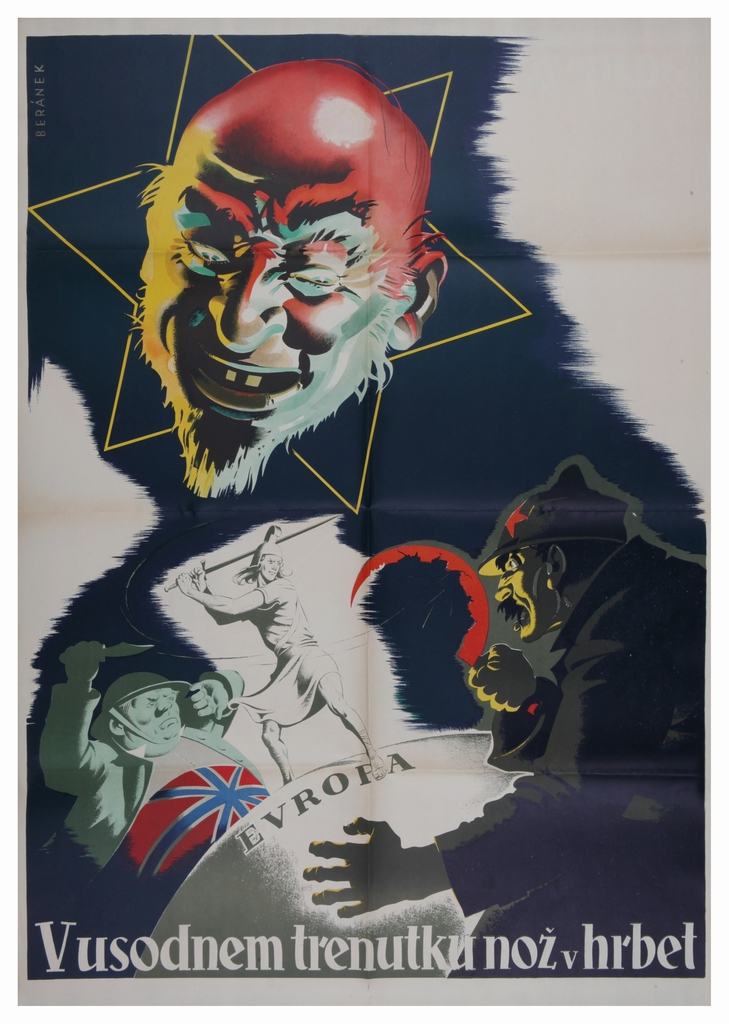
1944 poster from German-ruled Slovenia: the legend reads "A knife in the back at the fatal moment!". It depicts British Prime Minister Winston Churchill stabbing Europa in the back while Europa fights the Red Army; a stereotyped Jew watches on with glee.

The Allied policy of unconditional surrender was devised in 1943 in part to avoid a repetition of the stab-in-the-back myth. According to historian John Wheeler-Bennett, speaking from the British perspective,

It was necessary for the Nazi régime and/or the German Generals to surrender unconditionally in order to bring home to the German people that they had lost the War by themselves; so that their defeat should not be attributed to a "stab in the back".

As late as 1944, after Operation Valkyrie, Gestapo chief Heinrich Müller told Helmuth James von Moltke (Note: Other sources claims that it was to Freya von Moltke that Müller spoke.): "We won't make the same mistake as in 1918. We won't leave our internal German enemies alive."

== Wagnerian allusions ==
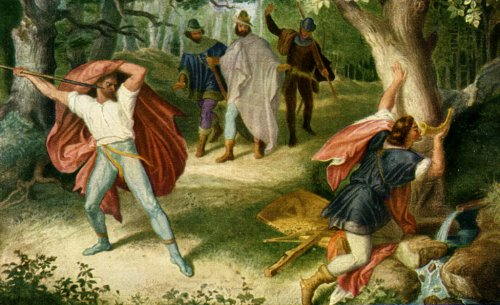
Hagen takes aim at Siegfried's back with a spear in an 1847 painting by Julius Schnorr von Carolsfeld of a scene from the epic poem Nibelungenlied ("Song of the Nibelungs") – which was the basis for Richard Wagner's opera Götterdämmerung.

To some Germans, the idea of a "stab in the back" was evocative of Richard Wagner's 1876 opera Götterdämmerung, in which Hagen murders his enemy Siegfried—the hero of the story—with a spear in his back. In Hindenburg's memoirs, he compared the collapse of the German Army to Siegfried's death.

== Psychology of belief ==
Historian Richard McMasters Hunt argues in a 1958 article that the myth was an irrational belief which commanded the force of irrefutable emotional convictions for millions of Germans. He suggests that behind these myths was a sense of communal shame, not for causing the war, but for losing it. Hunt argues that it was not the guilt of wickedness, but the shame of weakness that seized Germany's national psychology, and "served as a solvent of the Weimar democracy and also as an ideological cement of Hitler's dictatorship".

== Equivalents in other countries ==
Parallel interpretations of national trauma after military defeat appear in other countries. For example, it was applied to the United States' involvement in the Vietnam War, in the mythology of the Lost Cause of the Confederacy, and President Donald Trump's attempts to overturn the 2020 United States presidential election, particularly claims by his government and its staunchest supporters about the purported "deep state". In Turkey, the Ottoman Empire's successor state, similar narratives accusing Ottoman Christians of conspiring against the empire with the United Kingdom and Russia are promoted to justify each of the Armenian, Greek, and Assyrian genocides.

== See also ==
- Austria victim theory
- Causes of World War II
- Centre for the Study of the Causes of the War
- Genocide justification
- Jewish war conspiracy theory
- More German than the Germans, a contrasting trope about German Jewry
- Secondary antisemitism
- Spa Conferences (First World War)
- Spa Conference (29 September 1918)
