= III Wishes (song) =

Single by Terrorvision

from the album Shaving Peaches
- Released: 1999
- Length: 3:51 (album version); 3:31 (radio edit)
- Label: EMI; Total Vegas Recordings
- Songwriter(s): Terrorvision
- Producer(s): John Cornfield

Terrorvision singles chronology
| "Tequila" (1999) | "III Wishes" (1999) | "D'Ya Wanna Go Faster" (2001) |

"III Wishes" is a song by English rock band Terrorvision, which was released in 1999 as the third and final single from their fourth studio album Shaving Peaches. The song was written by Terrorvision and produced by John Cornfield. "III Wishes" reached No. 42 in the UK Singles Chart and remained in the Top 100 for two weeks.

== Background ==
"III Wishes" failed to live up to the expectations of EMI after the band's success with the UK No. 2 hit "Tequila" earlier in the year. When "III Wishes" stalled at No. 42 in the UK Singles Chart, EMI dropped the band.

According to vocalist Tony Wright, distribution and stock issues hindered the song's success. He told Metal Express Radio in 2013, "When people say 'Tequila' was a bit of luck, it wasn't. It was 15 years of hard graft and given to a numpty at the label who couldn't even get the follow-up single into the shops and we lost all that momentum because of that."

A music video was filmed to promote the single. The band also performed the song on The Pepsi Chart Show, which was broadcast on Channel 5 on 13 May 1999.

== Critical reception ==
On its release as a single, Ian Hyland of the Sunday Mirror picked "III Wishes" as one of the "singles of the week" and gave it an 8 out of 10 rating. He wrote, "Not as catchy as 'Tequila' but just as easy to remember after you've had a few. Grin and swear it." The Evening Standard wrote, "A lovely crunchy bassline, meaty, spirited, roaring, and a song which seems to be made up entirely of its chorus". They added, "Nothing like as annoyingly naff as 'Tequila', their last hit."

== Track listing ==
Cassette single

1. "III Wishes" (Radio Edit) – 3:31
2. "Tequila" (Mint Royale Shot) – 4:09
3. "Moonage Daydream" – 4:11

CD single (UK #1)

1. "III Wishes" (Radio Edit) – 3:31
2. "Tequila" (Mint Royale Shot) – 4:09
3. "If That's What It Takes" – 2:41

CD single (UK #2)

1. "III Wishes" (Radio Edit) – 3:31
2. "III Wishes" (Scuba Z Remix) – 3:37
3. "100 Things" – 2:47

CD single (UK promo #1)

1. "III Wishes" (Radio Edit) – 3:31

CD single (UK promo #2)

1. "III Wishes" (Radio Edit) – 3:31
2. "III Wishes" (Scuba Z Remix) – 3:37
3. "III Wishes" (Arthur Baker Remix) – 3:37

== Personnel ==
Credits are adapted from the UK CD1 and CD2 liner notes and the Shaving Peaches booklet.

Terrorvision

- Tony Wright – lead vocals, backing vocals
- Mark Yates – electric guitar, acoustic guitar
- Leigh Marklew – bass
- Ian "Shutty" Shuttleworth – drums, percussion

Production

- John Cornfield – producer and mixing on "III Wishes"
- Terrorvision – producers and mixing on "Moonage Daydream" and "100 Things", producers on "If That's What It Takes"
- Pat Grogan – producer and mixing on "Moonage Daydream" and "100 Things"
- Edwyn Collins – producer on "Tequila"
- Scuba Z, Arthur Baker – remixes of "III Wishes"

Other

- AP;D – design
- Rob White – photography

== Charts ==
| Chart (1999) | Peak position |
|---|---|
| Scotland (OCC) | 42 |
| UK Singles (OCC) | 42 |
