= Perseverance (song) =

1996 single by Terrorvision

- 7-inch single artwork

Single by Terrorvision

from the album Regular Urban Survivors
- B-side: "Wake Up"
- Released: 19 February 1996
- Studio: Parkgate (Battle, East Sussex, England)
- Genre: Rock
- Length: 3:11
- Label: Total Vegas; EMI
- Songwriter: Terrorvision
- Producer: Gil Norton

Terrorvision singles chronology
"Some People Say" (1995)	"Perseverance" (1996)	"Celebrity Hit List" (1996)

Audio
- "Perseverance" on YouTube

"Perseverance" is a song by English rock band Terrorvision, written by the band and produced by Gil Norton. Recorded at Parkgate Studios in Battle, England, it is the third track on their third studio album, Regular Urban Survivors (1996). The band's frontman, Tony Wright, composed the music by stitching together several guitar riffs and penned the lyric based on his personal opinions and experiences.

Released as a single through Total Vegas and EMI Records on 19 February 1996, "Perseverance" debuted and peaked at number five on the UK Singles Chart, becoming Terrorvision's highest-charting single until "Tequila" peaked at number two in 1999. Despite its success, it spent only four weeks in the UK top 100. An accompanying music video was made for the song, featuring the band performing the song in front of coloured backgrounds while wearing matching outfits; it was directed by Jeferey Levy.

== Background ==
In an interview with Songwriting magazine, Terrorvision frontman Tony Wright explained that "Perseverance" was born out of a series of instrumental riffs sewn together, unlike the band's usual process of composing the majority of a song and playing the results for one another. The song's lyric stems from the opening line: "I was high on a Molotov of cocktails"; when Wright presented this lyric to his bandmates, writing the rest of the song became easier. He also wanted to put the phrase "whales and dolphins" into the song because of his affinity toward the two animals, and he believes that line was what seized the listeners' attentions. Several other lines were reflective of Wright's life at the time. Eventually, the band went to Parkgate Studios in Battle, England, to record the song. Although it was still unfinished before the session commenced, the band and producer Gil Norton continued to build on the song, including adding the brass portions of the track.

== Release and reception ==
"Perseverance" was released as a single in the United Kingdom on 19 February 1996. Reviewing the song in their 9 March 1996 issue, Music & Media magazine commented that the song was "catchy" and referred to the "grungy" guitars as "infectious". On the week beginning 25 February 1996, the song debuted at its peak of number five on the UK Singles Chart, becoming Terrorvision's seventh top-40 hit, first top-five single, and highest-charting song until 1999, when "Tequila" peaked at number two. The following week, it dropped to number 21, then left the top 100 two weeks later. On the Scottish Singles Chart, the track peaked at number nine. It appeared on the Eurochart Hot 100 for three issues, debuting at number 38 on 9 March, rising to its peak of number 29 the following week, then plummeting to number 100 on 23 March.

== Track listings ==
UK limited-edition 7-inch blue vinyl single

A. "Perseverance"
B. "Wake Up" (produced by Roy Spong)

UK CD1

1. "Perseverance"
2. "Wake Up" (produced by Roy Spong)
3. "What Goes Around Comes Around"

UK CD2

1. "Perseverance"
2. "Sick and Tired"
3. "Hard to Feel" (produced by Roy Spong)

== Personnel ==
Personnel are adapted from the UK CD1 liner notes and the Regular Urban Survivors booklet.

Terrorvision

- Terrorvision – writing, screenplay, soundtrack
- Tony Wright – vocals
- Ian "Shutty" Shuttleworth – drums
- Mark Yates – guitars
- Leigh Marklew – bass

Other personnel

- Gil Norton – production
- Roy Spong – production ("Wake Up", "Hard to Feel")
- Dave Roberton – coordination
- Abrahams Pants – art direction
- Tweddell – brushes

== Charts ==
Chart (1996)	Peak position
Australia (ARIA)	144
Europe (Eurochart Hot 100)	29
Scotland Singles (OCC)	9
UK Singles (OCC)	5
