= Must Be Destroyed =

...Must Be Destroyed may refer to:

- America Must Be Destroyed, 1992 album by GWAR
- Britrock Must Be Destroyed, 2018 UK rock concert tour
- Frankenstein Must Be Destroyed, 1969 British horror film
- The Wildhearts Must Be Destroyed, 2003 album by The Wildhearts
