= Josephine (Terrorvision song) =

Single by Terrorvision

from the album Shaving Peaches
- Released: 1998
- Length: 3:13
- Label: EMI; Total Vegas Recordings
- Songwriter(s): Terrorvision
- Producer(s): Edwyn Collins

Terrorvision singles chronology
"Easy" (1996)	"Josephine" (1998)	"Tequila" (1999)

"Josephine" is a song by English rock band Terrorvision, which was released in 1998 as the lead single from their fourth studio album Shaving Peaches. The song was written by Terrorvision and produced by Edwyn Collins. "Josephine" reached No. 23 in the UK Singles Chart and remained in the Top 100 for two weeks. The song's music video was directed by Tomas Masin.

== Background ==
"Josephine" has lyrics where the male protagonist has a friend, Joe, who returns as Josephine after having a sex change, and a relationship develops ("Although I lost old Joe/I got a new girlfriend"). In a 2000 interview with Roofdog, Yates said of the song, "We all know a Josephine, but we don't know it. Think of a bloke you really respect and he probably dresses as a woman some of the time!"

"Josephine" was one of four tracks Terrorvision recorded for Shaving Peaches with Edwyn Collins as the producer. A beer can was used during the recording of the track to produce the sound after the line "It took a while to click". The sound took twenty-four takes to record.

== Release ==
Preceding the release of Shaving Peaches, "Josephine" was issued as the album's first single in September 1998. It was the band's first new release in over 18 months. The track "Go Jerry", which appeared as one of the extra tracks on some editions of the single, was written and recorded as a tribute to Jerry Springer.

== Critical reception ==
On its release as a single, Select wrote that "Josephine" "recounts the tale of finding a gender-swapping friend in jocular style". The reviewer noted the "bounce-worthy chorus" and the "main intrigue [of] non-metaller Edwyn Collins producing". Clare Wigmore of the Reading Weekend Post described the song as "a heart-warming, optimistic tale of transsexual love" which is "swamped in dirty rockabilly guitar". In a review of Shaving Peaches, Jason Damas of AllMusic noted the song's "raucous twang".

== Track listing ==
7-inch single (limited edition)

1. "Josephine" – 3:13
2. "Reasons to Deceive" – 3:49

CD single (UK #1)

1. "Josephine" – 3:13
2. "Reasons to Deceive" – 3:49
3. "Go Jerry" – 2:46

CD single (UK #2)

1. "Josephine" – 3:13
2. "Falling Down" – 1:50
3. "28 Hours" – 2:55

CD single (European release)

1. "Josephine" – 3:13
2. "Reasons to Deceive" – 3:49
3. "Go Jerry" – 2:46
4. "Falling Down" – 1:50

== Personnel ==
Credits are adapted from the UK CD1 and CD2 liner notes and the Shaving Peaches booklet.

Terrorvision

- Tony Wright – lead vocals, backing vocals, beer can
- Mark Yates – electric guitar
- Leigh Marklew – bass
- Ian "Shutty" Shuttleworth – drums

Additional musicians

- Edwyn Collins – keyboards, Moog synthesizer

Production

- Edwyn Collins – producer on "Josephine"
- John Cornfield – mixing on "Josephine" and "Reasons to Deceive", producer on "Reasons to Deceive"
- Pat Grogan – producer and mixing on "Go Jerry" and "28 Hours"
- Terrorvision – producers and mixing on "Falling Down"
- Martin Granville-Twig – mastering

Other

- Microdot – sleeve
- Brian Cannon – art direction
- Matthew Sankey – design
- James Burns – photography

== Charts ==
Chart (1998)	Peak position
Europe (Eurochart Hot 100)	86
Scotland (OCC)	24
UK Singles (OCC)	23
