= Good to Go =

Good to Go may refer to:

== Film and TV ==
- Good to Go (film), a 1986 film directed by Blaine Novak and starring Art Garfunkel and Robert DoQui
- Good to Go (Srečen za umret), 2012 film with Evgen Car

== Music ==
- Good to Go (7 Seconds album), a 1999 album by 7 Seconds
- Good to Go (Terrorvision album), a 2001 album by Terrorvision
- Good to Go (soundtrack), a soundtrack album to the film Good to Go
- Good to Go, an EP by Jimmy Eat World
- "Good to Go", a song by Elliott Smith from his 1995 album Elliott Smith
- "Good to Go", a track from the 1995 Steve Morse Band album Structural Damage
- "Good to Go", a track by Hammer from his 1991 album Too Legit to Quit

== Other ==
- Good to Go (toll collection system), the toll collection system used by the Washington State Department of Transportation

== See also ==
- Good to Go-Go, album by Spyro Gyra
