= Kriegsamt =

German military authority founded in 1916 during the First World War

The Kriegsamt or German (Supreme) War Office was a central military authority in the German Empire founded in 1916 during the First World War. The Kingdom of Bavaria had its own war office.

== Tasks and structures ==
The War Office was officially founded on November 1, 1916, in connection with the Hindenburg Programme of the Supreme Army Command. Overall, it served to centralize the war economy and was responsible for all areas of economic mobilization, but also for the organization of work and service obligations. According to Wilhelm II's cabinet order, the task was to "manage all matters related to the overall warfare of the procurement, use and nutrition of the workers, as well as the procurement of raw materials, weapons and ammunition."

The office was intended primarily as an authority for the implementation of the patriotic Auxiliary Services Act. It was responsible not only for managing raw materials, but also for subsidizing the defense industry and controlling investments. This went so far that it was able to order the shutdown of companies that were not important to the war effort.

The collections of raw materials and waste materials were also coordinated via the Department of Public Nutrition (Abteilung für Volksernährungsfragen).
