= Middleman (song) =

Single by Terrorvision

from the album How to Make Friends and Influence People
- Released: 13 June 1994
- Length: 3:32
- Label: EMI; Total Vegas Recordings
- Songwriter(s): Terrorvision
- Producer(s): Gil Norton

Terrorvision singles chronology
"Oblivion" (1994)	"Middleman" (1994)	"Pretend Best Friend" (1994)

"Middleman" is a song by English rock band Terrorvision, which was released in June 1994 as the second single from their second studio album How to Make Friends and Influence People. The song was written by Terrorvision and produced by Gil Norton. "Middleman" reached No. 25 in the UK Singles Chart and remained in the Top 100 for five weeks. The song's music video was directed by Tim Royes and produced by Alan Wachs.

== Critical reception ==
On its release as a single, Alan Jones of Music Week chose "Middleman" as the "pick of the week". He considered the song to be a "tuneful rock record", which he felt showed the band moving "closer to the mainstream". He noted the song as being "tastefully decorated by strings" and added, "It is not so very far removed from the style of ELO in the Seventies, with some of Jeff Lynne's vocal devices also coming into play." Jennifer Nine of Melody Maker picked it as one of the magazine's "singles of the week" and commented, "'Middleman' boasts Gil Norton's sure use of tension and space, with upfront naked vocals suddenly ambushed by guitars. It's also got some unabashedly Beatle-y chord progressions, ruggedly supple rock vocals, hooks for days and strings 'n' choruses. The concluding 'doo-doo, doo-doo' bit is pure gold."

Music & Media felt the song "could have been a Troggs tune". They added, "Streetwise as these lads are, they don't turn down their amplifiers. Brilliant!" David Quantick of NME remarked, "Chunka grumble! Terrorvision sound like they're from that town in America but they're from Bradford or nearby, and 'Middleman' has a riff that swings like a can of cold beans."

== Track listing ==
12-inch single (limited edition)

1. "Middleman" – 3:32
2. "Surrender" – 4:24
3. "The Passenger" – 4:57

Cassette single (UK)

1. "Middleman" – 3:32
2. "Oblivion" – 3:03

CD single (UK #1)

1. "Middleman" – 3:32
2. "I'll Be Your Sister" – 2:33
3. "Wishing Well" – 2:29

CD single (UK #2)

1. "Middleman" – 3:32
2. "The Passenger" – 4:57
3. "Surrender" – 4:24

CD single (UK promo)

1. "Middleman" (Radio Edit) – 3:35

CD single (European release)

1. "Middleman" – 3:32
2. "The Passenger" – 4:57

== Personnel ==
Credits are adapted from the UK CD1 and CD2 liner notes and the How to Make Friends and Influence People booklet.

Terrorvision

- Tony Wright – vocals
- Mark Yates – guitar
- Leigh Marklew – bass
- Ian "Shutty" Shuttleworth – drums

Additional musicians

- Audrey Riley – string arrangement and backing vocals on "Middleman"
- Billy McGhee – string arrangement on "Middleman"

Production

- Gil Norton – producer and mixing on "Middleman"
- Al Clay – engineer on "Middleman"
- Mike Cyr – assistant engineer on "Middleman"
- Chris Sheldon – mixing on "Middleman"
- Terrorvision – producers on "I'll Be Your Sister", "Wishing Well", "Surrender" and "The Passenger"

== Charts ==
Chart (1994)	Peak position
Europe (Eurochart Hot 100)	85
Scotland (OCC)	44
UK Singles (OCC)	25
