= Regular Urban Survivors =

Studio album by Terrorvision
- Released: 11 March 1996
- Studio: Parkgate, Eden
- Genre: hard rock
- Length: 42:17
- Label: Total Vegas
- Producer: Gil Norton

Terrorvision chronology
How to Make Friends and Influence People (1994)	Regular Urban Survivors (1996)	Shaving Peaches (1998)

Professional ratings
Review scores
Source	Rating
AllMusic	4.5/5 stars
Smash Hits	5/5 stars

Regular Urban Survivors is the third album by British rock band Terrorvision. "Perseverance", "Easy", "Bad Actress" and "Celebrity Hit List" were each released as singles. "Perseverance" and "Celebrity Hit List" were both regular Match of the Day 'goal of the week' regulars. The album featured movie-themed artwork, which depicted the band members as part of a James Bond/Mission: Impossible-style elite fighting force.

To mark the 20th anniversary of the album's release, the band performed Regular Urban Survivors in full during their 2016 UK tour.

== Production ==
Regular Urban Survivors was recorded at Parkgate Studios and Eden Studios, with producer Gil Norton; he and Roy Spong acted as engineers, with assistance from Doug Cook (at Parkgate) and Simon Wall (at Eden). Norton and Spong mixed the album at Abbey Road Studios, with assistance from Robbie Kazandjian.

== Track listing ==
All songs by Terrorvision.

1. "Enteralterego" – 3:21
2. "Superchronic" – 2:50
3. "Perseverance" – 3:11
4. "Easy" – 3:10
5. "Hide the Dead Girl" – 3:03
6. "Conspiracy" – 3:15
7. "Didn't Bleed Red" – 4:10
8. "Dog Chewed the Handle" – 2:50
9. "Junior" – 3:29
10. "Bad Actress" – 4:12
11. "If I Was You" – 2:02
12. "Celebrity Hit List" – 3:05
13. "Mugwump" – 3:39

== Personnel ==
Personnel per booklet.

Terrorvision

- Tony Wright – vocals
- Shutty – drums
- Mark Yates – guitars
- Leigh Marklew – bass

Additional musicians

- Mark Phythian – programmer
- Audrey Riley – string arranger (track 10)
- Enrico Tomasso – horns (tracks 3, 4 and 13), flugelhorn (tracks 1 and 9)
- Jay Craig – horns (tracks 3, 4 and 13)
- Pete Long – horns (tracks 3, 4 and 13)
- Mark Feltham – harmonica (tracks 1 and 7)
- Bruce Woolley – theremin (tracks 7 and 8)
- Sharon Eusebe – backing vocals (track 9)
- Rachel Corkett – backing vocals (track 9)
- Garrington Plodovich – grooves (track 6)

Production

- Gil Norton – producer, mixing
- Roy Spong – engineer, mixing
- Doug Cook – assistant engineer
- Simon Wall – assistant engineer
- Robbie Kazandjian – assistant engineer

Design

- Abrahams Pants – art direction, design
- Terrorvision – art direction, design
- Tweddell – scenic artist
- Martyn James Brooks – photography
- Jeremy Ranson – location manager
- Spymaster – guns, gadgets

== Certifications ==
Region	Certification	Certified units/sales
United Kingdom (BPI)	Gold	100,000^{^}
^{^} Shipments figures based on certification alone.
