= Formaldehyde (album) =

Studio album by Terrorvision
- Released: 3 May 1993
- Recorded: June 1992
- Studio: The Chapel
- Genres: Alternative rock, hard rock
- Length: 45:48
- Label: EMI
- Producers: Pat Grogan, Terrorvision

Terrorvision chronology
Formaldehyde (1993)	How to Make Friends and Influence People (1994)

Professional ratings
Review scores
Source	Rating
AllMusic	1.5/5 stars
The Encyclopedia of Popular Music	3/5 stars

Formaldehyde is the first album by the rock band Terrorvision. Produced by Pat Grogan and the band, the album was recorded at The Chapel in June 1992. They were assisted by Fulton Dingley; Grogan and the band mixed all of the recordings, except for "New Policy One", "My House", and "Human Being", which were mixed by Gil Norton. All songs written and arranged by Terrorvision. The original Total Vegas Recordings version was released in December 1992; the EMI version appeared on 3 May 1993.

== Track listing ==
All songs written by Terrorvision.

1. "Problem Solved" – 3:41
2. "Ships That Sink" – 3:27
3. "American TV" – 4:32
4. "New Policy One" – 3:29
5. "Jason" – 4:02
6. "Killing Time" – 3:22
7. "Urban Space Crime" – 3:44
8. "Hole for a Soul" – 4:01
9. "Don't Shoot My Dog" – 5:27
10. "Desolation Town" – 2:56
11. "My House" – 3:06
12. "Human Being" – 4:00

== Alternate track listing ==
Prior to the EMI version of this album, the band released a version on their own Total Vegas label. Only 1000 CD copies and 500 vinyl copies were produced. It included two extra tracks that were not present on the later EMI release.

1. Problem Solved – 3:41
2. Ships That Sink – 3:27
3. American TV – 4:33
4. New Policy One – 3:29
5. Jason – 4:02
6. Killing Time – 3:22
7. Urban Space Crime – 3:44
8. Hole for a Soul – 4:01
9. Don't Shoot My Dog – 5:27
10. Desolation Town – 2:56
11. My House – 3:06
12. Human Being – 3:57
13. Pain Reliever – 2:44
14. Tea Dance – 2:05

== Personnel ==
Personnel per booklet.

Terrorvision

- Tony Wright – vocals
- Shutty – drums
- Mark Yates – guitars
- Leigh Marklew – bass

Additional musicians

- Gavin Wright – violin (tracks 6 and 8)
- Nick Roberts – harmonica (track 10)

Production and design

- Pat Grogan – producer, engineer, mixing
- Terrorvision – producer, mixing
- Fulton Dingley – assistant
- Gil Norton – mixing (tracks 4, 11 and 12)

== Expanded Edition ==
In 2013, an expanded 2 CD edition was released by Cherry Red Records. Disc one retains the original EMI track listing. Disc two includes the two additional tracks from the original Total Vegas release, plus subsequent b-sides from Terrorvision single releases, and live tracks.

1. Blackbird
2. Pain Reliever
3. Coming Up
4. Tea Dance
5. Corpse Fly
6. Sailing Home
7. Don't Shoot My Dog Again
8. Psycho Killer
9. Pain Reliever (Live at Don Valley Stadium, Sheffield, 6 June 1993)
10. Ships That Sink (Live at Don Valley Stadium, Sheffield, 6 June 1993)
11. Problem Solved (Live at Don Valley Stadium, Sheffield, 6 June 1993)
12. American TV (Live at Don Valley Stadium, Sheffield, 6 June 1993)
13. New Policy One (Live at Don Valley Stadium, Sheffield, 6 June 1993)
14. Still the Rhythm (Live at Don Valley Stadium, Sheffield, 6 June 1993)
15. Psycho Killer (Live at Don Valley Stadium, Sheffield, 6 June 1993)
16. Tea Dance (Live at Don Valley Stadium, Sheffield, 6 June 1993)
17. My House (Live at Don Valley Stadium, Sheffield, 6 June 1993)
18. My House (Machete Mix)
19. Psycho Killer (Extended Mix)
20. My House (Attic Mix)
