= How to Make Friends and Influence People =

Studio album by Terrorvision
- Released: 18 April 1994
- Genre: hard rock
- Length: 54:50
- Label: Total Vegas
- Producer: Gil Norton

Terrorvision chronology
Formaldehyde (1993)	How to Make Friends and Influence People (1994)	Regular Urban Survivors (1996)

Singles from How to Make Friends and Influence People
- 1. "Oblivion" Released: 28 March 1994; 2. "Middleman" Released: 13 June 1994; 3. "Pretend Best Friend" Released: 23 August 1994; 4. "Alice What's the Matter" Released: 17 October 1994; 5. "Some People Say" Released: 6 March 1995

Professional ratings
Review scores
Source	Rating
AllMusic	4/5 stars
Music Week	3/5 stars
NME	7/10

How to Make Friends and Influence People is the second album by the rock band Terrorvision, released in 1994 on Total Vegas Recordings. "Oblivion", "Middleman", "Pretend Best Friend", "Alice What's the Matter", and "Some People Say" were all released as singles. The title refers to the Dale Carnegie book How to Win Friends and Influence People. The album was recorded in 17 days.

== Production ==
How to Make Friends and Influence People was recorded with producer Gil Norton and engineer Al Clay; they were assisted by engineer Mike Cyr. Norton and Chris Sheldon mixed the album at The Church in London, with assistance from Elliot Ness and John McDonnell.

== Anniversary tours ==
The 15th anniversary of the release of the album was commemorated by tours in April and December 2009, whereby the band played the entire album from start to finish; the first time the album has been played live in its entirety. During the first leg of the tour, at the larger venues a recording of the show was available for purchase immediately afterwards.

The album was played in full again in May 2019 during a short UK tour to commemorate its 25th anniversary.

== Track listing ==
All tracks written by Terrorvision.

1. "Alice What's the Matter" – 2:43
2. "Oblivion" – 3:03
3. "Stop the Bus" – 3:43
4. "Discotheque Wreck" – 3:17
5. "Middleman" – 3:32
6. "Still the Rhythm" – 3:32
7. "Ten Shades of Grey" – 3:03
8. "Stab in the Back" – 4:51
9. "Pretend Best Friend" – 3:47
10. "Time O the Signs" – 3:25
11. "What the Doctor Ordered" – 2:17
12. "Some People Say" – 3:03
13. "What Makes You Tick" (includes hidden track) – 14:34

The hidden track is a very low quality collection of sounds recorded by the band in New York, where the album was recorded.

== Personnel ==
Personnel per booklet.

Terrorvision

- Tony Wright – vocals
- Shutty – drums
- Mark Yates – guitars
- Leigh Marklew – bass

Additional musicians

- Mark Phythian – programmer
- Audrey Riley – string arranger, backing vocals (track 5)
- Billy McGhee – string arranger
- Anita Madigan – backing vocals (tracks 2, 4 and 13)
- Enrico Tomasso – flugelhorn (track 9)
- Spry Galliano – percussion (track 8)

Production and design

- Gil Norton – producer, mixing
- Al Clay – engineer
- Mike Cyr – assistant engineer
- Chris Sheldon – mixing
- Elliot Ness – assistant
- John McDonnell – assistant
- Terrorvision – design
- Union Design – design
- Bob Gruen – photography

== Certifications ==
Region	Certification	Certified units/sales
United Kingdom (BPI)	Gold	100,000^{^}
^{^} Shipments figures based on certification alone.
