= Shaving Peaches =

Studio album by Terrorvision
- Released: 3 November 1998
- Genre: Britpop; alternative rock; indie rock
- Length: 61:40
- Label: EMI, Total Vegas
- Producer: Edwyn Collins; Jez Willis; John Cornfield; Tim Garbutt

Terrorvision chronology
Regular Urban Survivors (1996)	Shaving Peaches (1998)	Good to Go (2001)

Professional ratings
Review scores
Source	Rating
Allmusic	4/5 stars

Shaving Peaches is the fourth album by Terrorvision. Released in 1998 as the follow-up to Regular Urban Survivors, it found the band heading in a more chart-orientated pop direction with co-production from Edwyn Collins. Here, the band push their sound further than before, veering away from metal towards a soft rock sound that uses actual electronic beats. Tracks such as "Day After Day" and "When I Die" retain the melancholy that featured on earlier albums, whilst the rest of the album follows the template of the positive and upbeat single, "Tequila".

== Track listing ==
1. "III Wishes" – 3:51
2. "Josephine" – 3:11
3. "Hypnotised" – 3:49
4. "Can't Get You Out of My Mind" – 3:05
5. "In Your Shoes" – 4:21
6. "Swings and Roundabouts" – 3:25
7. "Day After Day" – 3:35
8. "Left to the Right" – 3:59
9. "Cantankerous" – 4:15
10. "Tequila" – 3:52
11. "Vegas" – 3:52
12. "Babyface" – 4:11
13. "Spanner in the Works" – 4:15
14. "When I Die" – 4:06
15. "On a Mission" – 3:40
16. "Tricycles on Ice" – Hidden track – only on the first edition
17. "Tequila (Mint Royale Shot)" – 4:09 (Added to reissues of the album)
