= Tequila (Terrorvision song) =

1999 single by Terrorvision

Single by Terrorvision

from the album Shaving Peaches
- B-side: "Risk Worth Taking"
- Released: 18 January 1999
- Length: 3:52 (album version); 4:11 (Mint Royale shot)
- Label: EMI; Total Vegas
- Songwriters: Terrorvision; Chuck Rio
- Producer: Edwyn Collins

Terrorvision singles chronology
"Josephine" (1998)	"Tequila" (1999)	"III Wishes" (1999)

Audio
- "Tequila" (album version) on YouTube; "Tequila" (Mint Royale shot) on YouTube

"Tequila" is a song by English rock band Terrorvision, written by the band and Chuck Rio and produced by Scottish musician Edwyn Collins. The song originally appeared on the band's fourth studio album, Shaving Peaches (1998), and was released as the album's second single on 18 January 1999. For the single release, English music producer Mint Royale remixed the track. These remixes were heavily championed by BBC Radio 1 DJ Zoe Ball, allowing the song to reach number two on the UK Singles Chart, becoming Terrorvision's highest-charting song in the UK. In 1999, the song won the Kerrang! Award for Best Single.

== Release ==
For its release as a single, Mint Royale remixed "Tequila", creating three mixes known as the "Mint Royale shot", "Mint Royale chaser", and "Mint Royale slammer" versions. "Risk Worth Taking" was also included as a B-side on the second UK CD. The song was originally scheduled to be released a week earlier than planned, but during a meeting with Terrorvision's record label, EMI Records, management convinced the band to delay the release for a week. According to lead vocalist Tony Wright:

We were going to release Tequila the week before we did. But we went to the meeting with the record label, and Geri's management were really good. They told us we couldn't do it that week. They said it was too strong, that Geri wanted to talk her way through another cover version and it had to get to number one. Our management didn't have the same clout, so we released a week later. We sold something like 60,000 copies more than Geri did – but we only got to number two.

Although Wright stated that Geri Halliwell's debut release was the reason they had delayed the release of "Tequila", Halliwell's first solo single was not scheduled for release until 10 May 1999. The single that was at number one the week before "Tequila" charted, "A Little Bit More", was a cover version by English boyband 911, not Halliwell.

Shortly before EMI Records released "Tequila", they discussed dropping Terrorvision from the label. However, the Mint Royale mixes of the song soon earned heavy support from Zoe Ball, who at the time hosted BBC Radio 1's Breakfast show. Public demand eventually led to the single's release on 18 January 1999.

== Critical reception ==
British columnist James Masterton wrote that the original version of the song was not a standout on the album but called the Mint Royale version "the most sublime party track you have heard since, well, Brimful of Asha". At the 1999 Kerrang! Awards, the song won the Award for Best Single. In 2011, Tequila-based website TasteTequila ranked the song at number three on their list of the "13 Obscure (Yet Awesome) Songs About Tequila". Conversely, Caroline Sullivan of The Guardian wrote that the song was a "fluke", going on to say that the only thing that distinguishes the song from anonymity is the refrain, comparing "Tequila" as a whole to a cover version of Five's "Keep On Movin'".

== Chart performance ==
On the week starting 24 January 1999, "Tequila" debuted at number two on the UK Singles Chart, behind the Offspring's "Pretty Fly (for a White Guy)", with sales of 58,000 copies. Regarding this result, Wright said that he did not mind that Terrorvision did not top the chart, explaining that he was happy there were two rock bands occupying the top two positions. By reaching number two, "Tequila" became Terrorvision's highest-charting single in their home country as well as their longest-charting, staying in the top 100 for 13 weeks, twice as long as their second-longest-charting song, "Oblivion" (1994). In 2013, the single was certified silver by the British Phonographic Industry (BPI) for shipping over 200,000 copies in the UK.

Outside the UK, "Tequila" became Terrorvision's only top-30 hit on the Irish Singles Chart, peaking at number 20 and spending four weeks in the top 30. The song also reached the top 30 in Iceland, where it peaked at number 23 in May 1999. Elsewhere in Europe, the song charted only in the Netherlands, reaching number 83 on the Single Top 100 ranking. On the Eurochart Hot 100, the single debuted and peaked at number 13 on the issue dated 6 February 1999. In New Zealand, "Tequila" became Terrorvision's only song to chart, debuting at its peak of number 13 on 28 March 1999 and spending seven weeks in the top 50. Despite the song's success, Terrorvision would soon be dropped by EMI Records.

== Track listings ==
UK CD1 and 12-inch single

1. "Tequila" (Mint Royale chaser)
2. "Tequila" (album version)
3. "Tequila" (Mint Royale slammer)

UK CD2

1. "Tequila" (Mint Royale shot)
2. "Tequila" (album version)
3. "Risk Worth Taking"

European CD single

1. "Tequila" (Mint Royale shot)
2. "Tequila" (album version)

== Personnel ==
Personnel are lifted from the Shaving Peaches album booklet and the UK CD1 liner notes.

- Terrorvision – writing
  - Tony Wright – lead vocals, backing vocals
  - Mark Yates – electric guitar, Spanish guitar
  - Leigh Marklew – bass
  - Ian "Shutty" Shuttleworth – drums
- Charlotte Banadout – backing vocals
- Grace Maxwell – backing vocals
- Kassie Landau – backing vocals
- Melissa Mantigi – backing vocals
- Monique Kyriacou – backing vocals
- Naomi Stoll – backing vocals
- Jeff Scantlebury – percussion
- Dick Cuthell – trumpet
- Edwyn Collins – production
- John Cornfield – mixing
- Mint Royale – remixing
- AP.D – artwork design
- Spencer Rowell – photography

== Charts ==
=== Weekly charts ===
Chart (1999)	Peak position
Europe (Eurochart Hot 100)	13
Iceland (Íslenski Listinn Topp 40)	23
Ireland (IRMA)	20
Netherlands (Single Top 100)	83
New Zealand (Recorded Music NZ)	13
Scottish Singles Sales (Official Charts)	3
UK Singles (Official Charts)	2

=== Year-end charts ===
Chart (1999)	Position
UK Singles (OCC)	105

== Certifications ==
Region	Certification	Certified units/sales
United Kingdom (BPI)	Silver	200,000^{^}
^{^} Shipments figures based on certification alone.
