= Terrorvision =

British rock band

- Also known as: The Spoilt Bratz
- Origin: Keighley, West Yorkshire, England
- Genres: Hard rock; alternative rock
- Years active: 1987–2001; 2005; 2007–present
- Labels: EMI; Papillon Records; Total Vegas Recordings
- Members: Tony Wright; Mark Yates; Leigh Marklew; Milton "Milly" Evans; Chris Bussey
- Past members: Ian "Shutty" Shuttleworth; Cameron Greenwood; Chris Catalyst
- Website: Official website (archived)

Terrorvision are an English rock band. They were formed in 1987 (as The Spoilt Bratz) in Keighley, West Yorkshire, and initially disbanded in 2001. The band used Bradford as a base after the name change to Terrorvision in 1991, by which time the band members had all moved there.

== History ==
The re-release of their second single, "My House" (from the album Formaldehyde), in January 1994 proved to be Terrorvision's breakthrough to UK Singles Chart success, and preceded by months the release of their second album How to Make Friends and Influence People in April 1994. The leading single from that album, "Oblivion", was also a chart success. All subsequent singles achieved Top 40 entries in the UK, culminating in the release of "Tequila", which reached number 2. The band won the Kerrang! Award for Best Newcomer in 1994.

A video compilation, Fired Up and Lairy, was released in April 1995 and included spoof documentary segments interspersed with all the band's videos to date. A third album, Regular Urban Survivors, followed in March 1996 and spawned four singles: "Perseverance" (their first Top 5 single, peaking at number 5), "Celebrity Hit List," "Bad Actress" and "Easy". Lead singer Tony Wright presented the BBC TV music show Top of the Pops on one occasion, and made several appearances on the comedy music quiz Never Mind the Buzzcocks.

The band's fourth album, Shaving Peaches, appeared in October 1998. The album's first single, "Josephine," had been well-received the previous month, but it was a Mint Royale remix of "Tequila" which was to prove to be their biggest-ever hit, reaching number 2 in the UK chart in January 1999. That year, the song was awarded Best Single at the Kerrang! Awards.

The choice was a controversial one among fans. The band originally put a selection of their potential single releases to members of their official fan club, who voted in favour of "Day After Day." However, the remixed version of "Tequila" gained favour with BBC Radio 1 DJ Zoë Ball, who championed its release as a single. Plans to release "Day After Day" were hastily shelved, and a video was quickly shot for the "Tequila" release. A few promo copies of the "Day After Day" single still exist.

They were dropped by their record label, EMI, after the release of the album's third single, "III Wishes." It was the band's first single to fall outside the UK Top 40 since the release of "My House," six years earlier. During this time the band recruited a fifth member, Josephine Ellul, who played keyboards and sang backing vocals at concerts.

The band signed to a smaller label, Papillon, and put out a fifth studio album, Good to Go, in 2001. The record, like all their others, was also credited to Total Vegas, the band's own independent imprint. A number of singles followed, but the band was unable to replicate their previous success. Their final single, "Fists of Fury," gained some notoriety for its video, which aped the cowboy-themed clip accompanying Madonna's single, "Don't Tell Me."

EMI issued Whales and Dolphins, a greatest-hits collection in 2001, and the band decided to call it a day, after a farewell tour. The 'final' concert took place at Penningtons nightclub in their hometown of Bradford, on 4 October 2001, and was released with an interview DVD as a live album, Take the Money & Run - The Final Concert.

=== Reunion ===
The group reformed to play two tours in 2005, and played what was described as their 'last ever show' at Rock in the Castle in Scarborough, Yorkshire, on 17 September 2005, as Special Guests of The Wildhearts. A collection of b-sides and rarities was also issued by EMI in September 2005.

On 13 January 2011, singer Tony Wright announced on Facebook that they would be releasing a new album in 2011, and would be going on a UK tour to support it. The tour was to start in Newcastle on 24 February. The new album, Super Delux, was duly released on 24 February 2011.

Terrorvision returned again in 2016 for a five date arena tour of the UK supporting UK rockers Thunder. Bassist Leigh Marklew said, "We were discussing the idea of getting back in the ring in 2016 – when the call came from Thunder the timing was perfect. We agreed it would be a great way to come back."

In November 2017, a triple-headline tour, called "Britrock Must Be Destroyed", was announced with Reef and The Wildhearts. The tour was eight dates across the UK in May 2018, and featured full sets from each band, with a different running order each night. In February 2018, UK Britpop band Dodgy were announced as the opening act for all eight dates. In March 2018, the tour was extended to five dates, across August and September, in Australia.

A 25th anniversary tour celebrating How to Make Friends and Influence People was announced by the band in a video-post on Facebook in November 2018, with dates at London's Islington Assembly Hall, SWX Bristol, Rock City Nottingham, and the O2 Ritz in Manchester in May 2019, with support from The Amorettes. In December 2019, the group released their first new single for seven years, "Our Christmas Song". The band announced their new album, titled We Are Not Robots would be released on 20 September 2024. A UK tour followed in March 2025 with a triumphant return to the stage, with a sold out show at the Corporation, Sheffield.

== Side projects ==
After splitting up, singer Tony Wright formed Laika Dog as well as working as a dry stone waller. He has also released two solo albums and an album recorded with Ryan Hamilton.

Guitarist Mark Yates joined firstly the short-lived Boston Crabs and then formed Blunderbuss, releasing one album to date, "Relentless," and then formed another new band, Badwolf; whilst Leigh Marklew formed Malibu Stacey, who released one album, "On Heat," before splitting up. Mark Yates now plays guitar in rock band Boomville alongside Ben Moran, former bass player with Leeds Band Little Black Hearts.

== Band members ==
Current members

- Tony Wright – lead vocals, guitar (1987–2001, 2005, 2007–present)
- Mark Yates – guitars (1987–2001, 2005, 2007–present)
- Leigh Marklew – bass (1987–2001, 2005, 2007–present)
- Chris Bussey – drums (2023–present)
- Milton "Milly" Evans – keyboards, trumpet, backing vocals (2005, 2007–present)

Former members

- David Ian "Shutty" Shuttleworth – drums (1987–2001, 2005, 2007–2010)
- Cameron Greenwood – drums (2010–2023)

Former session member

- Danny Lambert – bass, backing vocals (2007)

Touring members

- Josephine Ellul – keyboards (1998–2001)
- Chris Catalyst – keyboards (2016, 2020)
- Nick Hughes – trumpet (2016–present)
- Liz Mitchell – saxophone (2017–present)

== Discography ==
=== Studio albums ===
| Year | Release date | Record label | UK Albums Chart | AUS |
|---|---|---|---|---|
| 3 May 1993 | Formaldehyde | Total Vegas / EMI | 75 | |
| 18 Apr 1994 | How to Make Friends and Influence People | Total Vegas / EMI | 18 | 158 |
| 11 Mar 1996 | Regular Urban Survivors | Total Vegas / EMI | 8 | 165 |
| 5 Oct 1998 | Shaving Peaches | Total Vegas / EMI | 34 | – |
| 5 Feb 2001 | Good to Go | Total Vegas / Papillon Records | 48 | – |
| 24 Feb 2011 | Super Delux | Townsend Records | – | – |
| 20 Sep 2024 | We Are Not Robots | Total Vegas | 29 | – |

=== Extended plays ===
| Year | Release date | Record label | UK Albums Chart | AUS |
|---|---|---|---|---|
| 20 Sep 2024 | Verify | Total Vegas | – | – |

=== Compilation albums ===
| Release date | Title | Record label | UK Albums Chart | Notes |
|---|---|---|---|---|
| 24 Sep 2001 | Whales and Dolphins | Total Vegas / EMI | 78 | Greatest hits compilation |
| 4 Oct 2001 | The First and the Last... | Total Vegas | – | Sold only at gigs on the band's Farewell Tour |
| 26 Aug 2002 | The Essential Terrorvision | EMI Gold | – | Compilation |
| 15 Aug 2005 | B Sides And Rarities | EMI | – | Compilation |
| 12 Mar 2012 | Essential Terrorvision | Music Club Deluxe | – | Compilation |

=== Live albums ===
| Year | Release date | Record label | UK Albums Chart | Notes |
|---|---|---|---|---|
| 1994 | Live at Don Valley Stadium | Total Vegas / EMI | – | Promo |
| 20 Oct 2003 | Take The Money And Run: The Final Concert | Recall | – | Live album |
| 7 Nov 2005 | For One Night Only | Secret | – | Live album |
| 13 Apr 2009 | How to Make Friends and Influence People: Live at London Shepherds Bush Empire | Concert Live | – | Live album |
| 21 Apr 2017 | Regular Urban Survivors: Live at the Ritz | Total Vegas | – | Live album |
| 29 Mar 2019 | Party Over Here... Live in London | E.A.R. Music | – | Live album |

=== Singles ===
| Release date | Title | Chart positions | | | Album |
| Release date | Title | UK | AUS | IRE | Album |
|---|---|---|---|---|---|
| 17 Feb 1992 | Thrive EP | 100 | – | – | Formaldehyde |
| 7 Sep 1992 | "My House" | 112 | – | – | Formaldehyde |
| 8 Feb 1993 | Problem Solved EP | 190 | – | – | Formaldehyde |
| 7 Jun 1993 | "American TV" | 63 | – | – | Formaldehyde |
| 18 Oct 1993 | "New Policy One" | 42 | – | – | Formaldehyde |
| 27 Dec 1993 | "My House" (re-issue) | 29 | – | – | Formaldehyde |
| 28 Mar 1994 | "Oblivion" | 21 | 65 | – | How to Make Friends and Influence People |
| 13 Jun 1994 | "Middleman" | 25 | 149 | – | How to Make Friends and Influence People |
| 22 Aug 1994 | "Pretend Best Friend" | 25 | 163 | – | How to Make Friends and Influence People |
| 17 Oct 1994 | "Alice What's The Matter?" | 24 | – | – | How to Make Friends and Influence People |
| 6 Mar 1995 | "Some People Say" | 22 | – | – | How to Make Friends and Influence People |
| 19 Feb 1996 | "Perseverance" | 5 | 144 | – | Regular Urban Survivors |
| 22 Apr 1996 | "Celebrity Hit List" | 20 | – | – | Regular Urban Survivors |
| 8 Jul 1996 | "Bad Actress" | 10 | – | – | Regular Urban Survivors |
| 30 Dec 1996 | "Easy" | 12 | – | – | Regular Urban Survivors |
| 21 Sep 1998 | "Josephine" | 23 | – | – | Shaving Peaches |
| 18 Jan 1999 | "Tequila" | 2 | – | 20 | Shaving Peaches |
| 3 May 1999 | "III Wishes" | 42 | – | – | Shaving Peaches |
| 15 Jan 2001 | "D'Ya Wanna Go Faster" | 28 | – | – | Good to Go |
| 11 Jun 2001 | "Fists of Fury" | – | – | – | Good to Go |
| 8 Feb 2019 | "Alice What's the Matter?" (Live in London) | – | – | – | Party Over Here… Live in London |
| 8 Mar 2019 | "Perseverance" (Live in London) | – | – | – | Party Over Here… Live in London |
| 22 Mar 2019 | "Oblivion" (Live in London) | – | – | – | Party Over Here… Live in London |
| 29 Nov 2019 | "Our Christmas Song" | – | – | – | Non-album single |
| 14 Aug 2020 | "Coming Up" | – | – | – | Non-album single |
| 3 Dec 2021 | "Santa Never Came" | – | – | – | Non-album single |
| 26 Apr 2024 | "The Night Lemmy Died" | – | – | – | We Are Not Robots |
| 7 Jun 2024 | "Lucifer" | – | – | – | We Are Not Robots |
| 19 Jul 2024 | "You've Gotta Want to Be Happy" | – | – | – | We Are Not Robots |
| 30 Aug 2024 | "Baby Blue" | – | – | – | We Are Not Robots |
| 26 Jun 2026 | "Living with Me" | – | – | – | Non-album single |
| 4 Sep 2026 | "Love Ain't Cheap" | – | – | | Non-album single |
