= Britrock Must Be Destroyed =

2018 concert tour by Reef, the Wildhearts, and Terrorvision

- International tour by Reef, the Wildhearts, Terrorvision
- Location: United Kingdom, Australia (cancelled)
- Start date: 4 May 2018
- End date: 2 September 2018
- Legs: 2
- No. of shows: 13 total: 8 in United Kingdom; 5 in Australia (dates cancelled)

Britrock Must Be Destroyed was a 2018 tour featuring British rock bands Reef, the Wildhearts and Terrorvision. Announced in November 2017, the tour was originally for eight dates across the UK in May 2018, and later extended to five dates in Australia, across August and September. In February 2018, UK Britpop band Dodgy were announced as the opening act for all UK dates.

On 27 July 2018, it was announced that due to poor ticket sales and the high financial cost of touring in Australia, the Australian leg of the tour was cancelled.

== Tour dates ==
List of concerts, showing date, city, country, venue, and running order (billed first to last)
Date	City	Country	Venue	Running order
Leg 1 – United Kingdom
4 May 2018	Manchester	United Kingdom	Manchester Academy	The Wildhearts, Reef, Terrorvision
5 May 2018	Birmingham	United Kingdom	Digbeth Arena	Terrorvision, the Wildhearts, Reef
6 May 2018	London	United Kingdom	Eventim Apollo	Terrorvision, the Wildhearts, Reef
19 May 2018	Glasgow	United Kingdom	O2 Academy Glasgow	Terrorvision, Reef, the Wildhearts
20 May 2018	Newcastle	United Kingdom	O2 Academy Newcastle	Terrorvision, Reef, the Wildhearts
24 May 2018	Leeds	United Kingdom	O2 Academy Leeds	The Wildhearts, Reef, Terrorvision
25 May 2018	Bristol	United Kingdom	Motion	Terrorvision, the Wildhearts, Reef
26 May 2018	Portsmouth	United Kingdom	Guildhall	Terrorvision, the Wildhearts, Reef
Leg 2 – Australia
28 August 2018	Fremantle	Australia	Metropolis	Cancelled
29 August 2018	Adelaide	Australia	The Gov	Cancelled
31 August 2018	Brisbane	Australia	The Triffid	Cancelled
1 September 2018	Sydney	Australia	Metro Theatre	Cancelled
2 September 2018	Melbourne	Australia	170 Russell	Cancelled
