= Max Bauer =

German First World War staff officer

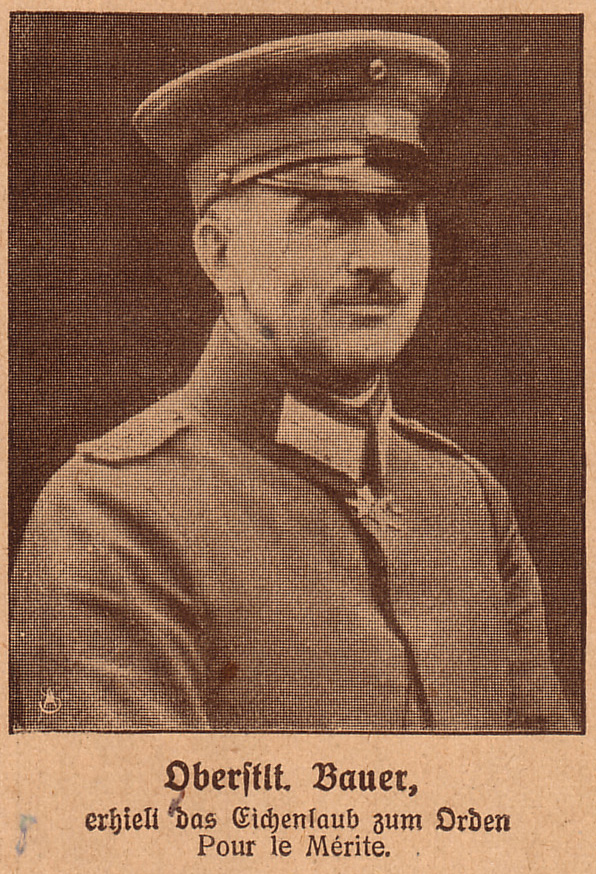
- Max Bauer in 1918
- Born: Max Hermann Bauer; 31 January 1869; Quedlinburg, Province of Saxony, North German Confederation
- Died: 6 May 1929 (aged 60) Shanghai, Republic of China
- Allegiance: German Empire; Weimar Republic; Republic of China
- Branch: Imperial German Army; Reichsheer
- Rank: Oberst
- Conflicts: Russo-Japanese War (Observer); World War I Kapp Putsch; Central Plains War
- Awards: Pour le Mérite

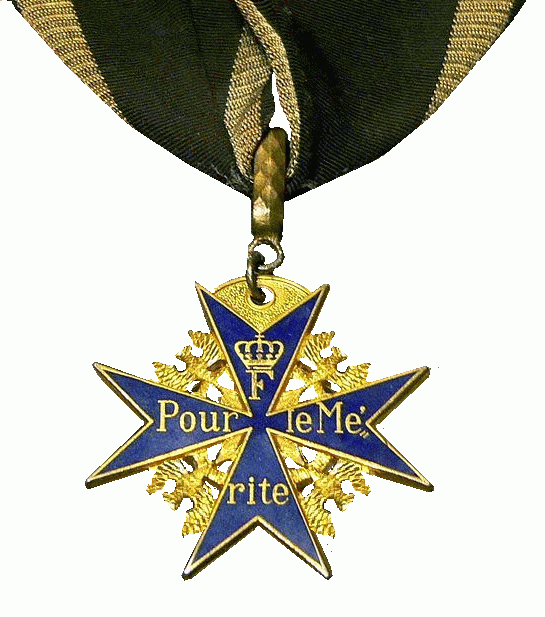
Cropped version of Pour Le Merite-The Blue Max.

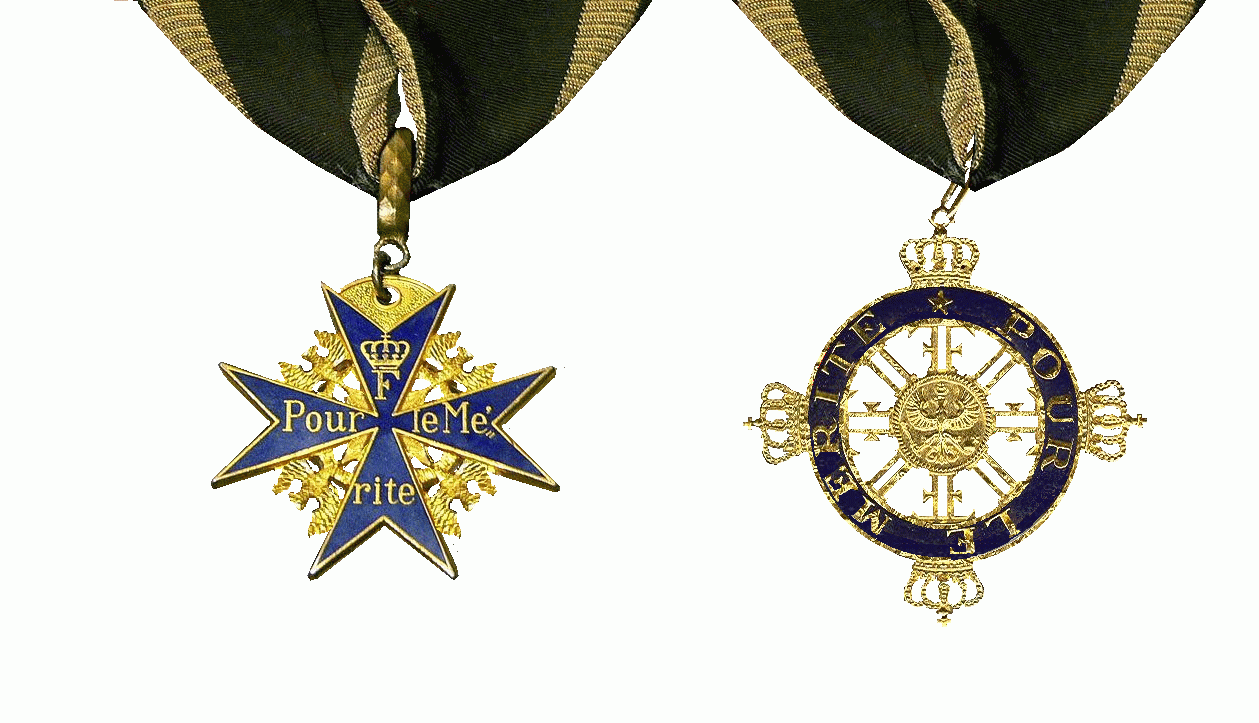
The Prussian Order Pour le Mérite in war and in peace.

Colonel Max Hermann Bauer (31 January 1869 – 6 May 1929) was a German General Staff officer and artillery expert in the First World War. As a protege of Erich Ludendorff he was placed in charge of the German Army's munition supply by the latter in 1916. In this role he played a leading role in the Hindenburg Programme and the High Command's political machinations. Later Bauer was a military and industrial adviser to President Chiang Kai-Shek of Nationalist China.

== Rising in the army ==
Bauer was born in Quedlinburg. He began to study medicine in Berlin, but then enlisted as an officer candidate in Foot Artillery Regiment 2 (heavy artillery) in 1888. The following year he attended the Kriegs-Schule in Hanover and then was commissioned. After regimental service, in 1898 he was appointed Adjutant to the Artillerie Prüfungskommission (Artillery Testing Commission). In 1902 he took command of a battery as a captain. An observer of the Russo-Japanese War (1904-05), he was impressed by how Japanese 28 cm mortars demolished Russian forts. When he returned in 1905 he joined the fortress section of the General Staff as their artillery expert, which made him conversant with the leaders of German industry, science, and engineering. Unable to obtain authorization to develop a new heavy mortar, he ordered one from Krupp nonetheless. When the War Ministry learned that a prototype was completed they wanted Bauer dismissed, but the firing tests were so impressive that further development was authorized in 1911. Meanwhile, in 1908 he moved into the mobilization section of the Staff directed by Erich Ludendorff — they became staunch friends. Ludendorff regarded him as the “smartest officer in the army”. In the following year Bauer was appointed as a General Staff Officer, remarkable because he had not had the customary specialized schooling. Helped by his contacts in industry, he studied how the German economy would function during a European war.

== The first years of World War I ==
When the war came Major Bauer was posted to the Operations Section of Oberste Heeresleitung (OHL, Supreme Army Command) as head of Section II, which was responsible for heavy artillery, mortars, and fortresses. Earlier in 1914, the first of the Krupp 42cm mortars, nicknamed "Big Bertha", and its concrete-piercing shells were ready. They smashed the forts in Belgium and northern France. In 1915 the huge guns forced the surrender of the formidable Russian fortifications in Poland, like Przemyśl, before dealing with the Serbian strongholds at Belgrade. For developing the mortars Bauer was awarded the Pour le Mérite and an honorary doctorate from the University of Berlin. (In 1918 he received the Oak Leaves for his Pour le Mérite. During the war he was awarded 25 German and foreign medals.)

Before the war he had worked with the chemist Fritz Haber to transform nitrogen from the air into explosive precursors, which let the Germans make war despite the Naval blockade of Germany preventing continued imports of supplies of nitrates that had come from Chile before the war. When the adversaries deadlocked in their trenches along the Western Front, Haber suggested that they could break through by releasing a cloud of poisonous chlorine gas, which is heavier than air. Bauer provided funds and scientists already in the army. Bauer, Haber and Duisberg, the head of the chemical cartel, and their horses were poisoned at the first field test; all were invalided for days. He was present at the first attack, which cleared the defenders out of miles of trenches defending the city of Ypres, but was "heartbroken" because Supreme Commander Erich von Falkenhayn had mounted only a diversionary attack, divulging their top-secret for almost no gain. Bauer continued to support the development of new gases, tactics to use them effectively despite protective masks, and Haber's mobilization of scientists for the war effort.

Section II of OHL Supreme Army Command carefully evaluated how their weapons performed on active service. For instance, in 1916 they produced a modified field gun that could be elevated to 40 degrees, compared to its former 16 degrees, and their light howitzer's range was increased 43 percent to 10,000 m (11,000 yd). They formed a unit to develop assault tactics using stormtroopers. Their first tank, introduced in May 1917, was too large and unwieldy, few were produced, so they had to use captured enemy tanks. Krupp and Daimler designed a light tank, but production was not authorized until French light tanks showed their value, consequently they could not be available until April 1919.

Bauer strongly opposed Falkenhayn's plan to attack Verdun in 1916 along a narrow front on the right bank of the Meuse, because their flank would be vulnerable to French artillery on the left bank—he was spot-on; before long they had to attack the left bank as well. While arranging artillery support before the attack he stayed at Fifth Army headquarters where he became a fast friend of its commander, Crown Prince Wilhelm; they kept in touch thereafter. In the first salvo of the attack a 42 cm shell struck Fort Douaumont, a key to the defense. It did not penetrate the reinforced concrete and sand layers: the Verdun forts were stouter than any the mortars had fired on hitherto. Later that year Bauer was dismayed by Falkenhayn's insistence along the Somme front on packing infantry into the foremost trenches to repel the attacks, where they were chewed-up by the Entente's artillery preparations. Bauer decided that Falkenhayn must be replaced by his friend Ludendorff, who had displayed virtuosity on the Eastern Front. Supported by junior officers at OHL he tirelessly lobbied the highest echelons of the army and government against his superior, with criticisms of Falkenhayn like "...his decisions were half measures and he wavered even over these." Falkenhayn was replaced on 29 August 1916 by Field Marshal Paul von Hindenburg as Chief of Staff with First Quartermaster General Ludendorff as his associate. To Bauer this was his greatest victory.

== Total War ==
The new commanders resolved to wage total war. OHL Supreme Army Command was reorganized, Bauer's Section II was responsible for heavy artillery, mortars and fortresses. Bauer set highly optimistic goals for weapon production, for instance tripling machine gun output, in what became known as the Hindenburg Program. His industrialist friends welcomed the orders but needed more workers. Skilled men were released from the armed forces and a bill making most men and women subject to national service was proposed to the Reichstag, which rejected the most extreme measures, like shutting the universities except for their medical schools. Compelling women to work was unnecessary, because already more were looking than there were jobs. The bill that finally passed was almost useless. Soon Bauer had a staff officer for propaganda and another stationed in Berlin for political liaison. Despite their exertions, "Unable to control labour and unwilling to control industry, the army failed miserably...."

Lieutenant General von Höhn's draft of a manual describing defense in depth was rewritten by Bauer and Captain Geyer. The crux was that any attackers who penetrated a lightly manned front line would be destroyed by counterattacks. Defense in depth became German Army doctrine through the Second World War.

OHL relied on his political judgment. Ludendorff and Bauer saw eye to eye: to them "To govern means to dominate." So of course they despised Chancellor Theobald von Bethmann Hollweg who tried to govern by consensus and hoped to negotiate a peace. They lobbied fervently against him. Bethmann was pressured into agreeing to unrestricted submarine warfare, which brought the United States into the war. On 10 June 1917 Bauer gave Matthias Erzberger, a leading catholic Reichstag deputy, a private, pessimist briefing, including his assessment that the U-boats could not win the war. Bauer had misfired. Instead of backing the struggle with a stiffer spine, Erzberger tabled a resolution for a negotiated peace without annexations. OHL fought back fiercely. The Crown Prince visited Berlin to pressure legislators. Bauer stayed in the capital, in the thick of the fight. Hindenburg and Ludendorff came there to threaten to resign. The Kaiser told them "there could be no justification for their presence in Berlin." They retreated to Headquarters to tweak their tactics. On 11 July 1917 Hindenburg and Ludendorff telegraphed their resignations unless Bethmann Hollweg was replaced and immediately released the telegrams to the press. Bethmann Hollweg resigned. The resolution was amended to call for "a peace of equilibrium" and passed by 212 to 126. It was ignored by the new Chancellor Georg Michaelis. OHL Supreme Army Command was in the political driver's seat, but their only objective was total victory.

Bauer worked with Krupp on the development of antiaircraft artillery and of the Paris guns that fired shells 130 kilometers (81 mi) but failed to dent civilian morale.

In 1918 OHL unleashed a series of massive attacks to bring victory. Each attack began with a multi-million shell hurricane artillery bombardment. Bauer assembled the guns that were commanded by Colonel Bruchmüller. Repeatedly they broke through British and French lines. After four successful months an attack on the French along the Marne River was bloodily repulsed and then on 17 July 1918 the right flank of their salient pointing towards Paris was crushed by a powerful, joint French and American attack led by massed tanks. Bauer realized that the war was lost and that "in decency” it should be ended. He notified his industrialist friends. Bauer and the Crown Prince agreed that Germany needed a dictator, their choice was Ludendorff. Their misreading of the nation's political situation was exposed when Ludendorff was dismissed on 25 October — so despised that for safety he fled the country. Vice-chancellor Friedrich von Payer, the only member of the administration also in the Reichstag, excoriated Bauer for his un-military political meddling. Bauer took this dressing-down as a tribute to his invaluable work; but he retired from active service on 31 October 1918, a few months after being promoted to Colonel. A close student of the war described Bauer: "There is a strange mixture of force and weakness, calculation and abandon, intelligence and illogic in this man."

== Post-war ==
He wrote about his experiences and national policy during the war. In 1920 Bauer and Ludendorff were among the leaders of the right-wing Kapp Putsch, which seized control of the government. They were forced out by a nationwide general strike. Ludendorff was let off but Bauer had to flee the country. He worked as a military consultant in the Soviet Union, Spain and Argentina. He returned to Germany in 1925 following an amnesty for all those involved in the Putsch.

In 1926, Chinese engineer Chu Chia-hua, president of the Sun Yat-Sen University in Canton, contacted Bauer for advice on military and business opportunities in China. In 1927, Bauer visited Chiang Kai-shek, who hired him as a military adviser, wishing to use his contacts to acquire more weapons and industrial assistance from Germany. This began Sino-German cooperation until 1941.

In 1928, Bauer returned to Germany to make contacts with German industries and the army. However, the Treaty of Versailles restricted arms production. In addition, he was persona non grata to the German government as he had participated in the Kapp Putsch. Nonetheless Bauer was able to establish a China trade department and to make contact with the secret German military mission in Nanking.

When Bauer returned to China, he advocated formation of a small core army supported by many local militia forces. Chiang did not use these ideas, since the militias would have concentrated military power in local hands. However, Bauer did manage to have the Whampoa Military Academy moved from Canton to Nanking, it became the Central Military Academy, and to staff it with German military advisers and instructors. He invited 20 German officers to China to work as instructors in military training and military intelligence. Officially, Bauer was Chiang's economic adviser and encouraged him to develop infrastructure.

Max Bauer died in Shanghai, of smallpox, on 6 May 1929, perhaps as a result of having been intentionally infected by one of his Chinese enemies, as he was the only person infected with the contagious disease in the region where he contracted it. He was buried in China with military honors. His ashes were later returned to Germany and buried at Swinemünde on 5 August 1929.

== See also ==
- Sino-German cooperation
- German-trained divisions of the National Revolutionary Army
