= Good to Go (Terrorvision album) =

Album by Terrorvision

Good To Go

Studio album by Terrorvision
- Released: 5 February 2001
- Genre: Alternative rock, Britpop, indie rock
- Length: 42:50
- Label: Papillon, Total Vegas

Terrorvision chronology
Shaving Peaches (1998)	Good To Go (2001)	For One Night Only (2005)

Professional ratings
Review scores
Source	Rating
Metal Hammer	9/10
Ox-Fanzine	Favorable

Good to Go is Terrorvision's final studio album, prior to their breakup in 2001. The sound of this album continues the band's musical evolution, with more electronic instruments and effects than previous albums. D'ya Wanna Go Faster was released as the first single, entering the singles chart at number 28 on February 21, 2001 for one week. Fists Of Fury was going to be released as the second single but instead was only sold as a limited edition blue vinyl release by the distributor.

== Track listing ==
1. D'ya Wanna Go Faster – 2:56
2. Come Home Beanie – 3:01
3. Friends & Family – 3:21
4. Sometimes I'd Like To Kill Her – 3:49
5. Alone – 2:53
6. Fists Of Fury – 3:42
7. Unhappy Millionaire – 3:36
8. Days Like These – 3:22
9. From Out Of Nothing – 4:15
10. Subway – 3:21
11. Goldmine Jamjar – 4:02
12. Spoiling Everything 4:28 (Hidden track - starts at – 12:03 into the "Goldmine Jamjar" track)
