= Auxiliary Services Act (1916) =

World War I German economic mobilization program

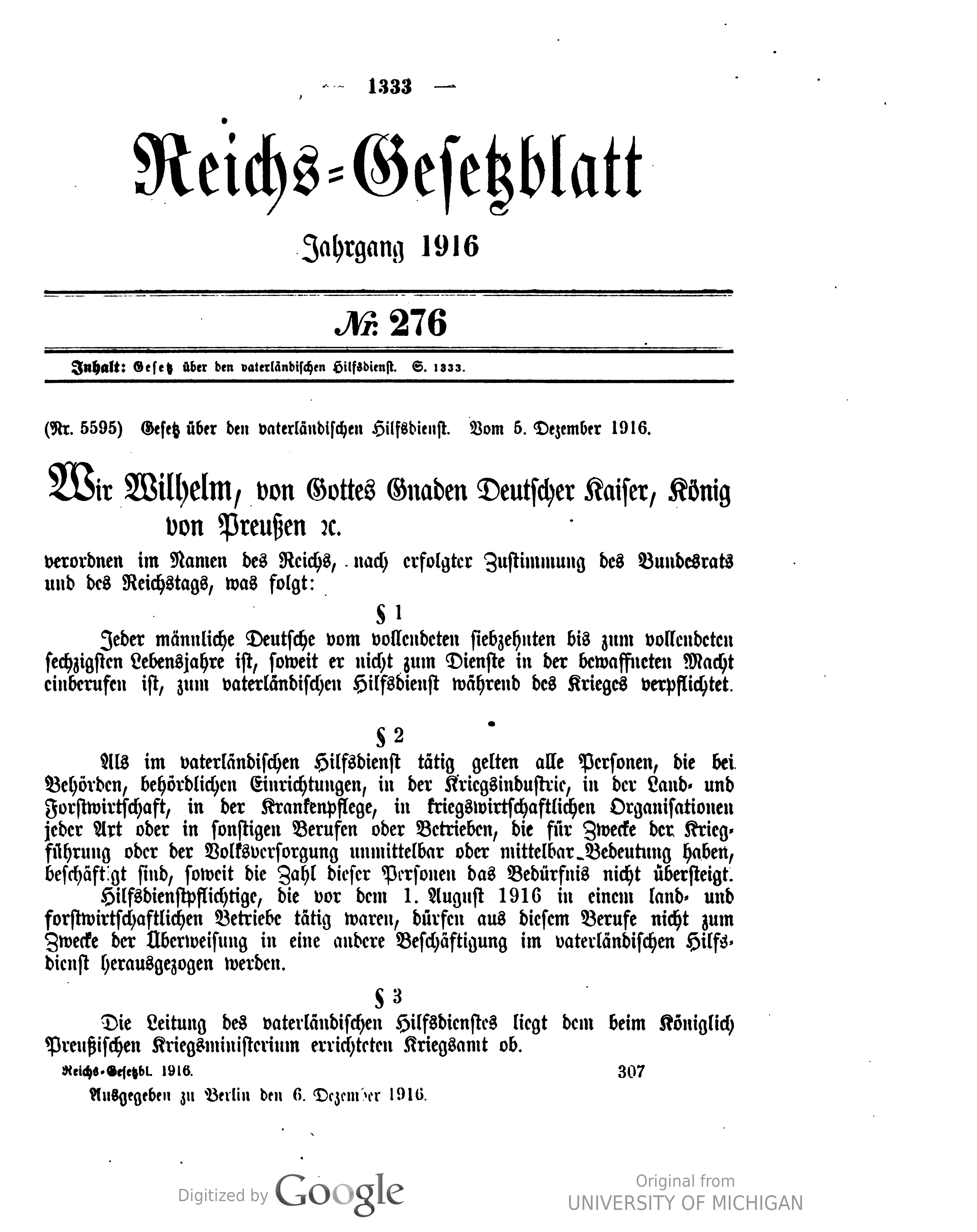
First page of the Auxiliary Services Act from the Imperial Law Gazette, 5 December 1916

The Auxiliary Services Act (German: Gesetz über den vaterländischen Hilfsdienst) was a law of the German Empire introduced during the First World War on 6 December 1916 to facilitate the Hindenburg Programme, an attempt by the military to mobilize scarce resources, including manpower, more efficiently for the war effort.

Under the terms of the act, every German male from the age of seventeen to sixty, unless he had been called up for service in the armed forces, was obligated to render national service during the war (§ 1). The types of workers considered to be in the national auxiliary service included those employed by public authorities, official agencies, war industries, agriculture and forestry, nursing, war-related organizations of any kind, or "in other occupations and trades that are directly or indirectly significant to waging war or economic regulation" (§ 2).

The Law on the Patriotic Auxiliary Service marked a significant stage towards total war and, in the long run, in the development of German labor law. The law was a step towards the total militarization of the economy and the mobilization of all material and personnel resources in a quest to make Germany fit for industrial warfare. However, to maintain the support of the Reichstag and the loyalty of workers, the German government made numerous concessions to help avoid labor conflicts. Thus the law provided for a system of shop-level mediation committees. In this way the state legally recognised the trade unions as equal negotiating partners with the employers. It also established the social partnerships between the economic associations of workers and employers. Thus both employee participation and trade union influence were expanded under the authority of the Reichstag.

The Prussian general Wilhelm Groener, head of the newly formed Kriegsamt (equivalent to an Office for Economic Warfare), was responsible for implementing the law.
