= Tony Wright (musician) =

- Born: Anthony David Wright; 6 May 1968 (age 58); Bradford, England
- Occupation: Musician
- Instruments: Vocals, guitar
- Label: EMI
- Member of: Terrorvision, Laika Dog
- Website: Tony Wright Official Website

Anthony David Wright (born 6 May 1968) is a British musician who is the lead singer of the British band Terrorvision and also the band Laika Dog.

== Early life ==
Wright was born in Bradford to David Wright, owner of a gallery in Bradford that showcased local artists. Originally wanting to become a designer, Wright was persuaded to take a Youth Training Scheme at a local printing firm.

He met the other founding members of Terrorvision whilst working as a glass-collector and barman in a local pub, and the band began their music career as The Spoilt Bratz.

== Solo career ==
In March 2014, Wright announced a solo acoustic project. In September 2014 he released his debut solo album Thoughts 'N' All. The album was met with a positive review on PureRawk.com which called it "Down to Earth, unpretentious and easy to get on with".

In August 2016, he released Walnut Dash.

== Other projects ==
Wright is the owner of Oldfield Press, and has produced a range of letterpress and woodcut printed cards that he sells online, at his coffee shop/print studio/venue (Bloomfield Square) in Otley, Yorkshire, and via a number of pop-up shops in the Keighley area. Following his career in Terrorvision, Wright also pursued a career in building miniature dry-stone walls which he sold in galleries around Yorkshire.

During his time with Terrorvision Tony Wright was a popular and frequent guest on the BBC2 TV programme Never Mind the Buzzcocks, and also presented Top of the Pops.
