= List of rock albums =

This is a list of rock albums that are particularly notable or influential. It has been derived by compiling lists published by professional sources. Each album has appeared in at least two notable lists describing the most influential rock and roll albums. The numbers following each entry describe the sources, which are listed at the article's key, which assigns each source a number. All the lists are self-described as rock and roll (or rock or rock music or other variants, though not more specific substyles like hard rock), though some artists would more commonly be described as reggae, blues, calypso, jazz, soul, country, funk, heavy metal or hip-hop. Many of the lists are ranked, but this is not taken into account—all albums on a list are included with the same cross-reference number, whether they are ranked #1 or #100 on that particular list.

== A ==
- AC/DC - Back In Black
- Aerosmith - Rocks
- Aerosmith - Toys in the Attic

== B ==
- The Band - The Band
- The Band - Music from Big Pink
- The Beach Boys - Pet Sounds
- Beastie Boys - Paul's Boutique
- The Beatles - Abbey Road
- The Beatles - A Hard Day's Night
- The Beatles - Revolver
- The Beatles - Rubber Soul
- The Beatles - Sgt. Pepper's Lonely Hearts Club Band
- The Beatles - The White Album
- Beck - Odelay
- Big Brother and the Holding Company - Cheap Thrills
- Blondie - Parallel Lines
- Boston - Boston
- David Bowie - Hunky Dory
- David Bowie - Low
- David Bowie - The Rise and Fall of Ziggy Stardust and the Spiders from Mars
- Jackson Browne - Late for the Sky
- Jackson Browne - Running on Empty
- James Brown - Live at the Apollo
- Jeff Buckley - Grace
- Buffalo Springfield - Buffalo Springfield Again
- The Byrds - Sweetheart of the Rodeo
- The Byrds - Mr. Tambourine Man

== C ==
- Ray Charles - Modern Sounds in Country and Western Music
- The Cars - The Cars
- Eric Clapton - 461 Ocean Boulevard
- The Clash - London Calling
- Joe Cocker - Mad Dogs and Englishmen
- Leonard Cohen - Songs of Leonard Cohen
- Sam Cooke - The Man and His Music
- Alice Cooper - Hey Stoopid
- Alice Cooper - Love It to Death
- Alice Cooper - School's Out
- Elvis Costello - Armed Forces
- Elvis Costello - My Aim Is True
- Elvis Costello - This Year's Model
- David Crosby - If I Could Only Remember My Name
- Sheryl Crow - C'mon, C'mon
- Sheryl Crow - The Globe Sessions
- Sheryl Crow - Sheryl Crow

== D ==
- Miles Davis - Bitches Brew
- Deep Purple - In Rock
- Deep Purple - Machine Head
- Deep Purple - Made in Japan
- Derek and the Dominos - Layla and Other Assorted Love Songs
- Bo Diddley - Bo Diddley/Go Bo Diddley
- Bo Diddley - Bo Diddley's Beach Party
- Dire Straits - Dire Straits
- The Doors - The Doors
- The Doors - L.A. Woman
- The Doors - Morrison Hotel
- Nick Drake - Bryter Layter
- Bob Dylan - Blonde on Blonde
- Bob Dylan - Blood on the Tracks
- Bob Dylan - Bringing It All Back Home
- Bob Dylan - Highway 61 Revisited
- Bob Dylan & The Band - The Basement Tapes

== E ==
- The Eagles - Desperado
- The Eagles - Hotel California
- Brian Eno - Another Green World

== F ==
- Fleetwood Mac - Rumours
- The Flying Burrito Brothers - The Gilded Palace of Sin
- Aretha Franklin - I Never Loved a Man the Way I Love You
- Aretha Franklin - Lady Soul

== G ==
- Peter Gabriel - So
- Marvin Gaye - What's Going On
- Genesis - Selling England by the Pound
- Grateful Dead - American Beauty
- Grateful Dead - Live/Dead
- Al Green - Call Me
- Guns N' Roses - Appetite for Destruction

== H ==
- PJ Harvey - To Bring You My Love
- PJ Harvey - Dry
- John Hiatt - Bring the Family
- Lauryn Hill - The Miseducation of Lauryn Hill
- Hole - Live Through This
- Buddy Holly - The "Chirping" Crickets
- Buddy Holly - 20 Golden Greats
- Hot Tuna - Hot Tuna
- Hüsker Dü - Zen Arcade

== J ==
- Jane's Addiction - Nothing's Shocking
- Jefferson Airplane - Surrealistic Pillow
- Jethro Tull - Aqualung
- Jethro Tull - Stand Up
- The Jimi Hendrix Experience - Axis: Bold as Love
- The Jimi Hendrix Experience - Electric Ladyland
- The Jimi Hendrix Experience - Are You Experienced
- Billy Joel - The Stranger
- Billy Joel - 52nd Street
- Elton John - Goodbye Yellow Brick Road
- Janis Joplin - Pearl
- Joy Division - Closer

== K ==
- B.B. King - Live at the Regal
- King Crimson - In the Court of the Crimson King
- The Kinks - Greatest Hits!
- The Kinks - Something Else by The Kinks
- The Kinks - The Kinks Are the Village Green Preservation Society

== L ==
- Led Zeppelin - Led Zeppelin
- Led Zeppelin - Led Zeppelin II
- Led Zeppelin - Led Zeppelin III
- Led Zeppelin - Led Zeppelin IV
- Led Zeppelin - Houses of the Holy
- Led Zeppelin - Physical Graffiti
- Led Zeppelin - Presence
- Led Zeppelin - In Through the Out Door
- John Lennon - Imagine
- John Lennon - Plastic Ono Band
- Linkin Park - Hybrid Theory
- Love - Forever Changes
- Lynyrd Skynyrd - (pronounced 'lĕh-'nérd 'skin-'nérd)

== M ==
- Massive Attack - Blue Lines
- John Mayall - Blues Breakers with Eric Clapton
- Paul McCartney & Wings - Band on the Run
- Metallica - Master of Puppets
- Metallica - The Black Album
- The Minutemen - Double Nickels on the Dime
- Joni Mitchell - Blue
- Joni Mitchell - Court and Spark
- The Modern Lovers - The Modern Lovers
- Van Morrison - Astral Weeks
- Van Morrison - Moondance
- My Bloody Valentine - Loveless

== N ==
- New York Dolls - New York Dolls
- Randy Newman - 12 Songs
- Randy Newman - Good Old Boys
- Nirvana - Nevermind

== O ==
- Oasis - (What's the Story) Morning Glory?
- Sinéad O'Connor - I Do Not Want What I Haven't Got

== P ==
- Pavement - Slanted and Enchanted
- Pavement - Crooked Rain, Crooked Rain
- Pearl Jam - Ten
- Pere Ubu - The Modern Dance
- Liz Phair - Exile in Guyville
- Pink Floyd - The Piper at the Gates of Dawn (1967)
- Pink Floyd - The Dark Side of the Moon (1973)
- Pink Floyd - Wish You Were Here (1975)
- Pink Floyd - The Wall (1979)
- Pixies - Doolittle
- Pixies - Surfer Rosa
- The Police - Synchronicity
- Elvis Presley - Elvis
- Elvis Presley - Elvis' Golden Records
- Elvis Presley - The Sun Sessions
- The Pretenders - Pretenders
- Prince - 1999
- Prince - Sign o' the Times
- Prince & the Revolution - Purple Rain

== Q ==
- Queen - A Night at the Opera

== R ==
- R.E.M. - Automatic for the People
- R.E.M. - Murmur
- R.E.M. - Out of Time
- Radiohead - Kid A
- Radiohead - OK Computer
- Radiohead - The Bends
- Bonnie Raitt - Nick of Time
- Ramones - Ramones
- Ramones - Rocket to Russia
- Red Hot Chili Peppers - Blood Sugar Sex Magik
- Otis Redding - Otis Blue: Otis Redding Sings Soul
- Lou Reed - New York
- Lou Reed - Transformer
- The Replacements - Let It Be
- The Replacements - Tim
- The Rolling Stones - Aftermath
- The Rolling Stones - Beggars Banquet
- The Rolling Stones - Exile on Main St.
- The Rolling Stones - Let It Bleed
- The Rolling Stones - Get Yer Ya-Ya's Out! The Rolling Stones in Concert
- The Rolling Stones - Some Girls
- The Rolling Stones - Sticky Fingers
- Roxy Music - For Your Pleasure

== S ==
- Santana - Abraxas
- Sex Pistols - Never Mind the Bollocks, Here's the Sex Pistols
- Paul Simon - Graceland
- Simon & Garfunkel - Bookends
- Simon & Garfunkel - Bridge over Troubled Water
- Sly & the Family Stone - Greatest Hits
- Sly & the Family Stone - Stand!
- Sly & the Family Stone - There's a Riot Goin' On
- The Smashing Pumpkins - Siamese Dream
- Patti Smith - Horses
- The Smiths - The Queen Is Dead
- Sonic Youth - Daydream Nation
- The Specials - The Specials
- Dusty Springfield - Dusty in Memphis
- Bruce Springsteen - Born to Run
- Bruce Springsteen - Born in the U.S.A.
- Bruce Springsteen - Darkness on the Edge of Town
- Bruce Springsteen - Nebraska
- Steely Dan - Aja
- Rod Stewart - Every Picture Tells a Story
- The Stone Roses - The Stone Roses
- The Stooges - Fun House

== T ==
- T. Rex - Electric Warrior
- Talking Heads - Remain in Light
- Talking Heads - Stop Making Sense
- James Taylor - Sweet Baby James
- Television - Marquee Moon
- The Temptations - Anthology
- Richard & Linda Thompson - Shoot Out the Lights
- Tina Turner - Private Dancer
- Teacher's Pet - Eh...Keras Tu!

== U ==
- U2 - Achtung Baby
- U2 - The Joshua Tree
- U2 - The Unforgettable Fire

== V ==
- Van Halen - Van Halen
- Various Artists (mostly by Jimmy Cliff) - The Harder They Come
- Various Artists (mostly by The Bee Gees) - Saturday Night Fever
- The Velvet Underground - The Velvet Underground
- The Velvet Underground - The Velvet Underground & Nico
- The Velvet Underground - White Light/White Heat

== W ==
- The Wailers - Burnin'
- The Wailers - Catch a Fire
- Tom Waits - Rain Dogs
- The Who - My Generation
- The Who - Tommy
- The Who - Quadrophenia
- The Who - Who's Next
- Stevie Wonder - Innervisions
- Stevie Wonder - Songs in the Key of Life
- Stevie Wonder - Talking Book

== X ==
- X (US) - Los Angeles

== Y ==
- Yes - Fragile
- Neil Young - After the Gold Rush
- Neil Young - Harvest
- Neil Young - Rust Never Sleeps
- Neil Young - Tonight's the Night

== Z ==
- Frank Zappa - Apostrophe
- Frank Zappa - Hot Rats
- Frank Zappa/Mothers of Invention - Freak Out!
- Frank Zappa/Mothers of Invention - We're Only in It for the Money
- The Zombies - Odessey and Oracle
