= Pixies =

Pixies may refer to:

- Plural of Pixie
- Pixies (band), an American alternative rock band from Boston, Massachusetts
  - Pixies (EP), 2002
- Pixies (film), a 2015 Canadian animated fantasy feature film
