= Di Suatu Hari, Di Suatu Waktu =

Studio album by Teacher's Pet
- Released: November 15, 1995
- Recorded: 1995
- Studios: Twin Studio; Digitron Studio
- Genres: Pop rock; Folk rock; World music; Country music
- Length: 47:37
- Language: Malay
- Label: Warner Music Malaysia
- Producers: Maman; Razman

Teacher's Pet chronology
| Eh...Keras Tu! (1994) | Di Suatu Hari, Di Suatu Waktu (1995) |

Singles from Di Suatu Hari, Di Suatu Waktu
- 1. "Kasih (Kupinjam Wajahmu)" Released: 1995; 2. "Cinta Kita" Released: 1995

Di Suatu Hari, Di Suatu Waktu (One Day, One Time) is the second and final studio album by the Singaporean rock band Teacher's Pet. It was released on 15 November 1995 by Warner Music Malaysia. The album includes the hit single "Kasih (Kupinjam Wajahmu)".

== Background ==
Following the release of the band's debut album, Addy, Jaybon, and Salleh returned to Singapore after a year, leaving Maman as the sole remaining member. Maman then decided to record a new album as a solo project, but retained the Teacher's Pet name for the album.

== Recording and production ==
=== Recording ===
The album was produced by Maman and Razman. The album was recorded at Twin Studio and Digitron Studio in Kuala Lumpur, Malaysia. Recording was supported by several session musicians, including Nasser Abu Kassim (bass guitar, percussion), Firdaus Mahmud (keyboards, piano, electric piano), Eddie Slam (keyboards, percussion), Yazid Search (drums), Mohar (flute), Shah Slam (acoustic guitar), Pacai Ekamatra (bass guitar), and the vocal group Shades as backing vocals. Maman also contributed acoustic, electric guitars and backing vocals.

=== Music ===
The album incorporates elements of pop rock, folk rock, world music, and country music. The album includes two English-language songs, "I Wrote This Song" and "Without You". Maman composed and wrote seven songs for the album. Other songwriters involved include Mark Kwan, Aznan Alias, Loloq and Zul Nazar.

== Release and critical reception ==
"Di Suatu Hari, Di Suatu Waktu" was released on 15 November 1995 through Warner Music Malaysia, with "Kasih (Kupinjam Wajahmu)" as the lead single.

The album received a positive review from Saniboey of Harian Metro, who praised Maman’s style and strong vocal performance.

== Controversy ==
Berjaya Filem Sdn Bhd, the producer of the film Cinta Kita, criticized Warner Music Malaysia for including the film's theme song, "Cinta Kita", on the album.

== Track listing ==
| No. | Title | Writer(s) | Length |
|---|---|---|---|
| 1. | "Kasih (Kupinjam Wajahmu)" | Maman; Loloq | 4:09 |
| 2. | "Masihkan Ada Harapan" | Maman | 4:50 |
| 3. | "Gejala" | Maman | 4:01 |
| 4. | "Di Suatu Hari, Di Suatu Masa" | Mark Kwan; Maman | 5:18 |
| 5. | "I Wrote This Song" | Maman | 4:15 |
| 6. | "Nama" | Maman | 5:20 |
| 7. | "Sering Kali" | Maman | 4:50 |
| 8. | "Kaulah (Jiwaku)" | Aznan Alias; Loloq | 4:48 |
| 9. | "Without You" | Mark Kwan | 4:16 |
| 10. | "Cinta Kita" | Zul Nazar; Dr. Wan Zawawi Ibrahim | 4:50 |
| Total length: | | | 47:37 |

== Personnel ==
Credits are adapted from the liner notes of Di Suatu Hari, Di Suatu Waktu.

- Maman – vocals, acoustic guitar, electric guitar, backing vocals, producer, arranger
- Razman – electric guitar, producer, arranger, mixing
- Nasser Abu Kassim – bass guitar, executive producer
- Rafi – acoustic guitar
- Nan – acoustic guitar, electric guitar
- Shah – acoustic guitar
- Cha'a – electric guitar
- Mohar – flute
- Firdaus – keyboards, piano, electric piano
- Eddie – keyboards, percussion, electric piano
- Yazid (Search) – drums
- Zahid Ahmad – drums
- Man Slam – drums
- Pacai – bass guitar
- Khairil Azli – piano
- Nizam – percussion
- Shades – backing vocals
- Dot – recording, mixing
- Amir, Chuby, Kong, Moses, Wong Tien Whye – recording engineers

== Accolades ==
| Award(s) | Year | Recipient(s) | Nominated work(s) | Category | Result | Ref |
|---|---|---|---|---|---|---|
| Anugerah Industri Muzik | 1996 | Teacher's Pet | Di Suatu Hari, Di Suatu Waktu | Best Album Recording | Won | |

== Release history ==
| Region | Release date | Edition(s) | Format(s) | Label(s) |
|---|---|---|---|---|
| Malaysia | 15 November 1995 | Standard edition | CD, Cassette | Warner Music Malaysia |
