= Crackity Jones =

Song by Pixies

from the album Doolittle
- Released: April 17, 1989
- Recorded: October 31–November 23, 1988 at Downtown Recorders in Boston, Massachusetts, United States
- Genre: Alternative rock; indie rock; punk rock
- Length: 1:24
- Label: 4AD (UK); Elektra Records (US)
- Songwriter: Black Francis
- Producer: Gil Norton

"Crackity Jones" is an alternative rock song by the American band Pixies, and is the ninth track on their 1989 album Doolittle. Written and sung by the band's frontman Black Francis, "Crackity Jones" describes a crazed roommate and was inspired by Francis' stay in an apartment block with a "weirdo, psycho, gay roommate" in Puerto Rico as a student.

== Background and lyrics ==
Black Francis was on a six-month trip to San Juan, Puerto Rico (the song's lyrics describe a "stinking island" that is "thirty miles by a hundred miles" long) as an exchange student as part of his college degree. He found himself in a squalid high-rise apartment (describing it as a "crazy all-male dormitory"), waiting for his assigned roommate to show up. Francis later described meeting his roommate:

He didn't show up for about a month. First thing he said to me, he had cut his finger or something, I had never even met him. It was like out of a David Lynch movie.

Francis continued to live with the roommate, but the roommate's rants about Fred Flintstone and the voices in his head tested Francis' patience. He returned to Boston after six months to start the Pixies with Joey Santiago.

"Crackity Jones" is the fastest and shortest song on Doolittle, at an average 150 beats per minute, and has a distinctly Spanish sound, with a G# and A triads over a C# pedal. The rhythm guitar, played by Francis, starts the song with an eighth-note downstroke (typical of punk rock music). Thirty-eight seconds into the song, the second verse accelerates and the rest of the song continues at a similarly fast tempo. The song ends with Francis shouting "You're crazy!".
