= Simon Larbalestier =

Simon Larbalestier (born 1962 in Pembrokeshire) is a Welsh photographer.

Larbalestier is noted for his collaborative work with Vaughan Oliver and the design studios 23 Envelope and v23 with whom he has provided photography used on the album artwork for bands such as the Pixies, Red House Painters, Heidi Berry, and other artists on the 4AD label. Much of the pair's collaborative work has been featured in the book Vaughan Oliver: Visceral Pleasures. His work has featured on many magazine covers for New Scientist and book covers for the publishers Random House and Secker & Warburg.

Graduating with a Master of Arts from the Royal College of Art, London in 1987, Larbalestier has described his final degree show as a turning point. Some of the images from this show became album artwork for the first Pixies EP Come On Pilgrim. Larbalestier went on to shoot images for all the Pixies albums notably Surfer Rosa, Doolittle and Bossanova providing a distinctive and influential imagery for the band. Larbalestier has had many solo and group exhibitions in Britain, Europe, Scandinavia, and the USA. His work during the 1990s and 2000s has included several landscape series of Italy, the USA and Australia and several documentary series on Thailand, Cambodia and other areas of South East Asia.

Larbalestier's work is predominantly black and white with subsequent toning added in the darkroom. More recently he has been producing digital images and working with strong colour. He retains an interest in decayed textures and unusual juxtapositions of subject matter as well as "empty spaces, desolation, and loneliness". His documentary series shot in Angkor Wat and Siem Reap deals strongly with the human condition through portraits and atmospheric images of vacant rooms and landscapes and details of possessions revealing how people live.

In 2009 Larbalestier and Oliver collaborated again on a limited edition box set re-issue of Pixies recordings, Minotaur, that includes a 72-page book of new photography and graphics.
