= Marquee Moon (song) =

Single by Television

from the album Marquee Moon
- Released: April 1, 1977
- Recorded: A & R Studios, NYC
- Genre: Punk rock
- Length: 9:58; 10:40 (re-issue); 4:31 (2019 edit)
- Label: Elektra
- Songwriter: Tom Verlaine
- Producers: Andy Johns, Tom Verlaine

Television singles chronology
"Little Johnny Jewel" (1975)	"Marquee Moon" (1977)	"Prove It" (1977)

"Marquee Moon" is a song by American rock band Television, recorded for their 1977 debut album of the same name. It was written by the band's lead vocalist and guitarist Tom Verlaine.

In the United Kingdom, "Marquee Moon" was released as a single on April 1, 1977. Its first pressing was as a 12" single only, limited to 25,000 copies, with the song in stereo on one side and in mono on the other side. Subsequent pressings of the single were as a 7-inch single, with the track split into two over the A-side and B-side.

== Composition ==
Each of the song's three verses begins with a double-stopped guitar intro before Billy Ficca's drums come in, and after the second chorus Richard Lloyd plays a brief guitar solo. After the third chorus, there is a longer solo by Tom Verlaine, based on a jazz-like Mixolydian scale, that lasts for the entire second half of the song. On the original vinyl edition of the album, the song faded out just short of ten minutes, but the CD reissues have included the full 10:40 of the take. In concert, the band has sometimes extended the song to as long as fifteen minutes.

== Release and reception ==
Despite its length, which would typically have been too long for most popular music radio formats, the song was released as a single in the U.K. and was a minor success, reaching number 30 on the UK Singles Chart. Because of its length, the song had to be divided between the two sides of a 7" record: "Marquee Moon" (Part I) (3:13) b/w "Marquee Moon" (Part II) (6:45). The song was also released in the UK as a limited edition 12" vinyl single. A mono recording of the song served as the B-side of the 12" single, and an alternate take was issued in 2003 on the remastered CD version of the album, Elektra/Rhino R2 73920.

"Marquee Moon" was ranked at number 381 in the 2004 edition of Rolling Stone magazine's list of the 500 greatest songs of all time, and appeared again at number 173 in the list's 2021 edition; Rolling Stone also ranked the song number 41 on its 100 Greatest Guitar Songs list in 2008. The guitar bridge from the song is quoted by Elvis Costello in his 1996 song "You Bowed Down".

== Personnel ==
Credits are adapted from the album's liner notes.

- Tom Verlaine – guitar, vocals, keyboards
- Richard Lloyd – guitar
- Billy Ficca – drums
- Fred Smith – bass
