= Marquee Moon =

1977 album by Television

Studio album by Television
- Released: February 8, 1977
- Recorded: November 1976
- Studio: A & R Recording (New York)
- Genres: Rock; post-punk; art punk; new wave; punk rock; garage rock
- Length: 45:54
- Label: Elektra
- Producers: Andy Johns; Tom Verlaine

Television chronology
Marquee Moon (1977)	Adventure (1978)

Singles from Marquee Moon
- 1. "Marquee Moon" Released: April 1, 1977; 2. "Prove It" Released: July 22, 1977

Marquee Moon is the debut album by the American rock band Television, released on February 8, 1977, by Elektra Records. In the years leading up to the album, Television had become a prominent act in the New York music scene and generated interest from a number of record labels, eventually signing a record deal with Elektra. The group rehearsed extensively in preparation for Marquee Moon before recording it at A & R Recording in November 1976. It was produced by the band's frontman Tom Verlaine and sound engineer Andy Johns.

For Marquee Moon, Verlaine and fellow guitarist Richard Lloyd abandoned contemporary punk rock's power chords in favor of rock and jazz-inspired interplay, melodic lines, and counter-melodies. The resulting music is largely hook-driven with complex instrumental parts (particularly on longer tracks such as "Marquee Moon"), while evoking themes of adolescence, discovery, and transcendence through imagery in urban, pastoral, and nocturnal modes, including references to the geography of Lower Manhattan. Influenced by Bohemian and French poetry, Verlaine's lyrics also feature puns and double entendres intended to give the songs an impressionistic quality in describing his perception of an experience.

Released to widespread acclaim, Marquee Moon was hailed by critics as an original musical development in rock music. The critical recognition helped the album achieve unexpected commercial success in the United Kingdom, despite poor sales in the United States. Among the most acclaimed music releases in history, it consistently features in professionally curated lists of top albums, including various iterations of Rolling Stone magazine's "The 500 Greatest Albums of All Time", on which it ranked 128th in the 2003 list and 107th in the 2020 list. Marquee Moon also proved to be a foundational record of alternative rock, as Television's innovative instrumentation on the album strongly influenced subsequent post-punk, new wave, and indie rock movements of the 1980s and rock guitar playing in general.

== Background ==
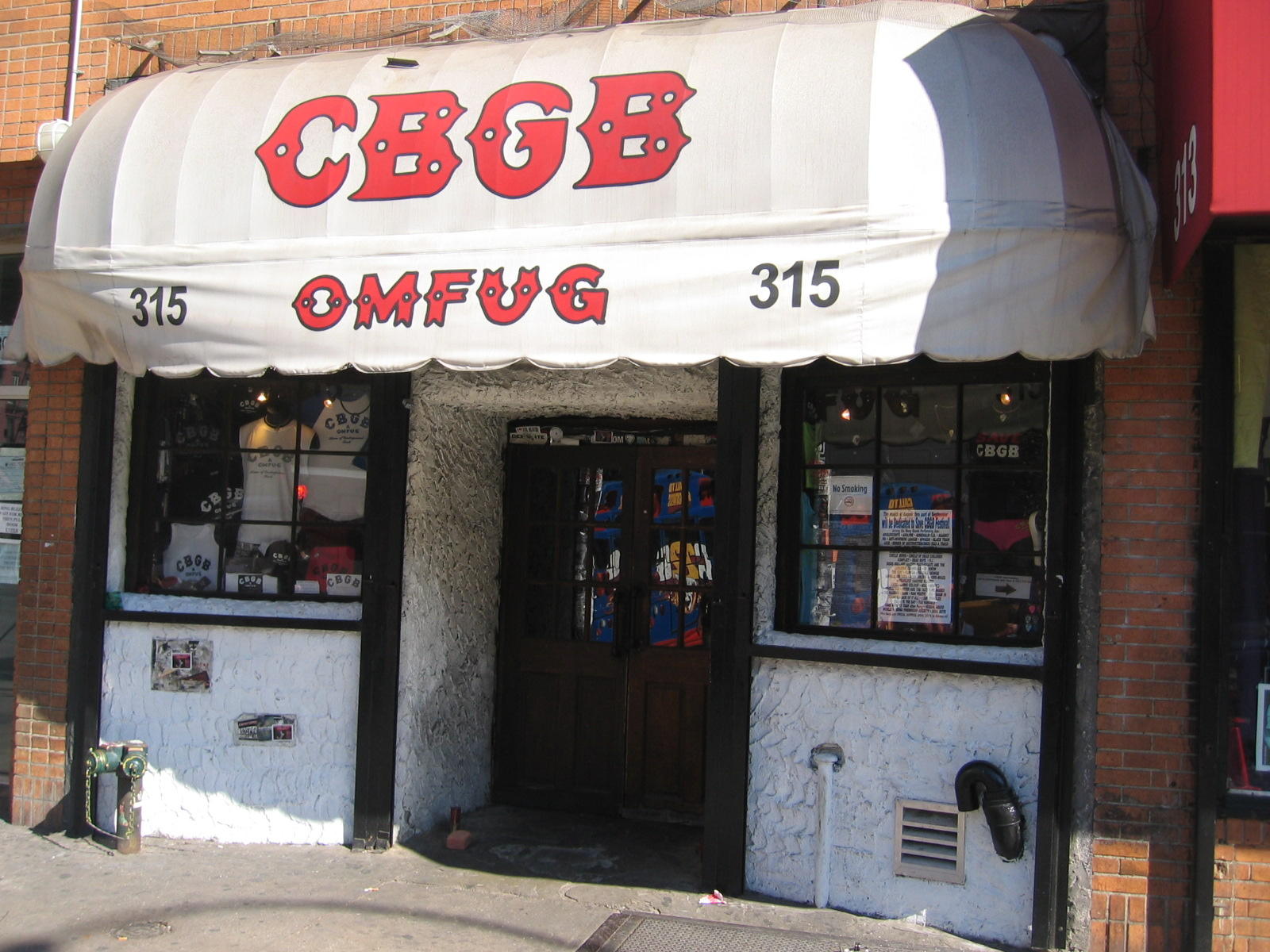
Lower Manhattan's CBGB in 2005. Television performed there regularly before recording Marquee Moon.

By the mid-1970s, Television had become a leading act in the New York music scene. They first developed a following from their residency at the Lower Manhattan club CBGB, where they helped persuade club manager Hilly Kristal to feature more unconventional musical groups. The band had received interest from labels by late 1974, but chose to wait for an appropriate record deal. They turned down a number of major labels, including Island Records, for whom they had recorded demos with producer Brian Eno. Eno produced demos of "Prove It", "Friction", "Venus", and "Marquee Moon" in December 1974, but Television frontman Tom Verlaine did not approve of Eno's sound: "He recorded us very cold and brittle, no resonance. We're oriented towards really strong guitar music ... sort of expressionistic."

After founding bassist Richard Hell left in 1975, Television enlisted Fred Smith, whom they found more reliable and rhythmically adept. The band quickly developed a rapport and a musical style that reflected their individual influences: Smith and guitarist Richard Lloyd had a rock and roll background, drummer Billy Ficca was a jazz enthusiast, and Verlaine's tastes varied from the rock group 13th Floor Elevators to jazz saxophonist Albert Ayler. That same year, Television shared a residency at CBGB with singer and poet Patti Smith, who had recommended the band to Arista Records president Clive Davis. Although he had seen them perform, Davis was hesitant to sign them at first. He was persuaded by Smith's then boyfriend Allen Lanier to let them record demos, which Verlaine said resulted in "a much warmer sound than Eno got". However, Verlaine still wanted to find a label that would allow him to produce Television's debut album himself, even though he had little recording experience.

== Recording and production ==
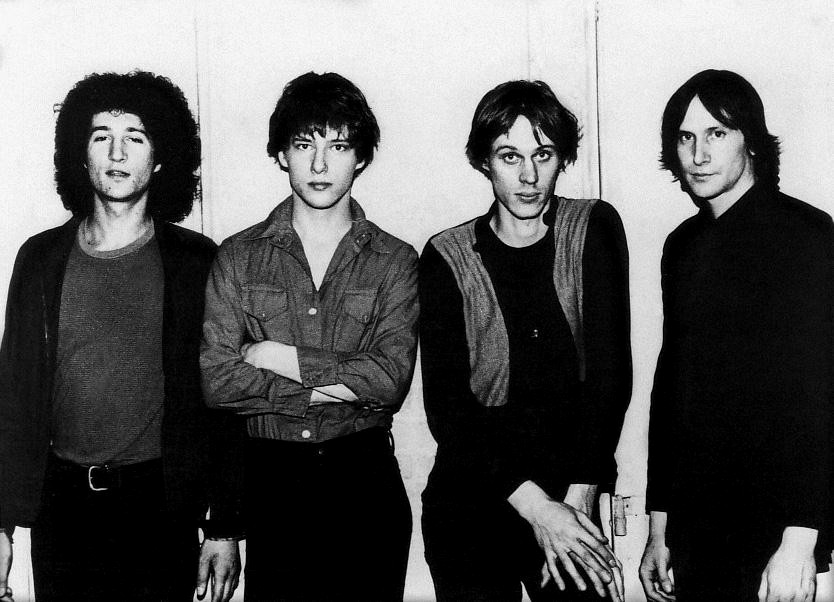
Television in 1977 with the lineup that recorded the album: from left, drummer Billy Ficca, guitarist Richard Lloyd, guitarist-vocalist Tom Verlaine, and bassist Fred Smith

In August 1976, Television signed a recording deal with Elektra Records, which promised Verlaine he could produce the band's first album with the condition that he would be assisted by a well-known recording engineer. Verlaine, who did not want to be guided in the studio by a famous producer, enlisted engineer Andy Johns based on his work for the Rolling Stones' 1973 album Goats Head Soup. Lloyd was also impressed by Johns, who he said had produced "some of the great guitar sounds in rock". Johns was credited as the co-producer on Marquee Moon. Elektra did not query Television's studio budget for the recording.

Television recorded Marquee Moon in November 1976 at A & R Recording in New York City. In preparation for the album's recording, Television had rehearsed for four to six hours a day and six to seven days a week. Lloyd said they were "both really roughshod musicians on one hand and desperadoes on the other, with the will to become good". During preparations, the band rejected most of the material they had written over the course of three years. Once they were in the studio, they recorded two new songs for the album—"Guiding Light" and "Torn Curtain"—and older songs such as "Friction", "Venus", and the title track, which had become a standard at their live shows. Verlaine said that, because he had predetermined the structure of the album, only those eight songs and a few others were attempted during the recording sessions.

For most of Marquee Moon, Johns recorded Television as they performed live in the studio. A few songs were recorded in one take, including the title track, which Ficca assumed was a rehearsal. Johns suggested that the group record another take of the song, but Verlaine told him to "forget it". Verlaine and Lloyd's guitars were recorded to the left and right channels respectively, and the final recordings were left unadorned by effects or compression.

== Music ==
"See No Evil"
The short, hook-driven song features dual guitar playing by Verlaine and Lloyd, who performed the solo.

Marquee Moon is described by Rolling Stone as a post-punk album and by Jason Heller from The A.V. Club as "elegantly jagged" art punk, while Ira Robbins of Trouser Press classified it as new wave. It is also described as punk rock by Rolling Stone and Tyler Wilcox of Pitchfork. Robert Christgau regarded it more broadly as a rock record because of Television's formal and technical abilities as musicians: "It wasn't punk. Its intensity wasn't manic; it didn't come in spurts." As Tom Moon observed, Verlaine's singing avoids the "cursory punk snarl" while the band's music demonstrates "extended instrumental sections, impenetrable moods" (as on "Torn Curtain") and historical rock influences like Chuck Berry and the early music of the Rolling Stones (as on "Friction").

At its core, Television’s Marquee Moon is shockingly economical—a tightly wound web of simple guitar parts wrapped around Tom Verlaine’s straightforward and impressionistic songwriting. Taken out of context, the guitar solos on Marquee Moon aren’t just unimpressive; they’re downright illogical. Everyone who plays guitar will, at some point, learn the solo from “Stairway to Heaven,” but it’s practically impossible to sit down and actually play anything from Marquee Moon.

— Matt LeMay of Pitchfork (June 23, 2004)

Both sides of the album begin with three shorter, hook-driven songs, which Stylus Magazine's Evan Chakroff said veer between progressive rock and post-punk styles. The title track and "Torn Curtain" are longer and more jam-oriented. "As peculiar as it sounds, I've always thought that we were a pop band", Verlaine later told Select. "You know, I always thought Marquee Moon was a bunch of cool singles. And then I'd realise, Christ, [the title track] is ten minutes long. With two guitar solos." According to Stephen Thomas Erlewine, the album is "comprised entirely of tense garage rockers that spiral into heady intellectual territory, which is achieved through the group's long, interweaving instrumental sections".

Verlaine and Lloyd's guitar parts on the album are interplayed around the rhythm section's drum hits and basslines. Their dual playing draws on 1960s rock and avant-garde jazz styles, abandoning the power chords of contemporary punk rock in favor of melodic lines and counter-melodies. According to Ryan Reed of Paste Magazine, their guitar work "bordered on the psychedelic." Verlaine's guitar establishes the song's rhythmic phrase, against which Lloyd is heard playing dissonant melodies. Lloyd had learned to notate his solos by the time they recorded Marquee Moon, allowing him to develop his solo for a song from introduction to variation and resolution. Some songs have the two guitarists trading rhythmic and melodic lines several times while producing tension. "There weren't many bands where the two guitars played rhythm and melody back and forth, like a jigsaw puzzle", Lloyd said.

Most of the solos on Marquee Moon follow a pattern wherein Verlaine runs up a major scale but regresses slightly after each step. On "See No Evil", he solos through a full octave before playing a blues-influenced riff, and on the title track, he is heard playing in the Mixolydian mode and lowering the seventh by half a step. "Friction" opens with Lloyd playing octaves before Verlaine's ringing harmonics and series of descending scales.

=== Lyrics ===
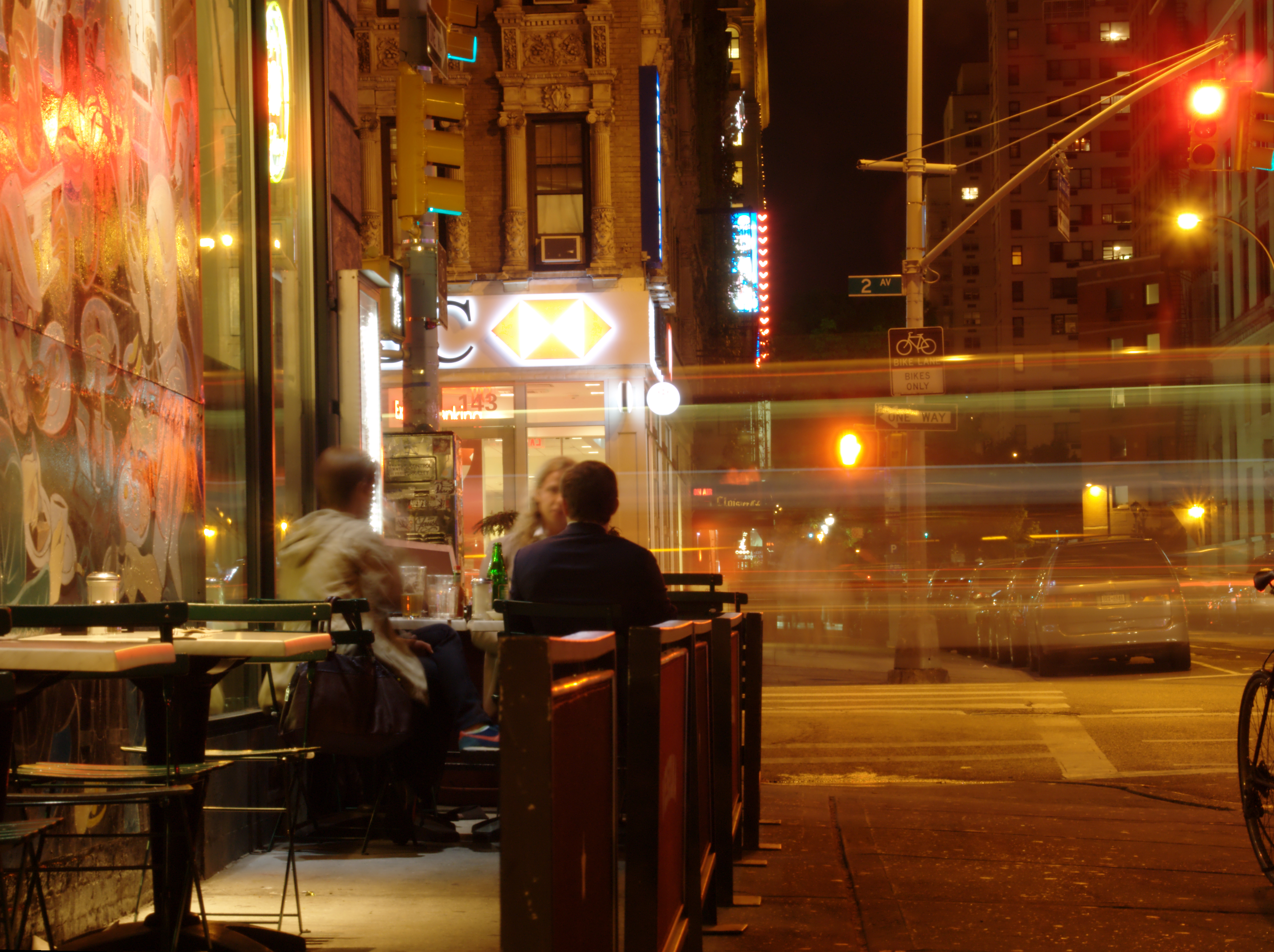
An East Village sidewalk by Veselka at night, 2011. Verlaine's nocturnal lyrics and geographical references led critics to associate Marquee Moon with the New York City neighborhood.

Verlaine's lyrics on Marquee Moon combine urban and pastoral imagery. Although it is not a concept album, many of its songs make geographical references to Lower Manhattan. According to Bryan Waterman, author of the 33⅓ book on the record, it celebrates stern adolescence in the urban pastoral mode. Its urban nocturne theme is derived from poetic works about Bohemian decadence. According to Spin, the album is about urban mythology; Verlaine brought "a sentimental romanticism to the Bowery, making legends out of the mundane". The lyrics also incorporate maritime imagery, including the paradoxical "nice little boat made out of ocean" in "See No Evil", the waterfront setting in "Elevation", sea metaphors in "Guiding Light", and references to docks, caves, and waves in "Prove It".

Although Verlaine was against drug use after Television formed, he once had a short-lived phase using psychedelic drugs, to which he makes reference in similes on songs like "Venus". Its vignette-like lyrics follow an ostensibly drug-induced, revelatory experience: "You know it's all like some new kind of drug / my senses are sharp and my hands are like gloves / Broadway looks so medieval, it seems to flap like little pages / I fell sideways laughing, with a friend from many stages."

According to Waterman, while psychedelic trips informed the experiences of many artists in Lower Manhattan at the time, "Venus" contributed to the impression of Marquee Moon as a transcendental work in the vein of 19th-century Romanticism. "Verlaine is into perception", Waterman said, "and sometimes the perception he represents is as intense as a mind-altering substance." Christgau said that lyrics such as the reference to Broadway in "Venus" lent the album its association among critics to the East Village, as it "situates this philosophical action in the downtown night".

What I love most about the lyrics of Marquee Moon is their evocation of that youthful moment when you're this close to figuring everything out, voicing in very few words a multivalence worthy of that adventure's complexity and confusion—beautifully, profoundly, naively, contradictorily, romantically, kinetically, jokily, cockily, fearfully, drunkenly, goofily, impudently—so nervous and excited you could fly, or is it faint?

— Robert Christgau (Going Into the City, 2015)

Marquee Moon inspired interpretations from a variety of sources, but Verlaine conceded he did not understand the meaning behind much of his lyrics. He drew on influences from French poetry and wanted to narrate the consciousness or confusion of an experience rather than its specific details. He compared the songs to "a little moment of discovery or releasing something or being in a certain time or place and having a certain understanding of something".

Verlaine also used puns and double-entendres when writing his lyrics, which he said are atmospheric and convey the meaning of a song implicitly. "See No Evil" opens with the narrator's flights of fancy and closes with an imperative about limitless possibilities: "Runnin' wild with the one I love / Pull down the future with the one you love". The refrain to "Venus" mentions falling into "the arms of Venus de Milo" (the armless statue), which Verlaine explained as "a term for a state of feeling. They're loving [ubiquitous] arms".

== Title and packaging ==
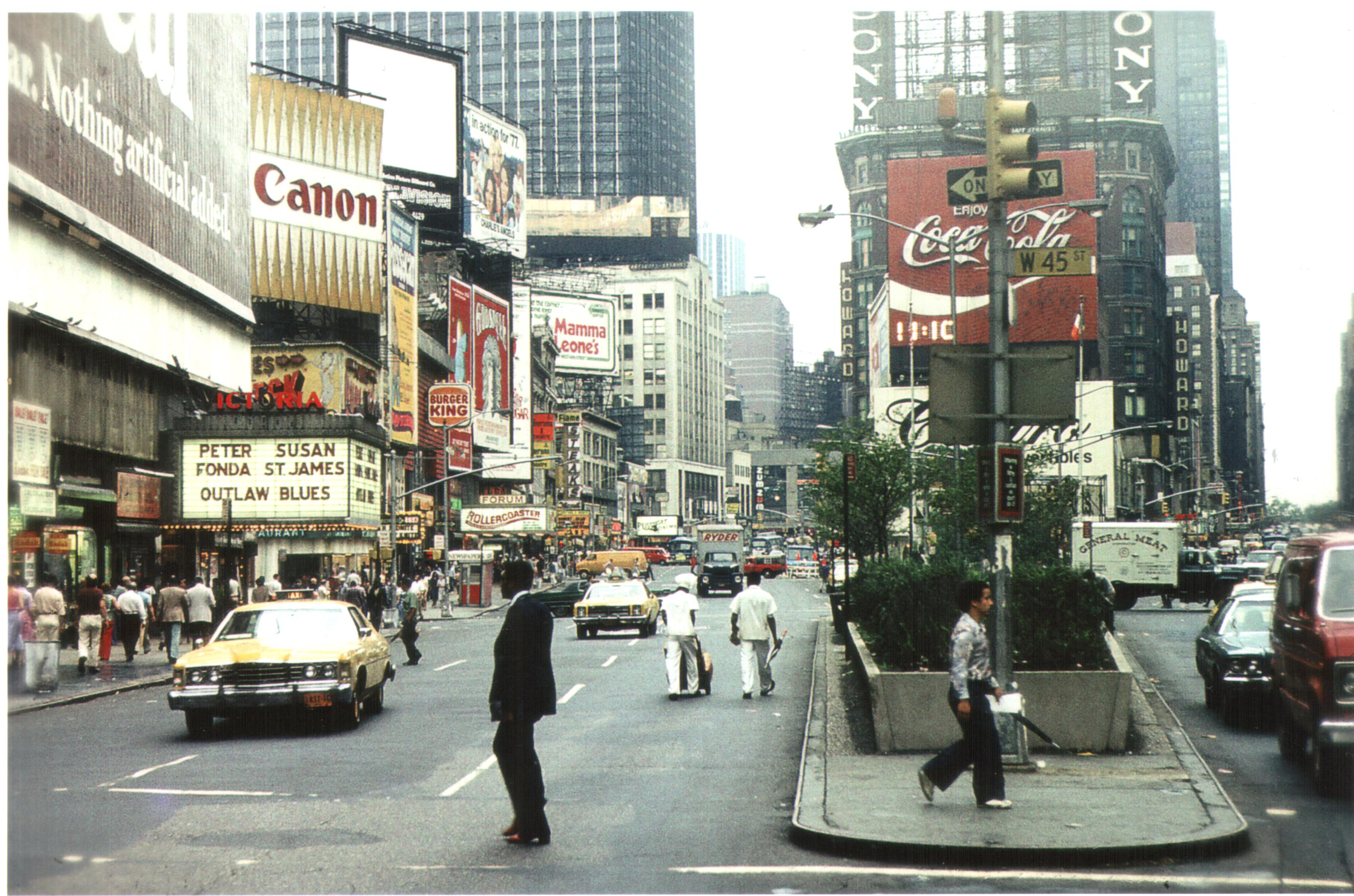
Times Square (1977), where the cover photo's print shop was located

Marquee Moon's title was interpreted by Waterman as an encapsulation of the urban and bucolic imagery in the songs, "suggesting the kind of night sky only visible above the neon glare of city-dwellers' assault on the dark". In his mind, the marquee rather than the moon in the concept sets the record's mood. He added, "sensory experience will be of prime importance to these eight songs. What can we see by the light of a marquee moon? What will be revealed on Marquee Moon's grooves?"

The album's packaging was designed by art director Tony Lane. The front cover photo was shot by photographer Robert Mapplethorpe, who had previously shot the cover for Patti Smith's 1975 album Horses. His photo situated Verlaine a step in front of the rest of the band, who were captured in a tensed, serious pose. Verlaine held his left hand across his body and extended his slightly clenched right hand forward. When Mapplethorpe gave Television the contact prints, Lloyd took the band's favorite shot to a print shop in Times Square and asked for color photocopies for the group members to mull over. Although the first few copies were oddly colored, Lloyd asked the copy worker to print more "while turning the knobs with his eyes closed". He likened the process to Andy Warhol's screen prints. After he showed it to the group, they chose the altered copy over Mapplethorpe's original photo, which Fred Smith subsequently had framed and kept for himself.

== Marketing and sales ==
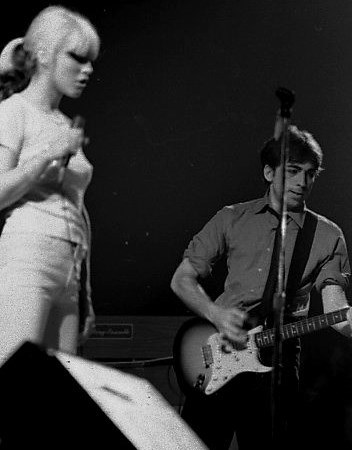
To promote the album, Television toured the United Kingdom with Blondie (band members Debbie Harry and Chris Stein pictured in 1977).

Marquee Moon was released on February 8, 1977, in the United States and on March 4 in the United Kingdom, where it was an unexpected success and reached number 28 on the albums chart. The record's two singles—the title track and "Prove It"—both charted on the UK Top 30. Its commercial success in the UK was partly fueled by Nick Kent's rave two-page review of the album for NME.

While holidaying in London after Marquee Moon's completion, Verlaine saw that Television had been put on NME's front cover and notified Elektra's press department, who encouraged the band to capitalize on their success there with a tour of the UK. However, the label had already organized for the band to perform on Peter Gabriel's American tour as a supporting act. Television played small theatres and some larger club venues, and received more mainstream exposure, but were not well received by Gabriel's middle-American audiences, and found the tour unnerving.

In May, Television embarked on a highly successful theatre tour of the UK with Blondie as their supporting act. They were enthusiastically received by audiences there, and Verlaine said it was refreshing to perform at large theatres after playing smaller clubs for four years. He nonetheless felt that Blondie did not suit their show because they were too different artistically, even though both groups had emerged from the music scene at CBGB. Blondie guitarist Chris Stein said that Television were "so competitive" and unaccommodating on the tour, and that they did not treat it like a joint effort. He recalled one show where "all our equipment was shoved up at the [Glasgow] Apollo and we had like three feet of room so that [Verlaine] could stand still in this vast space."

By the time of Television's return to the US, Elektra had given up on promoting Marquee Moon, which they dismissed as a commercial failure. Marquee Moon sold fewer than 80,000 copies in the US and failed to chart on the Billboard 200. The group was dispirited by their inability to meet commercial expectations, which contributed to their disbandment in 1978.

== Critical reception and legacy ==
1977 professional reviews
Review scores
Source	Rating
Hi-Fi News & Record Review	A+
Sounds	5/5 stars
The Village Voice	A+

Marquee Moon was met with critical acclaim. According to music journalist and biographer Tony Fletcher, critics in 1977 found the album difficult to categorize and instead hailed it as "something entirely original, a new dawn in rock music". Verlaine later said of the overwhelmingly positive response from critics:

There was a certain magic happening, an inexplicable certainty of something, like the momentum of a freight train. That's not egoism but, if you cast a spell, you don't get flummoxed by the results of your spell."

In NME, Kent wrote that Television have proven to be ambitious and skilled enough to achieve "new dimensions of sonic overdrive" with an "inspired work of pure genius, a record finely in tune and sublimely arranged with a whole new slant on dynamics". He deemed the album's music vigorous, sophisticated, and innovative at a time when rock is wholly conservative. For Sounds, Vivien Goldman hailed Marquee Moon as "an obvious, unabashed, instant classic", while Peter Gammond of Hi-Fi News & Record Review called it one of the most exciting releases in music, highlighted by Verlaine's steely, Gábor Szabó-like guitar and authentic rock music. In Audio, Jon Tiven wrote that although the vocals and production could be more amplified, Verlaine's lyrics and guitar "manage to viscerally and intellectually grab the listener". Joan Downs from Time felt the band's sound is distinguished more by the bold playing of Lloyd, who she said has the potential to become a major figure in rock guitar. Christgau, in The Village Voice, claimed Verlaine's "demotic-philosophical" lyrics could sustain the album alone, as could the guitar playing, which he said is as penetrating and expressive as Eric Clapton or Jerry Garcia "but totally unlike either". Tom Hull, his colleague at the Voice, recalls being in Christgau's apartment when he received an advance copy and witnessing his "instantly rapturous" reaction to the album. "Without being a guitar fetishist", Hull said he personally found it "as distinctive and powerful as any of its iconic peers—things like Axis and Layla and Led Zep's first album".

Some reviewers expressed reservations. In Rolling Stone, Ken Tucker said the lyrics generally amount to non sequiturs, meaningless phrases, and pretentious aphorisms, but are ultimately secondary to the music. Although he found Verlaine's solos potentially formless and boring, Tucker credited him for structuring his songs around chilling riffs and "a new commercial impulse that gives his music its catchy, if slashing, hook". High Fidelity felt the music's "scaring amalgam of rich, brightly colored textures" compensates for Verlaine's nearly unintelligible lyrics. Noel Coppage from Stereo Review was more critical of the singing and songwriting, likening Marquee Moon to a stale version of Bruce Springsteen. Nigel Hunter wrote in Gramophone that Verlaine's lyrics and guitar playing are vague and that listeners will need a "strong commitment to this type of music to get much out of it".

At the end of 1977, Marquee Moon was voted the third-best album of the year in the Pazz & Jop, an annual poll of American critics nationwide, published in The Village Voice. Christgau, the poll's creator and supervisor, ranked it number one on his own year-end list, and a few years later, he named it the 11th best album of the 1970s. Sounds also named it the year's best album, while NME ranked it fifth on its year-end list.

=== Reappraisal ===
Retrospective professional reviews
Review scores
Source	Rating
AllMusic	5/5 stars
Christgau's Record Guide	A+
Entertainment Weekly	A
Mojo	5/5 stars
MusicHound Rock	5/5
Pitchfork	10/10
Q	5/5 stars
Rolling Stone	5/5 stars
Spin Alternative Record Guide	10/10
Uncut	5/5 stars

Since the album's original release, Marquee Moon has been cited by rock critics as one of the greatest records of the American punk rock movement, with Mark Weingarten of Entertainment Weekly calling it the masterpiece of the 1970s New York punk rock scene. According to English writer Clinton Heylin, Marquee Moon marked the end of the New York scene's peak period, while Spin said it was the CBGB era's "best and most enduring record" and ranked it as the sixth-greatest album of all time in its April 1989 issue. Q included it in the magazine's 2002 list of the 100 greatest punk records, as did Rolling Stone in a list of the genre's top 40 albums published in 2016, while writer Colin Larkin ranked it ninth and Mojo ranked it 35th on similar lists. The album has often been voted high in critics' polls of the greatest debuts and has also been named one of the greatest records of the 1970s by NME, who ranked it tenth, and Pitchfork, who ranked it third.

Marquee Moon has frequently appeared on rankings of the greatest albums of all time. The Guardian and Melody Maker placed it 33rd and 25th, respectively, on lists published at the turn of the 21st century. In Larkin's 2000 book All Time Top 1000 Albums, Marquee Moon ranked at number 53. On September 23, 2003, the album was reissued by Rhino Entertainment with several bonus tracks, including the first CD appearance of Television's 1975 debut single "Little Johnny Jewel (Parts 1 & 2)". That same year, it was named the fourth-greatest album of all time by NME, while Rolling Stone placed it at number 128 on its list of the 500 greatest albums of all time. (Note: Rolling Stone later re-ranked the album on revised editions of the list, first at number 130 in 2012 and then at 107 in 2020.) In 2016, Paste Magazine named it the best post-punk album of all time; staff writer Ryan Reed commented that, by "capturing the fluid, technical, dynamic unison of the band's acclaimed live show, Marquee Moon stuck out like a sore thumb from the blooming punk scene ... Every moment is devastating, and the winding title track could be the greatest song to ever eclipse 10 minutes." It has been viewed as one of the greatest rock albums ever by English radio DJs Marc Riley, who said that "there's been nothing like it before or since", and Mark Radcliffe, who called it "the nearest rock record to a string quartet—everybody's got a part, and it works brilliantly."

=== Influence ===
Among the most influential records from the 1970s, the album has also been cited by critics as a cornerstone of alternative rock. It heavily influenced the indie rock movement of the 1980s, while post-punk acts appropriated the album's uncluttered production, introspective tone, and meticulously performed instrumentation. Hunter Felt from PopMatters attributed Marquee Moon's influence on post-punk and new wave acts to the precisely syncopated rhythm section of Fred Smith and Billy Ficca. He recommended 2003's "definitive" reissue of the album to listeners of garage rock revival bands, who he said had modeled themselves after Verlaine's Romantic poetry-inspired lyrics and the "jaded yet somehow impassioned cynicism" of his vocals. According to Sputnikmusic's Adam Downer, Television introduced an unprecedented style of rock and roll on Marquee Moon that inaugurated post-punk music, while The Guardian said it scaled "amazing new heights of sophistication and intensity" as a "gorgeous, ringing beacon of post-punk" despite being released several months before the Sex Pistols' Never Mind the Bollocks (1977). Erlewine, writing for AllMusic, believed the record was innovative for abandoning previous New York punk albums' swing and groove sensibilities in favor of an intellectually stimulating scope that Television achieved instrumentally rather than lyrically. He claimed "it's impossible to imagine post-punk soundscapes" without Marquee Moon. Fletcher argued that the songs' lack of compression, groove, and extra effects provided "a blueprint for a form of chromatic, rather than rhythmic, music that would later come to be called angular".

It changed the face of American music and thus music worldwide. It has touched grunge, nu-metal, punk, art-punk, pop, Radiohead and a thousand other genres where white men play guitars. Listen to the radio–Marquee Moon is everywhere.

— John Aizlewood (Q, 2003)

In Erlewine's opinion, Marquee Moon was radical and groundbreaking primarily as "a guitar rock album unlike any other". Verlaine and Lloyd's dual playing on the album strongly influenced alternative rock groups such as the Pixies, noise rock acts such as Sonic Youth, and big arena bands like U2. According to Greg Kot from the Chicago Tribune, Television "created a new template for guitar rock" because of how Verlaine's improvised playing was woven together with Lloyd's precisely notated solos, particularly on the title track. As a member of U2, Irish guitarist The Edge simulated Television's guitar sound with an effects pedal. He later said he had wanted to "sound like them" and that Marquee Moon's title track had changed his "way of thinking about the guitar". Likewise, the singer Lawrence was inspired to form Felt after hearing Marquee Moon, hoping to emulate Verlaine and Lloyd's interlocking guitar parts with bandmate Maurice Deebank.

Writing for Rolling Stone, Rob Sheffield called Marquee Moon "one of the all-time classic guitar albums" whose tremulous guitar twang was an inspiration behind bands such as R.E.M. and Joy Division. Joy Division's Stephen Morris cited it as one of his favorite albums, while R.E.M.'s Michael Stipe said his love of Marquee Moon was "second only to Horses". Will Sergeant said it was also one of his favorite records, and that Verlaine and Lloyd's guitar playing was a major influence on his band Echo & the Bunnymen. Verlaine's jagged, expressive sound on the album made a great impression on Red Hot Chili Peppers guitarist John Frusciante when he started developing as a guitarist in his early 20s. In his words, it reminded him that "none of those things that are happening in the physical dimension mean anything, whether it's what kind of guitar you play or how your amp's set up. It's just ideas, you know, emotion."

== Track listing ==
All songs written by Tom Verlaine, except "Guiding Light" by Verlaine and Richard Lloyd.

Side one
No.	Title	Length
1.	"See No Evil"	3:56
2.	"Venus"	3:48
3.	"Friction"	4:43
4.	"Marquee Moon"	9:58

Side two
No.	Title	Length
1.	"Elevation"	5:08
2.	"Guiding Light"	5:36
3.	"Prove It"	5:04
4.	"Torn Curtain"	7:00

- Sides one and two were combined as tracks 1–8 on CD reissues.
- "Marquee Moon", shortened on the original LP, was restored to its complete recorded length of 10:40 on the 2003 remastered CD.

2003 CD bonus tracks
No.	Title	Length
9.	"Little Johnny Jewel (Parts 1 & 2)"	7:09
10.	"See No Evil" (alternate version)	4:40
11.	"Friction" (alternate version)	4:52
12.	"Marquee Moon" (alternate version)	10:54
13.	Untitled (instrumental)	3:22

== Personnel ==
Credits are adapted from the album's liner notes.

Television

- Billy Ficca – drums
- Richard Lloyd – electric guitar (solo on "See No Evil", "Marquee Moon", "Elevation", and "Guiding Light"), backing vocals
- Fred Smith – bass guitar, backing vocals
- Tom Verlaine – electric guitar (solo on "Venus", "Friction", "Marquee Moon", "Prove It", and "Torn Curtain"), keyboards, lead vocals, production

Additional personnel

- Jim Boyer – assistant engineering
- Greg Calbi – mastering
- Jimmy Douglass – assistant mixing
- Lee Hulko – mastering
- Andy Johns – engineering, mixing, production
- Tony Lane – art direction
- Billy Lobo – back cover artwork
- Robert Mapplethorpe – photography
- Randy Mason – assistant mixing

== Charts ==
Chart performance for Marquee Moon
Chart (1977)	Peak position
Australian Albums Chart	92
UK Albums Chart	28
Swedish Albums Chart	23

== See also ==
- Album era
- List of rock albums
- Timeline of punk rock

== Bibliography ==
- Adams, Chris (2002). Turquoise Days: The Weird World of Echo and the Bunnymen. Soft Skull Press. ISBN 1-887128-89-1.
- Aizlewood, John (November 2003). "Review: Marquee Moon". Q (208). London.
- Anon. (February 1977). "Pop/Rock". High Fidelity.
- Anon. (February 9, 1977). "Review: Marquee Moon". NME. London.
- Anon. (December 24, 1977). "The Sounds 1977 Albums of the Year". Sounds. London.
- Anon. (January 23, 1978). "The 1977 Pazz & Jop Critics Poll". The Village Voice. New York. Archived from the original on March 4, 2013.
- Anon. (December 1982). "Record Reviews". Down Beat. Vol. 49.
- Anon. (April 1989). "The 25 Greatest Albums of All Time". Spin. Vol. 5, no. 1. New York. p. 46 – via Google Books.
- Anon. (September 1992). "Review: Marquee Moon". Select. London.
- Anon. (September 18, 1993). "The Greatest Albums Of The '70s". NME. London.
- Anon. (September 19, 1997). "100 Best Albums Ever". The Guardian. London.
- Anon. (2000). "All Time Top 100 Albums". Melody Maker. London.
- Anon. (March 9, 2001). "Home entertainment: Mark and Lard". The Guardian. London. Archived from the original on February 4, 2014.
- Anon. (May 2002). "100 Best Punk Albums". Q. London.
- Anon. (2003). Marquee Moon (CD reissue booklet). Television. Elektra Records, Rhino Records. R2 73920.
- Anon. (March 2003). "Top 50 Punk Albums". Mojo. London.
- Anon. (March 8, 2003). "NME's 100 Best Albums of All Time!". NME. London.
- Anon. (November 2003). "Review: Marquee Moon". Mojo. London.
- Anon. (November 1, 2003). "128) Marquee Moon". Rolling Stone. New York. Archived from the original on March 31, 2006.
- Anon. (2007). "Marquee Moon". In Irvin, Jim; McLear, Colin (eds.). The Mojo Collection (4th ed.). Canongate Books. ISBN 978-1-84767-643-6.
- Anon. (November 21, 2007). "1000 albums to hear before you die: Artists beginning with T". The Guardian. Archived from the original on September 30, 2013.
- Anon. (May 31, 2012). "500 Greatest Albums of All Time". Rolling Stone.
- Anon. (2015). "Read an Excerpt From Robert Christgau's Memoir 'Going Into the City'". Rolling Stone. New York. Archived from the original on February 21, 2015.
- Anon. (September 22, 2020). "The 500 Greatest Albums of All Time". Rolling Stone.
- Anon. (n.d.). "swedishcharts.com – Television – Marquee Moon". Hung Medien. Archived from the original on May 18, 2014.
- Anon. (n.d.). "Albums and Tracks of the Year for 1977". NME. London. Archived from the original on January 18, 2013.
- Anon. (n.d.). "Elevation by Television". Rolling Stone. New York. Archived from the original on March 25, 2014.
- Bernhard, Brendan (August 3, 2011). "Five Questions With — Bryan Waterman, Author of 'Marquee Moon'". The Local East Village. Archived from the original on May 5, 2014.
- Brown, Pete; Newquist, Harvey P. (1997). Eiche, Jon F. (ed.). Legends of Rock Guitar: The Essential Reference of Rock's Greatest Guitarists. Hal Leonard Corporation. ISBN 0-7935-4042-9.
- Chakroff, Evan (August 1, 2003). "Television – Marquee Moon – On Second Thought". Stylus Magazine. Archived from the original on May 10, 2012.
- Christgau, Robert (March 21, 1977). "Christgau's Consumer Guide". The Village Voice. New York. Archived from the original on October 26, 2012.
- Christgau, Robert (January 23, 1978). "Pazz & Jop 1977: Dean's List". The Village Voice. New York. Archived from the original on March 4, 2013.
- Christgau, Robert (December 17, 1979). "Decade Personal Best: '70s". The Village Voice. New York. Archived from the original on March 25, 2014.
- Christgau, Robert (1981). "Consumer Guide '70s: T". Christgau's Record Guide: Rock Albums of the Seventies. Ticknor & Fields. ISBN 089919026X – via robertchristgau.com.
- Coppage, Noel (March 1977). "Television: Marquee Moon". Stereo Review. Vol. 38, no. 3.
- Dahlen, Chris (December 9, 2013). "Television / Adventure: Marquee Moon / Adventure". Pitchfork. Archived from the original on November 30, 2012.
- Downer, Adam (September 29, 2006). "Review: Television – Marquee Moon". Sputnikmusic.
- Downs, Joan (April 11, 1977). "Television: Marquee Moon". Time. Vol. 109. New York. Music section.
- Erlewine, Stephen Thomas (n.d.). "Marquee Moon – Television". AllMusic. Archived from the original on December 15, 2012.
- Fletcher, Tony (2009). All Hopped Up and Ready to Go: Music from the Streets of New York 1927–77. W. W. Norton & Company. ISBN 978-0-393-33483-8.
- Felt, Hunter (September 22, 2003). "Television: Marquee Moon [remastered edition]". PopMatters. Archived from the original on November 9, 2012.
- Galens, Dave (1996). "Television". In Graff, Gary (ed.). MusicHound Rock: The Essential Album Guide. Visible Ink Press. ISBN 0787610372.
- Gammond, Peter (March 1977). "Records of the Month". Hi-Fi News & Record Review. Vol. 22, no. 3.
- Goldman, Vivien (March 12, 1977). "Review: Marquee Moon". Sounds. London.
- Hegarty, Paul; Halliwell, Martin (2011). Beyond and Before: Progressive Rock since the 1960s. Bloomsbury Publishing USA. ISBN 978-1441114808.
- Heller, Jason (March 9, 2011). "1977". The A.V. Club. Chicago. Archived from the original on November 15, 2012.
- Hewitt, Ben (December 7, 2010). "Bakers Dozen: Joy Division & New Order's Stephen Morris On His Top 13 Albums". The Quietus.
- Heylin, Clinton (2005). From the Velvets to the Voidoids: The Birth of American Punk Rock. Chicago Review Press. ISBN 1-55652-575-3.
- Hoskyns, Barney (January 2004). "Television: Marquee Moon (Expanded); Adventure (Expanded) (Rhino)". Uncut. London.
- Hull, Tom (October 8, 2003). "October 2003 Notebook". Tom Hull – on the Web.
- Hunter, Nigel (July 1977). "Rock Albums". Gramophone. Vol. 55, no. 650. London.
- Jacobson, Abbi (2018). I Might Regret This: Essays, Drawings, Vulnerabilities, and Other Stuff. Grand Central Publishing. ISBN 978-1538713280.
- Kent, David (1993b). Australian Chart Book 1970–1992 (illustrated ed.). St Ives, N.S.W.: Australian Chart Book. ISBN 0-646-11917-6.
- Kent, Nick (1993a). "I Have Seen the Future ...". In Heylin, Clinton (ed.). The Da Capo Book of Rock & Roll Writing. Da Capo Press. ISBN 0-306-80920-6.
- Kot, Greg (October 5, 2003). "Television Marquee Moon Adventure (Elektra/Rhino ..." Chicago Tribune. Archived from the original on April 27, 2014.
- Larkin, Colin (1994). Guinness Book of Top 1000 Albums (1st ed.). Gullane Children's Books. ISBN 978-0-85112-786-6.
- Larkin, Colin, ed. (2000). All Time Top 1000 Albums (3rd ed.). Virgin Books. ISBN 0-7535-0493-6.
- Martin, Mike (2003). "Television". In Buckley, Peter (ed.). The Rough Guide to Rock (2nd ed.). Rough Guides. ISBN 1-85828-457-0.
- McCutchen, Andrew (2000). "Sonic Youth: An interview with Thurston Moore". Spike Magazine. Archived from the original on April 17, 2017.
- Milner, Greg (March 2004). "Michael Stipe". Spin. New York – via Google Books.
- Moon, Tom (2008). 1,000 Recordings to Hear Before You Die. Workman Publishing. ISBN 978-0-7611-3963-8.
- Pattenden, Mike (January 2, 2010). "The Edge on guitarists, Glasbonbury and musicals". The Times. London. (subscription required)
- Pitchfork Staff (June 23, 2004). "Staff Lists: Top 100 Albums of the 1970s". Pitchfork. Archived from the original on November 13, 2012.
- Schinder, Scott; Schwartz, Andy (2008). Icons of Rock: An Encyclopedia of the Legends who Changed Music Forever. Greenwood Icons. Vol. 2. Greenwood Publishing Group. ISBN 978-0-313-33847-2.
- Sheffield, Rob (October 16, 2003). "Review: Marquee Moon". Rolling Stone. New York.
- Simpson, Dave (November 17, 2013). "Television – review". The Guardian. London. Main section. Archived from the original on April 28, 2014.
- Tiven, Jon (March 1977). "Record Reviews". Audio.
- Todd, David (2012). Feeding Back. Chicago Review Press. ISBN 978-1-61374-062-0.
- Tucker, Ken (April 7, 1977). "Marquee Moon". Rolling Stone. New York. Archived from the original on June 14, 2013.
- Tuffrey, Laurie (2014). "Planets Of Sound: Joey Santiago Of Pixies' Favourite Albums". The Quietus.
- Waterman, Bryan (2011). Television's Marquee Moon. 33⅓. Vol. 83. Bloomsbury Academic. ISBN 978-1-4411-8605-8.
- Weingarten, Mark (September 26, 2003). "Adventure; Marquee Moon Review". Entertainment Weekly. No. 730. New York.
- Weisbard, Eric; Marks, Craig, eds. (1995). "Television". Spin Alternative Record Guide. New York: Vintage Books. ISBN 0-679-75574-8.
- Wilcox, Tyler (2017). "Television's Punk Epic 'Marquee Moon,' 40 Years Later". Pitchfork.
- Woodhouse, Alan (August 3, 2012). "Most Important Albums Of NME's Lifetime – Television, 'Marquee Moon'". NME. London. Archived from the original on February 24, 2014.
