= Pixies (EP) =

EP by Pixies
- Released: July 9, 2002
- Recorded: March 1987
- Studios: Fort Apache, Boston
- Genre: Alternative rock
- Length: 16:30
- Label: SpinART
- Producer: Gary Smith

Pixies chronology
Trompe le Monde (1991)	Pixies (2002)	EP1 (2013)

Professional ratings
Review scores
Source	Rating
AllMusic	3.5/5 stars
Blender	3/5 stars
NME	2.5/5 stars
Pitchfork	6.4/10
Robert Christgau	A−
Rolling Stone	3/5 stars
The Rolling Stone Album Guide	3/5 stars

Pixies, also known as Demos or Demos (The Purple Tape '87) in reissues, is an EP by the American alternative rock band of the same name, released in 2002 by SpinART Records in the U.S., Cooking Vinyl in the UK and Sonic Unyon in Canada. It consists of the remaining songs from the band's original 17-track demo tape (known informally as The Purple Tape), eight songs of which were released in 1987 as the band's debut, Come On Pilgrim. All 17 songs were recorded by Gary Smith at Fort Apache Studios in March 1987.

"In Heaven (Lady in the Radiator Song)" is a cover of a song featured in David Lynch's 1977 film Eraserhead.

== Track listing ==
All songs written by Black Francis, except "In Heaven", by Peter Ivers and David Lynch.

1. "Broken Face" – 1:23
2. "Build High" – 1:41
3. "Rock a My Soul" – 1:40
4. "Down to the Well" – 2:36
5. "Break My Body" – 2:00
6. "I'm Amazed" – 1:40
7. "Here Comes Your Man" – 2:50
8. "Subbacultcha" – 2:52
9. "In Heaven (Lady in the Radiator Song)" – 1:43

== The Purple Tape ==
The Purple Tape was recorded in three days during the band's first studio session in 1987. According to frontman Black Francis, the tape was initially recorded "with the intention of releasing it as a record", and producer Gary Smith later stated that the songs were not thought of as demo recordings. The sessions were financed by Francis after borrowing $1,000 from his father (approx $2,760 in 2024).

=== Track listing ===
Side one

1. "Levitate Me" – 2:30 †
2. "The Holiday Song" – 2:08 †
3. "I've Been Tired" – 2:36 †
4. "Break My Body" – 2:00
5. "Down to the Well" – 2:36
6. "Rock a My Soul" – 1:40
7. "I'm Amazed" – 1:40
8. "Build High" – 1:41
9. "In Heaven (Lady in the Radiator Song)" – 1:43

Side two

1. "Caribou" – 3:17 †
2. "Here Comes Your Man" – 2:50
3. "Subbacultcha" – 2:52
4. "Vamos" – 3:10 †
5. "Broken Face" – 1:23
6. "Nimrod's Son" – 2:15 †
7. "Isla De Encanta" – 1:42 †
8. "Ed Is Dead" – 2:32 †

† = Appeared on the band's debut EP, Come On Pilgrim (1987).

=== Songs ===
The recordings were captured on two reels of tape and included two different takes of "Rock a My Soul", as well as unspecified recordings labeled "Leonard Norman acoustic number" and "The New One".

"Down to the Well" and "Rock a My Soul" from this session were re-released in 1988 on the Sounds Waves 3 EP, a 7-inch, 33 1/3 rpm record that also included tracks by the Wedding Present, the Pogues and the Sugarcubes which was given away with issues of Sounds magazine.

Several of the tracks on the tape were re-recorded for later Pixies releases: "I'm Amazed", "Broken Face", and "Break My Body" (for Surfer Rosa); "Here Comes Your Man" (Doolittle); a live version of "In Heaven" ("Gigantic" single); "Down to the Well" (Bossanova); "Build High" ("Planet of Sound" single); and a revised "Subbacultcha" (Trompe le Monde).

The original "Subbacultcha" and "I'm Amazed" both have sections that differ from later re-recordings. The removed chorus from "Subbacultcha" later appeared as the basis for "Distance Equals Rate Times Time", a separate song immediately following the revised "Subbacultcha" on Trompe le Monde.

=== Artwork ===
The cassette J-card features a photograph taken by producer Gary Smith of drummer David Lovering jogging naked in place at Fort Apache, composited with an image of project houses behind the studio.

== Personnel ==
Pixies

- Black Francis – vocals, guitar
- David Lovering – drums
- Kim Deal – bass, vocals
- Joey Santiago – lead guitar

Technical

- Gary Smith – producer, original cassette design
- Paul Q. Kolderie – engineer
- Steve Hoffman – mastering
- Andrew Swainson – design
