= Prove It (Television song) =

Single by Television

from the album Marquee Moon
- B-side: "Venus"
- Released: July 22, 1977
- Recorded: A & R Studios, NYC
- Genre: New wave
- Length: 5:05
- Label: Elektra
- Songwriter: Tom Verlaine
- Producers: Andy Johns, Tom Verlaine

Television singles chronology
"Marquee Moon" (1977)	"Prove It" (1977)	"Foxhole" (1978)

"Prove It" is a song by American rock band Television. It was released as the second single from their 1977 debut album, Marquee Moon. NME ranked it 40th on the magazine's year-end list of the best singles from 1977.

== Background ==
Like its preceding single, "Prove It" was a staple of Television's early live shows, often as a set closer. The lyrics relate to a detective story.

== Release ==
In the United Kingdom, "Prove It" was released as a single on July 22, 1977. The first 15,000 copies were pressed on light green vinyl, and the next 15,000 were in dark green vinyl. The single charted for four weeks and peaked at number 25 on the UK Singles Chart on July 30, 1977.

== Personnel ==
Credits are adapted from the album's liner notes.

- Tom Verlaine – vocals, guitar solo
- Richard Lloyd – guitar
- Billy Ficca – drums
- Fred Smith – bass
