= Come On Pilgrim =

1987 EP by Pixies

Studio album (mini album) by Pixies
- Released: September 28, 1987
- Recorded: March 1987
- Studios: Fort Apache; Roxbury, Boston, Massachusetts
- Genres: Alternative rock; pop punk
- Length: 20:29
- Label: 4AD
- Producer: Gary Smith

Pixies chronology
Pixies (1987)	Come On Pilgrim (1987)	Surfer Rosa (1988)

Come On Pilgrim is the debut mini-album by the American alternative rock band Pixies, released on September 28, 1987, on 4AD. Produced by Gary Smith, the release consists of eight tracks from a seventeen-song recording session that the band had tracked at Fort Apache Studios in March 1987.

Signing the band based on the quality of the recordings, 4AD founder Ivo Watts-Russell whittled its track listing down to eight songs, remixing them to become Come On Pilgrim. The remaining nine songs were subsequently released in 2002 as Pixies.

== Background ==
In March 1987, Pixies entered Boston's Fort Apache Studios with Fort Apache owner/record producer Gary Smith to record a demo tape. The resulting 17-song cassette, later dubbed "The Purple Tape", eventually found its way to Ivo Watts-Russell, president and co-founder of the influential British record label 4AD. Pixies' manager Ken Goes was also the manager of Throwing Muses, who had become the first American band to sign to 4AD a year earlier. Goes passed Pixies' demo tape on to Watts-Russell, who walked the streets of New York listening to it on his Walkman and "absolutely adored it from day one". Despite initial hesitance to sign the band, seeing as how 4AD had already signed an American band from the same manager, he was convinced to do so by his girlfriend, Deborah Edgeley, a secretary for 4AD.

According to frontman Black Francis, the Purple Tape was recorded "with the intention of releasing it as a record." However, Watts-Russell felt that "there was too much that was just not that good" and insisted on choosing only eight of the 17 songs for release. "I felt that those eight songs were a bang in the face, left you wanting more, and I thought that the recorded versions of the other songs that were on the Purple Tape were not that great." Original session producer Gary Smith differed, thinking the songs "should all be served up at once because that's how you would get a sense of how colossally important this band was." Watts-Russell intentionally chose not to include "Here Comes Your Man", feeling it was "too obviously commercial".

Expressing regret that some other previous 4AD debuts had failed to live up to the power of their demo versions, Watts-Russell decided to slightly remix the eight Purple Tape songs for release, rather than have the band re-record the songs. Pixies re-recorded eight of the nine remaining Purple Tape tracks for later albums and EP releases, the sole exception being "Rock a My Soul". This, along with the rest of the nine "missing" Purple Tape tracks, were released as Pixies in 2002.

== Artwork and packaging ==
The title of the album is derived from "Watch What You're Doing", a song by Christian rock singer Larry Norman, that includes the line, "C'mon pilgrim, you know he loves you", which the Pixies quote in the song "Levitate Me". Of Norman, Francis said, "when I was 14 I really dug him. I dressed like him, I looked like him, he was my total idol."

The artwork was conceived by Vaughan Oliver, with photography from Simon Larbalestier. The man in the "hair shirt" on the cover was a friend of Larbalestier's and the photograph was from a series of works Larbalestier was making based on The Temptation of Saint Anthony by Gustave Flaubert.

== Composition ==
=== Music ===
Come On Pilgrim showcased much of Pixies' variety and set up the beginnings of many trends in their music. It displayed Joey Santiago's innovative guitar leads, Kim Deal's sunny vocal harmonies, and Black Francis's vocal range, which varied from screaming to traditionally sung melodies. A version of the song "Vamos" would appear on Pixies' next two releases: re-recorded with Steve Albini for their first full-length album, Surfer Rosa, and as a live B-side on their first single, "Gigantic".

Reflecting on Come On Pilgrim in 2022, Black Francis noted: "I was listening to Murmur by R.E.M. a lot just before Come on Pilgrim and that was hugely influential on me as a songwriter. I'm going to be cocky and say: we were even better than Murmur."

=== Lyrics ===
Come On Pilgrim includes two songs partly sung in Spanish ("Vamos" and "Isla de Encanta"), which drew upon some of Francis's experiences in Puerto Rico. (Isla de Encanta is an alteration of the island's nickname, Isla del Encanto, meaning "isle of enchantment".) Two songs explicitly mention incest: "Nimrod's Son" and "The Holiday Song". "I've Been Tired" refers metaphorically to sex and rock & roll culture, and there are four songs with overt religious references or language ("Caribou", "Nimrod's Son", "The Holiday Song" and "Levitate Me"). "Caribou" is about reincarnation. "Ed Is Dead" is about a brain-damaged girl known to Francis who rode a bicycle with a transistor radio strapped to its handlebars, so she could play music.

== Release ==
The original 1987 UK release of Come On Pilgrim entered the UK indie album chart on October 24, 1987, spending 29 weeks on the chart and peaking at number 5. The album received far more attention from the music press in the UK than in the United States, and was reviewed in Q Magazine, Sounds and NME.

The album failed to secure distribution in the United States when it was first released and was first issued in the U.S. in August 1988, when Rough Trade included it on their CD release of the band's first full-length album, Surfer Rosa. At the same time, the two releases were issued on separate vinyl records by Rough Trade. That same month, 4AD also released Surfer Rosa and Come On Pilgrim on CD together in the UK. This has been the standard UK CD release ever since, only being out of print for about six months in 1998. Subsequent U.S. CD releases have split them in two.

In 1992, Elektra Records issued Come On Pilgrim and Surfer Rosa on separate CDs in the U.S. After 4AD re-acquired the band's US distribution rights in 2004, they were again released on CD separately; this version of Come On Pilgrim was the first CD release to carry the 4AD catalogue number (MAD 709).

== Reception ==
Professional ratings
Review scores
Source	Rating
AllMusic	4.5/5 stars
Blender	4/5 stars
Pitchfork	8.3/10
The Rolling Stone Album Guide	3.5/5 stars
Spin	B+
Spin Alternative Record Guide	7/10
Uncut	4/5 stars

Come On Pilgrim was well received by critics.

Heather Phares writing for AllMusic, praised the release for introducing the band's "spooky, theatrical vision" and Black Francis' "lyrical fetishes for sex, death, and religion and his twisted sense of humor crop up on every track, from the eerie opener "Caribou," which urges listeners to "Reeeeepent!," to the final song, "Levitate Me,". He also praised the album's "less-is-more" production finding it to give "the full, primal impact of the band's combustive sound to blast through, offering what may be the purest version of their perverse punk-pop". Greg Milner of Spin gave the album a B+ saying "[t]he band may sound tentative, but the building blocks are here" and concluded that it demonstrated "the soft/loud song structures that were the then-future sound of alternative rock"

Jon Dolan of Blender observed "their debut EP made them college-radio heroes in the U.S. and underground rock stars in England." and called "Caribou" "one of the band's most "elegiac songs" which "detours into some Pixies en Español freak-outs and ends with "Levitate Me," a plea for either transcendence, vehicular homicide or both."

== Track listing ==
All tracks are written by Black Francis, except where noted.

Side one
No.	Title	Length
1.	"Caribou"	3:14
2.	"Vamos"	2:53
3.	"Isla De Encanta"	1:41
4.	"Ed Is Dead"	2:30

Side two
No.	Title	Writer(s)	Length
5.	"The Holiday Song"		2:14
6.	"Nimrod's Son"		2:17
7.	"I've Been Tired"		3:01
8.	"Levitate Me"	Francis, David Lovering, Jean Walsh	2:37
Total length:			20:29

== Personnel ==
Pixies

- Black Francis – vocals, guitars
- David Lovering – drums
- Kim Deal – bass guitar, vocals (credited as "Mrs. John Murphy")
- Joey Santiago – lead guitars

Technical

- Gary Smith – producer
- Paul Q. Kolderie – engineer
- Vaughan Oliver – art direction, design
- Simon Larbalestier – photography
- Jack Adams – mastering

== Charts ==
Chart (1987)	Peak position
UK Indie Chart	5

== Certifications and sales ==
Region	Certification	Certified units/sales
United Kingdom (BPI) for Surfer Rosa/Come On Pilgrim 1993 release	Gold	100,000^{^}
United States	—	198,000
^{^} Shipments figures based on certification alone.
