= Eh...Keras Tu! =

Studio album by Teacher's Pet
- Released: April 11, 1994
- Recorded: 1992–1994
- Studio: Boss Studio
- Genres: Pop rock; folk rock
- Length: 45:09
- Language: Malay
- Label: Warner Music Malaysia
- Producer: Shanazron

Teacher's Pet chronology
Eh...Keras Tu! (1994)	Di Suatu Hari, Di Suatu Waktu (1995)

Singles from Eh...Keras Tu!
- 1. "Warisan Wanita Terakhir" Released: 1994

Eh...Keras Tu! (Eh...That’s Hard!) is the debut studio album by Singaporean rock band Teacher's Pet. It was released on 11 April 1994 by Warner Music Malaysia. The album includes the band's hit single "Warisan Wanita Terakhir".

== Background ==
Teacher's Pet was formed in 1992 in Singapore as a duo consisting of vocalist Maman and guitarist Addy. Before forming the band, Maman was the vocalist for several local rock bands, including Flying Funeral and Try.

Following dissatisfaction with his earlier experiences in the music industry, including limited promotion and unpaid royalties for his previous band's album, he began learning more about the music business, including how to produce albums and plan marketing strategies, from established musicians such as M. Nasir and Ramli Sarip.

Following that, Maman founded an independent music production company, Legend Productions, and began developing material for Teacher's Pet debut album. The album was financed independently using his savings and income from his work as a despatch rider.

== Recording and production ==
=== Recording ===
In 1992, the band began recording a demo at Boss Studio, with Shanazron serving as producer. The band's lineup consisted of Maman (vocals and guitar), Addy (guitar), Jaybon (bass), and Salleh (drums), while Ang from rock band Varna played drums during the early sessions. The band submitted the demo, which included "Warisan Wanita Terakhir", to several record labels, but it was rejected.

In late 1993, Warner Music Malaysia heard the band's demo.The record label subsequently signed the band and released the album in 1994. According to Johari Ibrahim, promotions manager of Warner Music Singapore, the album was released through the label's Malaysian branch due to its larger market reach.

=== Music ===
Eh...Keras Tu! incorporates elements of pop rock, folk rock, soft rock, rock and roll, and rhythm and blues.According to Maman, the album emphasized a Western-influenced rock sound based largely on major chords. Songwriters involved include Shanazron, Maman, Addy, Jaybon, and Bob.

=== Cover ===
The album's cover concept and design were created by Jalil, while photography was done by Den Esbegos. The title Eh...Keras Tu! (Eh...That’s Hard!) was derived from a slang expression meaning "bad" or "tough", reflecting the band's belief that they were "bad" enough to pursue music as a full-time career.

== Release and commercial reception ==
Eh...Keras Tu! was released on 11 April 1994 through Warner Music Malaysia. The album sold over 20,000 copies within two weeks. By late May 1994, it had sold over 30,000 copies. In 1995, the album was released for the Indonesian market under the title "Ku ingin Memiliki" by Musica Studios.

== Promotion ==
In April 1994, Warner Music Malaysia released a newspaper advertisement stating: "With their hit, Warisan Wanita Terakhir, history has been made by breaking sales of Ella's album." The advertisement claimed that Teacher's Pet had sold 295,000 copies of the album in a single day. The claim was later revealed to be an April Fool's joke.

Teacher's Pet supported the album with a concert tour sponsored by Lee Cooper, which began at the Life Centre in Kuala Lumpur on 14 May 1994 before expanding into a 14-city tour across Malaysia. The opening concert reportedly attracted over 2,000 attendees.

== Critical reception ==
A reviewer in The New Paper described Teacher's Pet as sounding somewhat like Aerosmith, Guns N' Roses, and U2 combined.

== Track listing ==
No.	Title	Writer(s)	Length
1.	"501"	Addy; Shanazron; Maman	3:24
2.	"Warisan Wanita Terakhir"	Shanazron	3:30
3.	"Dakapkanku Ke Syurga"	Shanazron; Bob	5:12
4.	"Talipon Punya Pasal"	Shanazron	3:20
5.	"Eh...Keras Tu"	Addy; Bob	1:16
6.	"Malas"	Bob	5:04
7.	"Kubuktikan Segalanya"	Maman	4:45
8.	"Warna Hidupku"	Maman; Shanazron	4:38
9.	"Kibarkan"	Shanazron	5:15
10.	"Meruntuh Harapan"	Jaybon	5:15
11.	"Warisan Wanita Terakhir (Acoustic Version)"	Shanazron	3:30
Total length:			45:09

== Personnel ==
Credits are adapted from the liner notes of Eh...Keras Tu!.

- Maman – lead vocals, guitar, recording
- Addy – arranger, guitar
- Jaybon – arranger, recording, bass
- Salleh – drums
- Farouk – recording, mixing
- Shanazron – arranger, recording, mixing, producer

== Accolades ==
Award(s)	Year	Recipient(s)	Nominated work(s)	Category	Result	Ref(s)
Anugerah Industri Muzik	1995	Teacher's Pet		Best New Artiste (Group)	Nominated	
Anugerah Industri Muzik	1995	Teacher's Pet	Eh...Keras Tu!	Best Vocal Performance (Group)	Nominated	

== Certifications ==
Region	Certification	Certified units/sales
Malaysia	Platinum	30,000
^{*} Sales figures based on certification alone.^{^} Shipments figures based on certification alone.

== Release history ==
Region	Release date	Edition(s)	Format(s)	Label(s)
Malaysia	11 April 1994	Standard edition	CD, Cassette	Warner Music Malaysia
Indonesia	1995	Standard edition	CD, Cassette	Musica Studios
