= Surfer Rosa =

1988 studio album by Pixies

Studio album by Pixies
- Released: March 21, 1988
- Recorded: November–December 1987
- Studios: Downtown Recorders (Boston); Q Division (Somerville)
- Genres: Rock; indie rock; art punk; grunge
- Length: 33:21
- Label: 4AD
- Producer: Steve Albini

Pixies chronology
| Come On Pilgrim (1987) | Surfer Rosa (1988) | Doolittle (1989) |

Singles from Surfer Rosa
- 1. "Gigantic" / "River Euphrates" Released: August 29, 1988

Surfer Rosa is the debut studio album (Note: The Pixies' previous release, Come On Pilgrim, was an EP rather than a full album.) by the American alternative rock band Pixies, released in March 1988 on the British label 4AD. It was produced by Steve Albini. Surfer Rosa contains many of the elements of the Pixies' earlier output, including Spanish lyrics and references to Puerto Rico. It includes references to mutilation and incest alongside experimental recording techniques and a distinctive drum sound.

As 4AD was an independent label, distribution in the United States was handled by British label Rough Trade Records; however, it failed to chart in either country. Only one single was released, a rerecorded version of "Gigantic", and reached number 93 on the UK Singles Chart. Surfer Rosa was rereleased in the US by Elektra Records in 1992, and in 2005 was certified gold by the Recording Industry Association of America.

Surfer Rosa is often included on critics' lists of the best rock albums. Alternative rock artists including Billy Corgan and PJ Harvey have cited it as an inspiration; it was an influence on Nirvana's 1993 album In Utero, which Albini also produced.

== Background ==
Before the release of Pixies' debut mini-album Come On Pilgrim in October 1987, Ivo Watts-Russell, head of 4AD, suggested they return to the studio to record a full-length album. The original plan was to record new material at Fort Apache Studios, where the band had produced The Purple Tape and Come On Pilgrim. However, due to differences between the band's manager Ken Goes and The Purple Tape producer Gary Smith, Pixies ended up looking for a new producer and recording studio. On the advice of a 4AD colleague, Watts-Russell looked to hire Steve Albini as the record's engineer and producer. Having sent a pre-release tape of Come On Pilgrim to Albini, Goes invited him to a Boston dinner party at drummer David Lovering's house a few weeks after Come On Pilgrim's release.

Albini met the band that evening, and they discussed how the next record should sound and be recorded. Albini said that "[the band and I] were in the studio the next day." Paul Q. Kolderie, who had worked at Fort Apache Studios with Smith, recommended the Boston recording studio Q Division to Albini. This created tension between Smith and Kolderie, and Kolderie later remarked that "Gary almost killed me for the suggestion; he thought I was scheming to get the project." Albini later noted that the Pixies were unusual among his early recording projects, as he had no prior personal relationship with the band and had previously worked mainly with musicians within his immediate circle.

== Recording and production ==
Pixies entered Q Division in December 1987, booking ten working days of studio time in which to record the album. 4AD allocated Pixies a budget of US$10,000, with the total costs amounting to about $18,000. Albini's producer's fee was US$1,500, and he received no royalties; Albini had a practice of refusing royalties from records he produced, viewing it as "an insult to the band." Along with Albini in the studio, Q Division's Jon Lupfer acted as studio assistant.

Albini later recalled that the band entered the studio well-rehearsed and "in great shape to make a record". He described the studio as relatively modest, with a 16-track setup and limited outboard equipment, but noted that its live room had a "lively and boomy" acoustic character with strong low-end resonance, which was well-suited for recording drums. To manage instrument bleed, amplifiers were initially placed in a corridor, though Albini found the sound there lacking; he instead suggested isolating larger amplifiers in a tiled bathroom to achieve a more ambient guitar sound. He also used a PZM microphone mounted on the studio wall to capture ambient room sound, contributing to the album's spacious and live-sounding drum production.

The recording process took the full booked period of ten working days, with extra vocal mixes subsequently added in the studio. Albini planned to mix the record "somewhere else", but according to Lupfer, "He was unhappy there with it."

=== Albini's recording techniques ===
During Kim Deal's vocal takes during "Where Is My Mind?" and "Gigantic", Albini moved the equipment to record into a studio bathroom to achieve more "roomy" echo. John Murphy, Deal's then husband, said, "Albini didn't like the studio sound". Albini later said that the record could have been completed in a week, but "we ended up trying more experimental stuff basically to kill time and see if anything good materialized." An example was "Something Against You", where Albini filtered Black Francis' voice through a guitar amp for "a totally ragged, vicious texture."

=== Studio banter ===
The recording of a conversation held between Francis and Albini can be heard at the end of "Oh My Golly!". Lupfer writes that "it was a concept he [Albini] was going for to get some studio banter." As Deal was leaving the studio to smoke a cigarette, she exclaimed "If anybody touches my stuff, I'll kill ya." Francis replied with "I'll kill you, you fucking die, if anybody touches my stuff". The track begins at this point, with Francis explaining the conversation to Albini, whose voice is not heard on the track. Lupfer later admitted that Albini knew "perfectly well what was going on."

"I'm Amazed" begins with Deal recounting a story in which one of her former teachers who was "into field hockey players" was discreetly fired. Francis finishes Deal's sentences, joking that her response to hearing of the teacher's activities was to try to join the team. Albini later observed the use of studio banter on Surfer Rosa: "It's on their record forever so I think now they are obliged to say that they're ok with it, but I honestly don't know that that idea would've ever come up if I hadn't done it. There are times when things like that are revealing and entertaining and I kind of felt it was a bit gimmicky on this record." He also later expressed discomfort with certain production choices, including the use of transitions between tracks, which he felt reflected a level of creative involvement he would later avoid.

== Music ==
"Something Against You"
The third track of Surfer Rosa. This sample contains part of the chorus, with Francis' distorted screaming and a repeated guitar rhythm prominent.

"Where Is My Mind?"
The seventh track of Surfer Rosa. This sample contains the end of the third verse and part of the chorus. Santiago's erratic lead guitar plays a key part in the song's melody.

Surfer Rosa is widely characterized as a rock album. Spin contributor, Greg Milner, placed it, genre-wise, between British post-punk and American indie rock. It displays a mix of musical styles, balancing "blazing piece of punk" with "softer, poppier" tracks such as "Where Is My Mind?" and humorous tracks such as "Tony's Theme" and "Bone Machine". Mike Powell (Pitchfork) opined that many of its songs feel intentionally unfinished or "regurgitated in half-digested form"—with verses that last longer than typical, choruses that repeat uneven numbers of times, and "abrupt shifts in tone and volume". NME contributor, Mark Sinker, remarked that an unprecedented degree of "lazy evil" is injected into the record. Moreover, Mark Beaumont (NME) highlighted album's "truly menacing" mix of "pop-minded" sounds and "gruesome sonic and lyrical landscapes", illustrated by the songs like "Cactus", "Bone Machine" and "River Euphrates".

Surfer Rosa's lyrical content was inspired partly by Francis' love for the surrealist movies of Luis Buñuel and David Lynch's Eraserhead, which depict violence not as a literal dynamic but a metaphor for the tumultuous inner worlds that can be hidden but never fully controlled. This theme is exemplified by a love ballad "Cactus", where narrator begs his girlfriend to smear her dress with blood from a cactus cut and mail the dress to him. "Break My Body" and "Broken Face" include facetious references to mutilation and incest. Francis switches to Spanish and references Puerto Rico on the tracks "Oh My Golly!" and "Vamos". "Gigantic" is about an illicit love affair and borrows story elements from the 1986 film Crimes of the Heart, in which a married woman falls in love with a teenager. Francis was inspired to write "Where Is My Mind?" after scuba diving in the Caribbean.

== Packaging ==
"Surfer Rosa#2" from the album's cover booklet

Surfer Rosa's cover artwork features a photograph of Isabel Tamen, a Portuguese dancer and friend of photographer Simon Larbalestier, posing topless as a flamenco dancer against a wall displaying a crucifix and a torn poster for the 1983 Spanish film Carmen. Larbalestier, who contributed pictures to all Pixies album sleeves, decided to build the set because "we couldn't find the atmosphere we wanted naturally." According to Larbalestier, Black Francis came up with the idea for the cover as he wrote songs in his father's "topless Spanish bar"; Larbalestier added the crucifix and torn poster, and they "sort of loaded that with all the Catholicism." Commenting on the cover in 2005, Francis said, "I just hope people find it tasteful." The cover booklet expands on the theme and features photographs of the flamenco dancer in several other poses; there are no song lyrics or written content, apart from album credits, in the booklet.

The booklet's photographs were taken in one day at a pub opposite the 4AD offices, because, according to Larbalestier, "it was one of the few places that had a raised stage". In a 1988 interview with Joy Press, Francis described the concept as referring to "a surfer girl," who "walks along the beach of Piñones, has a surfboard, very beautiful." When questioned about the topless element, he replied, "For the first record, I told them I liked nudity. I like body lines—not necessarily something in bad taste, didn't even have to be female, just body lines ... like that Obsession ad, you know?" According to Melody Maker, the album was originally entitled "Gigantic" after Deal's song, but the band feared misinterpretation of the cover and changed it to "Surfer Rosa."

== Release ==
Surfer Rosa was released in the UK by 4AD on March 21, 1988. It entered the UK Indie Chart the following week, spending 60 weeks on the chart, peaking at number 2. Until August of that year it was only available in the US as an import. Although the label held worldwide distribution rights to Pixies, they did not have access to a distributor outside the UK. When 4AD signed a distribution deal with Rough Trade's US branch, the album was released on vinyl and cassette as part of the Surfer Rosa/Come On Pilgrim release. While Surfer Rosa/Come On Pilgrim has remained in print on CD in the UK, subsequent US releases have seen the two released on separate CDs. These separate releases first appeared in January 1992, when Elektra Records first reissued the band's first two albums. After 4AD reacquired rights to the band's US distribution, they released both as separate CDs. Surfer Rosa was certified gold by the Recording Industry Association of America in 2005, 17 years after its original release.

"Gigantic" was the only single taken from Surfer Rosa, released on August 29, 1988. The track and its B-side, "River Euphrates", were rerecorded by Gil Norton at Blackwing Studios in London, early in May 1988. The remixed single was well met by critics. The single failed to sell, and spent just one week at number 93 on the UK Singles Chart. Despite the poor commercial performance of both Surfer Rosa and "Gigantic", Ivo Watts-Russell has said that the response to the album was "times five" compared with Come On Pilgrim.

== Critical reception ==
Professional ratings
Review scores
| Source | Rating |
|---|---|
| AllMusic | 5/5 stars |
| Blender | 5/5 stars |
| Mojo | 5/5 stars |
| NME | 9.5/10 |
| Pitchfork | 10/10 |
| The Rolling Stone Album Guide | 5/5 stars |
| Sounds | 4/5 stars |
| Spin | A+ |
| Spin Alternative Record Guide | 10/10 |
| The Village Voice | B |

UK music press reviews of Surfer Rosa were generally positive. Q's Ian Cranna wrote that "what sets the Pixies apart are their sudden bursts of memorable pop melody," and noted that "they could have a bright future ahead of them." NME's Mark Sinker, reviewing the album in March 1988, said "they force the past to sound like them", while Dave Henderson from Underground magazine found the songs "well crafted, well delivered sketches which embrace commercial ideals as well as bizarre left-field out of control moments". John Dougan of American music magazine Spin described it as "beautifully brutal", and the magazine later named Pixies their musicians of the year. In a less enthusiastic contemporary review for The Village Voice, Robert Christgau found the band's guitar riffs recognizable and their strong rhythms unique, but felt they had been overrated by critics who hailed them as "the Amerindie find of the year". In a 2003 review of the Pixies' 2002 self-titled EP, Christgau wrote that while he initially found Francis' fey and philosophically limited lyrics somewhat annoying, Surfer Rosa now seemed "audaciously funny and musically prophetic".

At the end of 1988, Surfer Rosa was named one of the year's best albums on English critics' year-end lists. Independent music magazines Melody Maker and Sounds named Surfer Rosa as their album of the year; NME and Record Mirror placed the album 10th and 14th, respectively. As of 2015, sales in the United States have exceeded 705,000 copies, according to Nielsen SoundScan.

== Legacy ==
Both Surfer Rosa and Steve Albini's production of the album have been influential on alternative rock, and on grunge in particular. Nirvana's Kurt Cobain cited Surfer Rosa as the basis for Nevermind's songwriting. When he first heard the album, Cobain discovered a template for the mix of heavy noise and pop he was aiming to achieve. He remarked in 1992 that he "heard songs off of Surfer Rosa that I'd written but threw out because I was too afraid to play them for anybody." Cobain listed Surfer Rosa as one of the top 50 albums he thought were most influential to Nirvana's sound in his journal in 1993. Cobain hired Albini to produce Nirvana's 1993 album In Utero, primarily due to his contribution to Surfer Rosa.

The Smashing Pumpkins' Billy Corgan described Surfer Rosa as "the one that made me go, 'holy shit'. It was so fresh. It rocked without being lame." Corgan was impressed by the album's drum sound, and acknowledged that the Smashing Pumpkins used to study the record for its technical elements. Nada Surf have also cited the album as an influence. Musician PJ Harvey said that Surfer Rosa "blew my mind", and that she "immediately went to track down Steve Albini." Dinosaur Jr.'s J Mascis, comparing the record to the later Pixies albums Bossanova and Trompe le Monde, said he thought that Albini's production "sounded way better than the other ones".

Ivo Watts-Russell recalled: "I remember when I first heard Surfer Rosa thinking, 'I didn't know the Pixies could sound like the Fall.' That was my immediate reaction, in other words, incredibly raw." Gary Smith, who at the time was in a disagreement with the band, admitted he "was really happy that they had made such a forceful, aggressive, record."

In 1991, as Pixies were recording Trompe le Monde, Albini told the fan magazine Forced Exposure that Surfer Rosa was "a patchwork pinch loaf from a band who at their top dollar best are blandly entertaining college rock", and said of the band: "Their willingness to be 'guided' by their manager, their record company and their producers is unparalleled. Never have I seen four cows more anxious to be led around by their nose rings." In 2005, Albini apologized for the remarks, saying: "To this day I regret having done it. I don't think that I regarded the band as significantly as I should have." In 2023, he said Surfer Rosa was "a better record than he thought it was at the time".

In an interview for the Life of the Record podcast, Albini went on to say, "I wrote some rather glib and unflattering things about [the Pixies taking all of his suggestions without question] in a fanzine in the immediate aftermath of that record, and I'm ashamed of the way I treated them. They didn't deserve that."

=== Accolades ===
Accolades for Surfer Rosa
| Publication | Country | Accolade | Year | Rank |
|---|---|---|---|---|
| Mojo | UK | Mojo 1000, the Ultimate CD Buyers guide | 2001 | * |
| Musik Express | Germany | The 50 Best Albums from the 80s | 2003 | 2 |
| Pitchfork | US | Top 100 Albums of the 1980s | 2002 | 7 |
| Q | UK | The 50 Heaviest Albums of All Time | 2001 | * |
| Rolling Stone | US | The 500 Greatest Albums of All Time | 2003 | 315 |
| Rolling Stone | US | The 500 Greatest Albums of All Time | 2012 | 317 |
| Rolling Stone | US | The 500 Greatest Albums of All Time | 2020 | 390 |
| Spin | US | Top 100 Albums of the Last 20 Years | 2005 | 6 |
| Treble | US | The Best Albums of the 80s, by Year | 2006 | 1 |
| Slant Magazine | US | Best Albums of the 1980s | 2012 | 36 |

(*) designates unordered lists.

== Track listing ==
All tracks written by Black Francis, except "Gigantic", written by Black Francis and Kim Deal.

Surfer Rosa track listing
| No. | Title | Length |
|---|---|---|
| 1. | "Bone Machine" | 3:02 |
| 2. | "Break My Body" | 2:04 |
| 3. | "Something Against You" | 1:47 |
| 4. | "Broken Face" | 1:29 |
| 5. | "Gigantic" | 3:54 |
| 6. | "River Euphrates" | 2:31 |
| 7. | "Where Is My Mind?" | 3:53 |
| 8. | "Cactus" | 2:15 |
| 9. | "Tony's Theme" | 1:51 |
| 10. | "Oh My Golly!" | 2:32 |
| 11. | "Vamos" | 4:21 |
| 12. | "I'm Amazed" | 1:41 |
| 13. | "Brick Is Red" | 2:00 |
| Total length: | | 33:21 |

=== Notes ===
- For the Surfer Rosa/Come On Pilgrim release, the eight tracks of Come On Pilgrim appear after "Brick is Red".
- The untitled eleventh track consists of a quiet recording of conversation in the studio. It exists as a separate track on some CD releases but is not listed on the artwork. As such, after track 10, the track listing numbering on the artwork does not match actual tracks on those CDs.
- The album was re-mastered and released in 2007 as a Hybrid Super Audio CD disc by Mobile Fidelity Sound Lab from recently discovered, first-generation analog original master tapes. The studio banter that makes up the untitled track on other releases is on the same track as "Oh My Golly!".

== Personnel ==
All information taken from the CD release of Surfer Rosa.

Pixies

- Black Francis – vocals, rhythm guitar, acoustic guitar
- Kim Deal – bass, vocals, lead vocals on "Gigantic" (credited as Mrs. John Murphy)
- Joey Santiago – lead guitar
- David Lovering – drums

Technical

- Steve Albini – production, audio engineering
- Simon Larbalestier, Vaughan Oliver – cover image, album booklet imagery
- Published by Rice 'n' Beans Music BMI

== Charts ==
Chart performance for Surfer Rosa
| Chart (2025) | Peak position |
|---|---|
| Croatian International Albums (HDU) | 4 |

== Certifications ==
Certifications for Surfer Rosa
| Region | Certification | Certified units/sales |
|---|---|---|
| Canada (Music Canada) | Gold | 50,000^{^} |
| New Zealand (RMNZ) | Gold | 7,500^{‡} |
| United Kingdom (BPI) for Surfer Rosa/Come On Pilgrim 1993 release | Gold | 100,000^{^} |
| United States (RIAA) | Gold | 500,000^{^} / 705,000 |
^{^} Shipments figures based on certification alone.^{‡} Sales+streaming figures based on certification alone.
