= Doolittle (album) =

1989 studio album by Pixies

Studio album by Pixies
- Released: April 17, 1989
- Recorded: October 31 – November 23, 1988
- Studio: Downtown Recorders (Boston)
- Genre: Alternative rock
- Length: 38:38
- Labels: 4AD; Elektra
- Producer: Gil Norton

Pixies chronology
Surfer Rosa (1988)	Doolittle (1989)	Bossanova (1990)

Singles from Doolittle
- 1. "Monkey Gone to Heaven" Released: March 27, 1989; 2. "Here Comes Your Man" Released: June 19, 1989

Doolittle is the second studio album by the American alternative rock band Pixies, released on April 17, 1989, on 4AD. The album was an instant critical success and became the band's breakthrough album. Doolittle was especially well received in Europe, where the British music weeklies Melody Maker and Sounds named it their album of the year. Pixies' main songwriter and lead vocalist Black Francis wrote the idiosyncratic lyrics, which allude to surrealist imagery, biblical violence, and descriptions of torture and death.

The album is praised for its "quiet/loud" dynamic, which was achieved through subdued verses that are founded on Kim Deal's bass patterns and David Lovering's drums. The peaks in tone and volume were achieved through the addition of distorted guitars by Francis and Joey Santiago. This technique influenced the development of early-1990s grunge music; Kurt Cobain said Doolittle was one of his favorite records and that its songs heavily influenced Nirvana's song "Smells Like Teen Spirit".

Upon its release, Doolittle reached number eight on the UK Albums Chart. It has sold consistently since its release, and numerous music publications have placed it among the top albums of the 1980s. Both singles from the album, "Here Comes Your Man" and "Monkey Gone to Heaven", reached the US Billboard Modern Rock Tracks, while many of the album's tracks, including "Debaser" and "Hey", remain favorites of critics and fans.

== Background ==
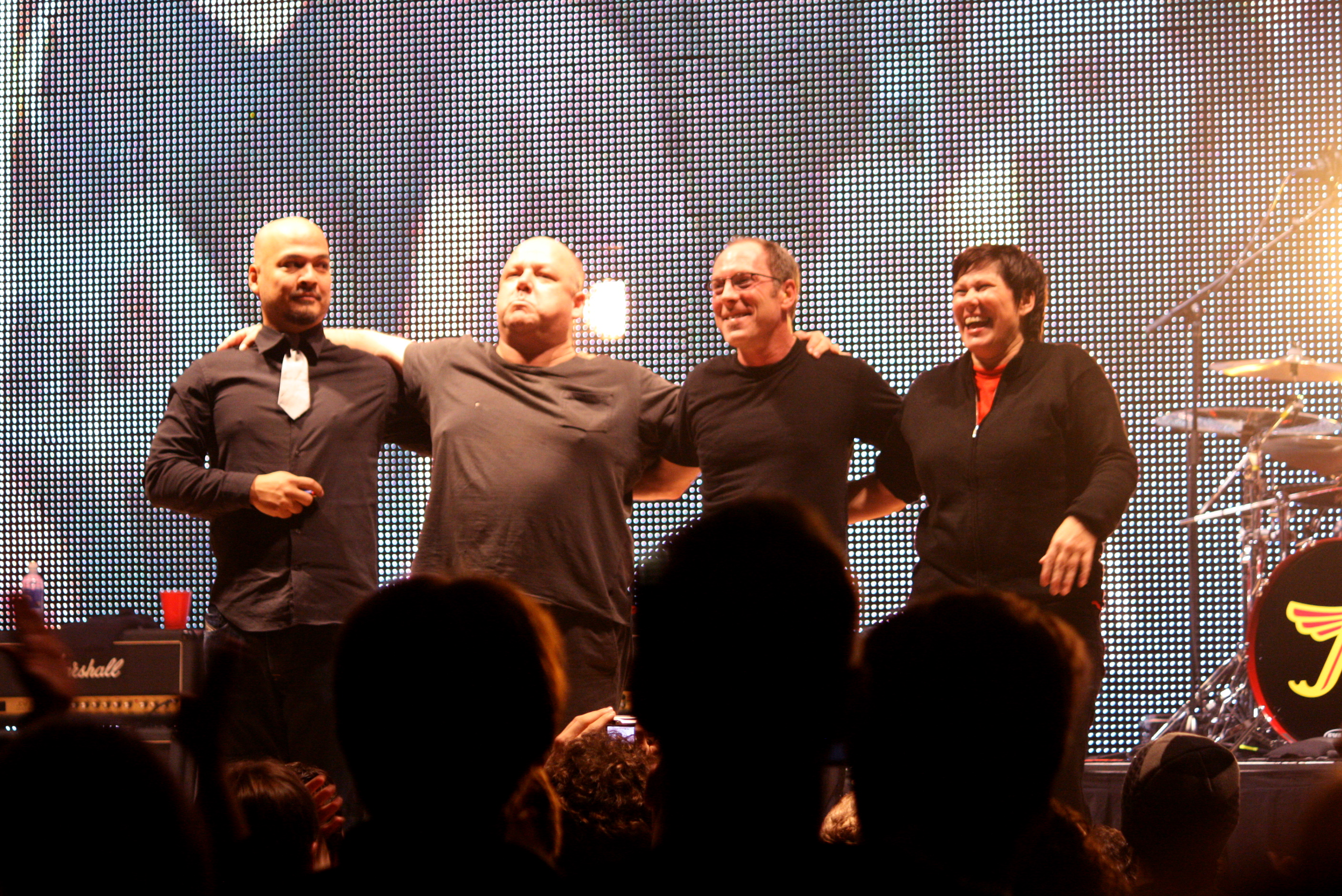
Pixies' classic line-up during a 2009 reunion. L-R: Santiago, Francis, Lovering, Deal

Pixies' 1988 album Surfer Rosa was better received in the United Kingdom than in the United States. In support of its release, the band toured Europe with fellow Bostonian band Throwing Muses, where according to a critic for the UK weekly music magazine Melody Maker, they were "welcomed like gods, which I felt underestimated them somewhat". Multiple cover photographs of Pixies were published in Melody Maker as the album peaked at number one on New Musical Express's (NME) Indie Chart.

Versions of songs that would later appear on Doolittle—including "Dead", "Hey", "Tame", and "There Goes My Gun"—were recorded in the second half of 1988 during several sessions for the BBC Radio One presenter John Peel's radio show, and "Hey" appeared on a free Extended Play (EP) that circulated with a 1988 edition of Sounds. The first demos for the album were recorded in 1988 in one week at the recording studio Eden Sound in Boston, Massachusetts, during a break from the band's touring schedule. The group's frontman and main songwriter Black Francis gave the upcoming album the provisional title Whore, which he later said was meant "in the more traditional ... operatic ... biblical sense ... as in the great whore of Babylon".

After completing the demo tape, the band's manager Ken Goes suggested two producers: Liverpudlian Gil Norton and American Ed Stasium. The band had worked with Norton on the single version of "Gigantic" in May 1988, and Francis had no preference of producer. Ivo Watts-Russell, head of the band's label 4AD, chose Norton to produce their next album. Norton arrived in Boston in mid–October 1988, when he and Francis met to review the demo recordings. They spent two days analyzing the songs' structures and arrangements, and two weeks in pre-production as Norton familiarized himself with Pixies' sound.

== Recording and production ==
Recording sessions for Doolittle began on October 31, 1988, in Boston at Downtown Recorders, which was then a 24-track studio. 4AD gave Pixies a budget of $40,000 (approximately $108,891 today), excluding producer fees. This was a relatively modest sum for a large, late-1980s independent record label but four times the amount spent on their debut Surfer Rosa. Principal recording was completed on November 23, 1988, followed by two weeks of mixing sessions which began on November 28 at Carriage House Studios, a residential studio in Stamford, Connecticut. Norton worked with two assistant recording engineers and two second assistants. He hired Steven Haigler as mixing engineer, with whom he had earlier worked at Fort Apache Studios.

Francis took a mixture of newly written and older tracks to the recording sessions. Many of the newer tracks were underdeveloped and, according to Norton, were minute or minute-and-a-half "ditties" consisting of short bursts of "verse, chorus, verse, beat-beat-beat-bang ... finished". Norton said as producer and arranger, he often built tracks by suggesting the band double or repeat sections. Of the approximately 23 songs or ideas the band started with, only three of Doolittle's final 15 tracks are longer than three minutes.

During the final mixing, Norton smoothed the band's rough edges using tight compression, and adding reverb and delay to the guitars, which he then tracked in multiple layers. This is especially notable on the intended lead single "Debaser" and in the double-tracked vocals on "Wave of Mutilation". During pre-production, Norton advised Francis to slow the tempo and lengthen several songs by adding more verses. "There Goes My Gun" was originally a much-faster and shorter Hüsker Dü-style song; on Norton's advice, Francis slowed the tempo while "Debaser" was given an extended coda. Norton's suggestions were not always welcome; several instances of advice to add verses frustrated the singer. On one occasion, Francis took Norton to a record store and handed him a copy of a Buddy Holly greatest hits album, in which most of the songs are around two or three minutes long, justifying his desire to keep his songs short. Francis later said he knew Norton was trying to give the band a more-commercial sound while he wanted the band to retain the underground sound they achieved with Albini.

Tension between Francis and the band's bassist Kim Deal were noticeable to band members and the production team during the recording. Bickering and standoffs marred the sessions, and led to increased stress among the band members. John Murphy, Deal's husband at the time, said the band dynamic "went from just all fun to work" during the production. Production continued until mixing was completed on December 12, 1988. During this period, Santiago became unhappy because he felt Norton was adding too much reverb to his guitar parts. In protest, Santiago covered his Marshall guitar amplifiers with blankets to make clear he did not want his sound to be interfered with. The final tapes were sent for mastering later that month.

== Music and lyrics ==
"Debaser"
"Debaser" is the opening track of Doolittle. This sample contains the first chorus and the bridge into the second verse.

"Monkey Gone to Heaven"
"Monkey Gone to Heaven" is the seventh track from Doolittle. This sample contains the end of the second verse and the beginning of the chorus.

Norton's production on Doolittle is markedly different from Albini's recording of Surfer Rosa and is far more polished than the debut's ambient, raw recordings. Albini's recording emphasizes Francis's abrasive guitars that both popularized the band and sealed his reputation, leading to later work with musicians such as Nirvana and PJ Harvey. Critics continue to debate whether Norton's or Albini's production best served the Pixies' music.

Two of the album's songs are based on Old Testament stories of sex and death: the story of David and Bathsheba in "Dead", and the story of Samson and Delilah in "Gouge Away". Francis's fascination with Biblical themes began in his teenage years; when he was twelve, he and his parents joined the Pentecostal church. Biblical imagery is also prevalent in "Monkey Gone to Heaven", in which using numerology, Francis describes the Devil as being "six" and God as "seven".

=== Side one ===
Doolittle opens with "Debaser", which is described as a "noisy surf-punk" song and widely considered important in Pixies' crossover to the mainstream. It begins with Deal's bass guitar pattern, which breaks into the first chorus when joined by Santiago's guitar riff and Black's shouted vocal. The track, which is a live favorite, contains an extended coda in which, according to the music critic Rob Hughes, the bassline is overlain with Santiago's "frenzied guitar riffage ... at full tilt as the song hurtles to its climax". Francis's lyrics, which he wrote while an anthropology student at University of Massachusetts Amherst, refer to "slicing up eyeballs", referencing Luis Buñuel and Salvador Dalí's 1929 film Un Chien Andalou. Francis has said he "got into avant-garde movies and Surrealism as an escape from reality ... to me, Surrealism is totally artificial".

"Tame" is built around Deal's three-note bass progression (D, C, F) overlaid by Joey Santiago's guitar parts that include an E7♯9 chord, which he described as his "Hendrix chord"—a dominant seventh with an augmented second sharp ninth chord, notable from the 1967 song "Purple Haze". Tame's "loud part" occurs during the chorus, when Francis plays a D/C/F progression and repeatedly screams "tame". Along with "Gouge Away", "Tame" is regarded as one of the peaks of Pixies' signature quiet verse / loud chorus dynamic. According to the music writer Mark Beaumont, "Tame" and "Gouge Away" were among the Pixies' tracks Kurt Cobain had in mind when writing "Smells Like Teen Spirit", which Cobain said was his attempt at "writing a Pixies song". The same influence can be heard in the Nirvana tracks "In Bloom" and "Heart-Shaped Box". The track ends with Francis and Deal repeatedly grunting, a sound that suggests two people having sex.

The lyrics of "Wave of Mutilation" are based on contemporaneous newspaper reports of Japanese men committing murder–suicide after unsuccessful business ventures in a scene Francis describes as these men being forced to drive "off a pier into the ocean". Imagery of drowning and oceans also appears in "Mr. Grieves" and "Monkey Gone to Heaven".

"Here Comes Your Man" was written when Francis was a teenager; along with "Monkey Gone to Heaven", Rolling Stone's critic Chris Mundy described the song as a melodic and "outright pop song". It was first recorded for the Purple tapes sessions, a version the music writer Phil Udell described as rough "around the edges". Norton arranged the album version.

Side One closes with the album's first single, "Monkey Gone to Heaven". The song is written in D major and opens with Francis playing a short chord progression that is backed by Deal's bass guitar. The track is over-dubbed with cellos, violins, and plucked piano strings which made Norton nervous because it took the band "outside [their] usual parameters", which they had earlier believed "we weren't ever going to do on a Pixies song". "Monkey Gone to Heaven" describes the effects of human-caused environmental destruction on the ocean. Francis said: "on one hand, it's this big organic toilet. Things get flushed and repurified or decomposed and it's this big, dark, mysterious place. It's also a very mythological place where there are octopus's gardens, the Bermuda Triangle, Atlantis, and mermaids."

=== Side two ===
The second side opens with "Mr. Grieves" played in frantic style that has been described as "faux-hillbilly" and "wired folk". The lyrics take the idea of destruction further, suggesting the human race is doomed to extinction. The following track "Crackity Jones" is sung partly in Spanish, and incorporates G♯ and A triads over a C♯ pedal. Francis's rhythm guitar starts with an eighth-note downstroke that is reminiscent of early 1980s second-wave punk rock. The lyrics of "Crackity Jones" were inspired by Francis's one-month stay in Puerto Rico as a student, when he shared a "seedy" high-rise apartment with a "weirdo, psycho, gay roommate". Musically the track is the fastest-played and most-aggressive track on the album.

The whimsical track "La La Love You" is sung by the band's drummer David Lovering in a baritone voice that was intended as a satire of the 1950s crooning style. Francis asked Lovering to sing it in a voice resembling Ringo Starr's 1960s tongue-in-cheek vocals. Its vocal style and simplistic lyrics, including the line "first base, second base, third base, home run", were intended as a parody of crude sex jokes. Because it was his only time providing vocals for a Pixies track, Lovering said on the day of recording, he was so nervous he "[knocked back] a lot of vodka".

The penultimate song "Silver" was co-written with Deal, who sings the lead vocal line. The track is built around a country music riff that is played on slide guitar; critics described the riff "sparse" and "eerie" in a manner that is reminiscent of soundtracks for late–1960s spaghetti westerns. Critics also consider the track as lacking in melody and dynamics, and it is often considered the weakest song on the album.

The lyrics of the closing song "Gouge Away" are based on the Old Testament story of Samson's betrayal by Delilah. Although the music follows the quiet/loud formula, the build-up to the loud part is more gradual and nuanced than in tracks such as "Debaser" and "Tame". "Gouge Away" is built on Deal's three-note bass part (G♯/B/E) and a tight Lovering drum pattern, which Sisario has described as a "kind of gothic dance groove". Deal, who also contributed backing vocals, is accompanied in the bridge by Santiago playing B♭ and C notes before ending on G♯ as the chorus begins. The "loud part" occurs in the verses, when both Santiago and Francis follow the bass progression using heavily distorted guitar chords.

== Artwork and title ==
"As Loud as Hell" by Simon Larbalestier, from the Doolittle booklet. The image alludes to lyrics in "I Bleed".

Photographer Simon Larbalestier and graphic artist Vaughan Oliver, who had worked on the Pixies' previous albums Come on Pilgrim and Surfer Rosa, designed the artwork of Doolittle. According to Larbalestier, Doolittle was the first album for which he and Oliver had access to lyrics, which "made a fundamental difference". Oliver and Francis wanted macabre, surreal images with which to illustrate the album. The images are placed in pairs, with each image juxtaposing two principle elements such as a monkey and a halo for "Monkey Gone to Heaven" (as well as the numbers 5, 6 and 7 in reference to the lyrics "if man is five/then the devil is six/and if the devil is six/then God is seven"); a pelvic bone and a stiletto for "Tame"; and a spoon containing hair laid across a woman's torso for "Gouge Away".

Around the time Oliver decided on the cover art, Francis discarded the album's working title Whore, worrying "people were going to think I was some kind of anti-Catholic or that I'd been raised Catholic and trying to get into this Catholic naughty-boy stuff ... A monkey with a halo, calling it Whore, that would bring all kinds of shit that wouldn't be true. So I said I'd change the title."

== Release ==
The American label Elektra Records began to take interest in Pixies around October 1988 and signed the band following a bidding war. The label then negotiated with Pixies' British label 4AD, which held the band's worldwide distribution rights. Elektra released a promotional live album containing the album tracks "Debaser" and "Gouge Away" along with earlier material. In early April, two weeks before Doolittle's release, Elektra closed a deal with 4AD that allowed them full US distribution rights; PolyGram had already secured Canadian rights.

Doolittle was released in the UK on April 17, 1989, and in the US the following day. Elektra's major label secured retail displays across the US. The label also exposed the album's lead single "Monkey Gone to Heaven" to key major and local radio stations. On the week of release, the album reached number eight on the UK Albums Chart, but charted at number 171 on the US Billboard 200. With the help of college-radio play of "Monkey Gone to Heaven", it eventually rose to number 98, spending two weeks in the Top 100. Doolittle sold steadily in America, breaking sales of 100,000 after six months. By early 1992, while Pixies were supporting U2 on their Zoo TV Tour, the album was selling 1,500 copies per week. By the middle of 1993, two years after the release of Trompe le Monde—Pixies' last album before their first breakup—Doolittle was selling an average of 1,200 copies per week. The Recording Industry Association of America (RIAA) certified Doolittle gold in 1995 and platinum in 2018.

Doolittle's success, and especially its heavy rotation on MTV, had a significant effect on the band members. According to Santiago, its sales "validated the career my parents didn’t think I had. When they first saw me on MTV, they went: 'Ah, okay. You’re not just playing shitty nightclubs!' " According to Francis, shortly after the album's release, he was pulled over by the United States Border Patrol near the Mexican border in Texas while in possession of marijuana. One of the officers recognized him from MTV, and minutes later he was posing with them for photographs while holding a shotgun.

== Reception ==
Contemporary professional ratings
Review scores
Source	Rating
Chicago Tribune	4 /4 stars
Los Angeles Times	4 /5 stars
NME	10/10
Q	4 /5 stars
Record Mirror	4/5
Rolling Stone	3.5 /5 stars
Sounds	5 /5 stars
The Village Voice	B+

Following the critically acclaimed album Surfer Rosa, Doolittle was highly anticipated; it received near-universal positive reviews, especially from the UK and European music press. NME's Edwin Pouncey wrote: "the songs on Doolittle have the power to make you literally jump out of your skin with excitement". He chose "Debaser" as one of the highlights, describing it as "blessed with the kind of beefy bass hook that originally brought 'Gigantic' to life". Q critic Peter Kane wrote the album's "carefully structured noise and straightforward rhythmic insistence makes perfect sense". Robert Christgau of The Village Voice wrote: "They're in love and they don't know why—with rock and roll, which is heartening in a time when so many college dropouts have lost touch with the verities."

Doolittle appeared on several contemporaneous end-of-year "Best Album" lists. Both Rolling Stone and The Village Voice placed the album tenth, and music magazines Sounds and Melody Maker named it as their album of the year. NME ranked the album fourth in their end-of-year list.

=== Accolades ===
Accolades for Doolittle
Publication	Country	Accolade	Year	Rank
Hot Press	Ireland	Top 100 Albums	2006	34
NME	UK	100 Best Albums	2003	2
NME	UK	NME's The 500 Greatest Albums of All Time	2013	8
Pitchfork	US	Top 100 Albums of the 1980s	2002	4
Rolling Stone	US	The 500 Greatest Albums of All Time	2003	226
Rolling Stone	US	The 500 Greatest Albums of All Time	2012	227
Rolling Stone	US	The 500 Greatest Albums of All Time	2020	141
Spin	US	100 Greatest Albums, 1985–2005	2005	36
Slant Magazine	US	Best Albums of the 1980s	2012	34

== Legacy ==
Retrospective professional ratings
Aggregate scores
Source	Rating
Metacritic	100/100
Review scores
Source	Rating
AllMusic	5 /5 stars
Blender	5 /5 stars
The Guardian	4/5 stars
Mojo	5 /5 stars
Pitchfork	10/10
Q	5 /5 stars
Rolling Stone	5 /5 stars
The Rolling Stone Album Guide	4.5 /5 stars
Spin	A
Uncut	10/10

Doolittle is widely regarded as one of the key alternative rock albums of the 1980s. A 2002 Rolling Stone review gave it the maximum score of five stars, writing it laid the "groundwork for Nineties rock". Doolittle was included in critic Robert Dimery's influential book 1001 Albums You Must Hear Before You Die. PopMatters included it in their list of the "12 Essential 1980s Alternative Rock Albums" saying, "Doolittle captured the musicians at the top of their game". In a 2017 survey, Pitchfork ranked it as the fourth-best album of the 1980s; a 2003 poll of NME writers ranked Doolittle as the second-greatest album of all time; and Rolling Stone placed it at number 141 on its 2020 list of "The 500 Greatest Albums of All Time".

Doolittle established Pixies' loud/quiet dynamic, which became highly influential on alternative rock. After writing "Smells Like Teen Spirit", both Kurt Cobain and Krist Novoselic of Nirvana thought: "this really sounds like the Pixies. People are really going to nail us for this." Norton was frequently credited with capturing the album's dynamics and became highly sought after by bands wishing to achieve a similar sound. The English musician PJ Harvey said she was "in awe" of "I Bleed" and "Tame", and described Francis's writing as "amazing". British band Slowdive have also noted Doolittle as a significant influence on their sound.

Ten years after Pixies' breakup, Doolittle continued to sell between 500 and 1,000 copies a week, and following their 2004 reunion tour, sales reached 1,200 copies per week. At the end of 2005, best estimates put total US sales at between 800,000 and 1,000,000 copies. As of 2015, sales in the United States have exceeded 834,000 copies, according to Nielsen SoundScan.

Pixies released several singles from Doolittle after their initial breakup. In 1997, "Debaser" was released to promote the compilation Death to the Pixies. In June 1989, 4AD released "Here Comes Your Man" as the album's second single. It reached number three on the US Modern Rock Tracks chart and number 54 in the UK Singles Chart. On May 6, 2019, "Here Comes Your Man" was certified gold in Canada, and "Hey" was certified gold in Canada on September 20, 2021.

In 2020, Jennifer Makowsky of PopMatters said: "Doolittle remains a solid disc in the spine of ’80s alternative rock."

== Reissues ==
To mark the 25th anniversary of Doolittle, 4AD released Doolittle 25, which includes unreleased B-sides, demos, and two full Peel sessions Pixies recorded for the BBC. On December 9, 2016, a Pure Audio Blu-Ray version of the album, containing a 5.1 surround sound mix by Kevin Vanbergen and a high-definition stereo mix by Mobile Fidelity Sound Lab, was released. In 2022, Doolittle was formatted for Spatial Audio with Dolby Atmos and released on Apple Music.

== Track listing ==
All tracks are written by Black Francis, except "Silver", written by Black Francis and Kim Deal.

Doolittle track listing
No.	Title	Length
1.	"Debaser"	2:52
2.	"Tame"	1:55
3.	"Wave of Mutilation"	2:04
4.	"I Bleed"	2:34
5.	"Here Comes Your Man"	3:21
6.	"Dead"	2:21
7.	"Monkey Gone to Heaven"	2:56
8.	"Mr. Grieves"	2:05
9.	"Crackity Jones"	1:24
10.	"La La Love You"	2:43
11.	"No. 13 Baby"	3:51
12.	"There Goes My Gun"	1:49
13.	"Hey"	3:31
14.	"Silver"	2:25
15.	"Gouge Away"	2:45
Total length:		38:38

== Personnel ==
Credits adapted from the liner notes of Doolittle.

Pixies

- Black Francis – vocals, rhythm guitar, acoustic guitar
- Kim Deal – bass guitar, vocals, acoustic slide guitar ("Silver"), plucked piano strings ("Monkey Gone to Heaven")
- Joey Santiago – lead guitar, backing vocals
- David Lovering – drums, lead vocal ("La La Love You"), bass guitar ("Silver")

Additional musicians

- Karen Karlsrud – violin ("Monkey Gone to Heaven")
- Corine Metter – violin ("Monkey Gone to Heaven")
- Arthur Fiacco – cello ("Monkey Gone to Heaven")
- Ann Rorich – cello ("Monkey Gone to Heaven")

Technical

- Gil Norton – producer, engineer
- Dave Snider – assistant engineer
- Matt Lane – assistant engineer
- Steve Haigler – mixing
- Vaughan Oliver – art direction, sleeve design
- Simon Larbalestier – photography
- Chris Bigg – calligraphy

== Charts ==
Chart performance for Doolittle
Chart (1989–1998)	Peak position	Weeks
Dutch Albums (Album Top 100)	53	9
French Albums (SNEP)	66	2
New Zealand Albums (RMNZ)	18	5
UK Albums (OCC)	8	11
US Billboard 200	98	27

== Certifications ==
Certifications for Doolittle
Region	Certification	Certified units/sales
Canada (Music Canada)	Gold	50,000^{^}
France (SNEP)	Gold	100,000^{*}
New Zealand (RMNZ)	Gold	7,500^{‡}
United Kingdom (BPI)	Platinum	300,000^{*}
United States (RIAA)	Platinum	1,000,000^{‡}
^{*} Sales figures based on certification alone.^{^} Shipments figures based on certification alone.^{‡} Sales+streaming figures based on certification alone.
