= The Breeders discography =

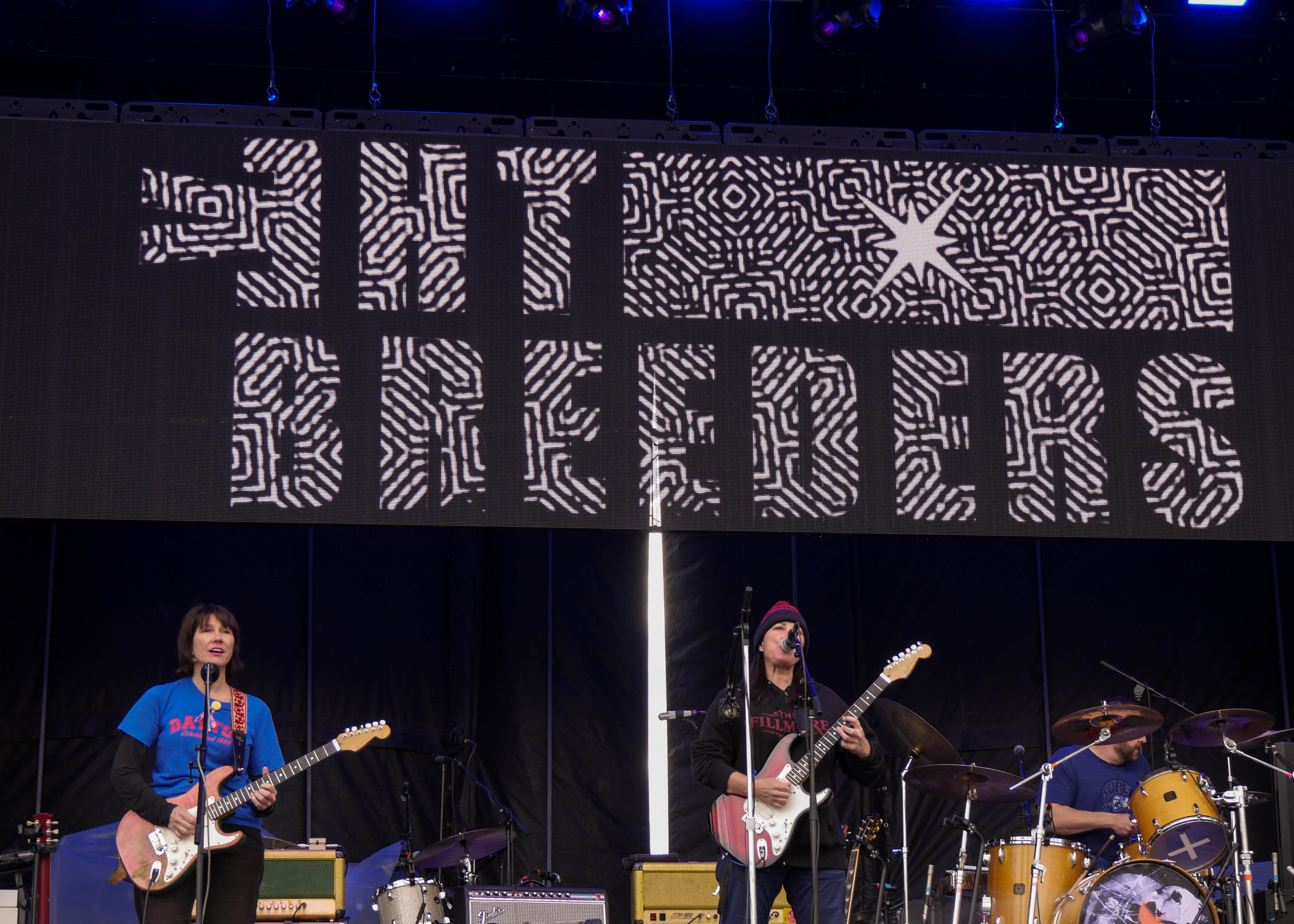
- The Breeders performing in 2018
- Studio albums: 5
- Extended plays: 3
- Live albums: 1
- Singles: 10
- Music videos: 12

The discography of American alternative rock band The Breeders consists of five studio albums, one live album, three extended plays, ten singles and twelve music videos. Kim Deal, then-bassist of American alternative rock band the Pixies, formed The Breeders as a side-project with Tanya Donelly, guitarist of American alternative rock band Throwing Muses. After recording a demo tape, The Breeders signed to the English independent record label 4AD in 1989. Their debut studio album Pod was released in May 1990, but was not commercially successful. After the revival of the Pixies and Throwing Muses in 1990, The Breeders became mostly inactive until the Pixies' breakup in 1993. With a new lineup, The Breeders released their Safari EP in 1992, followed by their second studio album Last Splash in 1993. Last Splash was The Breeders' most successful album; it peaked at number 33 on the United States Billboard 200 and was certified platinum by the Recording Industry Association of America in 1994. The album spawned the band's most successful single, "Cannonball". The single peaked at number 44 on the US Billboard Hot 100 and at number two on the Billboard Alternative Songs chart.

Following the release of the EP Head to Toe, The Breeders once again became inactive until 2002, when they released their third studio album, Title TK. It failed to match the previous success of Last Splash, and in 2004 the band were dropped from Elektra Records in the United States. Mountain Battles, the band's fourth studio album, was released on April 7, 2008. It peaked at number 98 on the Billboard 200.

== Albums ==
=== Studio albums ===
List of studio albums, with selected chart positions and certifications
Title	Album details	Peak chart positions										Certifications
Title	Album details	US	AUS	CAN	FRA	IRE	NLD	NZ	SPA	SWE	UK	Certifications
Pod	Released: May 28, 1990; Label: 4AD; Formats: CD, cassette, LP	—	—	—	—	—	73	—	—	—	22	
Last Splash	Released: August 31, 1993; Label: 4AD; Formats: CD, cassette, LP	33	22	44	—	—	41	11	—	43	5	RIAA: Platinum; ARIA: Gold; BPI: Silver; MC: Gold
Title TK	Released: May 21, 2002; Label: 4AD; Formats: CD, LP	130	42	—	91	36	—	—	—	—	51	
Mountain Battles	Released: April 7, 2008; Label: 4AD; Formats: CD, LP, digital download	98	—	—	100	21	—	—	—	—	46	
All Nerve	Released: March 2, 2018; Label: 4AD; Formats: CD, LP, digital download	79	44	—	—	49	79	—	74	—	9	
"—" denotes a recording that did not chart or was not released in that territory.

=== Live albums ===
List of live albums
Title	Album details
Live in Stockholm 1994	Released: 1994; Label: 4AD; Formats: CD

=== Extended plays ===
List of extended plays, with selected chart positions
Title	Album details	Peak chart positions	
Title	Album details	US Sales	UK
Safari	Released: April 6, 1992; Label: 4AD; Formats: CD, 12"	—	69
Head to Toe	Released: August 11, 1994; Label: 4AD; Formats: 7", 10"	—	68
Fate to Fatal	Released: April 21, 2009; Label: 4AD; Formats: 12", digital download	3	—
"—" denotes a recording that did not chart or was not released in that territory.

== Singles ==
List of singles, with selected chart positions, showing year released and album name
Title	Year	Peak chart positions								Album
Title	Year	US	US Alt.	US Main.	AUS	CAN Digital	FRA	NLD	UK	Album
"Cannonball"	1993	44	2	32	58	—	8	35	40	Last Splash
"Divine Hammer"	1993	— (Note: "Divine Hammer" did not enter the Billboard Hot 100 chart, but peaked at number 4 on the Bubbling Under Hot 100 Singles chart.)	28	—	—	—	—	—	59	Last Splash
"Saints"	1994	— (Note: "Saints" did not enter the Billboard Hot 100 chart, but peaked at number 9 on the Bubbling Under Hot 100 Singles chart.)	12	—	—	—	—	—	—	Last Splash
"Climbing the Sun"	1997	—	—	—	—	—	—	—	—	Non-album single
"Off You"	2002	—	—	—	—	25	—	—	200	Title TK
"Huffer"	2002	—	—	—	—	—	—	—	—	Title TK
"Son of Three"	2003	—	—	—	—	—	—	—	72	Title TK
"Bang On"	2008	—	—	—	—	—	—	—	—	Mountain Battles
"We're Gonna Rise"	2008	—	—	—	—	—	—	—	—	Mountain Battles
"Walk It Off"	2008	—	—	—	—	—	—	—	—	Mountain Battles
"Wait in the Car"	2017	—	—	—	—	—	—	—	—	All Nerve
"—" denotes a recording that did not chart or was not released in that territory.

== Other appearances ==
List of guest appearances, showing year released and album name
Title	Year	Album
"Safari" (Remix)	1992	Volume Three
"Collage"	1999	The Mod Squad soundtrack
"Wicked Little Town" (Hedwig version)	2003	Wig in a Box

== Music videos ==
List of music videos, showing year released and director
Title	Year	Director(s)
"Hellbound"	1990	—N/a
"Safari"	1992	—N/a
"Iris" (version 1)	1993	Neil Breakwell
"Iris" (version 2)	1993	Hal Hartley
"Cannonball"	1993	Kim Gordon, Spike Jonze
"Divine Hammer"	1993	Kim Gordon, Spike Jonze, Richard Kern
"Saints"	1994	Frank Sacramento
"Shocker in Gloomtown"	1994	Jesse Peretz
"Huffer"	2002	Kevin Kerslake
"Son of Three"	2003	—N/a
"Walk It Off"	2008	—N/a
"Fate to Fatal"	2009	James Ford, Mando Lopez, Kelley Deal
"Spacewoman"	2018	Richard Ayoade
