= Pod (The Breeders album) =

1990 studio album by the Breeders

Studio album by the Breeders
- Released: May 29, 1990
- Recorded: January 1990
- Studios: Palladium, Edinburgh, Scotland
- Genre: Alternative rock
- Length: 30:35
- Labels: 4AD, Elektra
- Producer: Steve Albini (credited as engineer)

The Breeders chronology
Pod (1990)	Safari (1992)

Pod is the debut studio album by American alternative rock band the Breeders, released by 4AD records on May 29, 1990. Engineered by Steve Albini, the album features band leader Kim Deal on vocals and guitar, Josephine Wiggs on bass, Britt Walford on drums, and Tanya Donelly on guitar. Albini's production prioritized sound over technical accomplishment; the final takes favor the band's spontaneous live "in studio" performances.

The Breeders formed in 1988 when Deal, bass player for Pixies, befriended Donelly of Throwing Muses during a European tour. They recorded a country-infused demo in 1989, leading to 4AD co-founder Ivo Watts-Russell funding an album, Pod, recorded that year at the Palladium studio in Edinburgh, Scotland. The cover art was designed by Vaughan Oliver and portrays a man performing a fertility dance while wearing a belt of eels.

Due in part to Deal's work with the Pixies, the album was widely anticipated, particularly in Europe. It became a critical and popular success, reaching number 22 in the UK. Critics praised its dark, sexualized lyrics, and compared it favorably to the Pixies. Nirvana's Kurt Cobain said it was one of his favorite records, and Pitchfork ranked it number 81 on its list of the best albums of the 1990s.

== Background ==
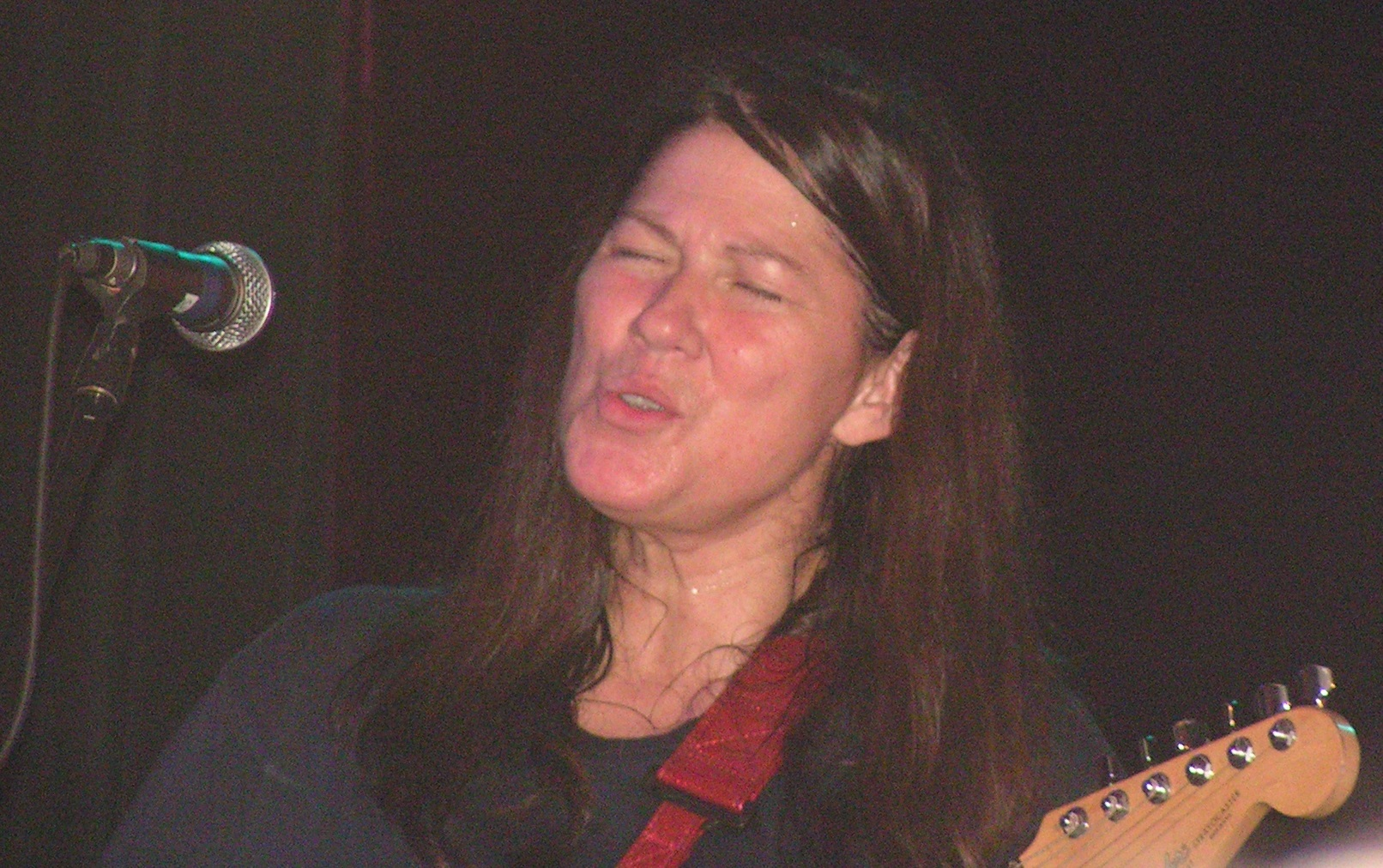
Kim Deal performing in 2008

In 1988, Kim Deal of the Pixies became friends with Tanya Donelly of Throwing Muses when their respective bands undertook a joint tour of Europe. Deal and Donelly spent time together playing guitar, drinking beer, and sharing musical ideas. They often went clubbing together in the bands' hometown of Boston. While attending a Sugarcubes concert, the two drunkenly decided to write and record dance songs. Their first attempt to work together was based around the idea of an "organic dance band" consisting of Deal on bass, Donelly on guitar, and two drummers. They recorded Donelly's "Rise" with Throwing Muses' David Narcizo, and planned more originals, as well as a cover of Rufus and Chaka Khan's "Tell Me Something Good".

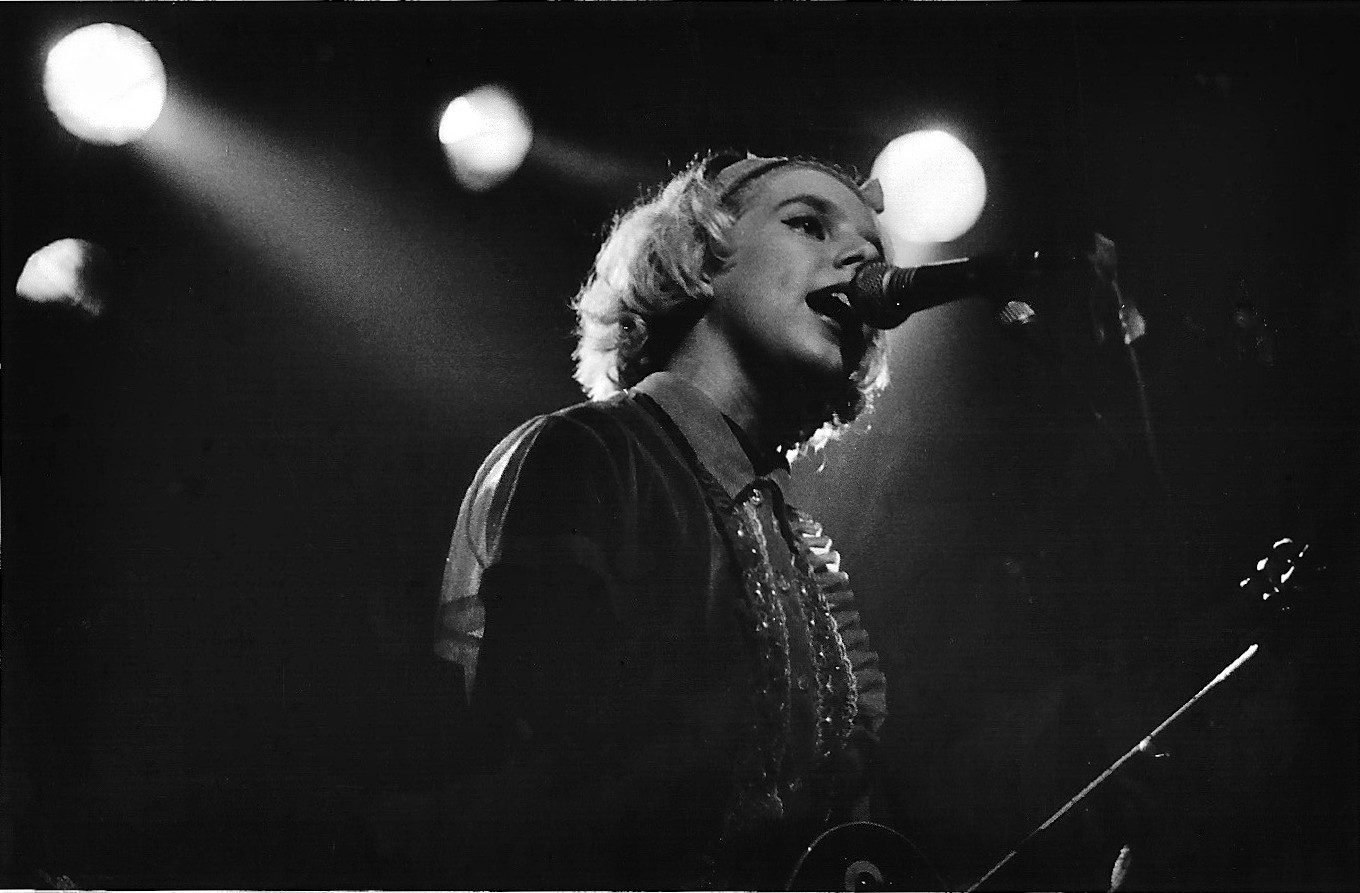
Tanya Donelly (shown in 1991) and Kim Deal started the Breeders after becoming friends in 1988.

A year and a half passed without the pair recording new material. During this time, they decided their attempt at dance music was not working, and resolved to repurpose their songs for a different genre. Deal became more serious about her work with Donnelly when the Pixies' Black Francis announced he was undertaking a solo tour. She decided that if he could be active outside of the Pixies, then she could too.

Journalists have speculated that Deal felt motivated to start a new band because of her diminishing role and lack of creative input in the Pixies, which Deal has often denied. However, in one interview she complained angrily about Francis singing lead vocals in almost all of the band's songs and said that if she could not sing more in the Pixies, she would sing in another band instead. Pixies' guitarist Joey Santiago later recalled that Deal had a strong desire to contribute songs to the group to express her creativity, but eventually resigned herself and begrudgingly accepted Francis as the band's sole singer and songwriter. According to Francis, Deal had once offered several new songs to the group that were not accepted because they sounded too different from the band's repertoire; in Santiago's view, Francis’ own rejection of the songs reflected his attitude that the group "made pizzas, not cookies". Francis admitted in the mid-1990s to not especially liking Deal's non-Pixies music, due to "personal taste". (Note: Francis said: "I honestly don't listen to female singers much. I'm very picky about the women I listen to. I think everybody enjoys listening to singers of their same sex more. It goes back to when you're a kid and dream of being that singer or being in that band.")

Because the Pixies and Throwing Muses were signed to different American record labels, (Note: The Pixies and Throwing Muses were signed to UK-based 4AD, which handled UK distribution of both bands, and mainland European distribution of the Pixies only; for US distribution, 4AD licensed Pixies' albums to Elektra. Throwing Muses were distributed by Sire in the US, and by its parent company Warner Music in the rest of Europe. As part of their 4AD contract, Deal and Francis signed a "leaving members" clause whereby if they left the Pixies they would still owe the remaining number of contracted albums to the label. After the Pixies broke up in 1993, the Breeders' albums Pod, Last Splash (1993) and Title TK (2002), as well as Pacer (1995) by Deal's side-project band the Amps, were included in the albums she owed 4AD as part of the leaving members clause. She later signed a one-off distribution deal with 4AD for the Breeders' Mountain Battles (2008), then released their EP Fate to Fatal (2009) independently, after which she returned to the label for All Nerve (2018). In the US, Pod was first licensed to Rough Trade America, and later to Elektra. All of Deal's non-Pixies albums up to Title TK were likewise licensed to Elektra, while Mountain Battles and All Nerve were only released on 4AD. Deal has noted that by the time of Mountain Battles, 4AD was doing more worldwide distribution itself rather than licensing albums in countries outside the UK.) Deal and Donelly could not both be principal songwriters for their joint project. They focused on Deal's compositions for what would become Pod, intending to use Donelly's songs for a subsequent album. After Pod's release, Deal and Donelly recorded a demo of the latter's songs in preparation for the Breeders' second album. Donelly left the group in 1991, and used her compositions for her new band, Belly. Before parting, she contributed guitar and vocals to the Breeders' 1992 Safari EP, although none of her compositions appear on the record.

=== Demo ===
In 1989 the pair recorded a country music-influenced demo with violinist Carrie Bradley and bassist Ray Holiday. Paul Kolderie engineered several of the songs, but Deal found his production "too clean" and employed Joe Harvard of Fort Apache Studios to remix. Deal called the project "the Breeders", a name she and her sister Kelley had used when performing as teenagers. The name comes from a slang term used in the LGBT community to refer to straight people, which Kim found amusing. Ivo Watts-Russell, co-founder of the Pixies' and Throwing Muses' UK label 4AD, was enthusiastic about the demo and Deal's potential as a songwriter, and gave the band an advance of $11,000 to record an album.

Although Deal played bass with the Pixies, she changed to guitar for the Breeders, finding it an easier instrument to manage while singing, and so recruited Josephine Wiggs of the Perfect Disaster on bass. Deal asked Steve Albini, who had worked on the Pixies' Surfer Rosa, to engineer the album. Deal thought it would be fun to form an all-female band, "[like] the Bangles from Hell". She wanted Kelley to be the Breeders' drummer, but Kelley could not get time away from her job as a program analyst. (Note: Kelley later joined the Breeders, and played guitar on Safari.) As an alternative, Albini suggested they try Slint's Britt Walford, who used the pseudonym Shannon Doughton for Pod because he did not want his contribution to the album to overshadow his role in Slint. Deal, Wiggs, and Walford rehearsed for a week at Wiggs' house in Bedfordshire, England, before joining Donelly in London for further rehearsals.

== Recording ==
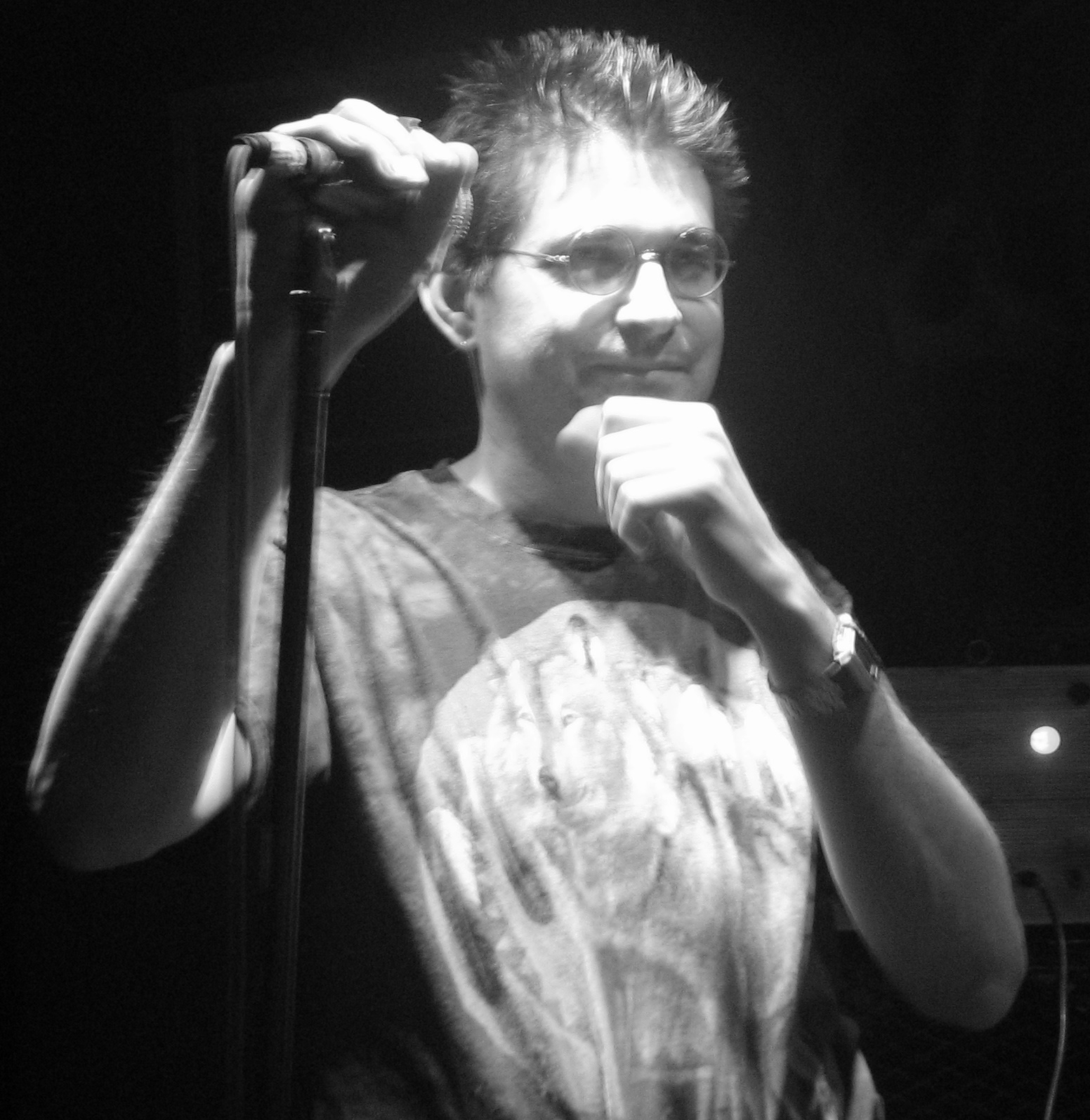
Steve Albini was the engineer of the Pod session.

Pod was recorded in January 1990 at Palladium studio, in Edinburgh, Scotland, which had recording equipment on the first floor and bedrooms upstairs. During the sessions, the band sometimes wore pajamas, and more than once went to a local pub without changing. Although 4AD booked the studio for two weeks, the band completed their recording in a single week. To use the remaining time, the label hired a television crew to film a music video, and the band recorded a session for John Peel's show on BBC Radio 1.

Albini—who worked on thousands of recordings including albums by Nirvana, Page and Plant, and PJ Harvey—described his role as more technical than artistic, and preferred to be described as an engineer rather than producer. He had a preference for analogue recording techniques, and was noted for his careful placement of microphones in the studio to achieve a nuanced "roomy" sound. Further, in Albini's ethical approach to recording and to the mechanics of the music industry, he made a point of not attempting to influence the band's song arrangements. He was known for his vocal and dim view of the music industry, and the press often depicted him as not easy to work with. He also sometimes had a reputation for being misogynist, in part from the name of his former band Rapeman.

Despite his reputation, Donelly recalls being especially comfortable working with Albini, whom she found "sweet". Wiggs and Donelly have both commented that although Albini often downplays his degree of influence on an album's quality, for Pod his contributions were considerable. Donelly has praised Albini for the input that he gave the band prior to recording. This included convincing the band to reduce the number of vocal harmonies and give more prominence to Deal's vocals. Donelly believes the removal of harmonies made the performances "more effective and sadder and ... focused". Albini paid attention to capturing strong live performances in the studio. His main concern was achieving the best sound, rather than seeking the best technical performances.

Albini had a policy of never doing more than two takes of each song. This led to confrontations with Donelly, who remembers: "For all the fights we had with him in the studio, for all the times I'd stomp upstairs in my pajamas screaming that I couldn't live with such-and-such a guitar part, the next morning I realized he was usually right." Deal also often fought with Albini. Wiggs was struck with how quickly Albini and the other musicians resolved issues through short, intense arguments, an ability she attributed to their being American. Albini saw Walford's drumming as an integral part of the band's sound. Then 19 years old, Walford was a confident and hard-hitting drummer who typically played one of his drums behind the beat. Song tempos were faster than Wiggs had expected, which arose in part because Deal lacked the breath control to sing her lines in a slower manner.

== Music and lyrics ==
Pod has sparse instrumentation. Music critic Colin Larkin likened the album to the Pixies for its threatening melodies and loud, resounding guitars. The New York Times' Karen Schoemer also found similarities to the Pixies, citing Pod's "angular melodies, shattered tempos and screeching dynamics", but felt the album nonetheless had its own identity distinct from Deal's previous band. Unlike the demo, the album does not have a country-influenced sound.

Other writers have noted the album's sinister, sexual and youthful feel. Matt LeMay of Pitchfork wrote that Deal's singing is spooky, and evokes a mythical siren or a young girl hiding a weapon. Melody Maker's Ted Mico compared the tone of the songs to the innocent-looking girl in Poltergeist who dribbles blood. Albini said that "there was a simultaneous charm to Kim's presentation to her music that's both childlike and giddy and also completely mature and kind of dirty ... [it had a] sort of girlish fascination with things that were pretty but it was also kind of horny. That was a juxtaposition that, at the time, was unusual. You didn't get a lot of knowing winks from female artists at the time."

=== Songs ===
"Doe"
Critics have cited "Doe" as encapsulating qualities heard in multiple tracks on Pod, including its "pretty" and "wrenching" aspects (Pitchfork's Matt LeMay) and its "good-natured[ness]" (AllMusic's Heather Phares).

"Happiness Is a Warm Gun"
For LeMay, the Breeders' version of "Happiness Is a Warm Gun" is likewise representative of the entire album, in the song's "bipolar" extremes from "disarmingly gorgeous" to "punishingly gritty and violent".

Deal has said that many of the songs are sexual in nature. The slow-paced opening track "Glorious" describes an adult who has vague but pleasant memories of being molested as a child by an aunt. It and the next song, "Doe", were co-written by Ray Halliday. "Doe" concerns a schizophrenic teenage couple losing their grip of reality after taking Thorazine; in a delusional state they plan to burn down their town. LeMay described this track as possessing a beautiful, gripping quality, while NME's Steve Lamacq cited it as an example of using reduced instrumentation to good effect ("stripped down but punchy").

Larkin believes that the band's cover of the Beatles' "Happiness Is a Warm Gun" achieves a friction that the original only hints at, and Lamacq commented on its tight sound and prominent drum part. The Breeders recorded the song at the suggestion of Watts-Russell. "Oh!" has—according to writer Martin Aston—a slow tempo, restrained drumming, a sad violin performance by Carrie Bradley, and unexpectedly raw singing by Deal. She had planned to use the title "The Insect Song" because its lyrics tell the story of one insect encouraging others, hoping they do not get stepped on.

Deal has said that "Hellbound" described a fetus that survives an abortion, and that the song is "kinda like a heavy metal hymnal, 'We're all hellbound.'" She cited the line "It lives, despite the knives internal" as containing the most embarrassing lyrics she has written. Before recording, the other band members teased her about the line, but since she could not think of a better alternative, she kept the phrase but mumbled the line to make the words harder to understand. For Sasha Alcott, writing for the Boston Herald, the song contains elements of "fierce head-banging sing-a-long" as well as gentle whimsy. About "When I Was a Painter", the next track, Lamacq was struck by Deal's gruff vocals and praised its stop-start guitar riff. Critic Rob Sheffield named the song as a highlight of the album in the Spin Alternative Record Guide, and Piers Clifton interpreted it as being about strange or otherwise unsatisfying sex.

Side 2 of the LP version starts with "Fortunately Gone", which Lamacq described as an appealing pop-flavored opening for the album's second half. Deal had originally practiced the song with Kelley several years previously. The lyrics concern a woman who has died but continues to obsessively watch over her lover, not able to give him up, even after death. "Iris" was interpreted by Larkin and critic Wif Stenger as being about menstruation. In a 1990 interview, Deal said the song related to something "like a pea pod flowering and then getting ripe and stinky", and connected it to the Surrealists' "associat[ing] women with fish". The writer Simon Reynolds described Deal's wolfish, staccato delivery of the repeated word "Oh!", as well as the "little gashes of gruelling, groiny feedback".

A recurring sexual dream of Walford's inspired the lyrics of "Opened". The track features a buoyant rhythm and was described by Stenger as exhilaratingly bringing the listener somewhere between reality and the supernatural. "Only in 3s", which Deal wrote with Donelly, is about a ménage à trois sexual relationship. AllMusic's Heather Phares characterized the recording as "sensual" and said that it was more benign and friendly-sounding than the Pixies' work.

"Lime House" was described in a Billboard review as feeling "avant-garage". The song concerns Sherlock Holmes spending long and comfortable hours in an opium den. Wiggs co-wrote and played Spanish guitar on the final track, "Metal Man". The song contains harmonies between her and Deal; Wiggs' spoken vocals were compared by Stenger to those of the group Wire and by Reynolds to the vocal style of Sonic Youth's Kim Gordon. Aston likened the melody to the Pixies' "Cactus".

== Release ==
Pod was released in the UK on May 29, 1990, by 4AD. Watts-Russell planned the date to be not too close to the release of the Pixies' Bossanova two and a half months later, for more effective publicity of both albums. Watts-Russell believed the album would be better suited to a US independent distribution label rather than the Pixies' American distributor Elektra, and licensed Pod to Rough Trade America. When this division of Rough Trade went bankrupt, Elektra assumed distribution of Pod in the US. Deal has noted that the Breeders did not receive any royalties from initial US sales because of Rough Trade's bankruptcy.

The album was widely anticipated by the British music press due to the involvement of Deal and Donelly—known from their highly regarded work with the Pixies and Throwing Muses, respectively—and Albini, who likewise had a strong reputation for his previous engineering work. It reached number 22 in the UK, where it was promoted by a full-page ad in Melody Maker, and number 73 in the Netherlands. Pod sold moderately well, although Deal has noted it "never sold [anything]" compared to their next album, Last Splash (1993), which was certified platinum in the US and silver in the UK.

Deal took the idea for the album's title from a painting that she saw in Boston; for her, the word "pod" evoked a uterus, which Wiggs has noted relates to the theme of fertility and the group's name. The cover art was designed by longtime 4AD album designer Vaughan Oliver and employs photography by Kevin Westenberg. Oliver, in an attempt to seduce Deal, who he believed would appreciate the humor, attached a belt of dead eels over his underwear, which he intended as phallic symbols. He performed a fertility dance, while Westenberg took pictures of him using a long exposure to achieve blurring and other visual effects.

== Reception ==
Professional ratings
Review scores
Source	Rating
AllMusic	4.5/5 stars
Blender	2/5 stars
Encyclopedia of Popular Music	3/5 stars
Entertainment Weekly	B−
NME	9/10
Pitchfork	9.0/10
The Rolling Stone Album Guide	4/5 stars
Select	5/5 stars
Spin	4.5/5 stars
Spin Alternative Record Guide	6/10

The album was generally well received. Several music critics favorably compared the album to Deal's work with the Pixies, among which were William Van Meter, Rob Sheffield, and Steve Kandell of Spin. Kandell and Sheffield mentioned tracks including "Fortunately Gone" as superior to songs by that group. Kandell noted Pod appealed to fans of the Pixies' "Gigantic", which was written and sung by Deal. In AllMusic, Heather Phares described Pod as a "vibrantly creative debut" that was better than the Pixies' 1990 album Bossanova, and argued that the Pixies should have recorded more of Deal's compositions.

The Rough Guide to Rock's Piers Clifton and Melody Maker's Simon Reynolds viewed Pod as lacking energy in comparison to the Pixies' work. To Clifton, it was "plodding", while Reynolds felt it sounded "inhibited, moribund, stilted" and "never [let] it rip like the Pixies". Reynolds added that "Whenever a song gathers momentum or thrust, [the Breeders] throw in a weird bit, a gear change or an abrupt stop. They seem unhappy with the idea of simple rock exuberance." Steve Taylor of The A to X of Alternative Music also found Pod inferior to music of the Pixies, but was impressed with Deal's ability to move from bass to guitar.

Some reviews found Pod under-developed or insubstantial. Jon Dolan in Blender likened it to a poorly constructed building. Robert Christgau of The Village Voice described it unfavorably as more "art project" than the work of a band, and Greg Sandow in Entertainment Weekly felt the lyrics were sometimes forced.

Wif Stenger of Trouser Press called the first side "a bit shaky" but considered side 2 to be "damn near perfect". NME's Steve Lamacq described the album as "a tight-ish piece of tantalising rock", and said that listeners who found it too minimalist would soon warm to it. Karen Schoemer of The New York Times praised Pod's intelligence and originality.

== Legacy ==
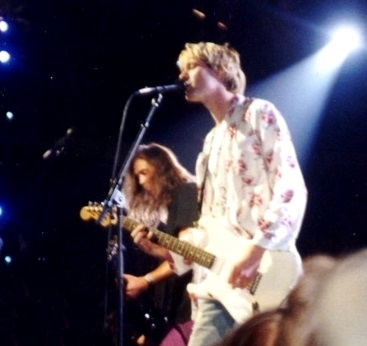
Kurt Cobain was an admirer of Pod.

Nirvana singer Kurt Cobain often described Pod as one of his favorite albums. He listed it as his seventh and then third favorite album in his private journals, and said it was his number-one favorite album in a 1992 Melody Maker article, in which he said: "The way they structure [the songs is] totally unique, very atmospheric." Cobain had wished to work with Steve Albini since first listening to his band Big Black in the 1980s. Cobain's special admiration of Pod and Surfer Rosa—as well as his desire for a similar drum sound, a "natural, powerful sound produced with canny microphone placement rather than phony sounding effects boxes", that he found reminiscent of Aerosmith's Rocks—then led him to select Albini as the producer of Nirvana's third studio album, In Utero. Pod also influenced Courtney Love's songwriting on Live Through This, the second album by her band Hole. In 2018 critic Amanda Petrusich noted the enduring influence of Pod on contemporary indie rock musicians Courtney Barnett, Lucy Dacus, and Julien Baker.

In 2007, Albini said he felt Pod was among the best albums he had engineered; a 2015 article in Stereogum ranked it as Albini's eighth best album. Donelly described it as the "truest" of her albums and said that "it really feels exactly the way it was when we were doing it." Wiggs has spoken of her ongoing fondness for Pod, and recalls that everyone in the making of the album was dedicated and attentive; for Deal, the album is "just magic". In 2003 Pitchfork placed the album as the 81st best of the 1990s. It was ranked number 463 in NME's 500 Greatest Albums of All Time list (2013) and included in The Guardian's 1000 Albums to Hear Before You Die (2007). Separate articles in both publications have ranked the Breeders' version of "Happiness Is a Warm Gun" among the best cover versions of a Beatles song.

== Track listing ==
All tracks are written by Kim Deal, except where noted.

No.	Title	Writer(s)	Length
1.	"Glorious"	Deal, Ray Halliday	3:23
2.	"Doe"	Deal, Halliday	2:06
3.	"Happiness Is a Warm Gun"	Lennon–McCartney	2:46
4.	"Oh!"		2:27
5.	"Hellbound"		2:21
6.	"When I Was a Painter"		3:24
7.	"Fortunately Gone"		1:44
8.	"Iris"		3:29
9.	"Opened"		2:28
10.	"Only in 3's"	Deal, Tanya Donelly	1:56
11.	"Lime House"		1:45
12.	"Metal Man"	Deal, Josephine Wiggs	2:46

== Personnel ==
The Breeders

- Kim Deal – lead vocals, guitar
- Tanya Donelly – guitar, backing vocals
- Josephine Wiggs – bass guitar, backing vocals, Spanish guitar and lead vocals on "Metal Man"
- Britt Walford (credited as Shannon Doughton) – drums, backing vocals
- Carrie Bradley – violin

Additional personnel

- Steve Albini – engineer, spoken vocals
- Michael Allen – backing vocals on "Oh!"
- Vaughan Oliver/V23 (Note: V23 was a graphic design studio at which Oliver produced art for record companies.) – sleeve design
- Kevin Westenberg – photography

== Charts ==
Chart (1990)	Peak position
Dutch Albums Chart	73
UK Albums Chart	22
