= Saints (song) =

1994 single by the Breeders

Single by the Breeders

from the album Last Splash
- B-side: "Grunggae", "New Year"
- Released: 1994
- Genre: Alternative rock
- Length: 3:17
- Label: 4AD/Elektra Records
- Songwriter(s): Kim Deal

The Breeders singles chronology
"Divine Hammer" (1993)	"Saints" (1994)	"No Aloha" (1994)

"Saints" is a song by the Breeders, released as the third and final single from their 1993 album Last Splash. It was released in 1994 on 4AD/Elektra Records.

== Track listing ==
All tracks are written by Kim Deal.

No.	Title	Length
1.	"Saints"	2:32
2.	"Grunggae" (early demo of "Cannonball")	2:35
3.	"New Year" (demo)	2:02

The single version of "Saints" differs from the one featured on Last Splash, and was also used for the song's music video.

== Music video ==
The music video, directed by Frank Sacramento, features the band playing the song in a snowy forest and walking around a carnival while certain parts are played at the fair.

== Charts ==
Chart (1994)	Peak position
US Alternative Airplay (Billboard)	12
