= Maria E. Piñeres =

Colombian-born American artist (born 1966)

- Born: 1966 (age 59–60); Medellín, Colombia
- Education: High School of Art and Design; Art Students League of New York; Parsons School of Design
- Known for: Embroidery

Maria E. Piñeres (born 1966) is a Colombian-born American artist who lives and works in Los Angeles, California. Her work, primarily embroidery, has been exhibited at the Museum of Arts and Design in New York City and Scottsdale Museum of Contemporary Art. She studied painting at the Art Students League of New York and graduated from Parsons School of Design with a BFA in illustration.

== Embroidery work ==
Piñeres credits her mother and grandmother for teaching her to sew, knit, and crochet, but she taught herself needlepoint after discovering a book by Mary Martin, an actress and avid needlepointer. The artist's work often consists of homoerotic imagery taken from vintage pin-up magazines combined with vivid, sometimes complex, textile pattern backgrounds.

Piñeres first became widely known through her series of needlepoint celebrity mugshots, which was first exhibited in 2005. This series included portraits of celebrities such as Robert Downey Jr., Paris Hilton, and Michael Jackson, as well as a portrait of Jack White that was later shown in V magazine. Piñeres' interest in the subject came from a desire to show celebrities in vulnerable moments, without the protection of stylists and agents.

Piñeres is an artist mixing contemporary portraits with traditional needlepoint art. She does not make smooth stitches like regular tailor. Instead, she uses vibrant wool yarn and embroidery threads to create a highly textured surface, which looks like pixelated fabric. Her work also has a lot of connections with clothing design. In her portrait series, she often uses classic garment patterns, for example, houndstooth, plaid, and herringbone. She puts these fashion patterns directly onto the peoples skin and background. Her most famous artworks is the 2005 celebrity mugshots series including people, such as Robert Downey Jr. She did not frame the artwork and left the canvas edges raw and messy. This technical choice broke the traditional domestic style of embroidery, making it a powerful work of contemporary art.

Her embroidery was also used commercially for the album art of The Breeders' 1994 EP Head to Toe.

== Exhibitions ==
In 2013, Piñeres' solo exhibition Playland was shown in New York by DCKT Contemporary. Piñeres' needlepoint artwork depicted nude figures combined with attention-grabbing graphics of pinball machine playfields. Piñeres' needlepoint artwork created a sexual and playful atmosphere by combining both the nude figures and pinball machines in the nonoperational Playland. As Dean Dempsey argued, this is where Piñeres makes her connection—the idea that both pursuits are fundamentally concerned with luck and chance. Piñeres exploits the kitsch status of needlepoint to make a statement on contemporary society.

== Technique ==
Piñeres uses several different techniques, including gathering imagery from vintage magazines, digital collages with images collected from the internet, and her own photographs. After some manipulation, the images are embroidered by fusing traditional needlework techniques ranging from a simple continental stitch to more complex bargello and Florentine traditions, which lend rich texture with a modern painterly focus on light and color.
