= Divine Hammer (song) =

1993 single by the Breeders

Single by the Breeders

from the album Last Splash
- B-side: "Hoverin'"; "I Can't Help It (If I'm Still in Love with You)"; "Do You Love Me Now Jr?"
- Released: October 25, 1993
- Label: 4AD; Elektra
- Songwriter: Kim Deal
- Producers: Kim Deal, Mark Freegard (album version); Fred Maher (single version)

The Breeders singles chronology
"Cannonball" (1993)	"Divine Hammer" (1993)	"Saints" (1994)

Music video
- "Divine Hammer" on YouTube "Divine Hammer" (US version) on YouTube

"Divine Hammer" is a song by American alternative rock band the Breeders from their second studio album, Last Splash (1993). It was released as the second single from the album on October 25, 1993.

== Meaning ==
"Divine Hammer" has been interpreted as expressing a search for spiritual or romantic fulfillment—an ultimately unattainable ideal.

Kim Deal, who wrote the song, described it as being about "existential angst," explaining, "I'm just looking for some divinity to come down and, you know what, I don't think there is anything." She noted that while she never used syringe drugs, people often seek transcendence or divinity through various means, including religion. She also criticized the symbolic language commonly used in Christian folk music, calling it "stupid symbolisms."

In a separate interview, she told Rolling Stone that the song was rooted in disillusionment with her religious upbringing: "It's mainly about looking for something so hard through your life that people said was there. When I grew up and went to Sunday school, they said it was going to be really great ... I believe[d] everything everybody told me. And that's why I'm so pissed off now."

== Release ==
In the United Kingdom, "Divine Hammer" was released as a single on October 25, 1993, by 4AD. It was released in Australia on November 8, 1993, by Shock Entertainment and 4AD. This was followed by the release of the song as a CD maxi single in the United States on November 15, 1993, by Elektra Records. Elektra's Faith Henschel identified November 15 as the date the CD maxi would be available to the public, while noting that it had "unfortunately... shipped early—radio has it."

== Reception ==
AllMusic critic Heather Phares described "Divine Hammer" as "two and a half minutes of flirty pop perfection," noting that it contrasted with Last Splash's more experimental tracks such as "Mad Lucas".

Tom Maginnis of AllMusic called the track "the most faithful attempt at pure pop" on the album, highlighting its "hook-laden arrangement with a feel-good vocal melody that belies the song's otherwise weighty subject." He described the instrumentation as featuring "a chiming, three-note riff" with "jangling guitar and a steadily pumping bass line" beneath Kim Deal's "dulcet singsong melody," enhanced by "a constant, tight harmony."

In a review of the EP, Jack Rabid praised the band's cover of Hank Williams' "I Can't Help It (If I'm Still in Love with You)", suggesting it demonstrated their aptitude for country material. However, he criticized the version of "Do You Love Me Now Jr?" featuring J Mascis, calling the result "irritating," and dismissed "Hoverin'" as "just a herky-jerky piece of nothing."

== Music video ==
The music video for Divine Hammer was directed by Spike Jonze, Kim Gordon, and Richard Kern.

== Track listing ==
No.	Title	Writer(s)	Length
1.	"Divine Hammer" (single version)	Kim Deal	2:42
2.	"Hoverin'"	Deal/Murphy	2:53
3.	"I Can't Help It (If I'm Still in Love with You)"	Hank Williams	2:32
4.	"Do You Love Me Now Jr?"	Kim Deal, Kelley Deal (Note: The "Divine Hammer" single liner notes list only Kim Deal as songwriter of "Do You Love Me Now Jr?" while the "Safari" single liner notes give both Kim and Kelley Deal songwriting credit for "Do You Love Me Now?")	3:00

"Divine Hammer" is a different version than the LP version, and "Do You Love Me Now Jr?" is an alternate version of the LP version featuring J Mascis on backing vocals.

== Charts ==
Weekly chart performance for "Divine Hammer"
Chart (1993)	Peak position
UK Singles (Official Charts)	59
US Alternative Airplay (Billboard)	28

== Release history ==
Release dates and formats for "Divine Hammer"
Region	Date	Format(s)	Label(s)	Ref.
United Kingdom	October 25, 1993	7-inch vinyl; 10-inch vinyl; CD; cassette	4AD	
Australia	November 8, 1993	CD; cassette	Shock; 4AD	
United States	November 15, 1993	Maxi-CD	4AD; Elektra	
