= Head to Toe (EP) =

1994 EP by the Breeders

EP by The Breeders
- Released: July 11, 1994
- Length: 8:30
- Labels: Elektra Records; 4AD
- Producer: J Mascis

The Breeders chronology
Last Splash (1993)	Head to Toe (1994)	Live in Stockholm (1994)

Head to Toe is an extended play (EP) by American alternative rock band The Breeders. It was released in July 1994 on Elektra Records and 4AD, peaking at number 68 on the UK Singles Chart. The EP contains a cover of Guided by Voices' "Shocker in Gloomtown," which helped ignite interest in the band. It also contains a cover of Sebadoh's "Freed Pig", a song written by Lou Barlow about former Dinosaur Jr. bandmate J Mascis. The EP's cover art features embroidery work by Colombian-American artist Maria E. Piñeres.

== Track listing ==
No.	Title	Writer(s)	Length
1.	"Head to Toe"	Josephine Wiggs; additional lyrics: Diana Senechal; arranged by Kate Schellenbach	2:06
2.	"Shocker in Gloomtown"	Robert Pollard	1:17
3.	"Freed Pig"	Lou Barlow	2:35
4.	"Saints"	Kim Deal	2:32
