= Ed's Redeeming Qualities =

American alternative folk group

- Genres: Anti-folk
- Years active: 1988-1997, 2011
- Labels: Flying Fish Records; Slow River Records
- Past members: Dani Leone, Dom Leone, Carrie Bradley, Neno Perrotta, Jonah Winter

Ed's Redeeming Qualities was an alternative folk group that was founded in Boston in 1988, and originally consisted of Dani Leone (vocals, ukulele), Dom Leone (vocals, guitar), Carrie Bradley (vocals, violin, guitar, and also of The Breeders), and Neno Perrotta (vocals, percussion). Jonah Winter joined the band for the albums Big Grapefruit Cleanup Job and At the Fish & Game Club.

== History ==
Band members Dani Leone and Carrie Bradley originally met at the University of New Hampshire, and Dani's cousin Dom Leone and friend Neno Perrotta moved to the state from Ohio and Vermont. Their friend and future manager, Ray Halliday, encouraged them to start performing in Boston, which prompted first open mic in 1988 at 1369 Jazz Club in Cambridge's Inman Square. The band became popular on local college radio stations and started hosting cabaret-style shows, called Ed's Basement, at The Rathskeller. Amidst the band's early success, member Dom Leone died of cancer in 1989. After playing in the Boston area for two years, the band moved to San Francisco.

The Boston Globe said of the band: "Ed's was the prototype for the little indie band that could." Of their 1989 album, More Bad Times, Chicago Times critic Bill Wyman said, "I have a feeling More Bad Times is going to be one of those records I get obsessive about."

Their songs were often funny and strange story-songs or character sketches, compared to the style of the Jonathan Richman. Some highlights include Neno's "Lawyers and Truckers" and "Lawn Dart", and Leone's "Spoken Word". The band received some mainstream exposure when The Breeders covered their song "Drivin' on 9" on the album Last Splash. Kim Deal of the Breeders said, "They were really good at what they were doing, but there was a really cool amateur quality that was truly amateur. They were fun, too, sort of like the Pogues — but with more teeth."

In 1996 the band provided the soundtrack to the indie movie Ed's Next Move. Scriptwriter John. C Walsh said, "A friend of mine was in this band called Ed's Redeeming Qualities and I just thought they were hilarious. I’d see them perform at the Mercury Lounge in New York and found myself playing their music fairly frequently during the first draft of the script." It led to Walsh writing the band into the movie, and creating the lead female character of Lee (played by Callie Thorne) as a member of in the band. "There was something about the tone of their music that was wry, offbeat, and slightly bent, but also deeply romantic ultimately," Walsh said. He originally wanted to call the movie "Ed's Redeeming Qualities," but the band asked him not to use their name for the title of the film.

After the band's breakup, Carrie Bradley went on to form the band 100 Watt Smile, which released two albums in the late 1990s, and toured with The Breeders. Dani Leone and Jonah Winter went on to writing careers, and Neno Perrotta published a book of poetry. In 2002, a tribute album to Dom Leone called Guess Who This Is: A Tribute to Dom Leone was released by Portsmouth, New Hampshire-based label Two Ton Santa.

The Presidents of the United States of America borrowed the lyrics and title of the Ed's Redeeming Qualities song "More Bad Times" on their 2008 release These Are the Good Times People, adding a few additional quips and a new musical feel.

== 2011 reunion ==
On January 22, 2011, Ed's Redeeming Qualities played a reunion show at TT the Bear's Place in Cambridge, MA, and recreated the atmosphere of Ed's Basement variety shows that occurred at The Rathskeller in the late 1980s.

== Discography ==
- Ed's Redeeming Qualities (tape)
- Ed's Kitchen (tape) (1988) (reissued on CD in 2011, with contents of Ed's Day and Safe World Record)
- Ed's Day (EP) (1989)
- More Bad Times (1990)
- It's All Good News (1991)
- Safe World Record (EP) (1992)
- Static & Weak Tea (tape) (1993)
- Big Grapefruit Clean-Up Job (live) (1995)
- Ed's Next Move (1996)
- At the Fish and Game Club (1996)
- Guess Who This Is – A Tribute to Dom Leone (tribute album with covers of various ERQ songs) (2001)
