= Safari (EP) =

EP by the Breeders
- Released: April 6, 1992
- Studios: Looking Glass, New York City, First Protocol, London and Nomis
- Genre: Alternative rock
- Length: 12:08
- Label: 4AD/Elektra
- Producers: Paul Berry, Dante DeSole, Guy Fixsen

The Breeders chronology
Pod (1990)	Safari (1992)	Last Splash (1993)

Professional ratings
Review scores
Source	Rating
AllMusic	3.5/5 stars
Robert Christgau	A−
The New Rolling Stone Album Guide	3/5 stars
Spin	3/5 stars

Safari is an EP by the Breeders, released in 1992 on 4AD/Elektra Records. By the time of its release, Kim Deal had enlisted her twin sister Kelley to play guitar for the band. It is the only Breeders recording that features both Kelley Deal and Tanya Donelly.

== Track listing ==
No.	Title	Writer(s)	Length
1.	"Do You Love Me Now?"	Kim Deal, Kelley Deal	2:40
2.	"Don't Call Home"	Kim Deal; additional lyrics: John Murphy	3:37
3.	"Safari"	Kim Deal	3:30
4.	"So Sad About Us"	Pete Townshend	2:21

== Personnel ==
The Breeders

- Kim Deal – vocals, guitar
- Kelley Deal – guitar
- Tanya Donelly – vocals, guitar
- Josephine Wiggs – vocals, bass, cello
- Britt Walford (billed as Mike Hunt) – Drums
- Jon Mattock – drums on "Safari"

Technical

- Paul Berry, Dante DeSole, Guy Fixsen, Mark Freegard and Ben Darlow – engineers
- Vaughan Oliver – sleeve
- Shinro Ohtake - charcoal drawing "Nairobi Viii" (1983)
