= Last Splash =

1993 studio album by the Breeders

Studio album by the Breeders
- Released: August 30, 1993
- Recorded: 1990–93
- Studios: Coast Recorders, San Francisco; Brilliant Studios, San Francisco; Refraze, Dayton
- Genres: Alternative rock; surf rock; grunge
- Length: 39:38
- Label: 4AD/Elektra
- Producers: Kim Deal; Mark Freegard

The Breeders chronology
Safari (1992)	Last Splash (1993)	Head to Toe (1994)

Singles from Last Splash
- 1. "Cannonball" Released: August 9, 1993; 2. "Divine Hammer" Released: October 25, 1993; 3. "Saints" Released: 1994; 4. "No Aloha" Released: 1994

Professional ratings
Contemporary reviews
Review scores
Source	Rating
Chicago Tribune	3.5/4 stars
Entertainment Weekly	A−
Rolling Stone	3.5/5 stars
The Village Voice	A−

Last Splash is the second studio album by American alternative rock band the Breeders, released on August 30, 1993. Originally formed as a side project for Pixies bassist Kim Deal, the Breeders quickly became her primary recording outlet. Last Splash peaked at number 33 on the Billboard 200 albums chart, and by June 1994, the album had been certified platinum by the Recording Industry Association of America (RIAA) for shipments in excess of one million units.

The title of the album is taken from a line in the lyric of its lead single, "Cannonball". The video for "Cannonball" was directed by Spike Jonze and Kim Gordon, and the video for the album's second single "Divine Hammer" was directed by Jonze, Gordon and Richard Kern. A looped guitar sample of "S.O.S." was used by the English electronic music band the Prodigy in their 1996 hit single "Firestarter". A sample from "I Just Wanna Get Along" was used in another track by the Prodigy called "World's on Fire" from the Invaders Must Die album.

In 2003, Pitchfork listed the album at number 64 on their list of the Top 100 Albums of the 1990s. In 2020, Rolling Stone ranked the album number 293 in their revised list of the 500 Greatest Albums of All Time (after not including it in the original 2003 list or the 2012 revision). On May 13, 2013, 4AD released LSXX, a deluxe 20th anniversary version of the album, and on September 22, 2023, 4AD released Last Splash (30th Anniversary Original Analog Edition), with additional tracks "Go Man Go" and "Divine Mascis".

== Recording ==
The album was recorded at Coast Recorders in San Francisco, with additional recording at Brilliant Studios in San Francisco and Refraze Recording Studios in Dayton, Ohio. It was mixed at Record Plant in Sausalito, California.

The Breeders recorded demos at Cro-Magnon Studios in Dayton, Ohio before traveling to San Francisco to record the album. Riley Fitzgerald writes in Happy Mag: "Recorded primarily at Coast Recorders, songs were meticulously recorded, scrapped, revised and reworked. A three-week session turned into a grinding four months. Burgeoning hard drug habits were also at play, perhaps contributing to Kim attacking the recording sessions with manic creative energy and relentless perfectionism."

Engineer and co-producer Mark Freegard recalled: "The project became one big edit, but no computer in sight. Kim wouldn’t have it."

Kim Deal was somewhat dissatisfied with the small room and dry sound of Coast Recorders' recording space. She recorded a lot of her vocals in the studio toilet, according to Freegard: "We actually recorded quite a lot of the vocals in this toilet at Coast Recorders in San Francisco. Kim Deal really loved it in there. Anyway, it had a really good sound." Kelley Deal also used the toilet for her lead guitar sound on "Mad Lucas", running it through an Auratone speaker miked up in the toilet.

The rhythm guitar parts were recorded with Kim Deal's Seagull acoustic guitar run through a 100-watt Marshall 900 series amplifier, doubled with a Les Paul 1958 Goldtop played through a Vox amp. Other equipment used included a Gibson hollowbody guitar, a Fender Stratocaster, a Roland JC-120 amplifier, and various Boss distortion and reverb pedals. Kim told Guitar World in 1994: "It almost doesn’t matter what kind of acoustic guitar you use. All that matters is how the graphic EQ and electronics are."

The sessions showed a spirit of experimentation. Kim Deal sang "Cannonball"'s backing vocal through a harmonica microphone. Kelley Deal brought her Kenmore sewing machine to the studio, and spent downtime working on a quilt. Kim told Mojo in 2013: "So I’d listen to her sewing, and I thought, we should mike that up." Kelley's sewing machine was recorded and run through a Marshall amplifier, appearing in the transition from the end of "Divine Hammer" to the start of "S.O.S.". Bassist Josephine Wiggs is credited with playing drums on "Roi", as well as cello. For at least one song, Freegard was tasked with making the vocals sound like a "bad cassette".

Kim Deal commented in 1996: "Usually, I tend to spend more time with the instruments. Last Splash had quite a few instrumentals and quite a few songs where I might say five words." "Roi" and "Roi (reprise)" are mostly instrumental with one sung line, and "Flipside" and "S.O.S." are entirely instrumental.

== Composition ==
Last Splash has been categorized as alternative rock, as well as indie rock, noise pop and "effervescent" pop rock. It is also considered "wildly", "willingly" experimental, sporting art rock textures, "pure", "twisted" pop, and Hawaiian surf music. The latter genre is seen in the "tiki bar twang" of "No Aloha" and the "gonzo" surf rock of instrumental "Flipside". "I Just Wanna Get Along" takes on "spiky" pop-punk, while cover "Drivin' on 9" pulls in acoustic and country sounds.

== Legacy and impact ==
Professional ratings
Retrospective reviews
Review scores
Source	Rating
AllMusic	4/5 stars
Blender	4/5 stars
Drowned in Sound	7/10
The Encyclopedia of Popular Music	3/5 stars
The Great Rock Discography	9/10
MusicHound Rock	4/5 stars
The Rolling Stone Album Guide	4.5/5 stars
Spin	(2008); 9/10 (2013)
Spin Alternative Record Guide	9/10
Tom Hull – on the Web	B+

Professional ratings
LSXX (20th anniversary edition)
Aggregate scores
Source	Rating
Metacritic	86/100
Review scores
Source	Rating
American Songwriter	4/5 stars
Louder Than War	10/10
Paste	8.9/10
Pitchfork	9.0/10
PopMatters	7/10 stars
Record Collector	4/5 stars
Rolling Stone	4/5 stars
Uncut	4.5/5 stars

Dubbed one of the "most enduring masterpieces" of alternative rock, Last Splash has been praised for "perfectly encapsulat[ing] all that was great and wonderful" about the genre's explosion in that era. Nashville Scene's Sean L. Maloney saw Splash both "[distill] the zeitgeist into perfect alt-pop nuggets", but also serve as "the last gasp of alternative music as an actual alternative to the mainstream". The Quietus' Emily Mackay considered it "a key album" for the genre's mainstream crossover.

In a retrospective review of it 20 years on, Stereogum's Tom Breihan called it "a warm, homemade, deeply and consciously odd" record.

=== Accolades ===
Critical rankings for Last Splash
Publication	Country	Type	List	Year	Rank	Ref.
Pitchfork	United States	Decade-end	Top 100 Favorite Records of the 1990s	2003	64	
Slant Magazine	United States	Decade-end	The 50 Best Rock Albums of the '90s	2021	46	
Spin	United States	Decade-end	The 90 Greatest Albums Of The '90s	2021	39	
Treble	United States	Decade-end	91 Essential Alternative Rock Albums of the '90s	2023	--	
Stylus Magazine	United States	All-time	Top 101-200 Albums of All time	2004	162	
Rolling Stone	United States	All-time	Women Who Rock: The 50 Greatest Albums of All Time	2012	49	
Rolling Stone	United States	All-time	The 500 Greatest Albums of All Time	2020	293	
NME	United Kingdom	All-time	The 500 Greatest Albums of All Time	2013	200	
NPR Music	United States	All-time	The 150 Greatest Albums Made By Women	2017	144	
Paste	United States	All-time	The 300 Greatest Albums of All Time	2024	122	
"--" indicates an unordered list.

== Track listing ==
=== Original 1993 release ===
All tracks are written by Kim Deal, except where noted.

No.	Title	Writer(s)	Length
1.	"New Year"		1:56
2.	"Cannonball"		3:33
3.	"Invisible Man"		2:48
4.	"No Aloha"		2:07
5.	"Roi"		4:11
6.	"Do You Love Me Now?"	Kim Deal; Kelley Deal	3:01
7.	"Flipside"		1:59
8.	"I Just Wanna Get Along"	Kim Deal; Kelley Deal	1:44
9.	"Mad Lucas"		4:36
10.	"Divine Hammer"		2:41
11.	"S.O.S."		1:31
12.	"Hag"		2:55
13.	"Saints"		2:32
14.	"Drivin' on 9"	Dom Leone; Steve Hickoff	3:22
15.	"Roi (Reprise)"		0:42

=== LSXX track listing ===
There are two versions of LSXX: a 3-CD package and a 7-disc vinyl set. The CD and vinyl formats have the same track listings.

The vinyl set contains the following vinyl:

1. Last Splash
2. "The Stockholm Syndrome" (partially previously released as Live in Stockholm 1994)
3. Demos, rare tracks & session versions
4. Safari EP
5. Cannonball EP
6. Divine Hammer
7. Head to Toe EP

The track listing below is for the 3-CD set. All songs are by Kim Deal except where noted.

Disc 1 – Last Splash

The first disc contains the original release track listing.

Disc 2 – Singles, B-Sides, and Demos
No.	Title	Writer(s)	Length
1.	"Do You Love Me Now?" (previously released on "Safari" EP)	Kim Deal, Kelley Deal
2.	"Don't Call Home" (previously released on "Safari" EP)	Kim Deal, John Murphy
3.	"Safari" (previously released on "Safari" EP)
4.	"So Sad About Us" (previously released on "Safari" EP)	Pete Townshend
5.	"Cro-Aloha" (previously released on the "Cannonball" single)
6.	"Lord of the Thighs" (previously released on the "Cannonball" single)	Steven Tyler
7.	"900" (previously released on the "Cannonball" single)	Josephine Wiggs
8.	"Divine Hammer (Single Version)" (previously released on the "Divine Hammer" single)
9.	"Hoverin'" (previously released on the "Divine Hammer" single)	Kim Deal, John Murphy
10.	"I Can't Help It (If I'm Still in Love with You)" (previously released on the "Divine Hammer" single)	Hank Williams
11.	"Do You Love Me Now Jr?" (previously released on the "Divine Hammer" single)	Kim Deal, Kelley Deal
12.	"Head to Toe" (previously released on the "Head to Toe" EP)	Josephine Wiggs
13.	"Shocker in Gloomtown" (previously released on the "Head to Toe" EP)	Robert Pollard
14.	"Freed Pig" (Sebadoh cover previously released on the "Head to Toe" EP)	Lou Barlow
15.	"Saints (Head to Toe Version)" (Last Splash demo, November 1992)
16.	"New Year" (Last Splash demo, November 1992)		2:04
17.	"Grunggae" (Last Splash demo, November 1992)		2:34
18.	"Invisible Man" (Last Splash demo, previously released on the "13 Year Itch" 4AD compilation CD)		2:44
19.	"No Aloha" (Last Splash demo, November 1992)		2:34
20.	"I Just Wanna Get Along" (Last Splash demo, November 1992)	Kim Deal, Kelley Deal	1:41
21.	"Mad Lucas" (Last Splash demo, November 1992)		2:29
22.	"S.O.S." (Last Splash demo, November 1992)		1:37
23.	"Saints" (Last Splash demo, November 1992)		2:10
24.	"900" (Last Splash demo, November 1992)	Josephine Wiggs	3:15
25.	"Iris (Live Version)" (previously released on the No Alternative compilation)		3:44

Disc 3 – Live in Stockholm & BBC Sessions
No.	Title	Writer(s)	Length
1.	"Shocker in Gloomtown" (Live in Stockholm)	Robert Pollard	2:20
2.	"New Year" (Live in Stockholm)		2:05
3.	"Hellbound" (Live in Stockholm)		2:24
4.	"Saints" (Live in Stockholm)		2:31
5.	"Hag" (Live in Stockholm)		3:44
6.	"I Just Wanna Get Along" (Live in Stockholm)	Kim Deal, Kelley Deal	1:52
7.	"S.O.S." (Live in Stockholm)		1:44
8.	"Roi" (Live in Stockholm)		2:35
9.	"Head to Toe" (Live in Stockholm)	Josephine Wiggs	2:18
10.	"Happiness Is a Warm Gun" (Live in Stockholm)	John Lennon, Paul McCartney	2:28
11.	"Cannonball" (Live in Stockholm)		3:49
12.	"Invisible Man" (Live in Stockholm)		2:50
13.	"Doe" (Live in Stockholm)	Kim Deal, Ray Halliday	2:39
14.	"Drivin' on 9" (Live in Stockholm)	Dom Leone, Steve Hickoff	3:55
15.	"Don't Call Home" (Live in Stockholm)	Kim Deal, John Murphy	3:20
16.	"Limehouse" (Live in Stockholm)		1:52
17.	"No Aloha" (BBC Session)		2:26
18.	"Flipside" (BBC Session)		1:58
19.	"Divine Hammer" (BBC Session)		2:36
20.	"Hag" (BBC Session)		2:33

== Personnel ==
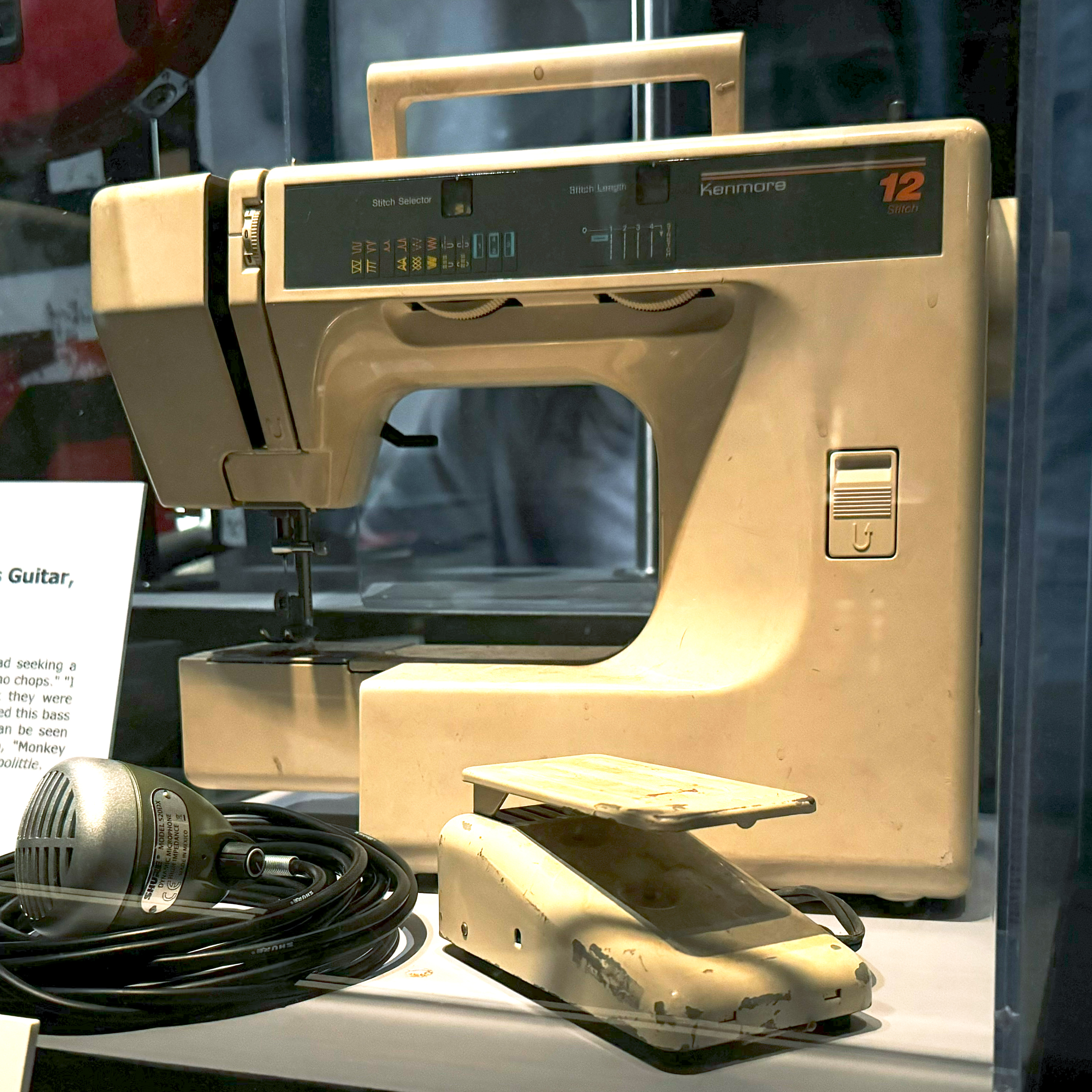
The Kenmore sewing machine from Kelley Deal's unusual performance credit (on "S.O.S."). On display at the Rock and Roll Hall of Fame.

The Breeders

- Kim Deal – lead vocals, guitar, Moog, Casiotone
- Kelley Deal – guitar, Kenmore 12-stitch, lap steel, mandolin, vocals, lead vocals on "I Just Wanna Get Along"
- Jim MacPherson – drums
- Josephine Wiggs – bass guitar, double bass, vocals, cello, drums on "Roi"

Artwork

- Jason Love – photography
- Paul McMenamin – design assistant
- Vaughan Oliver – art direction, design
- Kevin Westenberg – portraits

Additional musicians

- Carrie Bradley – violin, additional vocals

Production

- Kim Deal – producer
- Mark Freegard – production, engineering
- Sean Leonard – assistant engineering
- Daniel Presley – engineering on "Divine Hammer"
- Andy Taub – assistant engineering

== Chart positions ==
Chart (1993)	Peak position
Australian ARIA Albums Chart	22
Canadian Albums Chart	44
Dutch Top 100	41
German Albums Chart	68
Swedish Albums Chart	43
UK Albums Chart	5
US Billboard 200	33
Chart (1994)	Peak position
New Zealand RIANZ Albums Chart	11
Chart (2025)	Peak position
Croatian International Albums (HDU)	15

=== Singles ===
Year	Single	Peak positions						
Year	Single	US Main	US Main Rock	US Mod Rock	AUS	FR	NLD	UK
1993	"Cannonball"	44	32	2	58	8	35	40
1993	"Divine Hammer"	—	—	28	—	—	—	59
1994	"Saints"	—	—	12	—	—	—	—
"—" denotes a release that did not chart.

=== Certifications ===
Region	Certification	Certified units/sales
Australia (ARIA)	Gold	35,000^{^}
Canada (Music Canada)	Gold	50,000^{^}
France (SNEP)	Gold	100,000^{*}
United Kingdom (BPI)	Silver	60,000^{^}
United States (RIAA)	Platinum	1,000,000^{^}
^{*} Sales figures based on certification alone.^{^} Shipments figures based on certification alone.
