= Live in Stockholm 1994 =

1994 live album by the Breeders

Live in Stockholm

Live album by the Breeders
- Released: 1994
- Recorded: May 17, 1994
- Venue: Club Gino, Stockholm, Sweden
- Genre: Alternative rock
- Length: 20:05
- Language: English
- Label: Breeders

The Breeders chronology
Last Splash (1993)	Live in Stockholm (1994)	Title TK (2002)

Professional ratings
Review scores
Source	Rating
AllMusic	2.5/5 stars
Encyclopedia of Popular Music	3/5 stars

Live in Stockholm is a live album by the American alternative rock band the Breeders. It was released in 1994 exclusively through the band's fan club, Breeders Digest, and includes eight tracks recorded during a performance at Club Gino in Stockholm, Sweden, on May 17, 1994.

== Track listing ==
All tracks are written by Kim Deal, except where noted.

No.	Title	Writer(s)	Length
1.	"Shocker in Gloomtown"	Guided by Voices	2:56
2.	"New Year"		2:06
3.	"Hellbound"		2:19
4.	"Saints"		3:25
5.	"I Just Want to Get Along"	Kim Deal; Kelley Deal	2:19
6.	"SOS"		1:30
7.	"Roi"		2:34
8.	"No Aloha"		2:56
Total length:			20:05

== Personnel ==
- Kim Deal – guitar, vocals
- Kelley Deal – guitar, vocals
- Josephine Wiggs – bass, vocals
- Jim MacPherson – drums
