= Cannonball (The Breeders song) =

1993 single by the Breeders

Single by the Breeders

from the album Last Splash
- B-side: "Cro-Aloha"; "Lord of the Thighs"; "900"
- Released: August 9, 1993
- Genre: Alternative rock; pop rock; indie pop; grunge
- Length: 3:36
- Label: 4AD; Elektra
- Songwriter: Kim Deal
- Producers: Kim Deal; Mark Freegard

The Breeders singles chronology
"Cannonball" (1993)	"Divine Hammer" (1993)

Music video
- "Cannonball" on YouTube

"Cannonball" is a song by American alternative rock band the Breeders from their second studio album, Last Splash (1993). It was released as a single on August 9, 1993, reaching No. 44 on the US Billboard Hot 100 and No. 40 on the UK Singles Chart. In November 1993, the single was released in France, where it charted for 30 weeks, peaking at No. 8. The song demo was originally called "Grunggae" as it merged "island riffs and grunge". This demo was later included in the 20th anniversary re-release of the album LSXX in 2013.

== Recording ==
The rhythm of the introduction is constructed from metallic clicking on a snare rim and cymbal stand, which is tapped out by the Breeders drummer Jim McPherson. The loud, distorted voice of Kim Deal at the beginning of the song was achieved by singing closely into a harmonica microphone, which can also be seen in most live performances.

== Composition ==
"Cannonball" is an alternative rock, pop rock, indie pop, and grunge song that lasts three minutes and 36 seconds. According to the sheet music published at Musicnotes.com by EMI Music Publishing, the song is written in the time signature of common time, with a moderately fast rock tempo of 112 beats per minute and composed in the key of E-flat major (E♭), while Kim Deal's vocal range spans from a low of E♭_{3} to a high of B♭_{4}. The song has a basic sequence that alternates between the chords of B♭_{5} and E♭_{5} during the introduction and verses and follows B♭_{5}–E♭_{5}–A♭_{5} at the chorus as its chord progression.

In a 1996 interview with the Phoenix New Times, Deal stated the song was inspired by the writings of French revolutionary Marquis de Sade.

== Reception ==
As the lead single from their second album, "Cannonball" went on to become the Breeders' biggest commercial success. NME, Melody Maker and The Village Voice's Pazz & Jop annual year-end critics' poll all named it best single of 1993, which helped propel the album Last Splash to platinum status. AllMusic's Tom Maginnis complimented the single, writing, "the song conveys an effusive energy, balancing quirky hooks with a gushing power, supporting playful, goofball lyrics that perfectly deliver the song's sense of unhinged, freewheeling fun".

In May 2007, NME placed "Cannonball" at No. 22 in its list of the "50 Greatest Indie Anthems Ever". It ranked No. 83 on VH1's "100 Greatest Songs of the 90s". In September 2010, Pitchfork Media included the song at No. 22 on their "Top 200 Tracks of the 90s". In September 2021, "Cannonball" was ranked at No. 489 on the updated list of Rolling Stone's 500 Greatest Songs of All Time. Paste named it the 31st best song of the 1990s.

== Music video ==
The music video for "Cannonball" was directed by Kim Gordon and Spike Jonze. It features the band in a garage, and Kim and Kelley Deal in what seems to be a dressing room trashed with clothes, sitting in a chair together. There are also shots of a cannonball rolling through Miracle Mile, Los Angeles, as well as a shot of Kim Deal singing underwater.

== Track listings ==
All songs were written by Kim Deal except where noted.

- Standard CD and 12-inch single
1. "Cannonball" – 3:33
2. "Cro-Aloha" – 2:15
3. "Lord of the Thighs" (Steven Tyler) – 3:58
4. "900" (Josephine Wiggs) – 4:27
- US cassette single
1. "Cannonball" – 3:33
2. "Lord of the Thighs" (Tyler) – 3:58
3. "Cro-Aloha" – 2:15
- French CD and cassette single
1. "Cannonball" – 3:33
2. "Cro-Aloha" – 2:15

Note: "Cro-Aloha" is a demo version of "No Aloha" from Last Splash.

== Personnel ==
- Guitars and lead vocals: Kelley Deal and Kim Deal
- Bass and vocals: Josephine Wiggs
- Drums: Jim MacPherson
- Artwork by Paul McMenamin
- Design by Vaughan Oliver
- Photography by Jason Love
- Recorded at Coast Recorders, San Francisco; Cro-Magnon, Dayton; Refraze, Dayton

== Charts ==
=== Weekly charts ===
Weekly chart performance for "Cannonball"
Chart (1993–1994)	Peak position
Australia (ARIA)	58
Europe (Eurochart Hot 100)	56
France (SNEP)	8
Netherlands (Dutch Top 40 Tipparade)	12
Netherlands (Single Top 100)	35
UK Singles (Official Charts)	40
US Billboard Hot 100	44
US Alternative Airplay (Billboard)	2
US Mainstream Rock Airplay (Billboard)	32
US Pop Airplay (Billboard)	39
US Cash Box Top 100	45

=== Year-end charts ===
1993 year-end chart performance for "Cannonball"
Chart (1993)	Position
US Modern Rock Tracks (Billboard)	11

1994 year-end chart performance for "Cannonball"
Chart (1994)	Position
France (SNEP)	20

== Certifications ==
Certifications for "Cannonball"
Region	Certification	Certified units/sales
France (SNEP)	Gold	250,000^{*}
United States (RIAA)	Gold	500,000^{‡}
United Kingdom (BPI)	Silver	200,000^{‡}
^{*} Sales figures based on certification alone.^{‡} Sales+streaming figures based on certification alone.

== Release history ==
Release dates and formats for "Cannonball"
Region	Date	Format(s)	Label(s)	Ref.
Australia	August 9, 1993	12-inch vinyl; CD	Shock; 4AD	
United Kingdom	August 9, 1993	12-inch vinyl; CD	4AD	
United States	August 1993 (Note: Specifically, the second week of August 1993.)	Radio	4AD; Elektra	
France	November 9, 1993	CD; cassette	4AD	

== Usage in media ==
"Cannonball" was featured in a preview for the 1999 film South Park: Bigger, Longer and Uncut, the 1995 film Moonlight and Valentino, the opening scene of the 2002 film A Walk to Remember as well as in the heist scene of the 2001 film Sugar & Spice. It was the original televised score to a sketch on MTV's sketch comedy show The State, but due to music licensing issues had to be re-recorded with a sound-alike song for the DVD. The song was also featured in the third season in episode 3 in Misfits in 2011 and in the season six finale "Radioactive" of True Blood in 2013. The band Phish covered the song during their May 7, 1994, concert in Dallas, Texas, which was later released commercially as Live Phish Volume 18 in 2003. In 2000, Nissan used the song in a commercial for the Sentra. Courtney Barnett performed the song on The A.V. Club in 2014 for their Undercover live music web series and during her 2015 US tour. At the A.V. Club performance, Barnett stated "I chose it 'cause I love that album, and when we went to make [Sometimes I Sit and Think, and Sometimes I Just Sit] recently, I put that song on for the first day of recording — just to psych me up".
