= Kim Deal =

American musician (born 1961)

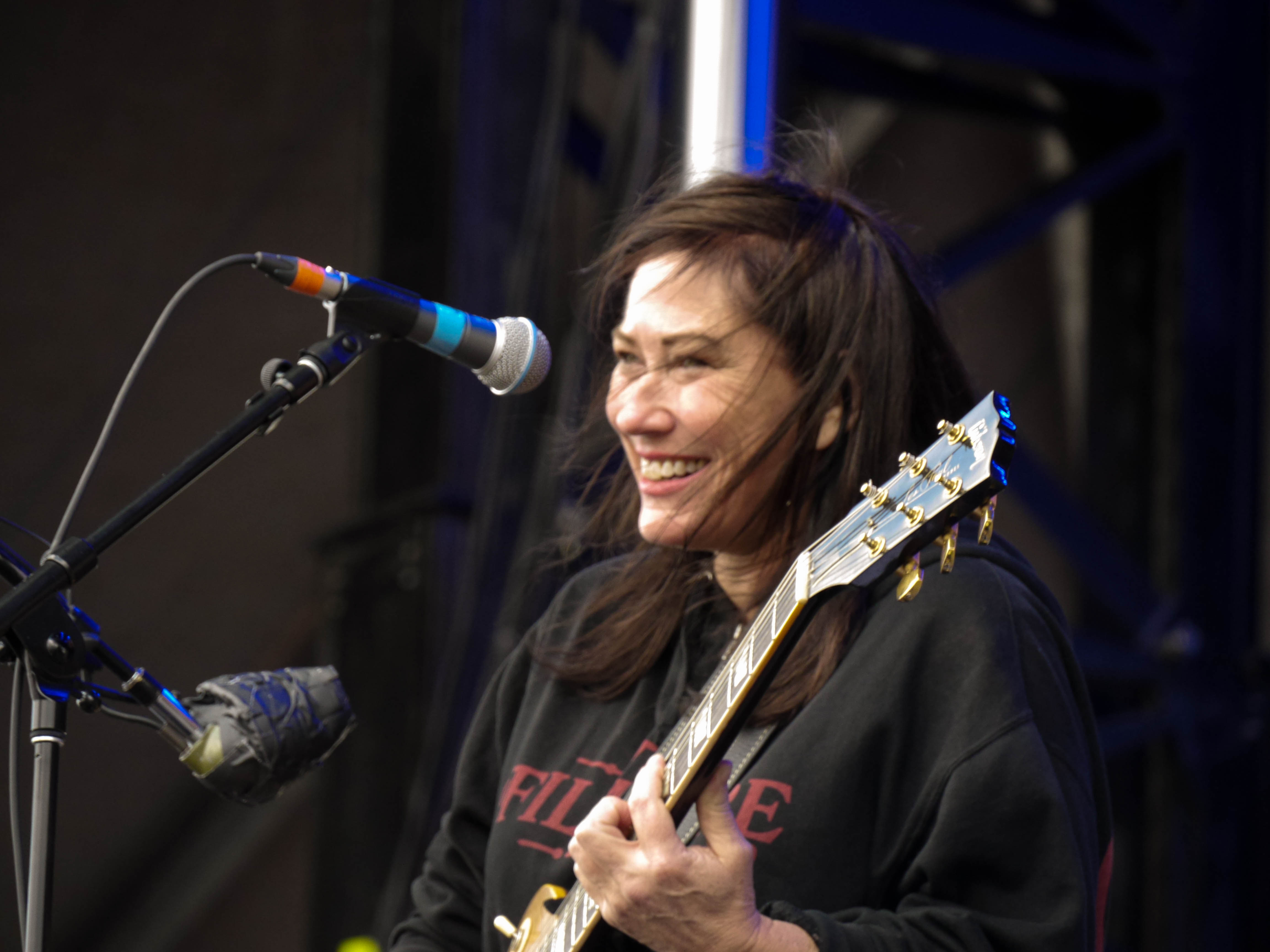
- Deal performing with the Breeders in 2018
- Born: Kimberley Ann Deal; June 10, 1961 (age 65); Dayton, Ohio, U.S.
- Other names: Mrs. John Murphy; Tammy Ampersand
- Education: Kettering College
- Occupations: Musician; singer; songwriter
- Years active: 1986–present
- Spouse: John Murphy (m. 1985; div. 1988)
- Relatives: Kelley Deal (twin sister)
- Musical career
- Genres: Alternative rock; noise pop
- Instruments: Vocals; guitar; bass; keyboards; drums
- Labels: 4AD; Elektra
- Member of: The Breeders
- Formerly of: Pixies; The Amps
- Website: kimdealmusic.com

Kimberley Ann Deal (born June 10, 1961) is an American singer and rock musician who is the lead vocalist and rhythm guitarist of the Breeders, and was the original bassist and co-vocalist of the alternative rock band the Pixies.

Deal joined the Pixies in January 1986, adopting the stage name Mrs. John Murphy for the albums Come on Pilgrim and Surfer Rosa. Following Doolittle and the Pixies' hiatus, she formed the Breeders with Tanya Donelly of Throwing Muses, Josephine Wiggs of the Perfect Disaster, and Britt Walford of Slint; following the band's debut album Pod, her twin sister Kelley Deal replaced Donelly and Jim Macpherson replaced Walford.

The Pixies broke up in early 1993, and Deal returned her focus to the Breeders, who released the platinum-selling album Last Splash in 1993, featuring the popular single "Cannonball". In 1994, the Breeders went on hiatus after Kelley entered drug rehabilitation. During the hiatus, Deal adopted the stage name Tammy Ampersand and formed the short-lived band the Amps, recording a single album, Pacer, in 1995. After her own stint in drug rehabilitation, Deal reformed the Breeders with a new lineup for Title TK in 2002 and Mountain Battles in 2008.

Deal reunited with the Pixies in 2004, and left in 2013 to concentrate on the Breeders, who toured for the 20th anniversary of Last Splash. In 2018, the Breeders released their fifth album, All Nerve, their first to reunite the Deals, Wiggs, and Macpherson since Last Splash. In 2024, Deal released her debut solo album, Nobody Loves You More.

== Early life ==
Deal was born in Dayton, Ohio, United States. Both her parents were from coal mining areas of West Virginia. Her father was a laser physicist who worked at the nearby Wright-Patterson Air Force Base. Kim and her identical twin sister Kelley were introduced to music at a young age; the two sang to a "two-track, quarter-inch, tape" when they were "four or five" years old, and grew up listening to hard rock bands such as AC/DC and Led Zeppelin. When Deal was 11, she learned Roger Miller's "King of the Road" on the acoustic guitar. Attending Wayne High School in suburban Huber Heights, she was a cheerleader and often got into conflicts with authority. "We were popular girls," according to Kelley. "We got good grades and played sports." Still, growing up in Dayton was "like living in Russia," according to Kim. A friend of Kelley's living in California sent the Deals cassettes of artists such as James Blood Ulmer, the Undertones, Elvis Costello, Sex Pistols and Siouxsie and the Banshees. "These tapes were our most treasured possession, the only link with civilization," Kim later recalled.

As a teenager, she formed a folk rock band with her sister. She then became a prolific songwriter, as she found it easier to write songs than cover them. Deal later commented on her songwriting output: "I got like a hundred songs when I was like 16, 17 ... The music is pretty good, but the lyrics are just like, OH MY GOD [sic]. We were just trying to figure out how blue rhymes with you. When I was writing them, they didn't have anything to do with who I was." The Deals bought microphones, an eight-track tape recorder, a mixer, speakers, and amps for a bedroom studio. According to Kelley, the two "had the whole thing set up by the time we were 17." They later bought a drum machine "so it would feel like we were more in a band."

Deal attended seven different colleges following high school, including Ohio State University, but did not graduate from any of them. She eventually earned an associate degree in medical technology from Kettering College and took several jobs in cellular biology, including working in a hospital laboratory and a biochemical lab.

== Musical career ==
=== The Pixies ===
Deal became the bassist and backing vocalist for the Pixies in January 1986, after answering an advertisement in the Boston Phoenix that read, "Band seeks bassist into Hüsker Dü and Peter, Paul and Mary. Please – no chops." Deal's was the only response, even though her main instrument was guitar; she borrowed Kelley's bass guitar to use in the band. To complete the lineup, she suggested they hire David Lovering, a friend of her husband whom she had met at their wedding reception, as drummer. For the release of the band's first recording, Come on Pilgrim (1987), Deal used the nom de disque "Mrs. John Murphy" in the liner notes, chosen as an ironic feminist joke, after conversing with a woman who wished to be called only by her husband's name.

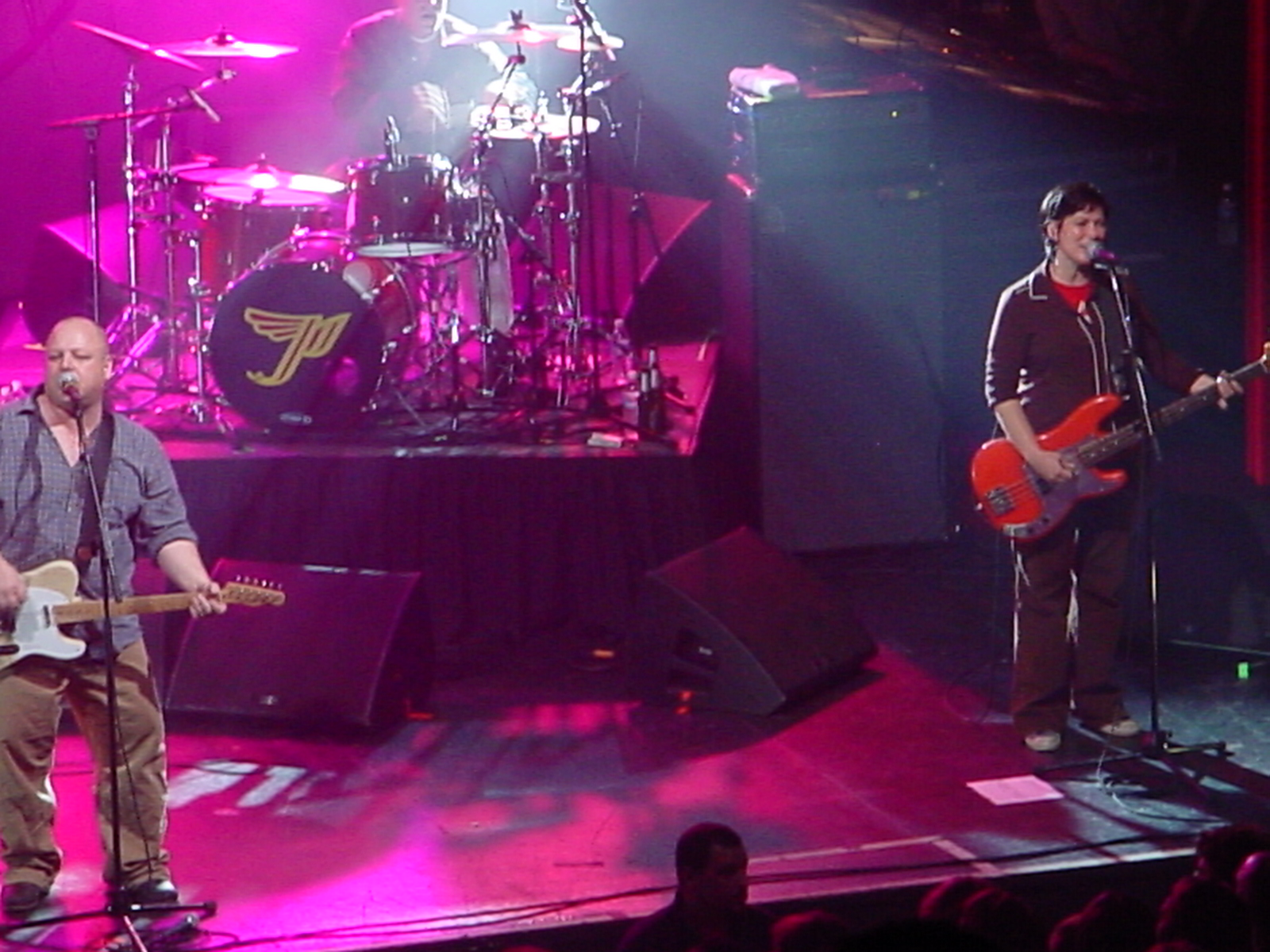
Deal (right) and Black Francis performing in a 2004 Pixies concert

For Surfer Rosa (1988), Deal sang lead vocals on the album's only single, "Gigantic", which she co-wrote with frontman Black Francis. Doolittle followed a year later, with Deal contributing the song "Silver". By this time, however, tensions began to develop between her and Francis, which marred the album's recording sessions. Deal commented that the sessions "went from just all fun to work." Exhaustion from releasing three records in two years and constant touring further contributed to intra-band friction. The tension and exhaustion culminated at the end of the US "Fuck or Fight" tour, where they were too tired to attend the end-of-tour party. The band soon announced a hiatus.

=== The Breeders ===
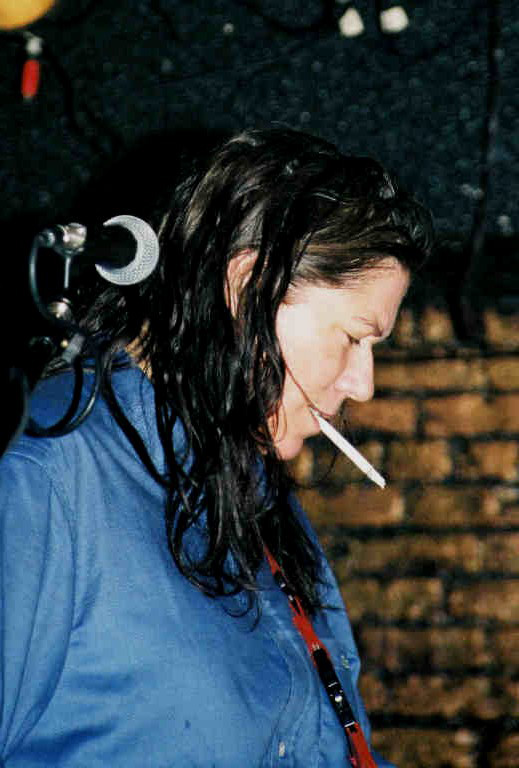
Deal performing with the Breeders, c. 2002

"Iris"
The eighth track of Pod, this album version sample contains the chorus.

During a 1988 Pixies tour of Europe with Throwing Muses, Deal began to write new material. As neither band had plans for the short term, Deal discussed possible side projects with Throwing Muses guitarist Tanya Donelly. After rejecting the idea of creating a dance album together, the pair decided to form a new band. Deal named the band the Breeders, after the folk band she formed with Kelley as a teenager, and they recruited Carrie Bradley, violinist and vocalist in Ed's Redeeming Qualities, to record a short demo tape.

The Breeders' demo was sent to 4AD head Ivo Watts-Russell, who immediately signed them to the label. The Breeders allowed Deal to become more active in songwriting, and their debut album, Pod (1990), written primarily by Deal, was recorded in Edinburgh by Surfer Rosa producer Steve Albini. Pod was praised by contemporaries; Nirvana frontman Kurt Cobain later named the album one of his favorites and remarked that "I wish Kim was allowed to write more songs for the Pixies."

=== Bossanova and Trompe le Monde ===
Deal returned to the US after the recording of Pod, but was then fired from the Pixies. Regardless, she flew out to Los Angeles, where the other members of the band had moved, to meet them, and was accepted back into the band to record Bossanova (1990).

The band's final studio album was Trompe le Monde (1991). The recording sessions were fractious, and the whole band was hardly ever together during the process.

Deal rarely sang on the band's songs during this time; one of the few tracks she sang on was a cover of Neil Young's "I've Been Waiting for You" (sample). Deal did sing on Trompe le Monde, on songs such as "Alec Eiffel", but did not write any material for the album.

=== Last Splash ===
A year after the Pixies' breakup, Kelley Deal joined the Breeders on lead guitar, replacing Donelly, and the band released Last Splash to critical acclaim and considerable commercial success. The record went platinum within a year of its release.

At the height of the Breeders' popularity in the early to mid-1990s, the band scored a number of hit music videos featured heavily on MTV, including "Cannonball", "Safari", "Divine Hammer", and "Saints." The band also released the vinyl-only "Head to Toe" 10-inch EP during the summer of 1994, when they appeared on the main stage of Lollapalooza. Although the band went into stasis in 1994 when Kelley Deal entered rehab for a heroin addiction, they never officially split up, and in 2002 released Title TK. (Note: TK is a copyediting mark meaning "to come" and is often used when editing drafts to indicate missing information.)

=== 1995–2004: The Amps and other projects ===
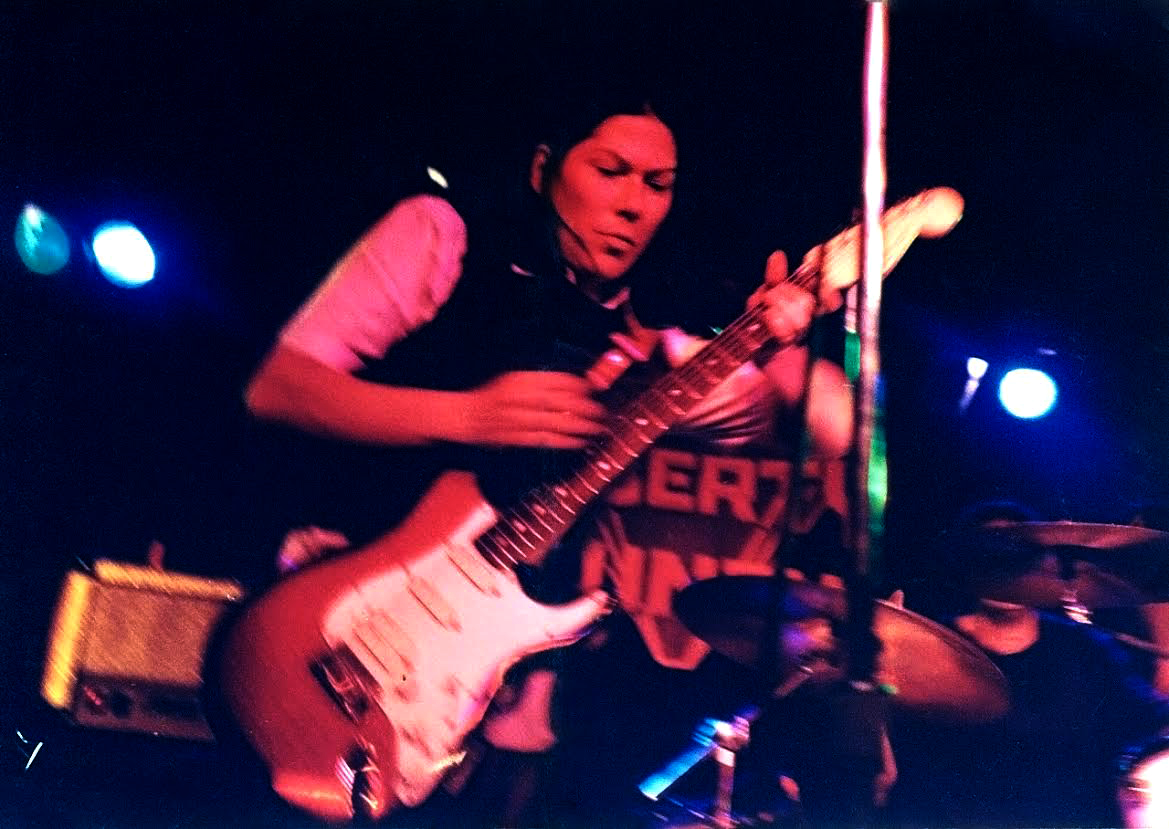
Deal in concert with the Amps in 1995

Deal formed the Amps in 1995 under the sobriquet "Tammy Ampersand". Their lone album, Pacer (1995), was generally well-received but sold poorly.

She also produced music for other groups, most notably fellow Dayton band Guided by Voices (one of the songs on Pacer, "I Am Decided", was co-written by the band's lead singer, Robert Pollard).

Deal has contributed her voice to numerous projects, including This Mortal Coil's 1991 version of Chris Bell's "You and Your Sister" (a duet with Tanya Donnelly); the 1995 Sonic Youth single "Little Trouble Girl"; and the For Carnation's "Tales (Live from the Crypt)" in 2000.

=== Pixies reunion and beyond ===
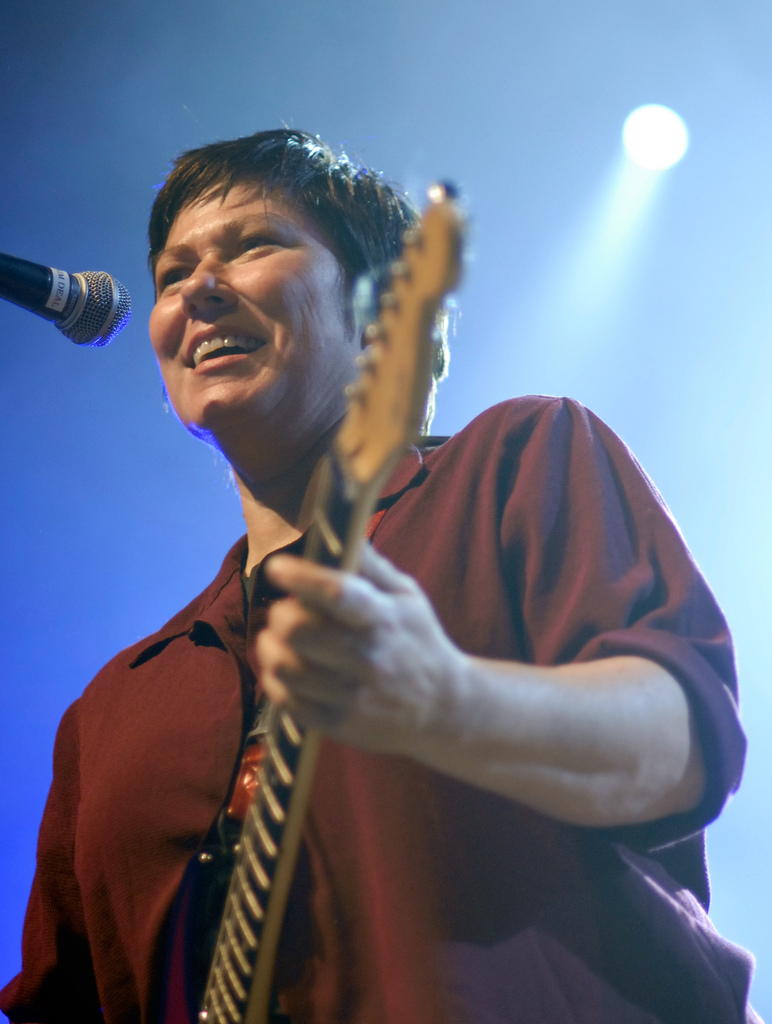
Deal performing in 2009

In 2004, Deal returned to the newly reunited Pixies, releasing the single "Bam Thwok" and touring North America. One notable performance included a live taping for the public television program Austin City Limits in October 2004. The Pixies also played the Coachella Festival in 2004 and headlined Lollapalooza in 2005 at Chicago's Grant Park. The Pixies also toured the UK to critical acclaim, including a headline appearance at the Reading and Leeds Festivals.

In 2003, Deal moved back to Dayton to care for her mother, who had been diagnosed with Alzheimer's disease. In early April 2008, the Breeders released their fourth full-length studio album, Mountain Battles, followed by the EP Fate to Fatal a year later. On June 14, 2013, it was announced that Deal had left the Pixies. She has since posted new solo music on her website. As of 2023, she has no contact with her former Pixies bandmates, according to Joey Santiago.

=== Solo releases, LSXX, and All Nerve ===
In December 2012, Deal played a solo set at the All Tomorrow's Parties "Nightmare Before Christmas" festival in the UK, debuting several new songs. At the same time, she released her first solo single, "Walking with a Killer", and continued to issue further solo releases throughout 2013 and 2014.

In April 2013, 4AD released LSXX, a 20th anniversary edition of the Breeders album Last Splash. Deal reunited with Kelley Deal, Josephine Wiggs, and Jim Macpherson for a Last Splash anniversary tour of North America, Europe, Australia and South America (Brazil and Chile). In August 2014, it was reported that the same lineup was working on new material.

A new single, "Wait in the Car", was released on October 3, 2017. On March 2, 2018, the reunited lineup released All Nerve, their first studio album in ten years, to widespread critical acclaim. In the following months, the Breeders also collaborated on multiple tracks of Courtney Barnett's May 2018 album Tell Me How You Really Feel, with Kim and Kelley singing backing vocals on the singles "Nameless, Faceless" and "Crippling Self-Doubt and a General Lack of Confidence".

In August 2024, Deal announced the pending November 22 release of her debut solo album, Nobody Loves You More, noting it contains several collaborations. Mojo and Uncut listed the album in their year-end rankings of the best albums of 2024, respectively placing it at number six and number forty-two.

== Discography ==
=== Pixies ===
- Come on Pilgrim (1987)
- Surfer Rosa (1988)
- Doolittle (1989)
- Bossanova (1990)
- Trompe le Monde (1991)

=== The Breeders ===
- Pod (1990)
- Safari (EP, 1992)
- Last Splash (1993)
- Live in Stockholm 1994 (1994)
- Head to Toe (EP, 1994)
- Title TK (2002)
- Mountain Battles (2008)
- Fate to Fatal (EP, 2009)
- All Nerve (2018)

=== The Amps ===
- Pacer (1995)

=== Solo ===
- Nobody Loves You More (2024)

=== Solo singles ===
- "Walking with a Killer" b/w "Dirty Hessians" (2012)
- "Hot Shot" b/w "Likkle More" (2013)
- "Are You Mine?" b/w "Wish I Was" (2013)
- "The Root" b/w "Range On Castle" (2014)
- "Biker Gone" b/w "Beautiful Moon" (2014)
- "Coast" (2024)
- "Crystal Breath" (2024)

== Equipment ==
=== Bass guitars ===
Kim Deal generally plays four-string solid-body bass guitars and always uses a pick, particularly the "green Dunlops with the little turtle on them", although since the Pixies' reunion she has also been using custom green Dunlops with "KIM" written on them. She prefers having old strings on a bass.

- Aria Pro II Cardinal Series – the Pixies' first bass belonged to Kelley and was loaned to Kim upon her joining the band. It was used on Come on Pilgrim and Surfer Rosa and seen in the "Town & Country" live video.
- 1962 Fender Precision Reissue – Acquired for use on Doolittle on producer Gil Norton's insistence. It appears in the video for "Here Comes Your Man". On Bossanova, the Precision was used on "Dig for Fire" for its "lazier, growlier sound" that was "not as boingy-boingy-sproingy."
- Music Man StingRay – Acquired during the Bossanova sessions "because it was active and had a different sound," and became her main live bass "because it was a little less country-sounding than the Fender." The instrument was afterwards played by Josephine Wiggs in the Breeders, and by Luis Lerma in the Amps.
- Steinberger headless bass – Bought during the recording of Trompe le Monde due to intonation issues on her other instruments. Deal described it as having a "weird, organ-y sound."
- Gibson Thunderbird – More recently her favorite bass, although she did not use it during the Pixies' reunion, feeling she had to "sound like the records." It is seen played upside-down (left-handed) by Mando Lopez in the Breeders, and by Kim Deal herself in the video for "Biker Gone" (2014).

=== Guitars ===
Deal has noted that she prefers to amplify acoustic guitars through Marshall electric guitar amplifiers.

- Seagull acoustic
- 1958 Gibson Les Paul Goldtop Reissue – Also played by Joey Santiago up through Surfer Rosa (before he acquired his own) and then by Kelley Deal in the Breeders.
- 1991 Fender Stratocaster Ultra – Kelley Deal also has the same model, which she received as a Christmas present from Kim in 1991.
- Fender Telecaster – Occasionally played in the Breeders' live performances since at least the Last Splash era. She was also shown using the guitar on the tour bus in the Pixies documentary film loudQUIETloud (2006).
- Gibson hollowbody – Borrowed for use on Last Splash.

=== Amplification ===
- Peavey 300 Combo, 1×15" speaker
- Trace Elliot bass head – "It's the new series and I don't know what the number is or if there even is a number on there."
- Trace Elliot 1048H bass cabinet, 4×10" speakers
- SWR heads
- Marshall JCM 900 head
- Marshall cabinets
- Gallien-Krueger cabinet, 4×10" speakers
- "Joe's Light" cabinet, 1×18" speaker – Of this and the Gallien-Krueger she commented: "I hate my cabinets."
- Sears Tremolo amp with the word "Marshall" pasted on it.

=== Effects ===
- dbx 160X Compressor – "I use a compressor live, but only because sound guys seem to like it when I have one onstage, even if it's on bypass."
- Boss DS-1 Distortion pedals – Used by both Kim and Kelley.

== Recording ==
Kim Deal eschews digital equipment entirely for recording and mixing. Deal commissioned the "All Wave" logo in an effort to identify recordings that follow this method of recording, and possibly start a movement.

== Personal life ==
Deal married John Murphy on Memorial Day in 1985. Murphy co-wrote the Breeders song "Hoverin'" with Deal. The couple divorced in 1988.

When asked if she had a "gay bone" in her body, Deal responded, "You know what? I'm just so... asexual, I wish I had a gay bone."

Deal is an atheist.
