= Mountain Battles =

Studio album by the Breeders
- Released: April 7, 2008
- Recorded: Electrical Audio, Chicago; Stagg Street, Van Nuys; Manny's, Los Angeles; Refraze, Dayton; as well as basement recordings
- Genre: Art punk
- Length: 36:42
- Label: 4AD

The Breeders chronology
Title TK (2002)	Mountain Battles (2008)	Fate to Fatal (EP) (2009)

Professional ratings
Aggregate scores
Source	Rating
Metacritic	75/100
Review scores
Source	Rating
AllMusic	4/5 stars
Blender	3/5 stars
Entertainment Weekly	C
Mojo	4/5 stars
NME	8/10
Pitchfork	7.5/10
Q	3/5 stars
Rolling Stone	3.5/5 stars
Spin	4/5 stars
Under the Radar	5/10

Mountain Battles is the fourth studio album by American band the Breeders. It was released in the United Kingdom on April 7, 2008, and in the United States on April 8, 2008. The album was gradually recorded in a number of different locales including Refraze Recording Studios in Dayton, Ohio, by engineers including Steve Albini, Erika Larson, Manny Nieto and Ben Mumphrey.

== Song development and recording ==
The Breeders released their previous album, Title TK, in 2002. The group's line-up then consisted of Kim Deal, her twin sister Kelley Deal, Richard Presley, Mando Lopez, and Jose Medeles; at the time, the group was based in Los Angeles. That year, the Deals began demoing songs for the band's next album, including "Regalame Esta Noche" and "No Way". Meanwhile, the group went on tour in the United States and Europe. The Deal sisters continued demoing songs the following year. In 2004, Kim Deal's previous band, Pixies, embarked on a reunion tour, and Kelley also traveled with the group. While on the tour, the sisters worked on "Walk It Off"—footage of them going through the song is included on the Pixies' loudQuietloud DVD. Around this time, Kim and Kelley moved from Los Angeles back to their hometown of Dayton, Ohio, and continued working on new compositions there, including "Bang On" and "Night of Joy", which came about in the spring of 2007. When developing the songs for Mountain Battles, both sisters collaborated on the arrangements. Only Kim, who wrote the lyrics, received songwriting credits, although Kelley was accorded some royalties.

During the period of 2002 to 2007—concurrently with the Deals' writing and demoing—the Breeders attended sessions with a number of engineers to record the album. These comprised sessions at Electrical Audio in Chicago with Steve Albini, and recording in Los Angeles and Refraze Recording Studios in Dayton Ohio with engineers including Erika Larsen, Manny Nieto, and Ben Mumphrey. By this time, Presley had left the group to sell luxury cars, so the Breeders consisted of the Deal twins, Lopez, and Medeles.

== Composition ==
Mountain Battles takes on "primitive" art punk amidst a "raw, sparse" lo-fi sound.

== Track listing ==
All tracks are written by Kim Deal, except where noted.

No.	Title	Writer(s)	Length
1.	"Overglazed"		2:15
2.	"Bang On"		2:03
3.	"Night of Joy"		3:26
4.	"We're Gonna Rise"		3:53
5.	"German Studies"		2:16
6.	"Spark"		2:39
7.	"Istanbul"		2:58
8.	"Walk It Off"		2:46
9.	"Regalame Esta Noche"	Roberto Cantoral	2:52
10.	"Here No More"		2:39
11.	"No Way"		2:33
12.	"It's the Love"	The Tasties	2:28
13.	"Mountain Battles"		3:54

The Japanese release contains the following bonus track:

No.	Title	Length
14.	"German Demonstration"	1:36

== Personnel ==
The Mountain Battles liner notes list the following personnel who helped make the album; the liner notes do not mention which instruments the Deal sisters, Lopez, and Medeles played.

=== Musicians ===
- Kim Deal
- Kelley Deal
- Mando Lopez
- Jose Medeles
- Steven Medina Hüfsteter – guitar on "Regalame Esta Noche"
- Heather Winna – marching cymbals on "Walk It Off"
- Todd Mund – background vocals on "German Studies"

=== Engineering and mastering ===
- Steve Albini – engineering
- Erika Larsen – engineering
- Manny Nieto – engineering, mastering
- Ben Mumphrey – engineering
- Steve Rook – mastering

=== Art design ===
- Vaughan Oliver – art design
- Marc Atkins – photography

== Charts ==
Chart (2008)	Position
Belgian Album Chart	63
French Album Chart	100
UK Album Chart	46
US Billboard 200	98
US Independent Albums	12
