= Fate to Fatal =

EP by the Breeders
- Released: April 21, 2009
- Genre: Alternative rock
- Length: 14:48
- Label: Period Music (U.S.)
- Producers: Ben Mumphrey, Steve Albini, Gareth Parton

The Breeders chronology
Mountain Battles (2008)	Fate to Fatal (2009)	All Nerve (2018)

Fate to Fatal is an EP by the American alternative rock band the Breeders, released on Period Music, on April 21, 2009. It was recorded in three locations by multiple engineers: the title track was recorded at the Fortress Studios, London with producer Gareth Parton; "The Last Time", which features lead vocals by Mark Lanegan, and "Pinnacle Hollow" were recorded by Ben Mumphrey in Dayton, Ohio; "Chances Are", a cover of a Bob Marley song, was recorded by Steve Albini at Electrical Audio in Chicago.

== Development and recording ==
The Breeders released their fourth studio album, Mountain Battles, in the spring of 2008, and the Deals continued writing new songs. Near the end of their 2008 tour, they were in the United Kingdom, and decided to record the new composition "Fate to Fatal" at Fortress Studios in London. The song took about two days to record and mix, including time spent moving their musical equipment into the studio and setting up. The engineer was Gareth Parton, with assistants Tom Morris and Nick Trepka.

Later, the Breeders found out that they would be curating the All Tomorrow's Parties music festival—held on May 15, 2009 in Minehead, United Kingdom. They had been playing their Mountain Battles material for several months, and decided that it would be nice to have new songs to perform. Their first thought was to put out one or two songs on a single, but subsequently decided to release an EP instead. They had three original compositions that they wanted to release, but felt that this would be too short for an EP, so they decided to also do a cover of Bob Marley's "Chances Are". They recorded this at Electrical Audio in Chicago, with engineer Steve Albini and assistants Dominique D'Amico and Gregoire Yeche.

The Breeders recorded "Pinnacle Hollow" and "The Last Time" in Kim Deal's basement, at her home in Dayton, Ohio, with engineer Ben Mumphrey. Kim and Kelley recorded the latter track in January 2009; Breeders Mondo Lopez and Jose Medeles were not present. They then sent the track to Mark Lanegan, who recorded his vocals elsewhere, and sent it back to them. The assistant engineer for "Pinnacle Hollow" was James Hutchinson.

== Songs ==
Reviewers have characterized "Fate to Fatal" as "ramshackle", "jarring and ... exuberant". The music and singing alternates between loud and quiet, reminiscent of the dynamic that Kim's former group, Pixies, is known for. Kim notes that the song's title refers to the line "What men pray for, what men cradle/I've gone from fate to fatal"; she describes the song as about a lonesome person who does not know how to connect with other people.

Kim Deal has stated that "The Last Time" is about "moments where ... [one feels] gutted, taken down in life". When she wrote the song, she imagined it being sung by a man. She recorded a version with her singing it herself, but felt that she did not convey enough pain in her performance. While discussing Mark Lanegan's work with a friend, she decided to ask him to sing on the track, and he agreed. Lanegan's vocals have been compared to Lou Reed's, and described as "weary" and as a "pallbearer growl".

Kim and Kelley Deal had been listening to, and considering recording a cover of, "Chances Are" for about ten years. They had experimented with adding instruments such as drums and stand-up bass, but their version on Fate to Fatal is a more minimalist, acoustic rendition. In interviews, the Deals have noted that while Bob Marley is associated with reggae, "Chances Are" comes from his earlier, doo-wop period.

"Pinnacle Hollow", in which Kim hears a Neil Young influence, has been described as having a "bluesy" and a "slightly spooky" sound. There are approximately two and a half minutes of instrumentation before the vocals start. Kim and Kelley sing—in a manner that has been characterized as "deadpan"—lines such as "I don't know a sin I haven't found" and "up and down the road...." Kim was originally going to call the composition "Up and Down" but later decided on "Pinnacle Hollow", named after Pinnacle Holler, a place where the Deals' mother grew up in West Virginia.

== Cover ==
The EP's cover was designed by Chris Glass. Not long before this, Glass had designed the logo for U.S. president Barack Obama's American Recovery and Reinvestment Act of 2009. The Fate to Fatal design was Glass's first work doing a record cover. Glass, who is related to the Deals through marriage, had been a fan of the Breeders' music and of the work of Vaughan Oliver, who had designed most of the group's covers for 4AD.

== Release and reception ==
Professional ratings
Review scores
Source	Rating
Consequence Of Sound	B
Pitchfork	6.4/10
Under the Radar	8/10 stars

All of the Breeders' previous albums and EPs had been released on the record label 4AD: up until 2002's Title TK Kim Deal was under contract with that label, and the Breeders released 2008's Mountain Battles with 4AD as a "one-off". For Fate to Fatal, they considered whether it was worthwhile to negotiate again with 4AD to release it as well. They conferred with friends in the music industry, including Albini, Bob Weston, and former 4AD owner Ivo Watts-Russell, and decided to release the EP themselves independently, on Period Music. On April 21, 2009, they released 1000 copies on vinyl for Record Store Day; they also made the EP available digitally.

== Video ==
The Breeders made a music video for the song "Fate to Fatal", co-directed by Lopez and James Ford. They shot the video at the St. Louis Skatium, a roller rink in St. Louis, where they filmed the Arch Rival Rollergirls women's roller derby team. The idea for this setting came when by chance Kelley met groups of roller derby athletes in the summer and autumn of 2008: first, an Arch Rival member named Amy Whited that the Deals had known since her childhood; next, a roller derby team at a Barack Obama benefit in Cincinnati; then, a different team at a craft competition in Minnesota. The "Fate to Fatal" video also includes footage of the Breeders in studio.

== Track listing ==
All tracks are written by Kim Deal, except where noted.

No.	Title	Writer(s)	Length
1.	"Fate to Fatal"		2:44
2.	"The Last Time"		3:11
3.	"Chances Are"	Bob Marley	3:24
4.	"Pinnacle Hollow"		5:27

== Personnel ==
- Kim Deal – guitar, vocals
- Kelley Deal – guitar, vocals
- Mando Lopez – bass
- Jose Medeles – drums
- Mark Lanegan – lead vocals on "The Last Time"
