= Carrie Bradley =

American violinist and vocalist

Carrie Bradley is an American violinist and vocalist. After graduating from Williams College in 1984, she was a founding member of the alternative folk band Ed's Redeeming Qualities, and has played in The Breeders, a pop and rock band of 11 members, and 100 Watt Smile. Since 2003, Bradley has appeared as half of the San Francisco–based musical duo The Great Auk.
