= The Breeders =

American alternative rock band

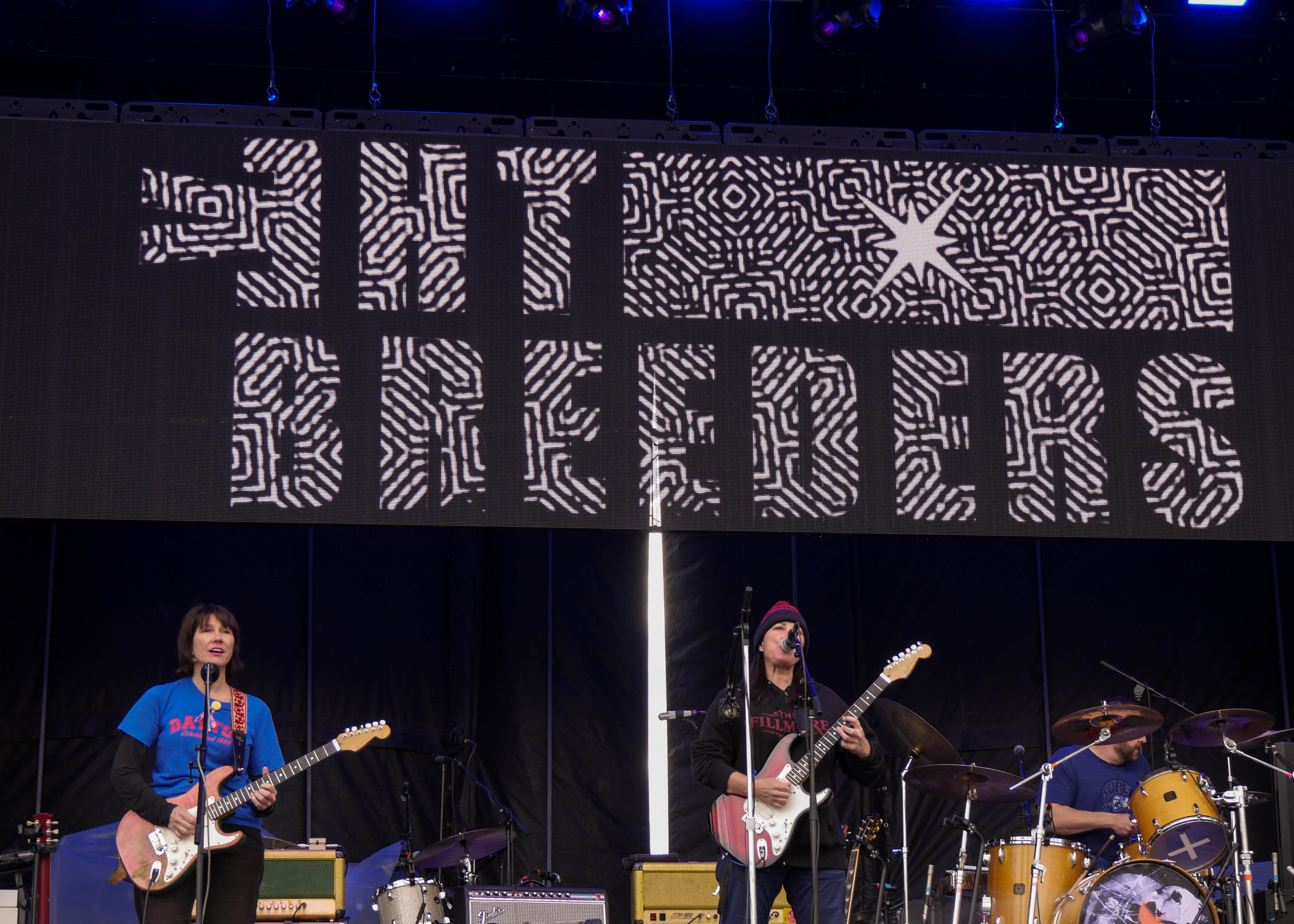
- The Breeders performing in 2018

Background information
- Origin: Dayton, Ohio, U.S.
- Genres: Alternative rock
- Works: Discography
- Years active: 1989–1995; 1996–2003; 2008–present
- Labels: 4AD; Elektra
- Spinoffs: The Amps; Belly; Dusty Trails; Honey Tongue; The Last Hard Men; The Kelley Deal 6000
- Spinoff of: The Perfect Disaster; Pixies; Slint; Throwing Muses
- Members: Kim Deal; Kelley Deal; Josephine Wiggs; Jim Macpherson
- Past members: Tanya Donelly; Britt Walford; Carrie Bradley; Richard Presley; José Medeles; Mando Lopez
- Website: www.thebreedersmusic.com

The Breeders are an American alternative rock band based in Dayton, Ohio, consisting of members Kim Deal (rhythm guitar, lead vocals), her twin sister Kelley Deal (lead guitar, vocals), Josephine Wiggs (bass guitar, vocals), and Jim Macpherson (drums).

The earliest incarnation of the band was formed by Kim Deal and Tanya Donelly in 1989 as a side-project alongside their full-time bands Pixies and Throwing Muses respectively. To record their debut album, 1990's Pod, Deal and Donelly recruited bassist Josephine Wiggs of the Perfect Disaster and drummer Britt Walford of Slint. Kim's sister Kelley was brought into the band as a third guitarist (though at the time, Kelley had never played guitar before) in 1992 to record the Safari EP, and shortly thereafter Tanya Donelly left to concentrate full-time on her own new band, Belly, leaving Kelley Deal as the sole lead guitarist; Britt Walford left as well around the same time. While the band's first record was not initially a commercial success, the band had developed a following among indie rock fans and praise from people such as Nirvana frontman Kurt Cobain, who cited Pod as one of his all-time favorite albums. Meanwhile, the band prepared to record their next album.

In 1993, the Pixies broke up, leaving Deal to concentrate on The Breeders as her full-time band. Kim recruited local Dayton musician Jim Macpherson (previously a member of indie rock band the Raging Mantras) to replace the recently departed Walford on drums, cementing the Breeders' best-known line-up. The band's most commercially successful album, Last Splash, was released in 1993 during the early 1990s alternative rock boom. The album went on to be certified platinum by the RIAA, and is best known for its hit single "Cannonball".

A year after the success of Last Splash, drug and alcohol issues forced the band into hiatus in 1994, while both the Deal sisters did separate stints in rehab in the following years. During the band's hiatus, Kim Deal formed the short-lived alternative rock band The Amps, recording a single album, Pacer, in 1995. In the late 1990s, Kim and Kelley reformed The Breeders with a new line-up (including members of the band Fear) and released two more albums, Title TK in 2002 and Mountain Battles in 2008. In 2013, Kim and Kelley had announced that the "classic" line-up (including Josephine Wiggs and Jim Macpherson) had reunited for the first time since the 1990s for a new series of tours celebrating the 20th anniversary of the band's hit album Last Splash. They released their fifth album All Nerve in 2018, the first "classic" Breeders line-up's full-length album together since 1993's Last Splash.

== History ==
=== Formation ===
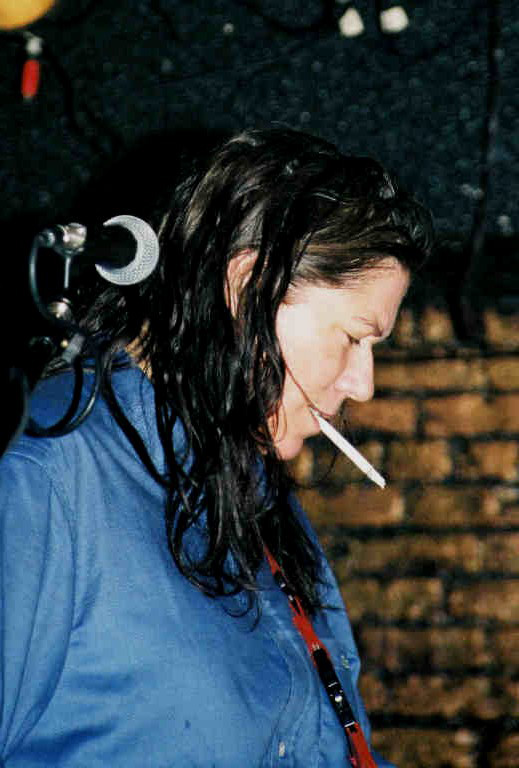
Lead singer Kim Deal performing with the band, c. 2002

Kim Deal, not fulfilled in her role as bassist of the Pixies, began writing new material while the Pixies were touring Surfer Rosa in Europe with Throwing Muses. As neither band had plans in the immediate future, Deal discussed possible side projects with Throwing Muses guitarist Tanya Donelly. They recruited Carrie Bradley, violinist and vocalist in Boston band Ed's Redeeming Qualities, and recorded a short demo tape. Tracks on the demo tape included early versions of "Lime House", "Doe", and "Only in 3's".

With the help of three different drummers—David Narcizo, Mickey Bones, and Carl Haarer—and bassist Ray Halliday, Deal and Donelly completed their demo tape and subsequently played one show at The Rathskeller in Boston. They were not called The Breeders at this point, but were billed as "Boston Girl Super-Group". The band sent the tape to the English independent record label 4AD because both the Pixies and the Throwing Muses were signed to the label. Upon hearing the tape, 4AD head Ivo Watts-Russell remarked, "This is absolutely magical, beautiful stuff." Deal originally described the band as "the Bangles from Hell".

The name Breeders had previously been used for a band Deal led with her twin sister Kelley. "Breeders", a gay derogatory slang term for heterosexuals, was chosen because Kim Deal found it humorous and also reflected her love of horror films, specifically referencing David Cronenberg's 1979 film The Brood.

=== Pod (1990–1991) ===
"Iris"
Sample of "Iris," the eighth track on their first album Pod.

4AD gave Deal and Donelly a budget of $11,000 to make an album. Deal asked the Perfect Disaster's Josephine Wiggs to play bass. The two had first met when Perfect Disaster supported the Pixies in London in 1988. Deal asked Steve Albini, who had worked on the Pixies' 1988 album Surfer Rosa, to record the album. The Breeders did not have a drummer, so Albini suggested Britt Walford of Slint. Walford agreed to play on the album under the pseudonym "Shannon Doughton".

A week of rehearsal took place at Wiggs's house in Bedfordshire, England, and Pod was recorded in ten days in Edinburgh, Scotland. They used the remaining time to record a Peel Session and a video for "Hellbound." Returning to London, they played two shows, the only time that this lineup ever appeared onstage together. Released on 28 May 1990, Pod, although not commercially successful, received positive reviews from alternative and mainstream critics alike; The New York Times' Karen Schoemer wrote: "The angular melodies, shattered tempos, and screeching dynamics recall elements of each of the women's full-time bands, but Pod has a smart, innovative edge all its own."

Pod was cited by Kurt Cobain as one of his favorite records ever: "The main reason I like [the Breeders] is for their songs, for the way they structure them, which is totally unique, very atmospheric. I wish Kim was allowed to write more songs for the Pixies, because 'Gigantic' is the best Pixies song, and Kim wrote it." He listed Pod as one of the 50 albums he thought were most influential to Nirvana's sound in his journal in 1993. In July 2007, Albini said he considered the album among his best works.

=== Safari and Last Splash (1992–1994) ===
Following Pod, the members of The Breeders returned to their original bands. The Pixies released Bossanova in 1990 and Trompe le Monde in 1991, but by the end of 1991 were becoming less active. Deal, with time off from the Pixies, visited Wiggs in Brighton, and they went into a London studio with Spacemen 3/Spiritualized drummer Jon Mattock to record a new song called "Safari." The other three tracks on what became the Safari EP were recorded in New York with Walford and Donelly, who was by then planning to form Belly. Deal then asked her sister Kelley to take over on guitar, even though Kelley did not know how to play guitar. The Pixies became inactive in mid-1992, at which time drummer Jim Macpherson was recruited and The Breeders became a full-time band, opening for Nirvana on their 1992 European tour.

In January 1993, The Breeders went to Coast Recorders in San Francisco to record their second album. Last Splash was released in August 1993 to widespread acclaim and commercial success. Three singles were released from the album, including "Cannonball", which made it to no. 2 on the Billboard Modern Rock Tracks chart. The band contributed a live recording of the song "Iris" to the 1993 AIDS-Benefit Album No Alternative produced by the Red Hot Organization. In 1993, they toured supporting Nirvana on their In Utero tour, and in 1994, Last Splash received a platinum certification by the Recording Industry Association of America. Also in 1994, the band secured a prime spot on the Lollapalooza tour. This lineup played their last show together on September 5, 1994, at Lollapalooza in Los Angeles, California until reuniting in 2012.

=== Hiatus ===
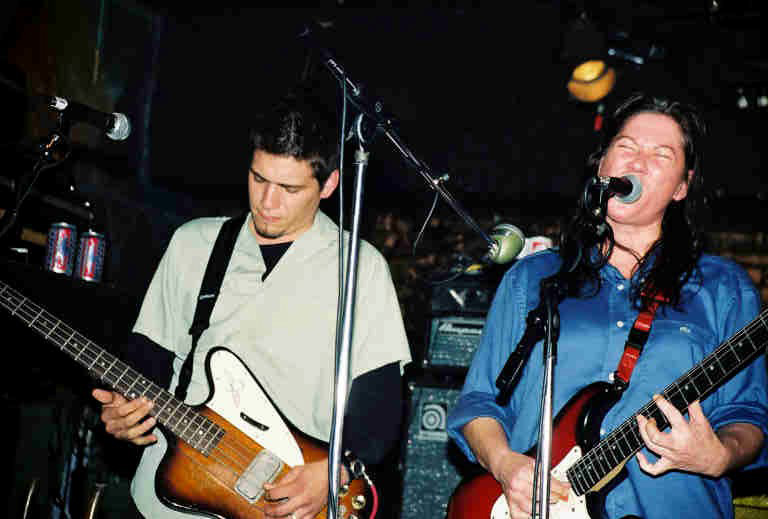
Title TK line-up (pictured: Kim Deal and Mando Lopez) performing in concert

In 1995, Kelley was involved in a drug bust, which put The Breeders on an indefinite hiatus. Kim formed a side project, The Amps, with Macpherson, Dayton locals bassist Luis Lerma (member of The Tasties) and guitarist Nate Farley, who later joined Guided by Voices. In October 1995, The Amps released the album Pacer.

Following drug rehab, Kelley started The Kelley Deal 6000, also forming The Last Hard Men with Skid Row singer Sebastian Bach, Smashing Pumpkins drummer Jimmy Chamberlin, and Jimmy Flemion of The Frogs.

Meanwhile, in New York, Wiggs recorded and co-produced the Kostars' album Klassics with a K, a Luscious Jackson side-project (also touring with them playing drums), released a solo album on the Beastie Boys' Grand Royal label, and released an album on Atlantic Records under the name Dusty Trails with Luscious Jackson keyboardist Vivian Trimble.

In 1996, Kim reclaimed The Breeders moniker, but with essentially The Amps' lineup plus violinist Carrie Bradley, and played a few California dates. They made an unsuccessful attempt at recording a third studio album in 1997. Kelley Deal rejoined the band the following year and wrote and recorded songs with her sister, although the only material released during this period was a cover of The Three Degrees' take on James Gang's "Collage", recorded for The Mod Squad soundtrack in 1999.

=== Title TK (2001–2002) ===
The Deal sisters recruited new personnel to play several live shows in 2001, and returned to the studio with guitarist Richard Presley, bass player Mando Lopez, and drummer Jose Medeles to record the third Breeders studio album, Title TK, with Steve Albini. This lineup was profiled in a short documentary film entitled The Breeders: The Real Deal (Netherlands, 2002).

The Breeders also performed in an episode of Buffy the Vampire Slayer in early 2002. They were approached by the production staff after they had been playing the show's theme, written by Nerf Herder, as a regular part of their concert set. The episode is entitled "Him", and aired November 5, 2002; they sang their song "Little Fury" at the Bronze. They also contributed the track "Wicked Little Town: Hedwig Version" to the 2003 Hedwig and the Angry Inch tribute album, "Wig in a Box".

=== Mountain Battles and Fate to Fatal (2008–2010) ===
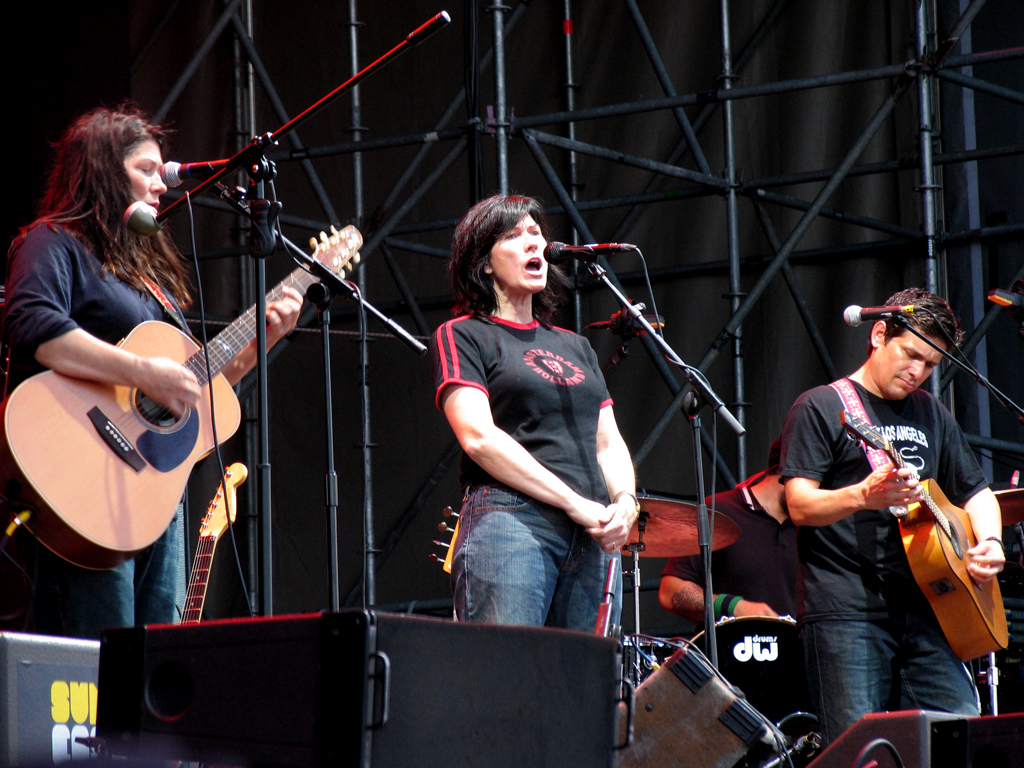
The Breeders performing in 2008

Mountain Battles was released in April 2008 on 4AD. It features Kim and Kelley, Jose Medeles, and Mando Lopez. They went to Refraze Recording Studio in Dayton, Ohio to record and mix the majority of the tracks.

The Breeders' third EP, Fate to Fatal was released on April 21, 2009. It contains a Bob Marley cover ("Chances Are") and a song with vocals by Mark Lanegan ("The Last Time"). The title track was recorded at The Fortress Studios, London, by The Go! Team producer Gareth Parton. The music video featured the Arch Rival Roller Girls, a St. Louis roller derby league.

They curated an edition of the All Tomorrow's Parties festival in May 2009 in Minehead, England. They played the ATP New York 2010 music festival in Monticello, New York, in September 2010.

=== LSXX and All Nerve (2012–present) ===
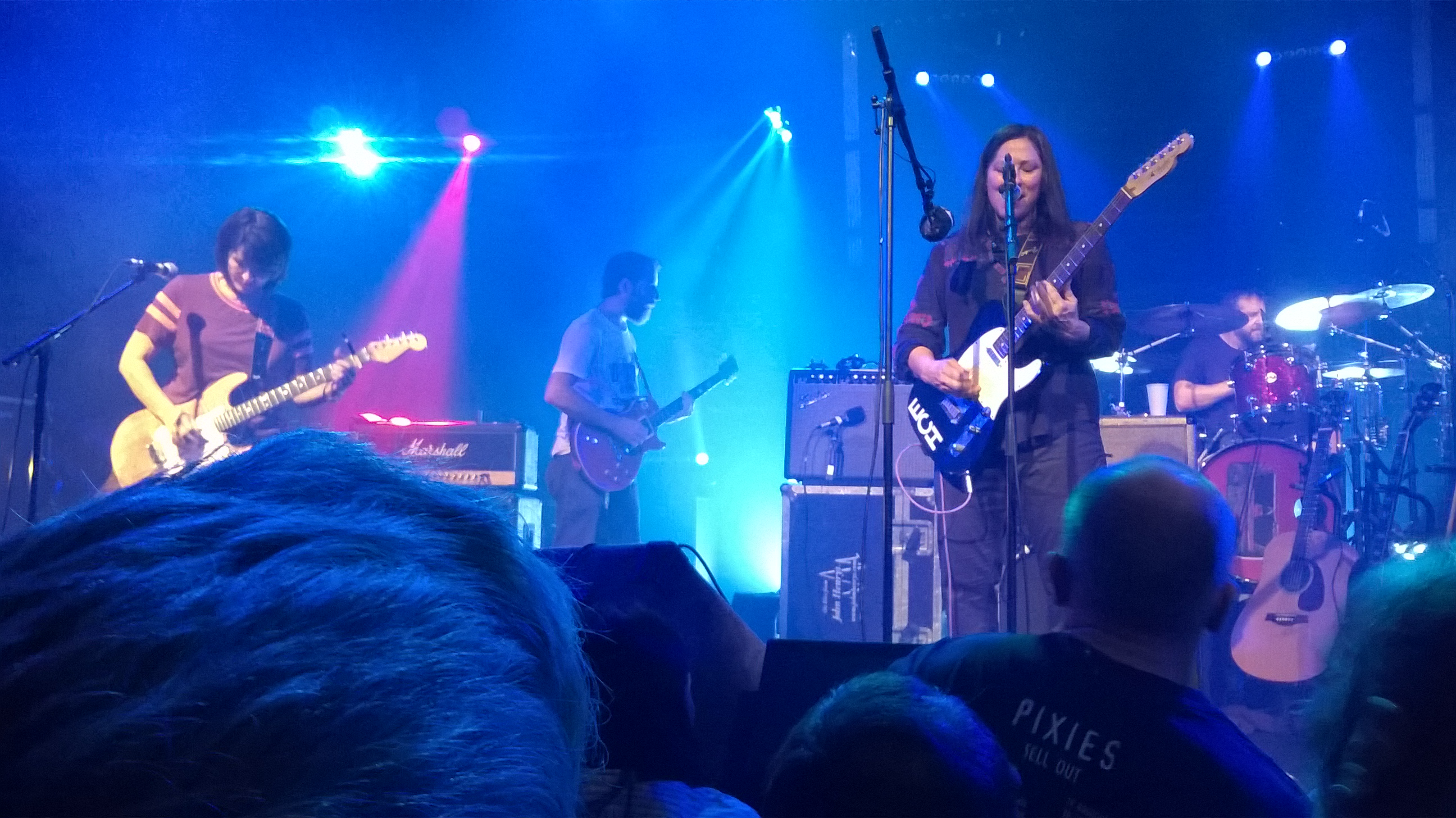
The Breeders performing in Paris, France in 2017.

In 2012, the reunited Last Splash lineup of Kim and Kelley, Macpherson, and Wiggs announced a tour to coincide with a 20th anniversary reissue by 4AD of Last Splash, entitled LSXX. The tour began in the US, continued in Europe, Australia, and South America, and included the Deerhunter-curated All Tomorrow's Parties festival. A teaser video was made by the band showing the reunited lineup in rehearsal.

In a June 2016 article, Stereogum reported that the band was in their Ohio studio recording a follow-up to Mountain Battles, and that Courtney Barnett, who was in town for the Nelsonville Music Festival, recorded some backup vocals for one of the album's songs.

A single, "Wait in the Car", was released on October 3, 2017: as well as the digital release, it came out as three different seven-inch records limited to only 1,500 copies. Rolling Stone described the song as "a classic Breeders bruiser, clocking it at two minutes, and packed with punchy drums, sugar-rush power chords, and lead riffs". During a BBC interview with Lauren Laverne on October 13, 2017, Kim revealed that the band expected to release a new album in 2018, possibly on the 4AD label. 4AD announced on January 9, 2018, that the new album, All Nerve, would be released on March 2, 2018. The title track was released as the album's second single on the same day. All Nerve, was released as planned on March 2, 2018.

In March 2021, the band released their first new recording in over three years: A cover of His Name is Alive's "The Dirt Eaters." The cover is part of a forthcoming 4AD covers compilation, entitled Bills and Aches and Blues.

The band performed at the 22nd Coachella Valley Music and Arts Festival in April 2023. They went on to undertake a US tour to mark the 30th anniversary of Last Splash with Belly in support on some dates, during which Tanya Donelly joined the Breeders onstage for the encore. Early in 2024 they supported the Foo Fighters on their tour of New Zealand.

On September 13, 2023, Olivia Rodrigo announced her Guts World Tour for February through August 2024. The Breeders opened for her at Madison Square Garden on April 5−6 and 8–9, and again at the Kia Forum in Inglewood, California, on August 13–14 and 16–17. Their MSG set on April 8 was praised by Billboard's Andrew Unterberger, who wrote that seeing the band "get the chance to become arena-rockers that should have long been theirs by right of their inspired '90s work – which has also since extended to excellent albums in the '00s and '10s – was a very powerful thing", and said that Rodrigo including them "goes beyond a new artist paying her respects to those who came before her, I think, and serves to help connect and re-strengthen a timeline that was at serious risk of being totally severed." When asked about the MSG shows in an interview, Kim Deal said it was odd at first, but after learning Rodrigo knew St. Vincent and is a fan of Billy Joel and Sheryl Crow, she said "[Rodrigo]'s just really into music. Knowing that, it made more sense. She just really liked us!"

== Band members ==
Current members

- Kim Deal – lead vocals, rhythm guitar (1989–1995, 1996–2003, 2008–present), lead guitar (1996–1998)
- Josephine Wiggs – bass, backing and occasional lead vocals (1989–1995, 2012–present)
- Kelley Deal – lead guitar, backing vocals (1992–1995, 1998–2003, 2008–present), rhythm guitar (1992)
- Jim Macpherson – drums, percussion (1992–1995, 1996–1997, 2012–present)

Current touring musicians

- Sophie Galpin – violin, guitar, keyboards (2018–present)

Former members

- Tanya Donelly – lead guitar, backing and occasional lead vocals (1989–1992)
- Carrie Bradley – violin (1989–1993, 1996–1997)
- Britt Walford – drums, backing vocals (1989–1992)
- Jon Mattock – drums (1992)
- Richard Presley – rhythm and lead guitar (2000–2006)
- Mando Lopez – bass (2000–2006, 2008–2012)
- Jose Medeles – drums (2001–2003, 2008–2012)

Former touring musicians

- Nate Farley – guitar (1996–1997)
- Luis Lerma – bass (1996–1997)
- Cheryl Lyndsey – guitar (2008–2012)

== Discography ==
=== Studio albums ===
- Pod (1990)
- Last Splash (1993)
- Title TK (2002)
- Mountain Battles (2008)
- All Nerve (2018)

=== EPs ===
- Safari (1992)
- Head to Toe (1994)
- Fate to Fatal (2009)
