= The Breeders Tour 2014 =

2014 concert tour

- Tour by the Breeders
- Start date: September 2, 2014
- End date: September 20, 2014
- No. of shows: 13

the Breeders concert chronology
- LSXX Tour (2013); Tour 2014; Tour 2017

The American alternative rock band the Breeders played a tour of thirteen concerts in the central and western United States in September 2014. After the group's "classic" lineup reunited in 2013 for a tour commemorating the 20th anniversary of Last Splash, they began working on new material. Ahead of opening for Neutral Milk Hotel at the Hollywood Bowl, they planned a tour leading up to this show, using the opportunity to practice recent compositions that would appear on their 2018 album All Nerve.

Between September 2 and September 17, the Breeders performed in eleven cities, including St. Louis, Denver, Seattle, Portland, San Francisco, and Las Vegas. Support bands the Funs and the Neptunas opened for them at five and six of these shows, respectively. The group finished the tour on September 20 at the Goose Island 312 Urban Block Party event in Chicago. As well as new songs, they performed numerous selections from Last Splash and Pod. The tour received good reviews from critics; appraisal included comments that the performances were rousing, and that the band was as good as—or better than—in their heyday.

== Background ==
In 1993, the Breeders released their second album, Last Splash. At this time, the group's lineup consisted of sisters Kim and Kelley Deal on guitar and vocals, Josephine Wiggs on bass and vocals, and Jim Macpherson on drums. Last Splash was successful in various countries worldwide, (Note: It went platinum in the United States; gold in Australia, Canada, and France; and silver in the United Kingdom.) and the group toured extensively and played at Lollapalooza 1994. In November 1994, Kelley Deal was arrested on drug-related charges, and Wiggs left the band in the mid-1990s and got involved in other musical projects. Macpherson continued playing with Kim Deal in her side-project group, the Amps, and then in the 1996 incarnation of the Breeders, but quit the band in 1997. The Breeders' lineups for their next two albums, Title TK (2002) and Mountain Battles (2008), included the Deal sisters, Mando Lopez, and Jose Medeles, as well as Richard Presley on Title TK. In 2013, Wiggs and Macpherson rejoined the Deals to tour the 20th anniversary of Last Splash—the LSXX Tour. (Note: According to Kelly Deal, both Lopez and Medeles ceded their spots in the group amicably, and were supportive of the Deals' wish to work with Wiggs and Macpherson again.)

On December 31, 2013, the Breeders performed their final concert on the 60-date tour in Austin, Texas. The group enjoyed the LSXX concerts, and decided they would like to record new music together. Throughout 2014, Wiggs traveled from her home in Brooklyn, New York to Dayton, Ohio, near where Macpherson and both Deals lived. The group began practicing new material in Kim Deal's basement, including compositions by her and one by Wiggs. By August, there were three new songs they could play well, two less so, and others they had not yet practiced. Reported titles were "Skinhead #2", "Simone", "All Nerve", and "Launched". The band Neutral Milk Hotel asked the Breeders to open for them at a Hollywood Bowl concert to be held on September 18. The latter decided to go on a tour leading up to this show and to perform some new compositions in preparation for their eventual recording. (Note: By November 2014, the Breeders had recorded two of the compositions—"All Nerve" and "Skinhead #2"—with engineer Steve Albini. Their album of new material All Nerve was released in March 2018, containing these songs but not "Simone" or "Launched".)

== Performances and reception ==
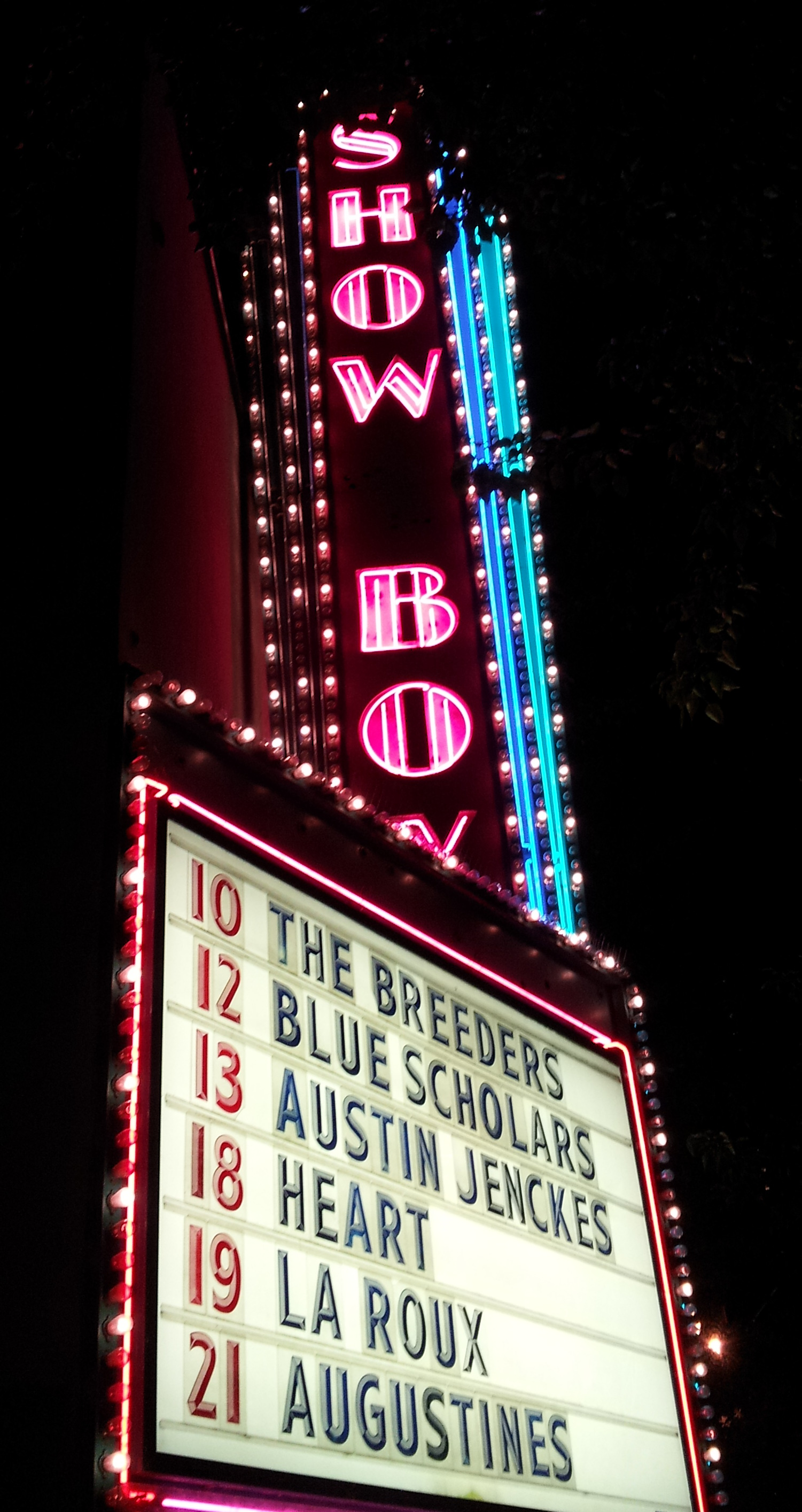
Stops on the Breeders' 2014 tour included the Showbox in Seattle.

The September 2014 tour comprised thirteen American dates, all in western and central states. At various shows—between which the Breeders traveled by van—the Funs, the Neptunas, and Kelley Stoltz were the opening acts. (Note: The Funs were devotees of the Breeders, and became involved in the tour when member Philip Jerome Lesicko sent a video of a Funs' live performance to Kim Deal; she liked it and invited them to be an opening act. Deal was also an admirer of the Neptunas, who had been inactive for several years but reunited when the Breeders asked them to join the 2014 tour.) The tour began in early September with dates in St. Louis and Kansas City, Missouri, and then continued west to Denver, Salt Lake City, and Garden City, Idaho. On September 10, the Breeders started a short Pacific Coast stretch, performing in Seattle, Portland, and San Francisco. (Note: Originally, they had not planned to perform in San Francisco, and were to play at the CS2V Festival in San Jose instead; when it became uncertain whether the musical part of this festival would be held, the Breeders redirected their tour to San Francisco.) These were followed by Las Vegas and Phoenix, then west again to San Diego, leading up to their concert on September 18 at the Hollywood Bowl with Neutral Milk Hotel and Daniel Johnston. Breeder's Digest, their official website, announced Carrie Bradley's reunion with the band for this show. Following the Hollywood concert, the Breeders finished their tour at the Goose Island 312 Urban Block Party event in Chicago on September 20, with groups such as Unknown Mortal Orchestra and Thao & the Get Down Stay Down.

In addition to the new compositions "Simone", "Skinhead #2", "All Nerve", and "Launched", the Breeders performed many songs from their albums Pod (1990) and Last Splash. Among these were "Saints", "Cannonball", "No Aloha", and "Divine Hammer" from Last Splash, as well as "Doe", "Happiness Is a Warm Gun", and "Iris" from Pod. They also played "Off You" from Title TK and the title track from the Safari EP (1992). Another composition they performed was "Walking with a Killer", which had originally been released in 2012—with the B-side "Dirty Hessians"—as the first in a series of solo 7" singles by Kim Deal, and which the Breeders had played in 2013 on their LSXX Tour. (Note: Full set lists of a few of the concerts have been reported. In Kansas City, the Breeders played: "Off You"; "Saints"; "Hag"; "Skinhead #2"; "SOS"; "Limehouse"; "Simone"; "Doe"; "Hellbound"; "Walking with a Killer"; "Fortunately Gone"; "Happiness is a Warm Gun"; "Launched"; "New Year"; "Cannonball"; "All Nerve"; "No Aloha"; "Divine Hammer" and during the encore "Glorious"; "Safari"; "Iris".; At their Las Vegas show, the set list was almost the same, with some variation in the order, and with the inclusion of Last Splash's "I Just Wanna Get Along" and "Do You Love Me Now?" instead of "Launched". During their shorter Hollywood set, they performed this album's "Drivin' on 9", as well as twelve of the songs from the Kansas City and Las Vegas concerts.)

The band's performances on the 2014 tour were generally well received. Regarding their September 3 concert in Kansas City, Danny Phillips of Blurt wrote that the Breeders "like wine, seem to improve with age", adding that nothing about the show could have been better; The Kansas City Star's Timothy Finn likewise summed the night up as "an evening that exceeded its promise". Critic Lissa Townsend Rodgers of the Vegas Seven website commended their rousing performances of "New Year" and "Cannonball" at their Las Vegas concert on September 16—a show also enjoyed by Leslie Ventura of Las Vegas Weekly, who noted the confidence with which the band played. Reviewing the September 17 date in San Diego, critic Alex Packard of Listensd.com opined that the Breeders "deliver[ed] the classics like they wrote them yesterday and new material in no less of a moving way". Both Keith Plocek of LA Weekly and Philip Cosores of Consequence of Sound liked the September 18 concert at the Hollywood Bowl; Cosores rated a few of the performances as impeccable, and commented that Kim Deal's "rock and roll soul is still as strong as ever".

Tim Hinely, also of Blurt, wrote that although the Breeders’ showing in Denver on September 5 could by no means be considered first rate, it was nonetheless enjoyable; in Portland on September 11, 94/7's Yume Delegato heard the group's performance as appealingly unpolished and heartfelt, but asserted that some of the new songs did not leave a strong impression.

== Dates ==
List of concerts, showing date, city, venue, support acts and references
Date	City	Country	Venue or event	Support	Ref.
September 2, 2014	St. Louis	United States	Off Broadway	The Funs	
September 3, 2014	Kansas City	United States	Record Bar	The Funs	
September 5, 2014	Denver	United States	Summit Music Hall	The Funs	
September 7, 2014	Salt Lake City	United States	Urban Lounge	The Funs	
September 8, 2014	Garden City	United States	Visual Arts Collective	The Funs	
September 10, 2014	Seattle	United States	The Showbox	The Neptunas	
September 11, 2014	Portland	United States	Wonder Ballroom	The Neptunas	
September 13, 2014	San Francisco	United States	The Fillmore	Kelley Stoltz; The Neptunas	
September 15, 2014	Las Vegas	United States	Bunkhouse Saloon	The Neptunas	
September 16, 2014	Phoenix	United States	Crescent Ballroom	The Neptunas	
September 17, 2014	San Diego	United States	The Casbah	The Neptunas	
September 18, 2014	Los Angeles	United States	Hollywood Bowl	Neutral Milk Hotel (headliner); Daniel Johnston	
September 20, 2014	Chicago	United States	Goose Island 312 Urban Block Party	Thao & the Get Down Stay Down; Unknown Mortal Orchestra; Cayucas	
