= LSXX Tour =

2013 concert tour by the Breeders

- Tour by the Breeders
- Start date: May 2, 2013
- End date: December 31, 2013
- No. of shows: 60

the Breeders concert chronology
- Tour 2009; LSXX Tour (2013); Tour 2014

The LSXX Tour was a series of sixty concerts by the Breeders in 2013 to commemorate the twentieth anniversary of the release of their 1993 album Last Splash.

== Background ==
In the early 1990s, Kim Deal was a member of both the Breeders and the Pixies; the latter broke up in 1993. When the Breeders released their second album Last Splash that same year—on 4AD Records—the group consisted of Kim and her twin sister Kelley Deal on guitar and vocals, Jim Macpherson on drums, and Josephine Wiggs on bass and vocals. The album sold well, reaching platinum status in the USA, and gold or silver in France, Australia, Canada, and the UK.

Between 1992 and September 1994, the Breeders had an intense schedule including touring and recording, and by autumn 1994 most of the band members were tired. During the Lollapalooza tour in summer 1994, Deal mentioned to those around her that she wanted her next project to be solo, "something quick and dirty, under the radar ... without the pressure of following up [Last Splash's hit single] 'Cannonball'".

That autumn and winter, Deal wrote songs inspired by her life where she lived in Dayton, Ohio, and practiced them in her basement. In November 1994, Kelley Deal was arrested on drug-related charges, and had to attend rehabilitation sessions. The following year, an opportunity for Kim Deal to record some of her new compositions came up when Guided by Voices abandoned a recording session that she was producing, and she was able to use leftover studio time. Trying to distract her sister from her drug problems, Deal recruited Kelley to play on three songs. Kelley's involvement changed Deal's mind about her current project being solo, and she began to conceptualize the album as a band release.

Wiggs chose not to work with Deal in the mid-90s—she was instead involved with multiple projects with members of Luscious Jackson—and there have been different accounts for why. In 2013, Wiggs said to interviewers including Spin's Amanda Petrusich that in 1995 she had offered to rejoin if the next album would be a Breeders' release, but that she was convinced Deal wanted to do a side project. Deal told Petrusich that she had wanted to record as the Breeders in 1995, but that Wiggs declined to be involved, wishing to take some time off.

Whatever Deal's motivation, in 1995 she formed a group named the Amps, with fellow Daytonians Macpherson, Luis Lerma, and Nate Farley; Kelley had to leave the project due to her drug treatment. In 1996, Deal reformed the Breeders using the Amps' lineup of herself, Macpherson, Farley, and Lerma, as well as Carrie Bradley and Michelle Bodine. In several interviews in 1997, Deal complained that she had formed the Amps out of respect for Kelley and Wiggs, who needed time off, but that even in May 1996, around the end of the Amps' touring, Kelley and Wiggs still told her that they were not yet ready to rejoin the Breeders; Deal wished then that she had instead recruited Farley and Lerma for the Breeders in 1994 after Lollapalooza, instead of forming the Amps.

During Deal's attempted recording sessions in 1997, bandmates and studio musicians found her behavior and demanding musical standards to create a difficult working environment; members including Macpherson quit the group. Deal has recalled of Macpherson's departure that he "took his drums and I never saw him again. E-ver. And it hurt my heart, cos he’s such a great guy and I felt dumb and I’m sure he did too, whatever, we don’t even know"; Macpherson recalls that for 15 years "Kim thought I hated her, and I thought she hated me". By the time of the Breeders' next album, 2002's Title TK, Mando Lopez, José Medeles, and Richard Presley had replaced Wiggs and Macpherson; this same lineup, without Presley, performed on 2008's Mountain Battles and the Fate to Fatal EP (2009). (Note: Although Wiggs was not a regular band member at this point, she played bass for the final three shows of the 2009 tour, because Lopez's wife was having a baby.) Meanwhile, Deal joined multiple reunion tours by the Pixies between 2004 and 2011, before officially quitting this group in 2013.

Kim Deal has recalled that in the spring of 2012: "Kelley was on the couch ... and she said in a year it will be the 20th anniversary for Last Splash, and she wondered if [Wiggs and Macpherson] would do shows with us." When Kim texted Wiggs, and Kelley contacted Macpherson, they found both enthusiastic about the prospect of reuniting for a 2013 tour. Following the initial contact, there were several months of waiting before more concrete plans could be made, during which "there was a process of getting people involved, booking agents and promoters", and waiting for organizers to begin planning music festivals. The Deal sisters received the blessing of existing members Lopez and Medeles to work with Wiggs and Macpherson again. (Note: The Deals' reunion with Wiggs and Macpherson was initially conceived as being possibly temporary. Lopez has been in Morrissey's band since the mid-2010s, playing on albums beginning with Low in High School (2017). Medeles currently plays in the Portland, Oregon instrumental group 1939 Ensemble.)

== Performances ==
The Breeders performed sixty concerts in 2013 for the LSXX Tour. The band performed a warm-up concert on March 29 at the Bell House in Brooklyn; however, it was noted that this date was not considered an official part of the tour. Twenty-one initial shows were scheduled from May 3 to June 21, with eight stops in the United States, twelve in Europe, and one in Toronto, Canada. Further concerts were later added to the spring schedule, including a May 2 show at Oberlin College in the Breeders' home state of Ohio, and music festivals in Alabama and in Nîmes, France. The tour was subsequently expanded to include dates in South America, North America, and Australia from July to October, and additional performances in the U.S. in December, finally concluding with a New Year's Eve performance in Austin, Texas. Support bands on the tour included the Connections, Parquet Courts, Beach Day, Speedy Ortiz, and Imperial Teen.

On each date of the tour, the Breeders performed the entire Last Splash album. Another song they added later in the tour was "Walking with a Killer", which Kim Deal had originally released in 2012 as an independent solo 7" single; a full-band studio version of this composition was later released on the Breeders' 2018 album All Nerve.

== Dates ==
List of concert dates, cities, countries, and venues
Date (2013)	City	Country	Venue or event
May 2	Oberlin College	United States	Dionysus Discotheque
May 3	Pennsylvania	United States	Mr. Smalls Theater
May 4	Washington, DC	United States	9:30 Club
May 5	Philadelphia	United States	Trocadero Theatre
May 6	New York City	United States	Webster Hall
May 9	Boston	United States	Royal Nightclub
May 11	Toronto	Canada	Danforth Music Hall
May 12	Detroit	United States	Majestic Theatre
May 14	Nashville	United States	Mercy Lounge
May 15	Atlanta	United States	Variety Playhouse
May 17	Gulf Shores	United States	Hangout Festival
May 18	Gulf Shores	United States	Hangout Festival
May 19	Gulf Shores	United States	Hangout Festival
May 24	Barcelona	Spain	Primavera Sound
May 25	Nîmes	France	This is Not a Love Song Festival
May 27	Toulouse	France	Le Bikini
May 28	Bordeaux	France	Le Rocher
May 30	Porto	Portugal	Primavera Sound
June 1	Paris	France	Le Trianon
June 2	Brussels	Belgium	Ancienne Belgique
June 3	Amsterdam	The Netherlands	Paradiso
June 14	Dublin	Ireland	Vicar Street
June 15	Belfast	Northern Ireland	The Limelight
June 17	Glasgow	Scotland	ABC
June 18	Manchester	England	Ritz
June 19	London	England	Forum
June 21	Camber Sands	England	All Tomorrow's Parties
July 20	Chicago	United States	Pitchfork Music Festival
July 24	São Paulo	Brazil	Cina Joia
July 25	Rio de Janeiro	Brazil	Circo Vaodor
July 27	Santiago	Chile	Ex Oz
August 3	Montreal	Canada	Osheaga Festival
August 10	Richmond	United States	Sound City
August 23	Los Angeles	United States	El Rey Theatre
August 24	Los Angeles	United States	FYF Fest
August 26	Santa Cruz	United States	Rio Theatre
August 27	San Francisco	United States	The Fillmore
August 28	San Francisco	United States	The Fillmore
August 30	Portland	United States	Wonder Ballroom
August 31	Vancouver	Canada	Commodore Ballroom
September 1	Seattle	United States	Bumbershoot Music & Arts Festival
September 6	Knoxville	United States	Bijou Theatre
September 7	Raleigh	United States	Hopscotch Music Festival
September 27	Champaign-Urbana	United States	Pygmalion Music Festival
September 28	Cincinnati	United States	MidPoint Music Festival
October 9	Miami	United States	Grand Central
October 13	Mexico City	Mexico	Corona Capital Festival
October 26	Melbourne	Australia	All Tomorrow's Parties
October 28	Sydney	Australia	Enmore Theatre
October 29	Brisbane	Australia	Tivoli Theatre
October 31	Perth	Australia	Astor Theatre
December 12	Minneapolis	United States	First Avenue
December 13	Madison	United States	High Noon Saloon
December 14	Chicago	United States	Metro
December 16	Cleveland	United States	Beachland Ballroom
December 18	Boston	United States	Paradise
December 19	New York City	United States	Webster Hall
December 20	New York City	United States	Webster Hall
December 29	New Orleans	United States	One Eyed Jacks
December 31	Austin	United States	The Mohawk
