= The Breeders Tour 2017 =

2017 concert tour

- Tour by the Breeders
- Start date: October 10, 2017
- End date: November 13, 2017
- No. of shows: 21

the Breeders concert chronology
- Tour 2014; Tour 2017; Tour 2018

The Breeders' 2017 tour consisted of twenty-one concerts in Europe and the United States. A date in Dublin was canceled due to Hurricane Orphelia. They opened for Arcade Fire at two of the dates. Compositions that the Breeders played on the tour included their 2017 single "Wait in the Car", the Pixies' "Gigantic", and songs by the Amps.

== Performances and reception ==
The Breeders began their 2017 tour with a "warm-up show" at the Southgate House Revival-Sanctuary music venue in Newport, Kentucky on October 10, with opening act Vacation. They then traveled to the United Kingdom for mid-October performances in Glasgow and Manchester, and an October 18 show in London. A concert in Dublin on October 16 was canceled because of Hurricane Orphelia. From October 22 to 27, the group played five concerts in mainland Europe, in Amsterdam, Antwerp, Berlin, Copenhagen, and Paris. For these and for the UK shows, the group PINS opened for them. The Breeders then returned to the US for end-of-month 40-minute sets supporting Arcade Fire in St. Paul and Chicago.

In early November, the Breeders performed with the group Flasher opening for them, in Detroit, Boston, and Washington, D.C., followed by dates in Philadelphia and New York City, with Vacation opening again. They then played the five shows on the West Coast between November 8 and 13, in Portland, Seattle, San Francisco (two shows), and Los Angeles; Melkbelly was the support band for this final leg of the tour.

The band played songs from throughout their career. From their first two albums, Pod (1990) and Last Splash (1993), they performed selections including "Fortunately Gone", "Happiness Is a Warm Gun", "No Aloha", "Invisible Man", and "Cannonball". They played "Off You" from Title TK (2002), as well as "Bang On" and "Night of Joy" from Mountain Battles (2008). From their then-forthcoming album All Nerve (2018), the Breeders performed "Archangels Thunderbird", "Walking with a Killer", and their 2017 single "Wait in the Car". Other compositions they played included songs Kim Deal's previous bands the Pixies ("Gigantic") and the Amps ("Pacer", "I Am Decided", and "Tipp City").

About their October 17 concert in Manchester, The Skinny's Joe Goggin wrote that "even as they’re settling slowly back into the saddle, the Breeders have lost little of their daring". Kitty Empire of The Guardian praised their performance of "Wait in the Car" on October 18 at the Electric Ballroom in London. A reviewer at the Indiepoprock website wrote that their performance at Trix in Antwerp on October 23 was charming. In St. Paul on October 29, Chris Riemenschneider of Star Tribune commented that the Breeders' performance "confirmed they’re still very much a contender"; City Pages' Erik Thompson called their performance "endearingly shambolic" but stated it would have sounded better at a smaller venue rather than in a "slowly filling arena". The Vinyl District's Brigit Gallagher reported looking forward to the Breeders' upcoming 2018 album based on the "stellar" new songs the group performed at United Center in Chicago. Regarding this same show, Andy Argyrakis of National Rock Review said that the band "never once came across dated throughout 40 meaningful minutes".

== Dates ==
List of concert dates, cities, countries, venues, and support bands
Date (2017)	City	Country	Venue	Support
October 10	Newport	United States	The Southgate House Revival-Sanctuary	Vacation
October 15	Glasgow	United Kingdom	ABC	PINS
October 17	Manchester	United Kingdom	Academy 2	PINS
October 18	London	United Kingdom	Electric Ballroom	PINS
October 22	Amsterdam	Netherlands	Melkweg Max	PINS
October 23	Antwerp	Belgium	Trix	PINS
October 24	Berlin	Germany	Heimathafen	PINS
October 25	Copenhagen	Denmark	Vega	PINS
October 27	Paris	France	La Gaîté Lyrique	PINS
October 29	St. Paul	United States	Xcel Energy Center	Arcade Fire (headliner)
October 30	Chicago	United States	United Center	Arcade Fire (headliner)
November 1	Detroit	United States	Magic Stick	Flasher
November 3	Boston	United States	The Sinclair	Flasher
November 4	Washington	United States	Lincoln Theatre	Flasher
November 5	New York	United States	Bowery Ballroom	Vacation
November 6	Philadelphia	United States	Union Transfer	Vacation
November 8	Portland	United States	Wonder Ballroom	Melkbelly
November 9	Seattle	United States	The Showbox	Melkbelly
November 11	San Francisco	United States	The Rickshaw Stop	Melkbelly
November 12	San Francisco	United States	The Independent	Melkbelly
November 13	Los Angeles	United States	El Rey Theatre	Melkbelly
