= Son of Three =

2002 single by the Breeders

Single by the Breeders

from the album Title TK
- B-side: "Buffy Theme", "Safari"
- Released: September 2, 2002
- Recorded: 2000–2002 (album version); July 2002 (single version)
- Studio: Grandmaster Recording Ltd. (Los Angeles) (album version); Track Record (North Hollywood) (single version)
- Genre: Alternative rock; punk rock
- Length: 2:08 (album version); 1:52 (single version)
- Label: 4AD
- Songwriter: Kim Deal
- Producers: Steve Albini; Mark Arnold; Andrew Alekel; (album version): Ai Fujisaki; Justin Hamilton; Marc Arnold; (single version)

The Breeders singles chronology
"Huffer" (2002)	"Son of Three" (2002)	"We're Gonna Rise" (2008)

Audio sample
- The Breeders' "Son of Three" single was recorded "at breakneck speed, matching their live show velocity". Reviewers have described the song's sound as "bubblegum grunge" and "dark punk".: file; help

"Son of Three" is a song by the American group the Breeders. Composed and sung by Kim Deal, its original version was recorded at Grandmaster Recording Ltd. in Hollywood, and was released in May 2002 on the album Title TK. The Breeders—then consisting of Deal, Kelley Deal, Jose Medeles, Richard Presley, and Mando Lopez—later re-recorded "Son of Three" at a different Hollywood studio as Title TK's third European single. This subsequent recording is shorter and faster than the album track, and matches how they were playing the song in concert in 2002.

The "Son of Three" single was released in September 2002 on 4AD, and reached No. 72 in the United Kingdom. The single includes a live performance of the group's 1992 song "Safari" and a cover of Nerf Herder's theme from the Buffy the Vampire Slayer television series. Deal was a Buffy fan, and negotiated to have the Breeders appear in an episode of the show.

Critics have praised both the album and single versions of "Son of Three".

== Recording ==
The original version of "Son of Three" appeared on the Breeders' 2002 album Title TK. While most of the album's tracks were recorded by Steve Albini at his Electrical Audio studio in Chicago, "Son of Three" is one of two songs from a session recorded by Mark Arnold and Andrew Alekel at Grandmaster Recording Ltd. in Hollywood. The composition was written by Kim Deal, who also sang on the track. The other musicians who played on the recording were Kim's sister Kelley Deal on guitar and vocals; Richard Presley on guitar; Mando Lopez on bass and guitar; and Jose Medeles on percussion.

Following the release of Title TK's first two singles, "Off You" and "Huffer", a third single was requested for the European market. For this purpose, the Breeders decided to record a new version of "Son of Three". The session, which took place in July 2002 at Track Record Studios in North Hollywood, was fit in during a short break between a European and a US concert tour. This recording is faster than the album version, and reflects the sound of the group's live performances of the song in 2002. The engineers for this session were Ai Fujisaki and Justin Hamilton, with additional engineering credited to Marc Arnold. (Note: The spelling of Arnold's first name differs between the credits in the Title TK album (Mark) and the "Son of Three" single (Marc).)

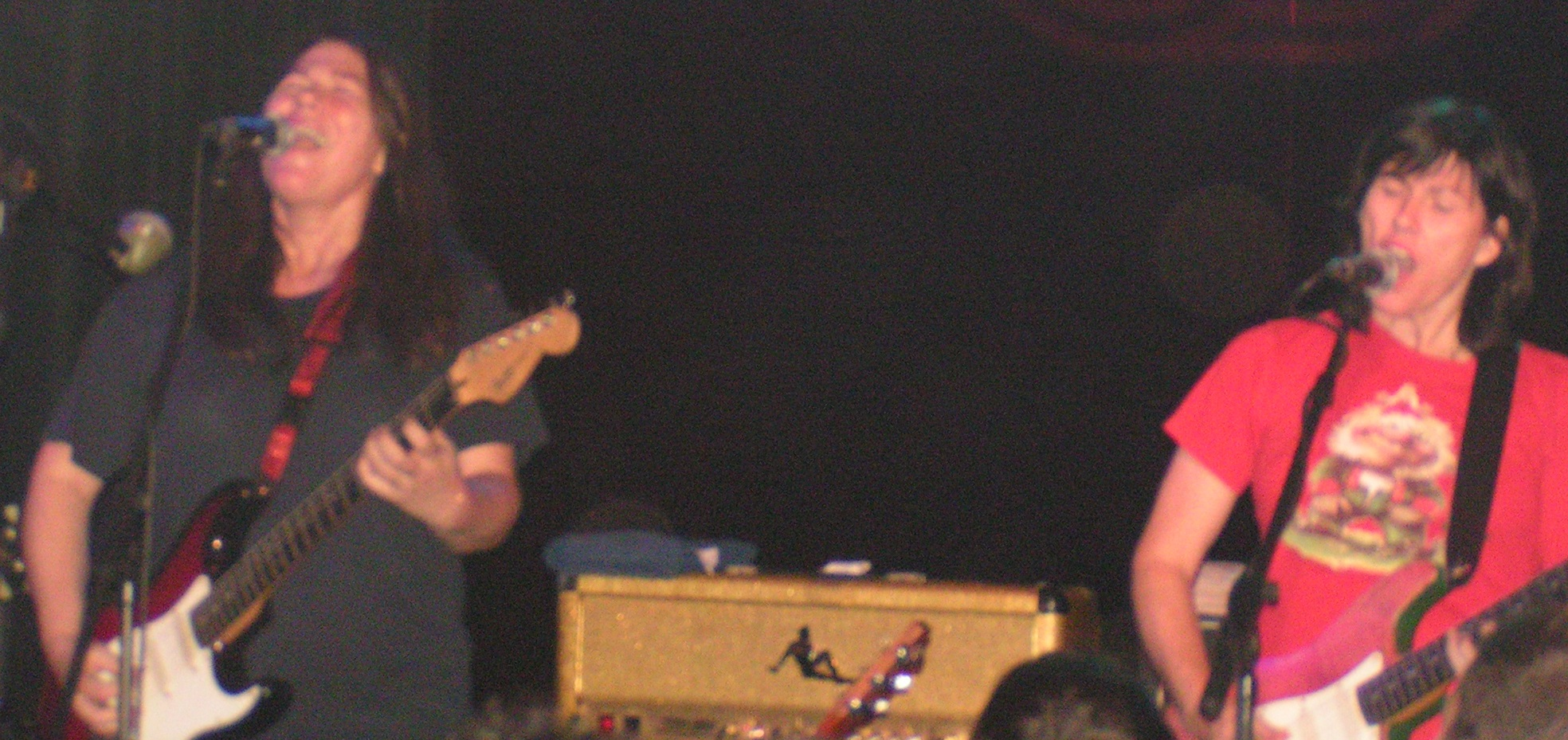
Kim Deal (left) her sister Kelley (right) were reportedly devotees of the Buffy the Vampire Slayer TV series in 2002. As the Breeders, they covered its theme song as one of the "Son of Three" single's two B-sides.

The sound of "Son of Three" has been described as "dark punk", and elsewhere as a "garage symphony of bubblegum grunge, woo-woo gurly harmonies and body-snatching sci-fi eeriness". One interviewer in 2002 described the lyrics of "Son of Three" as "motorific", noting the numerous references to driving in the song and throughout the Title TK album. The song's lyrics include lines such as "No more time on the meter", "Cross another county line", and "Are we there?"

The second track on the three-song single, "Buffy Theme", was also recorded at the July 2002 session. This composition was originally performed by the group Nerf Herder, whose version was included on Buffy the Vampire Slayer: The Album. It was written by Nerf Herder members Dennis, Grip, and Sherlock. Kim and Kelley Deal were both fans of the Buffy the Vampire Slayer television show and had been playing "Buffy Theme" in concert in the first half of 2002. At some point after the July recording session, Kim Deal telephoned Buffy musical supervisor John King to ask whether the Breeders could be on the show. On November 5, the group appeared on the episode "Him", in which they performed "Son of Three" and "Little Fury". The Breeders' "Buffy Theme" was also later included on the album Buffy the Vampire Slayer: Radio Sunnydale.

The final track on the "Son of Three" single, "Safari", written by Deal, was recorded in concert at the Melkweg music venue in Amsterdam in June 2002 as part of the Leidsekade Live radio show. The original studio version of the song had been released on the Breeders' Safari EP in April 1992.

== Release and reception ==
Title TK came out on May 20–21, 2002, and the "Son of Three" single on September 2 of that year. The single reached No. 72 on the UK Singles Chart. The album and single versions of "Son of Three" have mostly been well received by critics. AllMusic's Heather Phares called the Title TK track "sweet [and] playfully spiky", while Will Bryant of Pitchfork cited it as a "standout" of the album, that "get[s] the job done". PopMatters' Matt Cibula reported "rockin'... hard" to the song and commented on the originality of the lyrics, such as the line “If I find the door / I am the son of Go”. A reviewer at Contactmusic.com described the single version of "Son of Three" as "special", and for NME's Stephen Dalton, it was a "jewel". Richard Garnett of Leeds Music Scene similarly praised the track, commenting that "the beefy descending bass line is enough to send shivers".

Critical appraisal of the single's B-sides has been mixed. Stephen Thomas Erlewine of AllMusic characterized the Breeders' "Buffy Theme" as "wonderful". Garnett called the track "cheap", noting its short running time (1 minute 13 seconds). For Dalton, the recording amounted to "a comedy cover", and the live version of "Safari" was "inessential". By contrast, the Contactmusic.com reviewer rated this performance of "Safari" as "fantastic".

== Track listing ==
No.	Title	Writer(s)	Length
1.	"Son of Three"	Kim Deal	1:52
2.	"Buffy Theme"	Dennis, Grip, Sherlock	1:13
3.	"Safari" (Live)	Kim Deal	3:59

== Charts ==
Chart (2002)	Peak position
UK Singles Chart	72
