= The Breeders Tour 2009 =

2009 concert tour

- Tour by the Breeders
- Start date: August 5, 2009
- End date: August 23, 2009
- No. of shows: 16

the Breeders concert chronology
- Tour 2008; Tour 2009; LSXX Tour (2013)

The Breeders' 2009 tour consisted of sixteen North American dates in August 2009. The tour was in support of their EP Fate to Fatal. The lineup for the band in 2009 consisted of sisters Kim and Kelley Deal, Mando Lopez, Jose Medeles, and Cheryl Lindsey. Former member Josephine Wiggs played bass for the final three shows, because Lopez's wife was having a baby. Songs the group performed included "The She", "Little Fury", "Night of Joy", "New Year", "Fate to Fatal", "Divine Hammer", "No Aloha", "Iris", and "Walk It Off". They also played the Amps' "I Am Decided" and "Tipp City".

== Dates ==
List of concert dates, cities, venues, and support groups
Date (2009)	City	Country	Venue	Support
August 5	Newport	United States	Southgate House	Times New Viking
August 6	Indianapolis	United States	The Vogue	Times New Viking
August 7	St. Louis	United States	Blueberry Hill	Times New Viking
August 8	Lawrence	United States	The Bottleneck	Times New Viking
August 9	Omaha	United States	The Slowdown	Times New Viking
August 11	Minneapolis	United States	Fine Line	Whispertown 2000
August 12	Madison	United States	Majestic Theater	Whispertown 2000
August 13	Chicago	United States	Double Door	Whispertown 2000
August 14	Pontiac	United States	The Crofoot	Whispertown 2000
August 15	Toronto	Canada	Lee's Palace	Whispertown 2000
August 17	Boston	United States	Paradise	Whispertown 2000
August 18	New York City	United States	Bowery Ballroom	Whispertown 2000
August 19	New York City	United States	Bowery Ballroom	Whispertown 2000
August 21	Washington	United States	Black Cat	Whispertown 2000
August 22	Pittsburgh	United States	Diesel	Whispertown 2000
August 23	Columbus	United States	Newport Music Hall	Whispertown 2000
