= Dewey Defeats Truman (band) =

American indie rock band

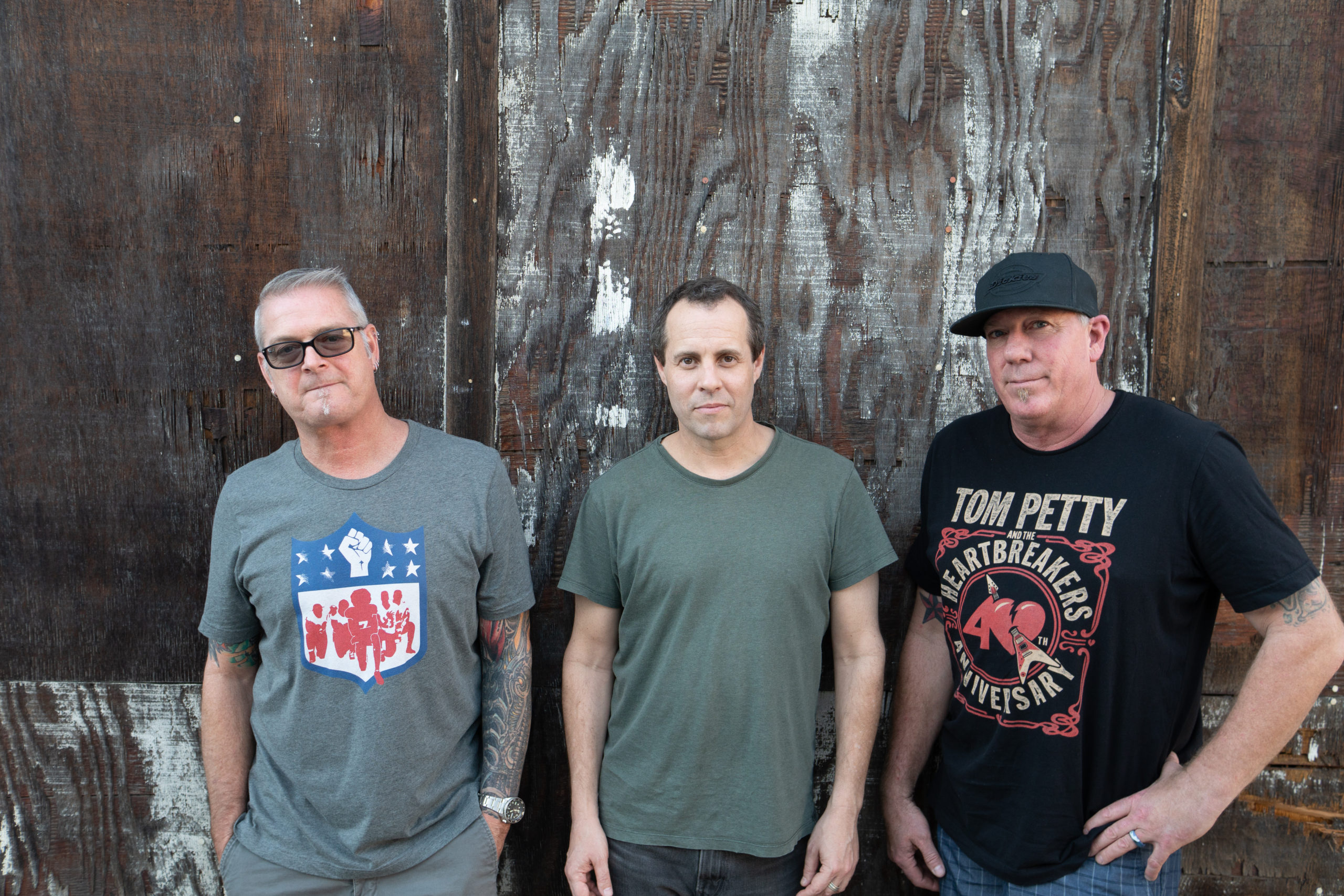
- Left to right: James Reader, Mark MacBride, Scott Frazier

Background information
- Origin: San Diego, California, U.S.
- Genres: Indie rock; emo; alternative rock
- Years active: 1998–2003; 2018–present
- Labels: Silver Girl; Has Anyone Ever Told You?
- Members: Mark MacBride; James Reader; Scott Frazier
- Website: deweyrawk.com

Dewey Defeats Truman is an American indie rock band formed in San Diego, California. From their founding in 1998 until late 2003, the band quickly made a name for itself in the California indie rock scene, sharing the stage with bands The Jesus Lizard, Jimmy Eat World, Archers of Loaf, and Kelley Deal, and performing at such festivals as NXNW in Portland, SXSW in Austin, CMJ Music Marathon in New York City. The band continued to play together until late 2003, when they went on an extended hiatus, before reforming in 2018. The band's name comes from a printing of a Chicago Tribune article of the same name, which incorrectly stated that Thomas E. Dewey had defeated Harry S. Truman in the 1948 presidential election.

== History ==
In 1998, members of other local bands, namely Red Dye No. 5 and Luper joined to form Dewey Defeats Truman. James Reader and Scott Frazier joined Mark MacBride at the San Diego rock club The Casbah, where they began to write songs together.

The band quickly found success, touring various festivals, including NXNW in Portland, SXSW in Austin, CMJ Music Marathon in New York City, and opening for acts including Jimmy Eat World and Archers of Loaf, and continued to play across the country until late 2003 when they went on hiatus.

In mid 2018, bassist James Reader was approached by a DJ from local alternative radio station 91X, who asked the band to reform for a series of 30-year anniversary shows the station was running throughout the year. The band agreed and reformed to play the show. Among the success of the comeback show, the band's original label Silver Girl Records re-released the song Blue Ruin with the previously unreleased track Reverse Status, as a 7" single. The bands success quickly resumed, and in the following year they were added to another show celebrating 30 years of the existence of The Casbah, where the band had gotten its start.

The success of their live shows has continued, and Dewey Defeats Truman continues to play sporadic live shows today. Recent shows have included a return to The Casbah, where they opened for June of 44.

== Discography ==
The band's original label Silver Girl Records re-released the song Blue Ruin with the previously unreleased track Reverse Status, as a 7" single. In 2021, the band self-released their first new material in almost 20 years, a self-recorded 2 song digital single titled "Always Waiting in the Wrong Line" to Bandcamp. Later that same year, Dewey Defeats Truman re-entered Doubletime Studios with their original engineer Jeff Forrest and recorded a 5-song E.P. Silver Girl Records released the results of that recording session, "The Way You Shatter", digitally. The release promptly earned the band a nomination for Best Rock Album at the 31st annual San Diego Music Awards. In 2022, Silver Girl released the EP on limited edition clear vinyl and Compact Disc.

Discography 2001–present
Title	Year	Label	Type
B-Sides, Rarities, and Out-Takes	2001	Silver Girl Records	CD, Digital
The Road to Nowhere Maps	2002	Has Anyone Ever Told You? Records	CD, Digital
Blue Ruin b/w Reverse Status 7"	2018	Silver Girl Records	Single
Always Waiting in the Wrong Line	2021	Self Release/Band Camp	Digital single
The Way You Shatter	2022	Silver Girl Records	12" vinyl, CD, Digital
