= Dezra's Quest =

1999 novel by Chris Pierson

- Cover of the first edition
- Author: Chris Pierson
- Language: English
- Series: Bridges of Time
- Genre: Fantasy novel
- Publisher: TSR, Inc.
- Publication date: 1999
- Publication place: United States
- Media type: Print (Paperback)
- Pages: 312
- ISBN: 9780786913688
- OCLC: 41632083

Dezra's Quest is a fantasy novel by Chris Pierson, set in the world of Dragonlance, which is based on the Dungeons & Dragons fantasy role-playing game.

== Plot summary ==
Dark Wood is the home of Ansalon's centaur tribes, where they dwelt in peace, until strife began tearing them apart. A brave young warrior named Trephas sets out for Solace to seek aid from Caramon Majere and his daughter Dezra against a mad chieftain.
