= Spirit of the Wind (novel) =

1998 novel by Chris Pierson

- Cover of the first edition
- Author: Chris Pierson
- Language: English
- Genre: Fantasy novel
- Publisher: TSR, Inc.
- Publication date: 1998
- Publication place: United States
- Media type: Print (Paperback)
- Pages: 346
- ISBN: 9780786911745
- OCLC: 438844052

Spirit of the Wind is a fantasy novel by Chris Pierson, set in the world of Dragonlance, which is based on the Dungeons & Dragons fantasy role-playing game.

== Plot summary ==
This novel is set after the Chaos War. In the east, on the Dairly Plans, the peace is shattered by the threat of the red dragon Malystryx. The kender Kronn-alin Thistleknot travels to Abasasinia with his older sister Catt, where they seek heroes to stop the dragon from destroying Kendermore. Riverwind and his daughter Brightdawn set out on a quest to save the kender from the dragon's wrath.
