= Boom! Boom! Boom! =

Studio album by Kelley Deal 6000
- Released: August 26, 1997
- Length: 41:08
- Label: Nice Records
- Producer: Kelley Deal

Kelley Deal 6000 chronology
Go to the Sugar Altar (1996)	Boom! Boom! Boom! (1997)

Boom! Boom! Boom! is the second album by the Kelley Deal 6000, released in 1997. "Brillo Hunt" was the album's first single; the title refers to the practice of using steel wool to filter crack cocaine.

== Production ==
The album was produced by Deal, who also cowrote or wrote all of the album's songs. It was recorded over a period of two and half weeks in February 1997.

== Critical reception ==
Professional ratings
Review scores
Source	Rating
AllMusic	3/5 stars
Boston Herald	3/4 stars
The Encyclopedia of Popular Music	2/5 stars
Entertainment Weekly	B−
The Guardian	2/5 stars
MusicHound Rock: The Essential Album Guide	3/5 stars
NME	5/10 stars
The Plain Dealer	B
The Times	7/10

Stereo Review wrote that "the sex-rocking 'Shag, the punk-snarling 'Get the Writing Off My Back', and the boom-boom-booming 'Brillo Hunt' are as catchy as anything on Last Splash but more fully arranged." Rolling Stone called Boom! Boom! Boom! "a fun and arty fuck-about of a solo album," writing that "there's a lot of sonic debris here, too: bratty Mouseketeer-like cheers, hokey ditties such as 'Stripper' and arbitrary instrumentation like military snare drums and penny whistles." The Columbus Dispatch concluded: "While several cuts spill over with resonating guitar pop, many ride the fence between full-on heavy metal and numbing alt-rock. While the latter is inoffensive, its impact is ephemeral at best."

The Guardian deemed the album "splenetic punky numbers one minute, lovelorn crooning the next," writing that it "veers between the actually-quite-good and arrant nonsense." The Albuquerque Journal determined that "though most of the 15 songs (like the loosely structured 'Stripper', a sort of poke at the dancing profession, and the drumroll march of 'Total War') are experimental to be sure, there are still a couple of radio-ready pop gems, like the album opener, 'Shag', and 'Confidence Girl'." The Boston Herald remarked that "the odd 'When He Calls Me Kitten' transfixes with a bizarre Ann-Margret-visits-the-Mississippi-Delta-blues vibe." The Plain Dealer thought that "while [Sugar Altar's] lyrics seemed to evade serious issues, [Deal]'s now developing an oblique, personal language to explore them."

== Track listing ==
All tracks composed by Kelley Deal; except where indicated

1. "Shag" (Marty Nedich) – 2:26
2. "Future Boy" – 2:11
3. "Baby I'm King" – 3:27
4. "When He Calls Me Kitten" – 3:23
5. "Brillo Hunt" – 3:34
6. "Box" – 2:24
7. "Stripper" – 2:02
8. "Where Did The Home Team Go" – 3:58
9. "Confidence Girl" (Todd Mund, Marty Nedich) – 2:39
10. "Total War" (Nick Hook) – 1:53
11. "Scary" – 3:11
12. "My Boyfriend Died" – 2:42
13. "[Drum Solo]" – 0:28
14. "Skylark" (Brent Sigmeth) – 4:06
15. "Get the Writing off My Back" – 2:44

== Personnel ==
- Kelley Deal - vocals, bass, lead & rhythm guitar
- Todd Mund - lead & rhythm guitar, vocals
- Marty Nedich - bass, vocals
- Todd Johnson - drums
- Nick Hook - drums
- Jimmy Swann - lead guitar on "Get the Writing off My Back"
- Jed Luhmann - drums on "Total War"
- Jimmy Chamberlin (as "JC") - drums on "Baby I'm King"
