= Wait in the Car =

Single by the Breeders

from the album All Nerve
- Released: October 3, 2017
- Genre: Pop punk
- Length: 2:02
- Label: 4AD
- Songwriters: Kim Deal; Richard Presley

The Breeders singles chronology
"Walk It Off" (2008)	"Wait in the Car" (2017)	"All Nerve" (2018)

Music video
- "Wait in the Car" on YouTube

"Wait in the Car" is a song by American alternative rock band the Breeders. Written by Kim Deal and Richard Presley, it was released on October 3, 2017, via 4AD, as the lead single from their 2018 album All Nerve. The song marks the first new music from the band since 2009, when they released their EP Fate to Fatal.

== Background ==
On September 19, 2017, the Breeders teased the song by posting a 10-second clip on Twitter, in which "a rhythmic guitar riff and exclamations of 'Good morning!'" can be heard. Kelley Deal, lead guitarist of the Breeders, said of first reuniting for the recording sessions: "Everyone is the f***ing same! And it's bizarre. And a little bit embarrassing."

== Critical reception ==
Caryn Ganz of The New York Times wrote that the song "sounds less like the spacier explorations of the Deals' 2008 album 'Mountain Battles' and more like the crispy rock of the band's 1990 debut, 'Pod.'" Jon Blistein of Rolling Stone deemed the song "a classic Breeders bruiser" that is "packed with punchy drums, sugar-rush power chords and lead riffs". Winston Cook-Wilson of Spin believes that the song is "a typically energetic, wry, angular rocker". Stephen Thompson of NPR called the song "a blurt of jolting joy that opens with a welcome exclamation — "Good morning!" — before rumbling through two minutes of sunny menace". Lisa Nguyen of Paste felt "The Breeders keep the '90s alive with the spunky new track" and that the song "invigorates its listeners with punchy guitar riffs and quirky lyrics". She praised Kim Deal for ranging her vocals "from soothing oohs to aggressive exclamations". Under the Radar opined that the song "continues in the band's peerless tradition of urgent hooks and angelic vocals from sisters Kim and Kelley Deal", calling it a "miniature pop punk anthem". Robin Murray of Clash thinks the song is "hair-raising, fantastic alt rock as only The Breeders can provide". Gabriela Claymore of Stereogum described the song as "short, razor-sharp and funny", writing that it is "the kind of spunky and energizing song we've come to expect from this great band". Rachel Kraus of Mashable wrote: "On 'Wait in the Car,' The Breeders' signature sound is back. It's brash, sexy, and rebellious like the best of band (as in the hit single 'Cannonball.')" Artistdirect wrote that the song "features hard rocking with defiant lyrics", regarding it as "a continuation of the band's 90's edge". Julian Marszalek of Gigwise felt the song "contains all the right ingredients for The Breeders at their best", including "some stop-start riffing, gnarly guitars, a superbly ramshackle approach that suggests that the whole thing could fall apart at any second, cooing vocals and more hooks than a fisherman's bag". Dan Oberbruner of Tiny Mix Tapes wrote: "'Wait in the Car' is as unstoppably buoyant as the best tracks from their nearly three-decade long career".

== Music video ==
The accompanying music video was directed by Chris Bigg and Martin Masai Andersen, who also compiled the song's cover art. It features over 800 images of "subjects ranging from song lyrics to abstractions of bricks". Bigg and Andersen explained the thought process behind the video in a statement: "It all started with a brick. We both liked the idea of using something iconic yet quite banal. An old brick has a story, and it's a beautiful raw object. We started collecting more and more (some intact, some broken) and realized how different they all appear, each one having its own identity." Winston Cook-Wilson of Spin called the visual "a rapid-fire slideshow featuring bits of lyrics, abstract images, and distorted images of the band".
