= Divine Hammer =

2002 novel by Chris Pierson

- Divine Hammer book cover
- Author: Chris Pierson
- Cover artist: Marc Fishman
- Language: English
- Series: Kingpriest Trilogy, Dragonlance
- Genre: Fantasy novel
- Publisher: Wizards of the Coast
- Publication date: October, 2002 (mass market paperback)
- Publication place: United States
- Media type: Print (Paperback)
- Pages: 341 pp
- ISBN: 0-7869-2807-7
- OCLC: 50711627
- LC Class: CPB Box no. 2067 vol. 10
- Preceded by: Chosen of the Gods
- Followed by: Sacred Fire

Divine Hammer is a fantasy novel set in the Dragonlance campaign series and is the second of a trilogy about a Kingpriest of Istar, Beldinas Pilofiro, and is set during his reign of Istar.

== Plot summary ==
The book begins with Nusendaran (Andras's master), and Andras going into a village to sacrifice a black sheep. However, the Divine Hammer ambush them, and they manage to kill Nusendaran, and are aiming for him next. Suddenly, Andras is teleported away by Fistandantilus. They watch Nusendaran burnt at the stake, so Andras desires revenge against the Kingpriest and his forces. Just then, Fistandantilus offers Andras a choice to become his student. He agrees.

Meanwhile, Cathan and the Divine Hammer are eradicating a temple to Chemosh hidden in an abandoned lighthouse. They get onto little longboats, and quickly arrive at the lighthouse. They manage to kill the guards, and work their way down to the main worship hall. The Deathmaster, head priest, aims for Cathan with foul magic, however, Damid, a friend of Cathan's, pushes Cathan away and dies instead. Tithian manages to kill the Deathmaster by throwing his sword at him. After the battle, they receive orders to return to Istar. Cathan also promises to knight Tithian. After returning to Istar, Cathan learns he is to be the escort for the new envoy from the Order of High Sorcery, Leciane, since the previous one died. On the way to the Tower of High Sorcery in Istar to bring her to the palace, the magical olive trees guarding the entrance manage to "persuade" Cathan off the path, causing him to lose his memories of that day. Fortunately, Leciane rescues him, and then he takes her to her quarters in the palace. Later, they head for a tournament held by Cathan's sister. On the way, Leciane is told by the head mage, Vincil, to charm Cathan, however she refuses and lies.

Andras is taken to a ruined building a distance away from Istar, which is where he spends his life until one day, when he knows he's ready to attack the Kingpriest. He manages to summon many quasits (abyssal imps), and sends them to attack the Divine Hammer during the tournament. The Divine Hammer are very weak from the tournament, so many die very quickly, including the Grand Marshal. The Kingpriest attempts to banish the quasito, however a spell of Andras's prevents the godly magic from working. Leciane manages to persuade the Kingpriest to let her try, and she succeeds. They go after Andras, and manage to find many quasito around a ruined building. They deduce that their attacker must live there, so they storm the building. Andras is captured, and to be burnt at the stake. However, just before he is burnt, the Conclave rescues him so that they can levy their punishment on him first. Ironically, Fistandantilus steals Andras away from the Conclave. Andras becomes a fetch with the aid of Fistandantilus, and he takes on the form of the Patriarch of Seldjuk. Leciane manages to persuade the Kingpriest and the head of the Conclave to have a moot, however, Andras, as the Patriarch of Seldjuk, stabs the Kingpriest. The Kingpriest's guards think the Patriarch was mind controlled by the wizards, and so they begin to fight. The wizards quickly realize they can't hold out, so begin to attempt to teleport away. They arrive back in the tower, and find out that Vincil has an axe embedded in his back, and is dying. Since Vincil was Leciane's lover, she kisses him, then he dies. The Kingpriest makes Cathan the new Grand Marshal.

Faced with the prospect of war with the Kingpriest, the wizards knew that they would lose. Therefore, they begin to move all magical artifacts and books, to Wayreth, since the populace isn't ready for artifacts of mass destruction. They also disenchanted those that couldn't be moved. Since Fistandantilus is a renegade, he decides to aid the Kingpriest, sending him some magical seeds that can clear a path through the groves that protect the towers. The Kingpriest distributes the seeds to all of his allies attacking the towers. In Daltigoth, the general decides to attack early. Since the tower wasn't emptied, the Order of High Sorcery decides to destroy the tower, which levels the city. The Kingpriest receives word of this, however doesn't tell any of his other allies attacking the towers, believing it is an attempt by "forces of evil" to sway his holy crusade. Leciane comes to warn Cathan, who is going to attack the tower in Losarcum with the rest of the Divine Hammer. Unfortunately, she is interrupted before she manages to tell Cathan everything. When Cathan and the Divine Hammer attack the tower, Cathan notices that there seems to be a surge of magic in the apex, and quickly realizes the tower will explode. He and Tithian attempt to escape, but are confused by the twisting passages. Leciane finds them and teleports them away, but she takes a fatal wound in the process. Cathan becomes unconscious during the spell, and wakes up days later. By then, Leciane is already dead. Cathan parts with Tithian when they reach Istar, and Cathan decides that what the Kingpriest is doing is evil. He embarrasses the Kingpriest in front of all the courtiers, then leaves Istar. He is never seen again.

Andras begins to feel guilty about what he has done, and wishes to undo it. However, Fistandantilus decides that payment is due then, so takes over Andras's mind. Andras, under Fistandantilus's spell, curses the tower of High Sorcery in Palanthas, so that no one will be allowed into the tower until the master of the past and present claims the tower. Fistandantilus threatens the Kingpriest's, by becoming his enemy if he doesn't let Fistandantilus join the Kingpriest's court. The Kingpriest is forced to agree.

== Main characters ==
- Cathan MarSevrin - A senior marshal, and the first member of the Divine Hammer.
- Tithian - Cathan's squire.
- Leciane - A red-robed sorceress, an envoy of the Order of High Sorcery in Istar.
- Andras - A black-robed mage who longs for revenge against Istar.
- Fistandantilus - A powerful renegade black robe, Andras's teacher.
- Beldinas Pilofiro - The Kingpriest.

== Reviews ==
- Chronicle
