= To come (publishing) =

Phrase used in publishing to indicate missing material

"To come" is a printing and journalism reference, commonly abbreviated to "TK". The abbreviation is used to mark where additional material will be added to a manuscript before publication. It is used without periods.

The use of the abbreviation is to prevent the phrase "to come" from being mistaken as a deliberate part of the text.

Because very few English words feature the letter combination TK, it is more easily searchable than TC. The abbreviation TK and the repeated TKTK are "unique and visually arresting" strings that are both easily seen in running text.

== Criticism ==
This shorthand is described as "imprecise" in a Q&A on the website of the Chicago Manual of Style, which advises,

It's best to be more straightforward and specific. For example, use bullets or boldface zeros (••• or 000) to stand in for page numbers that cannot be determined until a manuscript is paginated as a book (but see paragraph 2.37 in CMOS). For items like missing figures, describe exactly what's missing. In electronic environments, you have recourse to comment features, like the <!--comment--> syntax of SGML, which allows for descriptive instructions that will not interfere with the final version of a document.

== See also ==
- Title TK – 2002 alternative rock album by The Breeders
- Lorem ipsum
