= Chosen of the Gods =

2001 novel by Chris Pierson

- Chosen Of the Gods book cover
- Author: Chris Pierson
- Cover artist: Marc Fishman
- Language: English
- Series: Kingpriest Trilogy, Dragonlance
- Genre: Fantasy novel
- Publisher: Wizards of the Coast
- Publication date: November 2001
- Publication place: United States
- Media type: Print (Paperback)
- Pages: 344 pp (first edition, paperback)
- ISBN: 0-7869-1902-7 (first edition, paperback)
- OCLC: 48235988
- LC Class: CPB Box no. 2280 vol. 12
- Followed by: Divine Hammer

Chosen of the Gods is a fantasy novel set in the Dragonlance campaign series, and is the first of a trilogy about the Kingpriest of Istar, Beldinas Pilofiro.

== Plot introduction ==
Chosen of the Gods is set in Istar during the reign of Symeon IV, Kurnos the Usurper, and Beldinas Pilofiro.

== Plot summary ==
Cathan is called back to his house to discover that his brother has died of the Longosai, a plague, and that he and Wentha are the only remaining members of their clan. Having prayed to Paladine every day to heal his brother, he rips down the symbol of Paladine from the wall of their house, since Paladine didn't answer his requests. Having no family left except for his sister, Wentha, he joins some bandits led by Baron Tavarre. Baron Tavarre gained an intense hate of clerists after a loved member of his family died, because the clerists in Istar wouldn't help him. However, he is not the only one that feels that way, as many other bandits joined only after their family died of the Longosai because the clerists ignored them. This hate influences the actions of Cathan, when on a rainy day they ambush a fat clergyman heading for Govinna with a tarp against the rain held by his guards. Cathan slings a piece of the symbol of Paladine at the clerist, knocking him out. The bandits quickly disarm the guards, and Cathan, seeing the fat and richly robed clergymen feels disgust, and so kicks him, earning himself a reprimand from Lord Tavarre, as he is now called.

Meanwhile, in Istar, the Kingpriest of Istar, Symeon IV, calls a meeting of his most trusted advisers, and to break the news that Kurnos the Usurper is going to become his heir once he dies, as he has seen portents of his death. He and his advisers also debate whether do send the Imperial Army against bandits who attacked the clergymen, but Ilista, First Daughter of Paladine, and Loralon, emissary of the elves, counsel against it. The Kingpriest then adjourns the meeting to meditate. That night, Ilista has dreams of a Lightbringer, so she asks for the approval of the Kingpriest, and then with his approval sets out. Later in the day, during a game of khas with Kurnos, Symeon falls over unconscious. Kurnos then hears a dark voice in his head; "Let him die." Unknown to him at the time, the voice came from Fistandantilus. Kurnos refuses to listen to it and calls for help.

After returning to their bandit camp, Cathan is called back to his village, where he finds out that Wentha has caught the Longosai. He leaves her in the care of Widow Fendrilla almost as soon as he arrives, desiring even more revenge against the clergymen. After returning, he learns that they have united with other bandits and plan to attack Govinna, the only walled city in the highlands. The bandits split up into groups, and enter Govinna undetected. Cathan is told to guard an alley, but he really wants to be part of the fighting. However, he remains at his post. Meanwhile, the rest of the bandits quickly capture the city, but Durinen, the Little Emperor of the highlands escapes. Durinen emerges through a secret tunnel close to where Cathan is posted, and so is captured and placed under house arrest.

Back in Istar, Kurnos learns that Symeon will most likely live until the fall, which he feels is too long a wait. Fistandantilus offers his aid, and so Kurnos reluctantly accepts it, in the form of a demon, Sathira, bound within a ring. Kurnos tells Sathira to kill Symeon in a "natural way", and so Kurnos is crowned Kingpriest soon after.

Ilista searches far and wide, however does not find any sign of the Lightbringer. Soon, she begins to doubt herself, and begins to consider turning back until she receives a message telling her to go to an abandoned monastery, where she will find the Lightbringer. On the way to the monastery, she is attacked by evil monsters, but is rescued by a humble monk, Brother Beldyn, who will become known to the world as "the Lightbringer." With the Lightbringer, she sets back out for Istar, taking an overland route through the highlands. However, unbeknownst to her and her party, the highlands have been taken over by the bandits. Just after setting out, she, her guards, and the Lightbringer are captured by the bandits. A guard was mortally injured in the battle, and Beldyn pleads with the bandits to allow him to heal the guard. The bandits reluctantly agree, and Beldyn manages to heal the guard. With a healing miracle in their midst, the bandits quickly support the Lightbringer, and pleading with him to heal their friends, family, and villages. Cathan is among the others that beg for healing, and luckily manages to have him heal his sister. After arriving in their village, Beldyn not only heals his sister, but everyone in the village too. Cathan then swears allegiance to Beldinas.

In Istar, Kurnos learns of the capture of Govinna, and that Ilista found the Lightbringer. However, instead of accepting Beldinas, he feels threatened, deciding to send Sathira to kill him. He also sends the Imperial Army, or the Scatas, to kill the bandits.

Durinen attempts to commit suicide, ending up with a mortal wound; however, Beldyn manages to heal him, convincing the Little Emperor that Beldyn is the true Kingpriest. The Little Emperor then reveals the location of the Crown of Power, an artifact that allows the wielder to claim the mantle of Kingpriest, and that has been lost since the time of Pradian. Unluckily, before Durinen finishes, Sathira arrives and slays the Little Empire; however he is banished back to the gem by Ilista's sacrifice and death. Everyone in the city mourns for Ilista, as she was unlike the other high clergy — she actually helped the people during her stay. Also, during this time, the Imperial Army reaches Govinna and camps right outside the city. This sets plans into motion as Beldyn and Cathan head into the catacombs in an attempt to retrieve Crown of Power. Cathan emerges later with the crown, but Beldyn is in a coma and cannot be woken. Meanwhile, the situation becomes more dire, as the defenders of Govinna are deserting in the face of the Imperial scatas. Soon, the scatas make their move, and the fight for the city begins. However Beldyn still has not awoken. Cathan prays to Paladine, and the ghost of Pradian, the would-be emperor who hid the crown, appears. Cathan forces Pradian to wake Beldyn, as Pradian does not want to see the crown in the hands of Kurnos, and so Cathan and Beldyn join the fight. In a surprising move, Beldyn breaks the gates of Govinna to let the scatas in. Then, to convince the scatas of his power, Beldyn has Cathan crown him with the Miceram, the Crown of Power, but Sathira appears and lunges for Brother Beldyn. Cathan pushes Beldyn away, and manages to wound Sathira with the pieces of his symbol of Paladine, giving Beldyn time to banish Sathira. Beldyn then puts on the Crown of Power, resulting in a cleansing wave of power spreading through the city. The Scatas realize the power, and swear allegiance to Beldyn.

Later, Beldyn and his newfound army march to Istar, to oust Kurnos. Back in Istar, the heads of the temples receive word of the approaching army, and Beldyn's holy powers, and begin to send votes of "no support" to Kurnos.

That night, Fistandantilus replaces Sathira with a killing spell, instructing Kurnos to use it to kill Beldinas. The next day, Kurnos surrenders without a fight, and when he pretends to beg for forgiveness, he uses the ring on Beldinas. Cathan realizes Kurnos's intent, and jumps in front of Beldinas, saving his life, but dies. However, Beldinas calls on Paladine to resurrect Cathan, and Paladine answers. Cathan is resurrected and Kurnos is thrown into a dungeon, while Beldinas debates what to do with him. However, that night Fistandantilus arrives in Kurnos's cell and unleashes Sathira on Kurnos, letting her kill and mutilate him. When Sathira is done, Fistandantilus uses magic so that Kurnos looks like he died naturally.

== Characters ==
- Cathan MarSevrin - A boy who loses all of his relatives except his sister to an illness called the Longosai. He gets it himself, but fights it off.
- Wentha MarSevrin - Cathan's sister who catches the Longosai, but survives with another's help.
- Kurnos the Ursurper - A kingpriest who used a demon to kill Symeon so that he could inherit the throne faster.
- Symeon IV - The kingpriest before Kurnos who dies because of Kurnos's alliance with Fistandantilus.
- Beldyn - A young monk of Paladine from the streets of Xak Tsaroth, who lives in an abandoned monastery with other priests of his order.
- Fistandantilus - A powerful renegade Black Robed mage.
