= Trail of the Black Wyrm =

2006 novel by Chris Pierson

- Trail of the Black Wyrm book cover
- Author: Chris Pierson
- Cover artist: Matt Stawicki
- Language: English
- Series: Taladas Chronicles, Dragonlance
- Genre: Fantasy novels
- Publisher: Wizards of the Coast
- Publication date: April, 2006 (mass market paperback)
- Publication place: United States
- Media type: Print (Paperback)
- Pages: 406 pp
- ISBN: 0-7869-3979-6
- OCLC: 65637391
- LC Class: CPB Box no. 2457 vol. 8
- Preceded by: Blades of the Tiger
- Followed by: Shadow of the Flame

Trail of the Black Wyrm is a fantasy novel set in the Dragonlance campaign series and is the second of a trilogy about Taladas. The third book in the trilogy is Shadow of the Flame.

== Plot introduction ==
The setting is in Taladas, although it's generally in the jungles of Neron and the Imperial League.

== Plot summary ==
Shedara, Forlo, and Hult, prepare to leave Coldhope Keep, but are attacked by shadow-fiends. The shadow-fiends outnumber them, and are losing as well as badly injured. Luckily, Eldako shows up and manages to kill the rest of the shadow-fiends. They decide to stay in Coldhope Keep until they recover. Later, the Fourth Legion of the Imperial League arrives, intent on arresting Forlo for desertion. Forlo claims he didn't desert, but they are still determined to arrest. Eldako and Shedara manage to escape via a magic levitation spell, by jumping down a cliff. However, Hult is afraid of magic, so he didn't manage to escape. Forlo didn't want the Fourth Legion to capture just Hult, as they would torture him since they wouldn't get himself, so he stayed with Hult and was arrested too. Hult and Forlo are taken back to the capital, Kristophan, and since Eldako and Shedara can't overpower so many minotaurs, they travel back to Armach-nesti to see if they can get help.

At the same time, Essana is in the jungles of Neron, and held captive by the Brethren who are trying to resurrect Maladar. The faces of the Brethren are scarred, and hidden behind hoods, just like Maladar. They want to resurrect Maladar because they believe that Taladas is declining due to war, famine, etc., and that Maladar will reestablish the empire of Aurim, bringing peace and prosperity. There are six of the Faceless Brethren; the Keeper, the Master, the Teacher, the Slayer, the Watcher, and the Speaker. She later learns that the Keeper is secretly a spy for the kings of the Rainward Isles. She is forced to watch them sacrifice elves of the jungle to Maladar.

Meanwhile, the scenario in Armach-nesti is even worse. Thousands of shadow-fiends have invaded the woods, and the elves are hard-pressed to keep them back. The city has been overrun, and it's basically a melee. She discovers that her brother only has sixty elves total in his force, but he still manages to spare some to help rescue Forlo and Hult.

Since Forlo "deserted", he's brought to Rekhaz, who is now the Emperor of the Imperial League. Rekhaz has no pity for Forlo, and declares his life forfeit. Forlo manages to call on his Imperial right of dueling in the arena, and so he and Hult are sent to fight a horax, and begin to lose soon after.

Shedara, Eldako, and the elves of Armach-nesti manage to sneak into Kristophan, rescue Forlo and Hult, and escape. Forlo kills Rekhaz in cold blood on the streets of Armach-nesti. The elves of Armach-nesti gives Hult a magical pendant of language, so that he can understand what other people are saying. Now reunited, they head north to the snowy fields of Panak, where they search for the Wyrm-Namer, a dragon that can name other dragons.

They arrive in Panak on a magical elven boat, and quickly meet the Wolf-clan, a friendly clan that Eldako has lived with before. On their way to the clan village, they are beset by a snow storm, and pursued by the Eyes, which are almost invulnerable evil creatures that kill any that venture into the snow storms. However, they can be held at bay by statues of the Patient Folk. They arrive at the Wolf-clan's village, and meet the seer, Tulukaruk. Tulukaruk lets a spirit-wolf take control of his body to communicate with them. They learn that the spirit-wolf will only tell them where and how to find the Wyrm-Namer only if they will agree to kill it when they're done. Forced with no choice, they agree. Angusuk, the lead hunter of the tribe leads them to the mountain of the Wyrm-Namer, where Hult uses his magical pendant to communicate with the snow-ogres that guard his lair.

They entire the Namer's lair, and discover that he's dying. Before he dies, he manages to tell them the name of the dragon, Gloomwing, who lives in the valleys of Marak, home of the kender. They head back to the village and discover that the shadow-fiends had massacred everyone there, and toppled the statues of the Patient Folk. They notice that some hunters may have escaped, so Angusuk decides to stay and look for the rest of his tribe. Shedara, Hult, Eldako, and Forlo head for Marak.

Essana and the Keeper attempt to escape through a tunnel, and Essana begins to miscarriage in the tunnel. They manage to exit the tunnel and get to the rendezvous point with the elves, although they are ambushed. Essana faints, and when she wakes up she discovers that she is chained. The Master shows her what happened to the Keeper, he's mutilated, and is being kept alive by a magic spell.

Meanwhile, the four arrive in Marak, and discover that Gloomwing left, though the kender are nearing extinction because the shadow-fiends capture kender, and take them to the Teacher, who arrives when the black moon is full to turn them into more shadow-fiends. Luckily (or unluckily), the black moon was full that night, so they attempt to ambush the Teacher. They capture him, and question him. After that, they desire revenge, so they kill him.

After that, they sail to Neron, and as soon as they arrive, Gloomwing decides to "meet" them. The four notice that the elves were gathering in the woods preparing to ambush Gloomwing, so Eldako decides to be a "dummy" for Gloomwing. Gloomwing dives at Eldako and breathes acid at him, and at the last second Eldako falls into the water. The elves meanwhile kill Gloomwing. They search for Eldako until it is dark, and are forced to leave and head for the elven village because mind flayers patrol the woods after dark. They meet the oldest elf in the village, the Grandmother. Grandmother tells them that a prophecy foretold that two humans and two elves would destroy the Brethren. She notices that they are missing Eldako, so she scries for him. They find out that the mind flayers captured Eldako, and that he was badly hurt by the dragon's acid. Eldako's right eye was gone, and his vision in his left eye is cloudy. His skin was melted by the acid, and his right leg was the only part of him untouched by the acid. They rescue him, and they assault the temple of Maladar. They manage to kill the Brethren, and Eldako manages to kill the Master by jumping to his death with the Master. They rescue Essana and Azar, Essana's son, who is already eighteen due to age altering magic. However, instead of Maladar taking over Azar, he accidentally manages to take control of Forlo, and he escapes to the Burning Sea where he will try to resurrect Aurim.

== Characters ==
- Shedara - A moon elf thief, who is helping Forlo.
- Barreth Forlo - Forlo is searching for his wife, Essana.
- Hult - Hult is a barbarian of the White Sky tribe, who now follows Barreth.
- Essana - Essana is Forlo's wife, who has been captured by evil forces intent on resurrecting Maladar.
- Eldako - Eldako is a wild elf, who is helping Forlo. Also gets into a relationship with Shedara.

== See also ==
- Blades of the Tiger
- Taladas
