= Chris Pierson =

American novelist

Chris Pierson is an American computer game designer as well as an author of several books in the Dragonlance saga. He has written many books for the series.

== Career ==
Chris Pierson was born in Canada.

Chris first wanted to write novels for the Dragonlance saga at the age of 12, which is when he first picked up a copy of a Dragonlance book. He finished his first novel at 16, which he describes as dreadful. He received his big break when Margaret Weis (one of the most prestigious authors in the Dragonlance series) sent out an open call for submissions to an online site. The submissions, if accepted, would be used in an anthology of sorts. Chris had his first story accepted.

At the 1997 Gen Con game fair, TSR approached him about writing books for the Dragonlance series. He wrote the Kingpriest Trilogy and the Taladas Trilogy. His other Dragonlance novels are the Bridges of Time novels Spirit of the Wind and Dezra's Quest.

Pierson's short fiction has appeared in the anthologies Time Twisters, Pandora's Closet, Fellowship Fantastic, The Dimension Next Door, and Terribly Twisted Tales.

As a computer game designer, Chris Pierson worked at Turbine and later its successor Standing Stone Games. He was one of four systems designers for the early MMORPG fantasy game Asheron's Call. Pierson worked on The Lord of the Rings Online for over 20 years as both writer and world designer. In his position as Lead Worldbuilder and Loremaster of the game, Pierson performs the original research of Tolkien's legendarium, comprising information from all available sources by J. R. R. Tolkien into a comprehensive timeline of historical background events for each of the game's regions, while also identifying the gaps where new stories can be told.

== Personal life ==
Pierson lives in Boston, Massachusetts with his wife Rebekah and their children.

== Dragonlance novels ==
=== Bridges of Time series ===
- Spirit of the Wind
- Dezra's Quest

=== The Kingpriest Trilogy ===
- Chosen of the Gods
- Divine Hammer
- Sacred Fire

=== The Taladas Trilogy ===
- Blades of the Tiger
- Trail of the Black Wyrm
- Shadow of the Flame
