= Blades of the Tiger =

2005 novel by Chris Pierson

- Blades of the Tiger book cover
- Author: Chris Pierson
- Cover artist: Matt Stawicki
- Language: English
- Series: Taladas Chronicles, Dragonlance
- Genre: Fantasy novel
- Publisher: Wizards of the Coast
- Publication date: April, 2005 (mass market paperback)
- Publication place: United States
- Media type: Print (Paperback)
- Pages: 416 pp
- ISBN: 0-7869-3569-3
- OCLC: 58835112
- LC Class: CPB Box no. 2388 vol. 6
- Followed by: Trail of the Black Wyrm

Blades of the Tiger is a fantasy novel set in the Dragonlance setting, based on the Dungeons & Dragons fantasy role-playing game. This is the first of a trilogy about Taladas; the second book in the trilogy is Trail of the Black Wyrm. Blades of the Tiger was published in 2005.

== Plot introduction ==
Blades of the Tiger is set in Taladas shortly after the War of Souls, and is generally located in the Imperial League.

== Plot summary ==
While attempting to steal back an important work of art, Shedara discovers that the lord of the keep has been attacked and is dying. He mistakes her for a friend and mutters "The Hooded One" before he dies from his mortal but bloodless wounds. After returning to Armach-nesti and discussing the event with the Voice of the Stars, she is sent on another mission to retrieve the Hooded One, a statue of an evil Emperor of Aurim, Maladar the Faceless. Maladar's soul has been imprisoned in the statue and evil forces are at work to try to free him.

Meanwhile, across the Tiderun, on the plains north of Coldhope Keep, Hult has discovered that the Uigan leader, their Bolya, has been ambushed. Chovuk and Hult look for the Boyla, and discover that he is still alive. Chovuk kills the Boyla, to be named the next Boyla. Hult later discovers that Chovuk has been learning evil sorcery from a black robed mage, known only as the Teacher. Chovuk fights the other contestant for the position of Boyla, and wins because he used sorcery to shape change into steppe-tiger. The tribes have a superstition that the steppe-tiger is the avatar of their god, and so embrace Chovuk as the new Boyla. Chovuk recruits the goblins, as well as an elf, Eldako, from the wild elf tribes to help him attack the Imperial League. They burn, sack, and massacre the towns and villages of the Imperial League north of the Tiderun, while they wait for the moons to sink below the horizon, so that the Tiderun will become dry.

In the Imperial League south of the Tiderun, Forlo is returning from many long years of war, when he discovers that the capital has been damaged by an earthquake, and that the emperor and almost all of his immediate blood relatives are dead. He also finds out that the keeper of the peace is Duke Rekhaz. Forlo meets Duke Rekhaz, and Rekhaz wants Forlo to help command his army, so that Rekhaz can defeat any opponents vying for the throne. However, Forlo has a writ of dismissal from the now dead emperor, so he refuses to serve, which angers Rekhaz. Forlo returns home, to discover a pirate raiding in his waters, whom he had previously signed a treaty with. He discovers that the pirate raided the ship only because the ship was carrying artifacts that hadn't been taxed, and the owner of the ship was a rich merchant. In return for raiding the ship, the pirate gives Forlo a statue. After taking it home, he finds out that his wife is pregnant, and that they both feel the statue's menacing presence. He decides to have it moved into the family vaults under the keep.

Shedara discovers that the statue was stolen from a merchant, and that it has ended up in the hands of Barreth Forlo. She attempts to steal the statue, but is trapped and captured by Forlo's guards. Forlo questions her, but she refuses to answer and he has her locked up in a tower. He learns that the Uigan are preparing to cross the Tiderun, and attack his fief. He calls for aid from Rekhaz, but Rekhaz questions his loyalty. Rekhaz agrees to give Forlo only six hundred men if he agrees to rejoin the army. Forced to act, Forlo agrees. Later, Grath, a friend of Forlo's and the current commander of the Sixth Legion agrees to help Forlo. He decides to send the Sixth Legion to help Forlo, but they still can't hold the fief. He then questions Shedara again, and agrees to give her the statue if she will contact Armach-nesti to send aid. She contacts Armach-nesti, but discovers that the evil forces intent on capturing the statue have murdered the Voice of the Stars and all her people. Forlo tells her she's free to go, but she still wants to help him, so she forces Maladar to send a gigantic wave over the barbarian horde. The barbarian horde is destroyed, and she manages to force Maladar back into the statue.

A small remainder of the Uigan horde is still alive, as well as Eldako, the Boyla, and Hult. The horde doesn't present much resistance and are easily defeated by Forlo and his men, however, the elf escapes. The Boyla turns back into a human because the evil forces betrayed him, so he becomes mad. He fights Forlo in an attempt to regain his honor, but Forlo kills him. The Boyla's protector, Hult, decides not to avenge his master and instead follows Forlo. Forlo discovers that Grath was killed during the fighting and that the Uigan were sent as a diversion so that the keep would be unprotected. Forlo, Shedara, and Hult return to the keep only to discover that Essana has been kidnapped, the statue is missing and the only thing left behind is a dragon's scale.

== Characters ==
- Shedara - A moon elf thief, who works for the Voice of the Stars in Armach-nesti.
- Barreth Forlo - The commander of the sixth legion, of the Imperial League, as well as lord of Coldhope Keep.
- Hult - A Uigan and a member of the White Sky Tribe.
- Chovuk - The leader of the White Sky Tribe, as well as the Boyla, leader of all tribes.
- Essana - Forlo's wife.

== See also ==
- Taladas
