= Go to the Sugar Altar =

Studio album by The Kelley Deal 6000
- Released: June 4, 1996
- Length: 30:56
- Label: Nice Records
- Producer: Kelley Deal

The Kelley Deal 6000 chronology
| Go to the Sugar Altar (1996) | Boom! Boom! Boom! (1997) |

Professional ratings
Review scores
| Source | Rating |
|---|---|
| AllMusic | 3/5 stars |
| Entertainment Weekly | B+ |

Go to the Sugar Altar is the first album by The Kelley Deal 6000, released in 1996. It was released on Kelley Deal's own record label, Nice Records.

== Critical reception ==
The Washington Post wrote that the "album of pithy art-punk tunes soon dissipates into a series of cryptic musical sketches, but such opening songs as 'Canyon' and 'How About Hero' out-Pixie the Amps (Kim's latest band)."

Ian Watson, writing in Melody Maker, describe it as "one startling debut", noting that although "[it] may seem rather slap-dash and half-baked in places, [...], that's only to be expected given the circumstances. The follow-up will be amazing."

== Track listing ==
1. "Canyon" (Kelley Deal) – 3:10
2. "How About Hero" (Kelley Deal, Jesse Colin Roff) – 2:43
3. "Dammit" (Kelley Deal, Jesse Colin Roff) – 2:40
4. "Sugar" (Kelley Deal, Dave Shouse) – 4:17
5. "A Hundred Tires" (Kelley Deal) – 1:48
6. "Head of the Cult" (Kelley Deal) – 1:51
7. "Nice" (Kelley Deal, Jesse Colin Roff) – 3:31
8. "Trixie Delicious" (Kelley Deal, Jimmy Flemion, Dave Shouse, Jesse Colin Roff) – 3:12
9. "Marooned" (Kelley Deal) – 2:08
10. "Tick Tock" (Kelley Deal, Jimmy Flemion) – 2:00
11. "Mr. Goodnight" (Kelley Deal, Jesse Colin Roff) – 3:36

== Members ==
- Kelley Deal: Vocals, Guitar
- Nick Hook: Drums
- Marty Nedich: Bass
- Steve Salett: Guitar

Guest musicians

- Jimmy Flemion: Vocals, Guitar
- Jason Orris: Bass
- Jesse Colin Roff: Drums, Guitar, Trumpet, Castanets
- Dave Shouse: Bass, Guitar, Lap Steel, Hammond Organ
