= The Kelley Deal 6000 =

American alternative rock band

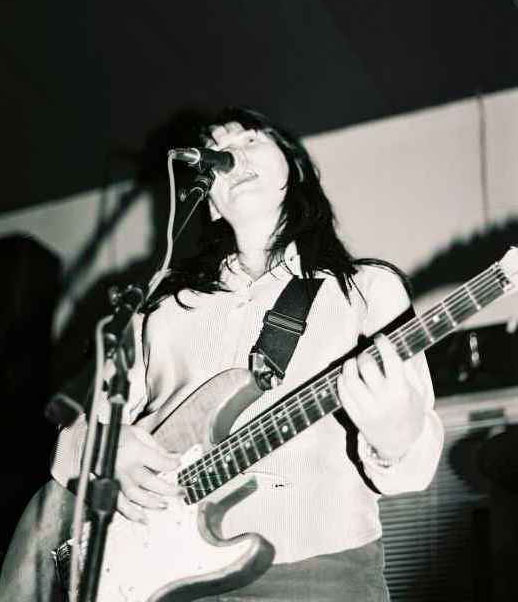
- Kelley Deal 6000 performance, circa late 1990s

Background information
- Origin: St. Paul, Minnesota, United States
- Genre: Alternative rock
- Years active: 1995–1997
- Label: Nice
- Past members: Kelley Deal; Marty Nedich; Steve Salett; Nick Hook; Todd Johnson; Todd Mund

The Kelley Deal 6000 was an alternative rock band formed in St. Paul, Minnesota and was active between 1995 and 1997. They were formed by Kelley Deal in 1995, while her main band The Breeders was on hiatus and after she had just completed a stint in rehab. The band released two albums in 1995 and 1997, before Kelley went back to rejoin The Breeders the following year.

== History ==
The band was formed in 1995 by Kelley Deal, lead guitarist of The Breeders, after she left drug rehab in St. Paul, Minnesota. The band's original line-up included Kelley on guitar and vocals, Marty Nedich on bass, Steve Salett on guitar, and Nick Hook on drums.

The band's first album, Go to the Sugar Altar, was funded by Deal and released on her own label, Nice Records. After the release, the band toured the US and Europe, changing their guitarist to Todd Mund during the tour.

In February 1997, the band worked on their second album, Boom! Boom! Boom!. For the new album Nick Hook was replaced by Todd Johnson. The album was released in August 1997.

After touring the album the band went on hiatus, with Deal becoming a full-time member of her sister's band The Breeders.

== Band members ==
Past Members

- Kelley Deal – lead vocals, guitar (1995–1997)
- Marty Nedich – bass (1995–1997)
- Nick Hook - drums (1995-1997)
- Todd Johnson - drums (1997)
- Jess Colin Roff - guitar (1995)
- Steve Salett - guitar (January 1996-July 1996)
- Jimmy Swan - guitar (August 1996)
- Todd Mund - guitar (September 1996-1997)

== Discography ==
- Go To The Sugar Altar (1996), Nice Records
- Boom! Boom! Boom! (1997)
