= Off You =

2002 single by the Breeders

Single by the Breeders

from the album Title TK
- B-side: "Little Fury", "The She"
- Released: March 26, 2002
- Recorded: 2001
- Studio: Electrical Audio (Chicago)
- Genre: Alternative rock
- Length: 4:56
- Label: 4AD
- Songwriter(s): Kim Deal
- Producer(s): Steve Albini

The Breeders singles chronology
"No Aloha" (1994)	"Off You" (2002)	"Huffer" (2002)

"Off You" is a song by the Breeders. It was the first single released from their 2002 album Title TK. It was released in March 2002 on 4AD.

== Track listing ==
All tracks are written by Kim Deal, except where noted

No.	Title	Writer(s)	Length
1.	"Off You"		4:56
2.	"Little Fury"	Kim Deal, Kelley Deal, Richard Presley, Mando Lopez, Jose Medeles	3:30
3.	"The She"		4:01
Total length:			12:27

== Charts ==
Chart (2002)	Peak position
Canadian Digital Songs	25
