= Sacred Fire (novel) =

2003 novel by Chris Pierson

- Cover of the first edition
- Author: Chris Pierson
- Language: English
- Genre: Fantasy novel
- Published: 2003
- Publication place: United States
- Media type: Print (Paperback)
- ISBN: 0-7869-3036-5

Sacred Fire is a fantasy novel by Chris Pierson, set in the world of Dragonlance, and based on the Dungeons & Dragons role-playing game. It is the third novel in the "Kingpriest" series. It was published in paperback in December 2003.

== Plot summary ==
Sacred Fire explores part of the history of the world of Krynn.
