= Title TK =

2002 alternative rock album by The Breeders

Studio album by the Breeders
- Released: May 10, 2002
- Recorded: 1999–2001
- Studio: Electrical Audio, Chicago: Grandmaster Recording Ltd., Hollywood
- Genre: Alternative rock
- Length: 37:55
- Label: 4AD, Elektra
- Producer: Steve Albini

The Breeders chronology
Live in Stockholm (1994)	Title TK (2002)	Mountain Battles (2008)

Singles from Title TK
- 1. "Off You" Released: March 26, 2002; 2. "Huffer" Released: April 30, 2002; 3. "Son of Three" Released: September 2, 2002

Title TK is the third studio album by American alternative rock band the Breeders, released on May 20 and 21, 2002, by 4AD in the United Kingdom and Elektra Records in the United States, and on May 10 by P-Vine Records in Japan. The album—whose name means "title to come" in journalistic shorthand—generated three singles: "Off You", "Huffer", and "Son of Three". Title TK reached the top 100 in France, Germany, the UK, and Australia, and number 130 in the US.

Following multiple changes in personnel after the release of Last Splash (1993), singer and songwriter Kim Deal was the only remaining constant member of the Breeders by 1996. The next year, she returned to the studio in an attempt to record a follow-up album, but her behavior—including drug use and demanding expectations—alienated many of the musicians and engineers with whom she worked.

In 1999, joined by her sister Kelley, Deal began recording sessions with engineer Steve Albini in Chicago. Fear members Mando Lopez and Richard Presley, and drummer Jose Medeles, joined the line-up. The group continued recording with Albini in 2001. Title TK was compiled from the output of these sessions and supplemented with two tracks recorded in Los Angeles with engineers Andrew Alekel and Mark Arnold. Of the twelve songs on the album, ten are credited solely to Kim Deal; the other two were written by all five band members.

Commentary on the album has included discussion of its minimal instrumentation and the interjection of unexpected sounds. Reviewers have described the lyrics on the songs as unconventional and dark, and noted the prominence of vocal harmonies between the Deal sisters. The reception of Title TK has been generally positive; appraisal has included commendation for Albini's contributions to the sound of the album, and for how the recordings isolate individual instruments.

== Background and initial recording attempts ==
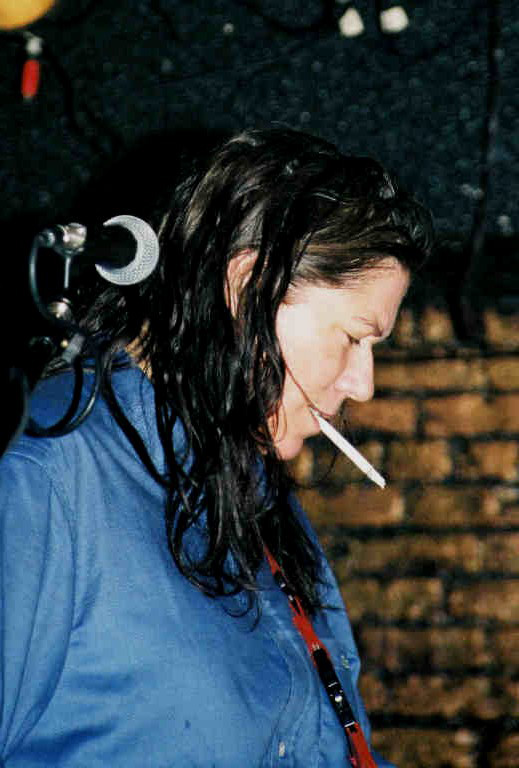
Kim Deal's initial attempts to record were hampered by her drug use and strained relationships with the recording personnel.

From the formation of the Breeders in 1989 until the mid-1990s, the line-up changed several times. Vocalist and songwriter Kim Deal was the band's sole consistent member. The line-up that recorded the group's debut Pod (released in 1990) included guitarist Tanya Donelly and drummer Britt Walford; they were replaced by Deal's sister Kelley and Jim Macpherson by the time the band's 1993 album Last Splash was recorded. Kelley Deal and original bassist Josephine Wiggs left in 1995. Kim Deal formed the Amps that year, but reformed the Breeders in 1996—initially using the Amps' line-up: Deal (vocals), Macpherson (drums), Luis Lerma (bass), and Nate Farley (guitar). (Note: Between 1989 and 1996, violinist Carrie Bradley was also sometimes in the Breeders (see Erlewine and Albini 2002).)

Throughout 1997, Deal attempted to record tracks for a forthcoming album. Engineers and musicians on the project found that Deal's behavior and demanding musical standards created a difficult working environment. Deal's actions and the unenjoyable atmosphere of the recording sessions at the time caused Macpherson and Farley to leave the group. Several other musicians recruited throughout the year left for similar reasons. The 1997 sessions cost hundreds of thousands of dollars through the use of four New York studios, the expense of moving equipment between them, and hotel costs.

Three recording engineers parted ways with Deal in 1997. The first engineer she hired—Mark Freegard, who had co-produced Last Splash—has remarked that Deal was "totally lost" and that after seven weeks in the studio, there were no usable recordings. Two subsequent engineers, John Agnello and Bryce Goggin, had each worked with Deal in 1995 on parts of the Amps' album Pacer. Agnello became increasingly frustrated with Deal's drug use and the difficulty of retaining musicians. When Deal disappeared for several days without notice, Agnello left the recording sessions. Goggin later said it would have been impossible to find anyone able to play at the standards Deal required. She was unsatisfied with a drumming performance (by the percussionist of the Flaming Lips) that Goggin thought was outstanding, so he "told her to go home and practice playing drums." Deal followed his advice, and returned to her home in Ohio to practice the instrument.

== Subsequent recording and coalescence of the group ==
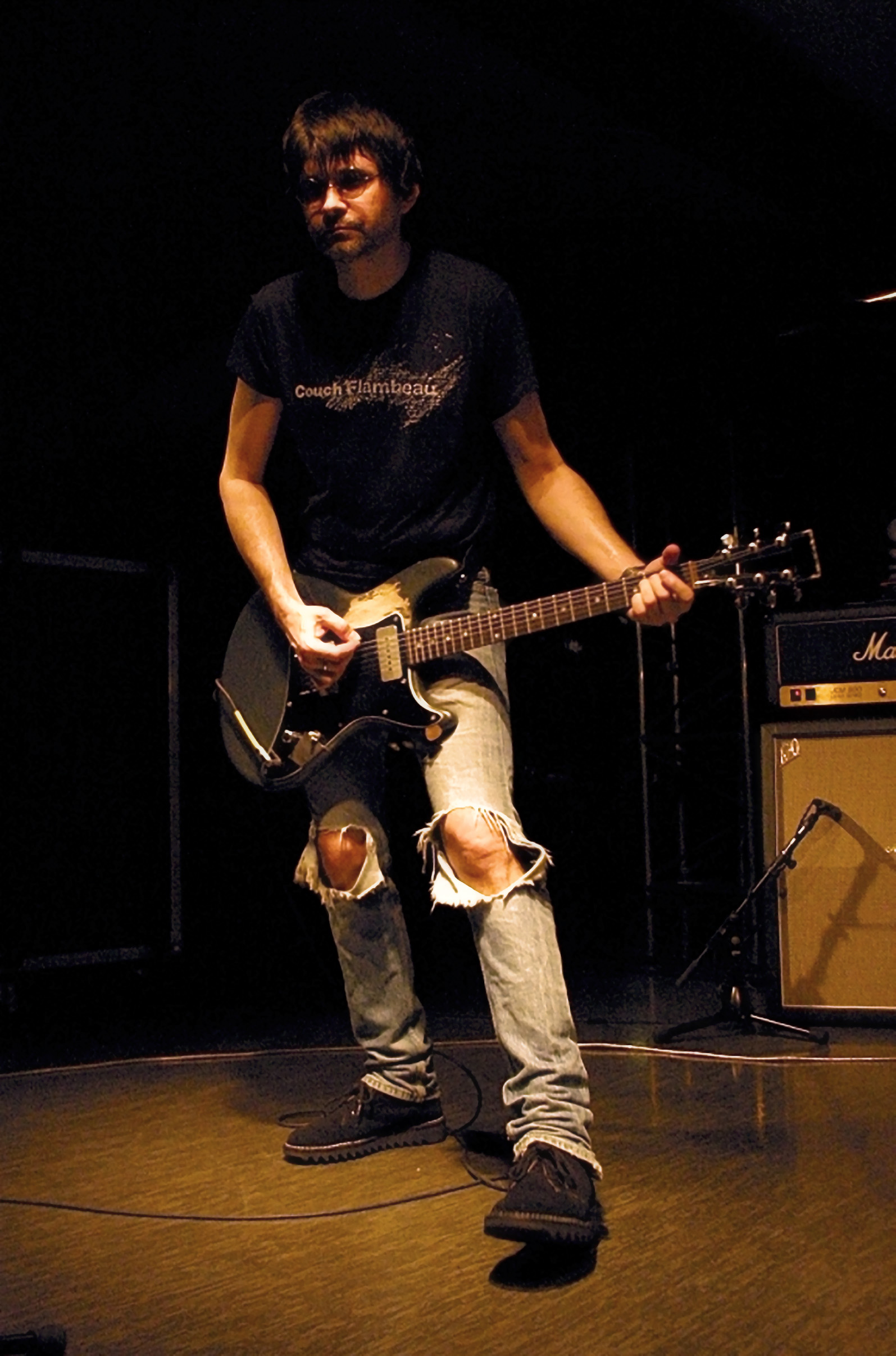
Steve Albini was the main sound engineer on Title TK.

Deal began recording again in 1999, first in Austin, Texas, and then at Electrical Audio studio in Chicago with Steve Albini, with whom she had previously worked on Pod, Pacer, and the Pixies' album Surfer Rosa. Although Deal performed most of the instruments herself at the 1999 sessions, her sister had some involvement. They recorded "The She", "Forced to Drive", and "Too Alive" in Chicago, with Deal's drum performance on the third track taken from the Texas session.

Deal was satisfied with the material recorded up to this point, but realized she would not be able to tour without a band. She returned to New York to look for a backing group in March 2000. After a chance meeting with members of Fear, she invited drummer Andrew Jaimez, bassist Mando Lopez, and guitarist Richard Presley to jam with her at the studio she was renting. Deal wanted to continue playing with these musicians, and so within three months she moved to Fear's hometown Los Angeles. Jaimez, Lopez, and Presley joined the Breeders, and Kelley Deal rejoined the group soon after. About a month after Kim Deal's arrival, Jose Medeles replaced Jaimez, who decided he did not have enough time for the Breeders because of his involvement in other musical projects. The new line-up spent the rest of the year writing and rehearsing.

The Breeders returned to Chicago in mid-2001 to continue recording with Albini. "Little Fury", "London Song", "Off You", "Put on a Side", "Full on Idle", "T and T", and "Huffer" were recorded in 2001. At some point from 2000 to 2002, the group spent time at the Grandmaster Recording Ltd. studio in Los Angeles. The session at Grandmaster Recording, engineered by Mark Arnold and Andrew Alekel, resulted in "Son of Three" and "Sinister Foxx". "Fire the Maid", a song from these sessions written and sung by Kelley Deal, was performed in concert in 2000 and 2001 but was not included on the album.

Kelley Deal has stated that "Little Fury" and "Sinister Foxx" started as "just ideas" by the sisters that turned into full collaborations by the group—all five musicians received songwriting credits on these tracks. Kim Deal is credited as sole songwriter on the remaining ten tracks, although other band members contributed musical ideas as well.

During the Title TK sessions, Kim Deal adopted a philosophy she calls "All Wave". This approach stipulates that only analog recording may be used, without computer editing. Deal has said that she likes "interesting mistakes" in song production, and that her beliefs about recording are "a reaction ... to everything sounding so straight and clean in most records today". (Note: In his accounts of the period, Albini described Deal's falling out with the engineers in 1997 as partly due to her disagreement with them over her "All Wave" ideals (Albini 2002, Kaye 2015). He characterized these engineers' "insistence" on using computer manipulation as having "marred" the recording sessions (Albini 2002). In these accounts, Albini was generally more sympathetic towards Deal than other sources about her culpability for the 1997 sessions' lack of success (Albini 2002, Kaye 2015). In particular, he described her situation of having no backing group in 1999 as the result of her previously "having [had] trouble finding people with mettle to play in a band" (Albini 2002). Albini named Title TK as an engineering project that was especially important to him personally—in its role in lifting Deal from a depressing period, and in establishing a close friendship between them (Kaye 2015).) The album's mastering was also done using analog processes, by Albini and Steve Rook, at Abbey Road Studios in London.

== Music and lyrics ==
"Off You"
The music on Title TK, including "Off You", contains unexpected sounds that are used only once, such as what one critic characterized as the "bizarre solitary synthesiser splodge" heard here. (Note: The sound—which Richard Presley has jokingly characterized as "some science fiction thing"—has been explained by Kim Deal as her sister's attempt to add bass pedals to the track: "It came out as so obviously not a noise that would go with the song, but it sounded cool" (Goodman 2002).)

A sparse, minimal style of instrumentation is used on Title TK. Throughout the album, the band makes use of unexpected or jarring musical ideas. One reviewer described the way "keyboards buzz from out of nowhere, guitars hit bum notes intentionally, basslines amble up and down the scale, sometimes two at a time." Another commentator described the progression of "Put on a Side" as follows: "At 1.28 there is a distorted chug. At 2.29 a drum-roll. Neither of these introduces anything, continues or reappears. They just pop up and then evaporate like accidental fireworks." Title TK has been noted on one hand for big contrasts in speed and levity from song to song, and on the other, for the unified feel of the entire album.

The unconventional character of Title TK's lyrics has been emphasized in reviews. Opinion has been divided on the intelligibility of the lyrics. Lines from "Son of Three" and "Little Fury" have been highlighted for their poetic qualities. Others have taken the album's words to be opaque with confusing imagery. Critics have noted both the dark tendencies and the humor of the lyrics. The Deal sisters' harmonies have been singled out for praise, and reviewers have described Kim's vocals as rough but also endearing.

=== Songs ===
Title TK begins with "Little Fury", named after a kind of pocketknife sold at truck stops with the word "fury" written along the side of the blade. On the call and response track, the Deal sisters sing over a heavy bassline, a funky drumbeat, and guitar sounds influenced by surf music and grunge. J.R. Moores wrote for Drowned in Sound that "Somebody considers unleashing a guitar solo, yet its notes are few and the vocals kick back in before it has the chance to go anywhere. Is it a solo or a riff? Whatever it is, it flicks its middle finger at other solos and riffs, exposing them as absurd, flamboyant, shallow fripperies. I'm not part of that club, it says." For PopMatters's Matt Cibula, the repeated line "Hold what you've got" is the Deals' reminder to themselves to keep the Breeders intact henceforth.

On "London Song", Jim Abbott at The Orlando Sentinel said the syncopated guitar performance complements Title TK's "world-weary attitude," just as the sisters' "tough lost years ... [are] obvious from Kim's disconnected delivery on songs about hard times". By contrast, NY Rock's Jeanne Fury noted the track's upbeat, quirky energy. In the Japanese release's liner notes, critic Mia Clarke described the slow ballad "Off You" as having a lackadaisical feel; Pitchfork Media's Will Bryant was struck by the song's creepy quality, and compared it to the mood of the Pink Floyd album The Wall. Rolling Stone's Arion Berger said "Off You" is "as direct and heartbreaking as an eighty-five-year-old blues recording, and Kim, her voice clear and full of hope, can't help sounding like a young woman who's lived ten awful lifetimes."

"The She", named after a nightclub that the Deals' brother used to visit, has been described as having a funky feel, with a start-and-stop rhythm of bass and drums. Bryant found the track's keyboard part reminiscent of Stereolab's music, while AllMusic's Heather Phares likened the entire song to Jefferson Airplane's "White Rabbit". Cibula mentioned that the "creepy/cool ... sound [fits] the characteristic Kim Deal familiar/strange lyrics: 'Sorrow blowin' through the vents / I'm over Houston / You're over the night we met.'" Kim Deal plays every instrument on "Too Alive" and both sisters sing. Moores noted the track's buoyant feel and the steady strumming style of Deal's guitar. To Phares, the song possesses an immediacy as though the listener were there watching the performance in person.

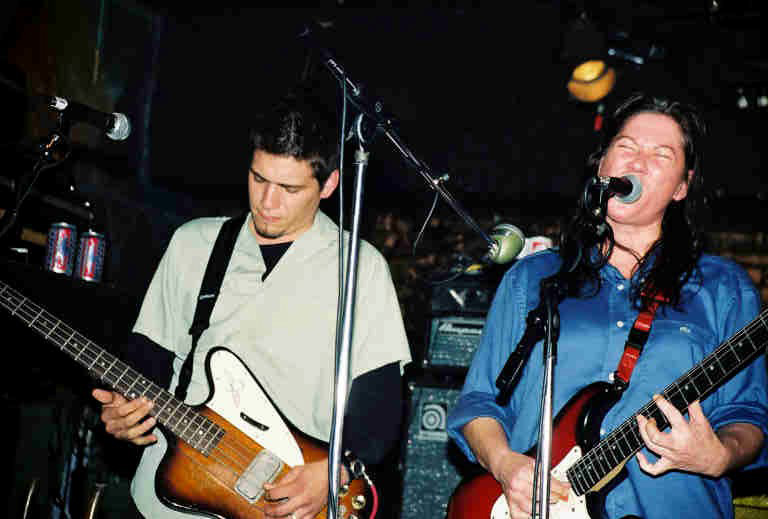
The bass part by Mando Lopez (pictured with Kim Deal in 2004) has been noted by some critics as an important element of "Put on a Side".

Bryant identified "Son of Three" as an example of "when the Breeders set out to rock", noting "the chugging guitars and stomping drums." The Breeders re-recorded "Son of Three" in July 2002 for its release as Title TK's third single; this version is faster than the album track, and reflects the speed they were playing the song in concert that year. The lyrics of both "Son of Three" and "The She" suggest extended road trips with unknown outcomes. The album's next song, "Put on a Side", has a distinctive bassline and a cramped, repressive feel. Berger wrote that Kim Deal's "voice grinds sweetly, weariedly, sloppily inside your brain," as she repeats twelve words over the course of the song: "Better I better I stayed up / Better mono, put on a side."

An earlier version of "Full on Idle", Title TK's eighth track, was released on the Amps' Pacer in 1995. In a 1997 interview, Deal expressed an interest in redoing multiple Amps songs, partially because she did not feel Pacer was well recorded. (Note: Another reason Deal gave was that "nobody's heard those songs anyway" (Ashare 1997), as Pacer had sold relatively poorly (Gettelman 1996). The New York Times's Ethan Smith reports that as of 2002, the album had sold 25,000 copies (Smith 2002).) Bryant opined that both versions of "Full on Idle" sound almost the same, but The Village Voice's Jessica Grose wrote that the Breeders' rendition is noticeably slower. In Cibula's view, this version contains elements of country music, cumbia, and ska. The Guardian's Betty Clarke cited the line "Obey your colorist, bleach it all away" as an example of Title TK's amusing, off-center lyrics. On "Sinister Foxx", Deal repeatedly sings "Has anyone seen the iguana?" She has explained this as being a reference to buying marijuana: "Have you ever bought a bag of weed? You walk in, and the pot dealer's got an empty terrarium ... Every time I go to a pot dealer's house, there's no iguana." Another line, "I'm in beer class every Thursday night", refers to the alcohol awareness classes that Richard Presley attended after being caught driving while drunk. Phares described the song as having a "sexy menace", and Berger compared the drum part to gunshots and door-knocking.

Moores identified in "Forced to Drive" the "quiet-LOUD-quiet" dynamic for which Deal's former band, the Pixies, are famous. Berger noticed a similar contrast between the song's "pop verses" and "the gloom of a twisty, malignant chorus". For Abbott, this four-chord chorus "approaches exuberance" in its mixture of catchy melody and grunge. The penultimate track, "T and T", was described by Bryant as an instrumental introduction leading into "Huffer". Kelley Deal has stated that these two songs share a thematic union: the latter is about the negative side of inhaling paint or other substances, while the former stands for "Toil and Trouble", also about the hardships that inhaling chemicals can cause. "Huffer" is, according to Moores, a lively, poppy track, and critics have commented on its "da-da-da" and "ah-ah" chorus.

== Release and reception ==
Professional ratings
Aggregate scores
Source	Rating
Metacritic	71/100
Review scores
Source	Rating
AllMusic	4/5 stars
The Encyclopedia of Popular Music	3/5 stars
Entertainment Weekly	B−
The Guardian	4/5 stars
NME	8/10
Pitchfork Media	7.4/10
Rolling Stone	3.5/5 stars
The Rolling Stone Album Guide	2/5 stars
Spin	3/5 stars
The Village Voice	A−

Title TK was released on May 20 and 21, 2002, on the labels 4AD (United Kingdom), Elektra Records (United States), V2 Records (Belgium), and Virgin Records (France); in Japan it came out on May 10 through P-Vine Records. The phrase "Title TK" means "title to come" in journalistic shorthand. (Note: Deal had previously considered using Title TK as the name of the Breeders' second album, before deciding on Last Splash (Goodman 2002).) The album cover was designed by Vaughan Oliver and Chris Bigg, with additional photography in the packaging by Onie M. Montes; Oliver, who began doing artwork for 4AD in 1980, also designed Breeders' releases including Pod and Last Splash. Three singles were released from Title TK: "Off You", "Huffer", and "Son of Three"; "Off You" reached number 25 on the Canadian Digital Songs chart, and "Son of Three" number 72 on the UK Singles Chart. Title TK reached the top 100 in the United Kingdom, Australia, France, and Germany. It peaked at number 130 in the United States, where as of June 2004, there were 45,000 units sold.

Most critics responded positively to the album. Critical aggregator Metacritic gave Title TK a score of 71, indicating that the compiled reviews—from 19 critics total—were on the whole favorable. Betty Clarke of The Guardian wrote that Title TK is "a welcome return to punky pop that knows how to flex some melodic muscle", and singled out the isolation of different sounds as the best aspect of the album. Similarly, NME's John Robinson lauded the distinctive character of the drums, guitar, and vocals. Other positive commentary included praise for Albini's influence on the album's sound (PopMatters's Matt Cibula), and for the album's quirky appeal (Billboard critic Brian Garrity). In The Village Voice, Robert Christgau called the music "skeletal, fragmented, stumblebum", and applauded Kim and Kelley Deal's tuneful songwriting. While noting "they've been away so long they still think alt is a sloppy lifestyle rather than an embattled ethos", Christgau concluded that, "Through the imagistic baffle of their lyrics, they leave the impression that they subsist off their modest royalties, scattered gig fees, and compromised advances—mostly on beer."

More negatively, Melanie McFarland of The Seattle Times lamented the too frequent changes in tone from song to song, and considered the album a step backwards from Last Splash. Spin's Steve Kandell characterized Title TK as "a little unsure of itself", and pointed to the Breeders' re-recording of "Full on Idle" as evidence that "the creative coffers weren't exactly spilling over" for Deal.

== Track listing ==
All tracks are written by Kim Deal, except where noted.

No.	Title	Writer(s)	Length
1.	"Little Fury"	Kim Deal; Kelley Deal; Richard Presley; Mando Lopez; Jose Medeles	3:30
2.	"London Song"		3:39
3.	"Off You"		4:56
4.	"The She"		4:01
5.	"Too Alive"		2:46
6.	"Son of Three"		2:09
7.	"Put on a Side"		2:59
8.	"Full on Idle"		2:37
9.	"Sinister Foxx"	Kim Deal; Kelley Deal; Presley; Lopez; Medeles	4:16
10.	"Forced to Drive"		3:04
11.	"T and T"		1:57
12.	"Huffer"		2:09

Japanese release

The Japanese release contains the following bonus tracks: (Note: These demo songs were originally released in 1997 on the "Climbing the Sun" single, put out by the Breeders' fan magazine, Breeder's Digest. They were recorded by engineer Erika Noise and assistant Nelsha Moorji at New York's Loho Studios in July 1996 ("Climbing the Sun" 7" single cover). The tracks were also included on the "Huffer" single in 2002 (The Breeders: Huffer).)

No.	Title	Length
13.	"Forced to Drive" (Loho Version)	3:15
14.	"Climbing the Sun"	3:58

== Personnel ==
The following personnel were involved in making Title TK:

=== Musicians ===
- Kim Deal – guitar, organ, drums, bass, vocals
- Kelley Deal – guitar, bass, vocals
- Richard Presley – guitar
- Mando Lopez – bass, guitar
- Jose Medeles – drums
- John McEntire – drum roll on "The She" (Note: In the album's liner notes, this drum roll is credited to the "1987 Oregon State rudimentary snare drum champion" (Title TK liner notes (Japan)). Cibula asserts that this refers to McEntire (Cibula 2002).)

=== Production ===
- Steve Albini – engineering, mastering
- Mark Arnold – engineering
- Andrew Alekel – engineering
- Steve Rook – mastering

=== Art design ===
- Vaughan Oliver – art design
- Chris Bigg – art design
- Onie M. Montes – additional photography

== Charts ==
Chart (2002)	Peak position
Australian Albums (ARIA)	42
French Albums (SNEP)	91
German Albums (GfK Entertainment)	91
UK Albums (Official Charts Company)	51
US Billboard 200	130
