= All Nerve =

Studio album by the Breeders
- Released: March 2, 2018
- Studios: Candyland, Dayton, Kentucky; Electrical Audio, Chicago; Fernwood, Dayton, Ohio
- Genre: Alternative rock
- Length: 33:51
- Label: 4AD

The Breeders chronology
Fate to Fatal (2009)	All Nerve (2018)

Singles from All Nerve
- 1. "Wait in the Car" Released: October 3, 2017; 2. "All Nerve" Released: January 9, 2018

All Nerve is the fifth studio album by American alternative rock band the Breeders, released on March 2, 2018, 10 years after their previous album Mountain Battles. A Stereogum article in June 2016 reported that the band was recording new material at their Ohio studio and in October 2017 they released the first single from the album titled "Wait in the Car". 4AD announced on January 9, 2018, that the new album would be made available on March 2, 2018, and released the album's second single, All Nerve on the same day. The album also marks the band's first in 25 years with their Last Splash lineup. Courtney Barnett guests on one song on the album; "Howl at the Summit".

== Background ==
"Wait in the Car"
The album's lead single "Wait in the Car" was favorably compared by some critics to their Last Splash single "Cannonball"

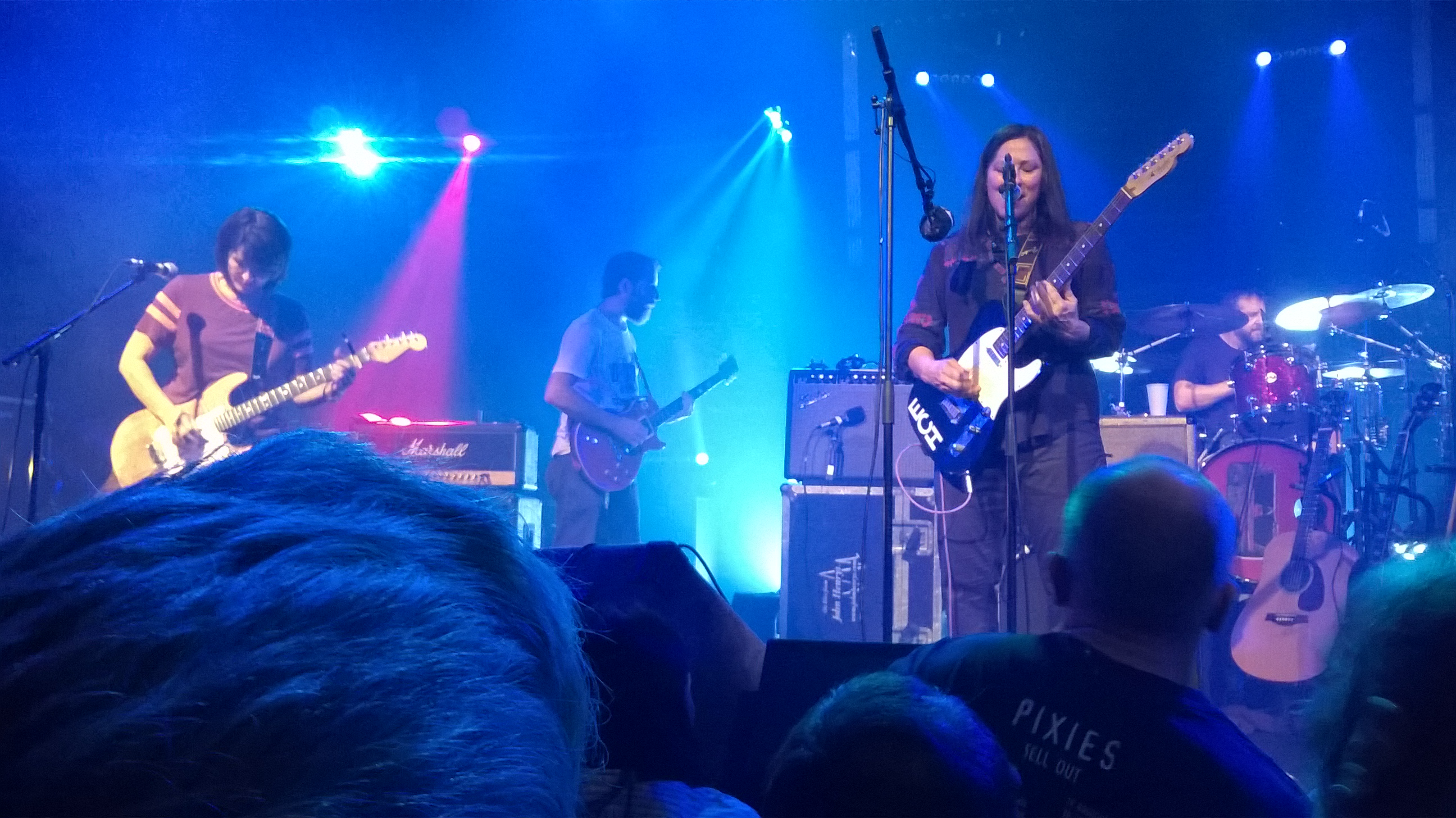
The Breeders performing in Paris, France in 2017.

In 2012 Kim and Kelley Deal decided to commemorate the upcoming 20-year anniversary of the Breeders' 1993 album Last Splash by touring in 2013 with the albums original recording personnel and made contact with Josephine Wiggs and Jim MacPherson. At this time Kim and MacPherson had not spoken since their acrimonious split during their time together in the Amps, however both he and Wiggs were interested and their record label, 4AD decided to release a deluxe 20th anniversary version of the album titled LSXX. The tour began in the US, continued in Europe, Australia, and South America, and included the Deerhunter-curated All Tomorrow's Parties festival. A teaser video was made by the band showing the reunited lineup in rehearsal. Reflecting on these rehearsals Kim said of the experience "It feels really natural, but at the same time there is adjustment. Like when Jim set up his drums and I started playing with him, I had to turn around and crank my amplifier up like two numbers. He's pretty loud." At the conclusion of the LSXX tour the band realized how well they were all getting along and decided to record new music together. While recording at Candyland Recording Studio in Dayton, KY with engineer Mike Montgomery, Courtney Barnett, who was in town for the Nelsonville Music Festival, recorded some backup vocals for "Howl at the Summit". For the duration of the recording process, Wiggs stayed in Kim Deal's attic at her Dayton, Ohio home to avoid having to drive the 10 hour journey to New York.

== Reception ==
Professional ratings
Aggregate scores
Source	Rating
AnyDecentMusic?	7.8/10
Metacritic	84/100
Review scores
Source	Rating
AllMusic	4/5 stars
The A.V. Club	B+
The Guardian	4/5 stars
The Independent	4/5 stars
Mojo	4/5 stars
Pitchfork	7.1/10
Q	4/5 stars
Record Collector	5/5 stars
Rolling Stone	4/5 stars
Uncut	9/10

All Nerve was released to universal acclaim, scoring 84 on aggregate website Metacritic, based on 31 reviews. AllMusic reviewer Heather Phares praised the album as "one of the band's finest blends of sugar and swagger, space and noise." Record Collector's Alun Hamnett praised Kim Deal's decision to leave the Pixies in 2013 to focus exclusively on the Breeders, stating, "They took their sweet time, but that Breeders line-up is back, and has just nonchalantly knocked it out of the park." The Guardian's Alexis Petridis said the album "blends ancient monuments and crushed beetles into a spectral brew". In a slightly more negative review, Julian Marszalek of The Quietus criticized the latter half of the album, writing that "the album goes through a variety of fits and starts before descending into anticlimax. 'Skinhead #2' and 'Blues at the Acropolis' are inconclusive filler, which on an album that lasts a little over 30 minutes, just isn’t good enough."

Mojo ranked the album number 10 on their list of "Top 75 Albums of 2018" in their end-of-the-year November 2018 issue.

== Track listing ==
All tracks are written by Kim Deal, except where noted.

No.	Title	Writer(s)	Length
1.	"Nervous Mary"		2:29
2.	"Wait in the Car"	Kim Deal; Richard Presley	2:04
3.	"All Nerve"		2:11
4.	"MetaGoth"	Deal; Josephine Wiggs	3:08
5.	"Spacewoman"	Deal; Morgan Nagler	4:21
6.	"Walking with a Killer"		3:45
7.	"Howl at the Summit"		2:57
8.	"Archangel's Thunderbird" (Amon Düül II cover)	Falk Ulrich Rogner; John Weinzierl	3:25
9.	"Dawn: Making an Effort"		3:50
10.	"Skinhead #2"	Deal; Wiggs	2:45
11.	"Blues at the Acropolis"		2:56

Japanese edition bonus tracks
No.	Title	Writer(s)	Length
12.	"Joanne" (Mike Nesmith cover)	Mike Nesmith	3:13
13.	"Gates of Steel" (Devo cover)	G. Casale, M. Mothersbaugh, Sue Schmidt, Debbie Smith	3:27

== Personnel ==
The Breeders

- Kim Deal – lead vocals, guitar, bass, keyboards
- Kelley Deal – guitar, vocals
- Jim MacPherson – drums
- Josephine Wiggs – bass, guitar, vocals

Additional personnel

- Courtney Barnett, Bones Sloane, Dave Mudie, Dylan Ranson-Hughes – backing vocals ("Howl at the Summit")
- Kyle Rector – Farfisa organ ("Dawn: Making an Effort")

Technical personnel

- Steve Albini – engineering, mixing
- Mike Montgomery, Greg Norman, Tom Rastikis – engineering
- Matt Boynton – mixing
- Eric Gorman – mixing assistance
- Greg Calbi, Bob Weston – mastering
- Martin Andersen – photography
- Chris Bigg – design

== Charts ==
Chart (2018)	Peak position
Australian Albums (ARIA)	44
Austrian Albums (Ö3 Austria)	48
Belgian Albums (Ultratop Flanders)	28
Belgian Albums (Ultratop Wallonia)	70
Dutch Albums (Album Top 100)	79
French Albums (SNEP)	98
German Albums (Offizielle Top 100)	83
Irish Albums (Official Charts)	49
New Zealand Heatseeker Albums (RMNZ)	5
Portuguese Albums (AFP)	17
Scottish Albums (Official Charts)	6
Spanish Albums (Promusicae)	74
Swiss Albums (Schweizer Hitparade)	60
UK Albums (Official Charts)	9
US Billboard 200	79

== Accolades ==
Publication	Accolade	Rank	Ref.
Fopp	Top 100 Albums of 2018	12	
Mojo	Top 75 Albums of 2018	10	
MusicOMH	Top 50 Album of 2018	44	
Uncut	Top 75 Albums of 2018	18	
Vulture	Top 15 Albums of 2018	15	
