= Kelley Deal =

American musician and singer (born 1961)

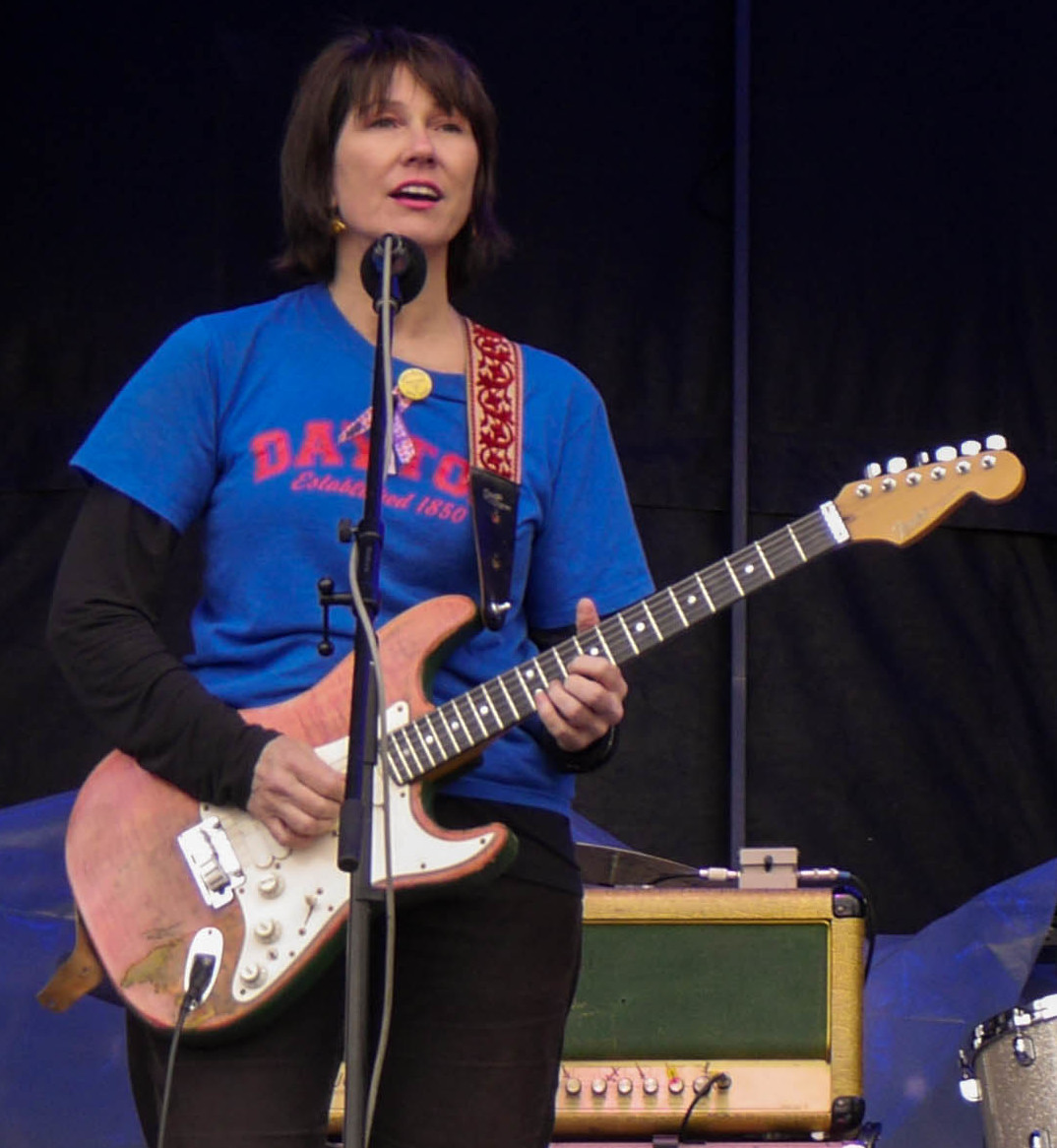
- Deal in 2018
- Born: June 10, 1961 (age 65); Dayton, Ohio, US
- Occupations: Musician; singer; songwriter
- Years active: 1992–present
- Relatives: Kim Deal (twin sister)
- Musical career
- Genre: Alternative rock
- Instruments: Vocals; guitar; bass; drums; keyboards
- Labels: 4AD; Nice Records
- Member of: The Breeders; R. Ring; Protomartyr
- Formerly of: The Kelley Deal 6000; The Last Hard Men; The Amps
- Website: https://www.kelleydeal.com/

Kelley Deal (born June 10, 1961) is an American musician and singer. She has been the lead guitarist and co-vocalist of the alternative rock band the Breeders since 1992, and has formed projects with bands such as R. Ring and the Kelley Deal 6000. She is the identical twin sister of the musician Kim Deal, who is also a member of the Breeders. In 2020, Deal joined the post-punk band Protomartyr as a touring member.

== Early life ==
Kelley Deal was born in Dayton, Ohio, 11 minutes before her identical twin sister, Kim Deal. The sisters grew up in Huber Heights, a suburb of Dayton, and graduated from Wayne High School. They first played together in their late teens, with Kim playing guitar and both singing Hank Williams songs in biker bars.

In 1986, Kim joined the Pixies in Boston. She paid for Kelley to fly to Boston and audition as drummer. Though the Pixies songwriter, Black Francis, approved, Kelley was not confident in her drumming and was more interested in playing songs written by Kim. Kelley worked as a defence contractor at an Air Force base.

== Career ==
=== The Breeders ===
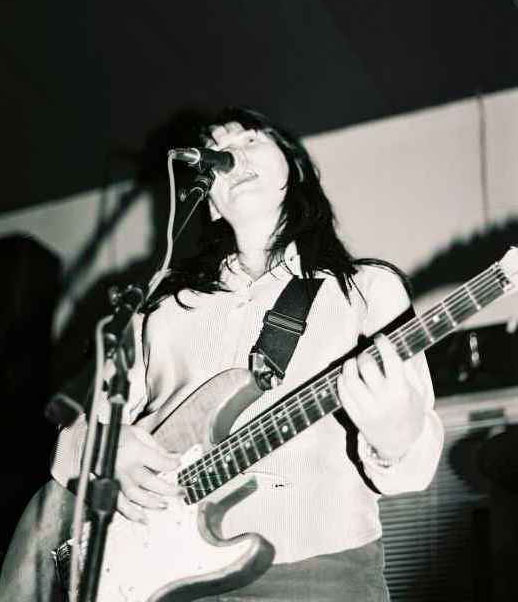
Deal performing with the Kelley Deal 6000

Deal and Tanya Donelly (of Throwing Muses) formed the Breeders in 1989, the name taken from Kim and Kelley Deal's pre-Pixies folk band. Kelley joined in 1992, debuting on vocals and rhythm guitar on their second recording, the EP Safari. After Donelly left to form Belly, Kelley was promoted to lead guitar for Last Splash (1993). The band supported the release by touring as Nirvana's opening act and performing at Lollapalooza 1994. Following a two-year hiatus, Kelley rejoined Kim in 1998 to record new demos for the Breeders. They released Title TK in 2002, Mountain Battles in 2008, and All Nerve in 2018.

=== Other projects ===
After Last Splash, Deal formed The Kelley Deal 6000 and founded the now-defunct Nice Records label. The band released two albums on Nice, Go To The Sugar Altar (1996) and Boom! Boom! Boom! (1997). Both the band and the label went on indefinite hiatus when Deal rejoined the Breeders in 1998.

In 1996, Deal joined Skid Row singer Sebastian Bach, Smashing Pumpkins drummer Jimmy Chamberlin, and Jimmy Flemion of The Frogs to form The Last Hard Men. Nice Records released a limited pressing of the supergroup's eponymous album, on which Deal shared lead vocals, guitar, bass, and songwriting duties. Bach and Spitfire Records issued an extended version of the album with a wider release in 2001.

In 2000, Deal recorded a cover of Pantera's "Fucking Hostile", which was released that year as part of the benefit compilation Free the West Memphis Three.

Deal has been lead singer and co-songwriter in the band R. Ring with Mike Montgomery since 2011. R. Ring has released seven singles/EPs and two full-length albums, Ignite the Rest and War Poems (2017) and We Rested (2023).

In January 2020, Deal joined the band Protomartyr in a touring capacity on guitar, keyboards, and backing vocals after collaborating with the band on their 2018 EP, Consolation.

=== Textiles ===
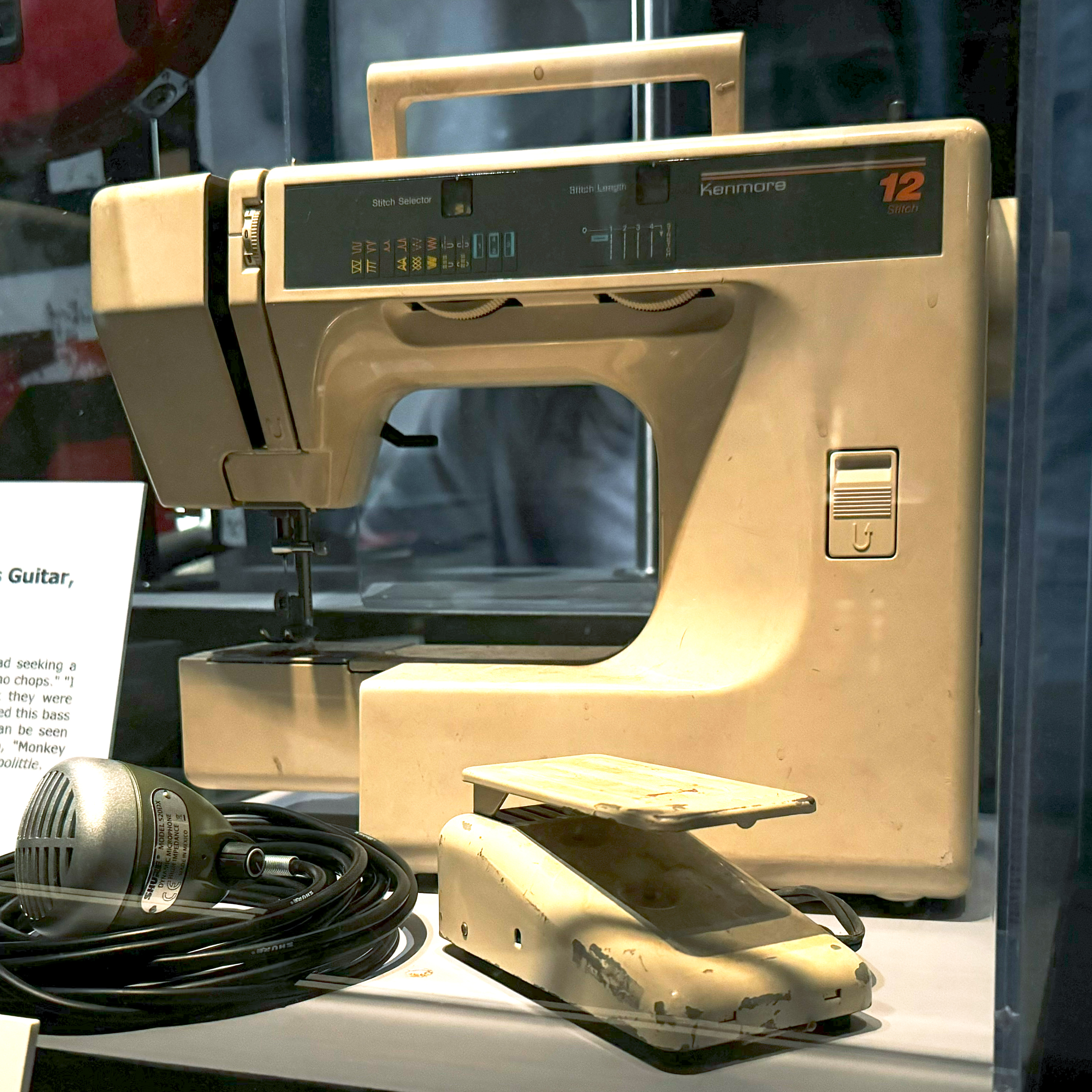
Deal's sewing machine, a Kenmore 385 12-stich, on display at the Rock and Roll Hall of Fame. Used in the Breeders song "S.O.S." from Last Splash.

Deal has a lifelong interest in textile arts. She brought her sewing machine to the studio while recording Last Splash so she could quilt during downtime. Its amplified sounds were used in the album, on the song "S.O.S.". The machine is on display at the Rock and Roll Hall of Fame. As of 2026, she sells scarves sewn from recycled textiles on her website.

Deal is also a knitter, specializing in knit handbags. Her handbag patterns are available in her 2008 book Bags That Rock: Knitting on the Road with Kelley Deal as well as on her personal Ravelry account. She has been featured on the appeared on the DIY Network knitting show Knitty Gritty, and one of her patterns is included in the DIY Network's book Knitty Gritty Knits: 25 Fun & Fabulous Projects.

== Personal life ==
In 1994, Deal was arrested for heroin possession. She had been using heroin since she was a teenager. She went through drug rehabilitation throughout the following year. In a February 2018 feature article, The New York Times reported that Deal was in her eighth year of sobriety.

== Discography ==
=== The Breeders ===
- Safari (EP, 1992)
- Last Splash (1993)
- Live in Stockholm 1994 (1994)
- Head to Toe (EP, 1994)
- Title TK (2002)
- Mountain Battles (2008)
- Fate to Fatal (EP, 2009)
- All Nerve (2018)

=== The Kelley Deal 6000 ===
- Go to the Sugar Altar (1996)
- Boom! Boom! Boom! (1997)

=== The Last Hard Men ===
- The Last Hard Men (1998/2001)

=== R. Ring ===
- "Fallout & Fire" b/w "SEE" (2012)
- The Rise EP (2013)
- Ignite The Rest (2017)
- War Poems, We Rested (2023)

== Bibliography ==
- Deal, Kelley (2008). Bags That Rock: Knitting on the Road with Kelley Deal. Sterling. ISBN 978-1-60059-158-7.
