= José Medeles =

American drummer

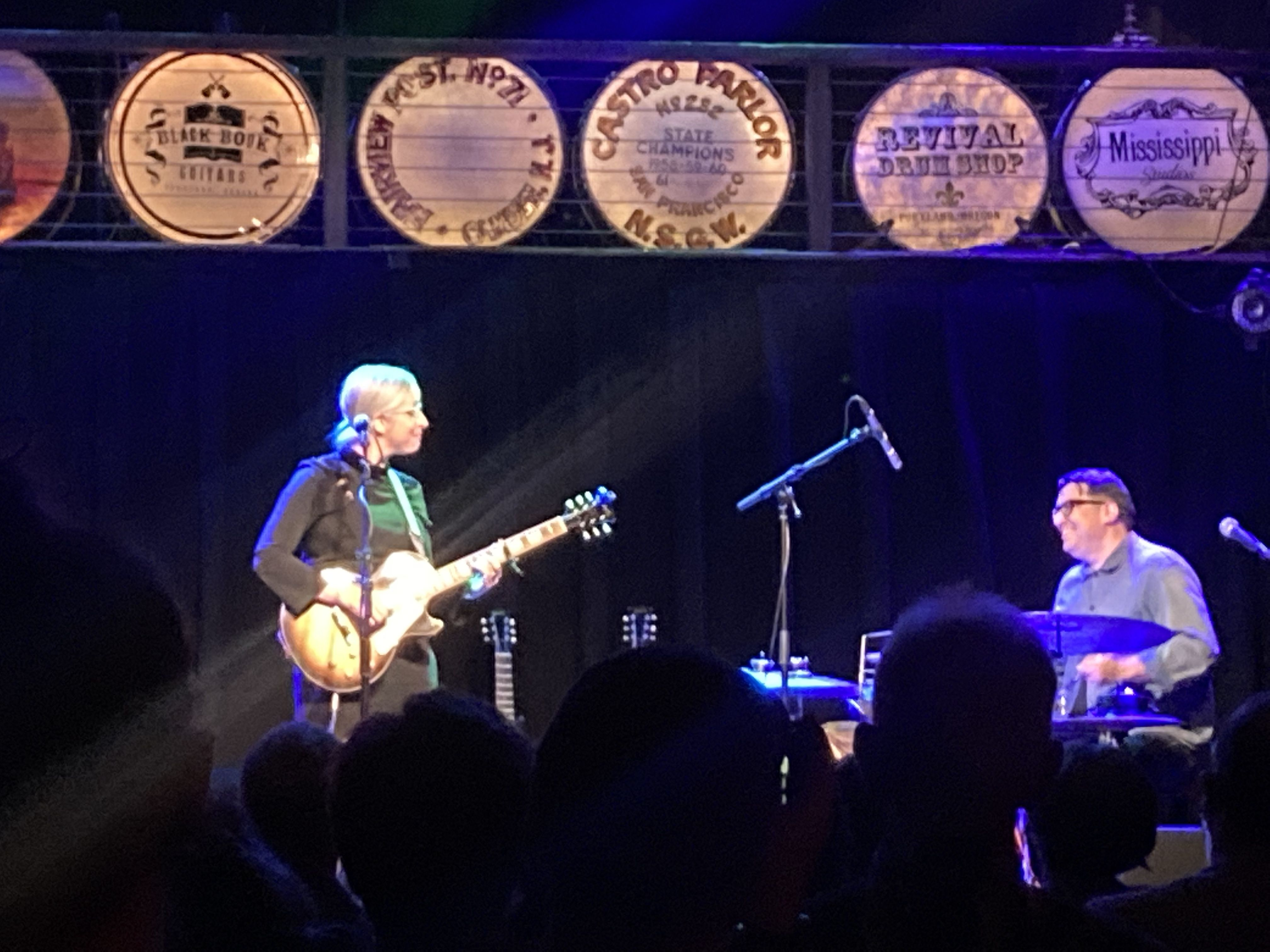
- José Medeles performing with Laura Veirs at Mississippi Studios

Background information
- Born: October 6, 1972 (age 52); La Salle, Illinois, U.S.
- Occupation: Musician
- Instrument: Drums

José Medeles is an American musician and author based in Portland, Oregon. Medeles opened Revival Drum Shop in 2009, a store dedicated to vintage and custom drums. He currently leads 1939 Ensemble, a drums, vibraphone, trumpet, guitar, and noise quartet. Medeles has played live and/or recorded with The Breeders, Kim Deal, Ben Harper, Donavon Frankenreiter, Joey Ramone, Modest Mouse, 22 Jacks, Mike Watt, Laura Veirs, Scout Nibblet, CJ Ramone, Face to Face, Rocco DeLuca, John Davis, Steve Soto, Holloys, Jackson United, Io Perry, Tito & Tarantula, Drunken Prayer, Dustbowl Holler (Tom Waits Tribute), Custom Made Scare, Los Infernos, and Crank Williams.

== Discography ==
=== Albums ===
- Random Underdog Stories (2002)
- Solo Drum: Tale of a Dysfunctional Drummer (2006)
- Art of Slowness: The Halfling Session (2018)
- Railroad Cadences & Melancholic Anthems (2022)
- Another Glory (2024)

== Bibliography ==
- The Stoic Drummer (2019)
- A Drummers Ethos (2022)
- Who Will Play My Drums When I'm Gone? (2022)
