= Hamburger (album) =

Compilation album by The Muffs
- Released: 2000
- Recorded: 1991–1999
- Genre: Punk rock, Pop punk, Rock
- Length: 73:59
- Label: Sympathy for the Record Industry
- Producer: Waterbottle Jones, Bill Bartell, Phil Ek, Brian Kehew, Rob Cavallo, Dave Katznelson, Kim Shattuck, Steve Holroyd

The Muffs chronology
Alert Today, Alive Tomorrow (1999)	Hamburger (2000)	Really Really Happy (2004)

Professional ratings
Review scores
Source	Rating
Allmusic	4/5 stars

Hamburger is a compilation album by pop punk band, The Muffs released in 2000 by Sympathy for the Record Industry (SFTRI). It is a collection of singles, compilation appearances, outtakes, demos and covers spanning the band's entire career up to the time of its release.

The first three tracks make up some of The Muffs earliest material, recorded on a 4-track in 1991. "New Love" and "I Don't Like You" come from the band's first release, the New Love single, issued on Sympathy for the Record Industry. "Guilty" and "Right In The Eye" come from their second single released by Au Go Go Records. In 1992, The Muffs released "I Need You" b/w "Beat Your Heart Out" on the Sub Pop label. Courtney Love makes an appearance on the track "Love", rambling about a stolen dress.

The second appearance of "Right In The Eye" is an outtake from the 1993 self-titled first album sessions. The demo of "Everywhere I Go" presented here, was used for the cassette version of the album only. Several demos are also included from the sessions for 1995s Blonder and Blonder. "When I Was Down", "Sick Of You", "Become Undone", and "Goodnight Now" never made it to the album, but "I'm Confused" would be re-recorded for release. "Kids In America" originally appeared on the Clueless Motion Picture Soundtrack. "I'm A Dick" was released as a single on SFTRI in 1996, prior to the release of Happy Birthday To Me, where a new version would appear in 1997. "My Crazy Afternoon" would also be re-recorded for the album. C.C. DeVille makes a guest appearance on "Silly People" which would later be re-recorded for Alert Today, Alive Tomorrow. "Do The Robot" features lead vocals by original drummer Criss Crass.

== Track listing ==
No.	Title	Writer(s)	Length
1.	"Get Me Out of Here"	Kim Shattuck	3:32
2.	"You Can Cry If You Want" (originally performed by The Troggs)	Reg Presley	2:16
3.	"Brand New Chevy" (originally performed by The Devil Dogs)	Andy Gortler	2:46
4.	"New Love"	Shattuck	2:11
5.	"I Don't Like You"	Shattuck	2:00
6.	"Guilty"	Shattuck	2:09
7.	"Right in the Eye" (7" version)	Shattuck	2:17
8.	"I Need You" (7" version)	Shattuck/Ronnie Barnett	2:56
9.	"Beat Your Heart Out" (originally performed by The Zeros)	Robert Lopez	2:30
10.	"Love" (answering machine message left by Courtney Love)	Courtney Love	1:25
11.	"Rock & Roll Girl" (originally performed by The Beat)	Paul Collins	2:18
12.	"Right in the Eye"	Shattuck	2:23
13.	"Everywhere I Go" (Cassette version)	Shattuck	3:14
14.	"You Lie" (originally performed by The Pandoras)	Paula Pierce	2:13
15.	"Toilet Paper"	Shattuck	0:11
16.	"I'm Confused" (8-track demo)	Shattuck	3:10
17.	"When I Was Down" (8-track demo)	Shattuck	2:39
18.	"Sick of You" (8-track demo)	Shattuck	2:32
19.	"No Action" (originally performed by Elvis Costello)	Elvis Costello	1:54
20.	"Become Undone"	Shattuck	3:25
21.	"Goodnight Now"	Shattuck	2:23
22.	"Nothing for Me"	Shattuck	1:47
23.	"Kids in America" (originally performed by Kim Wilde)	Marty Wilde, Ricky Wilde	3:11
24.	"I'm a Dick" (7" version)	Shattuck	1:37
25.	"Pacer" (originally performed by The Amps)	Kim Deal	2:44
26.	"My Crazy Afternoon" (demo)	Shattuck	2:31
27.	"Silly People" (demo)	Shattuck	3:51
28.	"My Mind's Eye" (originally performed by Small Faces)	Steve Marriott/Ronnie Lane	1:58
29.	"Happening"	Shattuck	0:57
30.	"Do the Robot" (originally performed by The Saints)	Chris Bailey	4:48
Total length:			73:59

== Album information ==
- "Get Me Out Of Here" previously released on the Nardwuar the Human Serviette Presents Clam Chowder & Ice Vs Big Macs & Bombers Compilation (1991), NardWuar Records
- "You Can Cry If You Want" previously released on the Groin Thunder Compilation (1992), Dog Meat Records
- "Brand New Chevy" previously released on the Estrus Gearbox Compilation (1992), Estrus Records
- "New Love" previously released as a 7" Single with "I Don't Like You" as a b-side (1991), Sympathy for the Record Industry
- "Guilty" previously released as a 7" Single with "Right In The Eye" as the b-side (1991), Au Go Go Records
- "I Need You" previously released as a 7" Single with "Beat Your Heart Out" as the b-side (1992), Sub Pop
- "Rock & Roll Girl" previously released on the Tannis Root Presents: Freedom of Choice Compilation (1992), Caroline Records
- "Right In The Eye" was an updated version previously released on the Big Mouth promotional EP CD (1993), Warner Bros. Records
- "Everywhere I Go" previously released on the cassette version of The Muffs (1993), Warner Bros. Records
- "No Action" previously released on the Joe King Presents More Bounce To The Ounce Compilation (1997), Lookout Records
- "Become Undone" and "Goodnight Now" previously released as b-sides to the Sad Tomorrow CD Single (1995), Reprise Records
- "Nothing For Me" previously released on the Happy Birthday, Baby Jesus: The Second Coming Compilation (1994), Sympathy for the Record Industry
- "Kids In America" previously released on the Clueless Motion Picture Soundtrack (1995), Capitol Records
- "I'm A Dick" previously released as a 7" Single with "Pacer" as the b-side (1996), Sympathy for the Record Industry
- "My Minds Eye" and "Happening" previously released on the Split Single with Holidays (1999), California Roll
- "Do The Robot" previously released as the b-side to the Big Mouth 7" Single (1993), Sympathy for the Record Industry

=== Early versions ===
- "I Need You" is the 7" version of a song that would later appear on The Muffs (1993), Warner Bros. Records
- "I'm Confused" is an 8-track demo version of a song from Blonder and Blonder (1995), Reprise Records
- "I'm A Dick" is the 7" version of a song that would later appear on Happy Birthday to Me (1997), Reprise Records
- "My Crazy Afternoon" is a demo version of a song from Happy Birthday to Me (1997), Reprise Records
- "Silly People" is a demo version of a song from Alert Today, Alive Tomorrow (1999), Honest Don's

== Personnel ==
- Kim Shattuck - vocals, lead guitar, producer on tracks 15–18, 28 and 29
- Ronnie Barnett - bass, vocals
- Roy McDonald - drums, vocals (tracks 16–29)
- Melanie Vammen - rhythm guitar (tracks 1–9, 11–14, and 30)
- Criss Crass - drums, vocals (tracks 1–9, 11–14, and 30)
- Steve McDonald - backing vocals on "Become Undone"
- C.C. DeVille - lead guitar on "Silly People"
- Courtney Love - answering machine message on "Love"
- Waterbottle Jones - producer on tracks 1–3
- Bill Bartell - producer on tracks 4–7
- Phil Ek - producer on tracks 8 and 9
- Brian Kehew - producer on track 11
- Rob Cavallo - producer on tracks 12–14, 19–23, and 30
- Dave Katznelson - co-producer on tracks 12–14, and 30
- Steve Holroyd - co-producer on tracks 28, and 29
- The Muffs - co-producers on tracks 4–9, 11–14, 19–27, and 30
