= Sound City Studios =

Recording studio in Los Angeles, California

Coordinates: 34.21702°N 118.47039°W

- Industry: Recording studio
- Founded: 1969
- Headquarters: Los Angeles, California, United States
- Website: Official website

Sound City Studios is a recording studio in Los Angeles, California, United States, known as one of the most successful in popular music. The complex opened in 1969 in the Van Nuys neighborhood of Los Angeles. The facility had previously been a production factory of the English musical instrument manufacturer Vox. Throughout the late twentieth century, the studio became known for its signature sound, especially in recording drums and live performances of rock bands.

Hundreds of rock artists spanning five decades have recorded at Sound City, including Grateful Dead, Johnny Cash, Neil Young, Fleetwood Mac, Elton John, U2, Tom Petty and the Heartbreakers, Bob Dylan, Guns N' Roses, Nirvana, Red Hot Chili Peppers, Arctic Monkeys, Metallica, Tool, Slayer, Rage Against the Machine, Slipknot, Death Cab for Cutie, and Fall Out Boy. Over one hundred albums recorded at Sound City have achieved gold and platinum certifications.

The studio leased time for public use until 2011; in 2011 the owners closed the studio and much of the equipment was sold off. From 2011 to 2016, the studio was leased by Fairfax Recordings, who used it as their own exclusive in-house studio. The complex was the focus of the documentary Sound City (2013), directed by musician Dave Grohl. Grohl purchased some of the equipment sold in 2011, including the rare Neve 8028 mixing console that has been credited with creating the "Sound City sound"; it has since been re-installed at Grohl's Studio 606. In 2017 the studio was re-opened for public use and has continued to host artists in the years since.

== History ==
The studio was created by Joe Gottfried and Tom Skeeter, who wanted to start a record company and get into artist management. After a rough start, Skeeter and Gottfried purchased a custom state-of-the-art recording console for $75,175 from the English electronics engineer Rupert Neve: "One of four in the world ... a 28-input, 16-bus, 24-monitor 8028 with 1084 EQs and no automation".

The first song recorded on the console was performed by Buckingham Nicks and led to an invitation to join Fleetwood Mac.

During 1969, Sound City hosted the David Briggs productions Twelve Dreams of Dr. Sardonicus by Spirit and After the Gold Rush by Neil Young. Cult leader Charles Manson recorded in Studio B months before the Manson Family crime spree.

In the 1970s, Neil Young, Dr. John, Spirit, Crazy Horse, and Nitty Gritty Dirt Band, along with other bands, recorded music at the studio. Shelter Records founders Leon Russell and Denny Cordell found a home at Sound City as well, recording Leon Russell, Delaney & Bonnie, and Joe Cocker. Thanks to the Shelter founders, Sound City hosted a young band from Florida named Mudcrutch in 1974, providing an introduction to Tom Petty and the Heartbreakers that resulted in a relationship spanning over two decades.

In 1976, Fleetwood Mac recorded one track at the studio, "Never Going Back Again", from what would become one of the highest selling and most critically acclaimed albums of all time, Rumours.

During the 1980s and 1990s, the studio was used to produce works from Tom Petty and the Heartbreakers, Rick Springfield, Ronnie James Dio, Foreigner, The Black Crowes, and Nirvana. Producer Rick Rubin chose Sound City Studios to record artists like Red Hot Chili Peppers and Johnny Cash (1996's Unchained). He also recorded Metallica's Death Magnetic, which entered the Billboard Top 200 chart at No. 1, at the studio.

Joe Gottfried died in 1992, at the age of 65. Tom Skeeter died on 12 September 2014, at the age of 82. The studio was closed to the public in 2011 and much of the equipment sold off, including the Neve 8028 console from Studio A which was purchased by Dave Grohl, former Nirvana drummer and current frontman of Foo Fighters, who installed it in his Studio 606 in Northridge, California.

In 2011, record label Fairfax Recording leased Studio A for exclusive use of its artists While the studio was left untouched, the control room was refurbished and analog recording equipment even older than the Neve console was added including an ARP 2600 semi-modular analog synthesizer, a Wurlitzer 140B electric piano and EQ modules designed for the Columbia CBS Studios in New York. Artists such as the Cold War Kids, and The Lumineers recorded at the facility during the Fairfax years.

In early 2017 a partnership was formed between Sandy Skeeter, daughter of founder Tom Skeeter, and Olivier Chastan in order to reopen the studio. Sound City is now the home of two of just 11 surviving Helios Type 69 consoles and continues to use classic analog recording techniques in many of its productions. While the control rooms received some upgrades, including Pro Tools, the main studio remains exactly as it was built in 1969.

In 2018, Tony Berg and Blake Mills took over the lease for Sound City Studios.

== Sound ==
Sound City Studios prides itself on having a very particular sound when it comes to recording drums. Toto drummer Jeff Porcaro insisted that one only had to set up the drums in order to get a good drum sound. Producer Rick Rubin said that "guitars sound pretty much the same everywhere, but drums change from room to room, and the sound at Sound City was among the best". Producer Greg Fidelman recorded the sound of a bass drum from each of the big recording studios in the Los Angeles area, subsequently playing the sample for Metallica without divulging from which studio the sound had originated. Based upon this sample, the band chose Sound City Studios to record Death Magnetic. In addition, when asked by Nine Inch Nails to be a guest drummer on some songs, Dave Grohl agreed only if the songs were to be recorded at Sound City Studios. The interior of the main studio has allegedly never been painted over, nor its linoleum tiles changed, due to fear that any such change would directly affect the "legendary sound quality" of the room.

== Discography ==
Year	Artist	Album	Producer
1970	Spirit	Twelve Dreams of Dr. Sardonicus	David Briggs
1970	Neil Young	After the Gold Rush	Neil Young
1970	Neil Young	After the Gold Rush	David Briggs
1970	Neil Young	After the Gold Rush	Kendall Pacios
1972	Dr. John	Dr. John's Gumbo	Jerry Wexler
1973	Buckingham Nicks	Buckingham Nicks	Keith Olsen
1974	Evel Knievel	Evel Knievel	Ron Kramer
1974	Elton John	Caribou	Gus Dudgeon
1974	Bachman–Turner Overdrive	Not Fragile	Randy Bachman
1974	Bill Cosby	At Last Bill Cosby Really Sings	Stu Gardner
1975	Fleetwood Mac	Fleetwood Mac	Keith Olsen
1975	War	Why Can't We Be Friends?	Jerry Goldstein
1975	Nils Lofgren	Nils Lofgren	David Briggs
1976	Rick Springfield	Wait for Night	Mark K. Smith
1977	Grateful Dead	Terrapin Station	Keith Olsen
1977	REO Speedwagon	You Can Tune a Piano, but You Can't Tuna Fish	John Boylan
1977	REO Speedwagon	You Can Tune a Piano, but You Can't Tuna Fish	Gary Richrath
1977	REO Speedwagon	You Can Tune a Piano, but You Can't Tuna Fish	Kevin Cronin
1977	REO Speedwagon	You Can Tune a Piano, but You Can't Tuna Fish	Paul Grupp
1978	Cheap Trick	Heaven Tonight	Tom Werman
1978	Walter Egan	Not Shy	Lindsey Buckingham
1978	Walter Egan	Not Shy	Richard Dashut
1978	Foreigner	Double Vision	Keith Olsen
1979	Tom Petty and the Heartbreakers	Damn the Torpedoes	Jimmy Iovine
1980	Gentle Giant	Civilian	Gentle Giant
1980	Pat Benatar	Crimes of Passion	Keith Olsen
1981	Rick Springfield	Working Class Dog	Keith Olsen
1981	Rick Springfield	Working Class Dog	Bill Drescher
1981	Tom Petty and the Heartbreakers	Hard Promises	Tom Petty
1981	Tom Petty and the Heartbreakers	Hard Promises	Jimmy Iovine
1981	Santana	Zebop!	Keith Olsen
1982	Pat Benatar	Precious Time	Keith Olsen
1982	Hawks	30 Seconds Over Otho	John Ryan
1982	Hawks	30 Seconds Over Otho	Hawks
1982	REO Speedwagon	Good Trouble	Kevin Beamish
1982	Fear	The Record	Gary Lobow
1982	Barry Manilow	Here Comes the Night	Bill Drescher
1982	Rick Springfield	Living in Oz	Bill Drescher
1983	Dio	Holy Diver	Ronnie James Dio
1983	Sharon O'Neill	Foreign Affairs	John Boylan
1984	Ratt	Out of the Cellar	Beau Hill
1984	Rick Springfield	Hard to Hold	Bill Drescher
1984	Lionheart	Hot Tonight	Kevin Beamish
1984	The Winans	Tomorrow	Scott V. Smith
1984	BeBe & CeCe Winans	Lord Lift Us Up	Bill Maxwell
1984	Saxon	Crusader	Kevin Beamish
1985	Tom Petty and the Heartbreakers	Southern Accents	Tom Petty
1985	Tom Petty and the Heartbreakers	Southern Accents	Jimmy Iovine
1985	Loudness	Thunder in the East	Max Norman
1986	Guns N' Roses	Appetite for Destruction (Sound City Sessions)	Mike Clink
1986	Guns N' Roses	Appetite for Destruction (Sound City Sessions)	Manny Charlton
1988	Fleetwood Mac	Greatest Hits	
1989	Keel	Larger Than Live	Ron Keel
1989	Dangerous Toys	Dangerous Toys	Max Norman
1991	Nirvana	Nevermind	Butch Vig
1992	Kyuss	Blues for the Red Sun	Kyuss
1992	Kyuss	Blues for the Red Sun	Chris Goss
1992	Masters of Reality	Sunrise on the Sufferbus	Chris Goss
1992	Masters of Reality	Sunrise on the Sufferbus	Ginger Baker
1992	Rage Against the Machine	Rage Against the Machine	Garth Richardson
1992	Green Jellÿ	Cereal Killer	Sylvia Massy
1992	L7	Bricks Are Heavy	Butch Vig
1992	L7	Bricks Are Heavy	L7
1992	Nick Cave and the Bad Seeds	Henry's Dream	David Briggs
1992	Robben Ford & The Blue Line	Robben Ford & the Blue Line	Robben Ford
1992	Robben Ford & The Blue Line	Robben Ford & the Blue Line	Roscoe Beck
1993	Kyuss	Welcome to Sky Valley	Kyuss
1993	Kyuss	Welcome to Sky Valley	Chris Goss
1993	Tool	Undertow	Sylvia Massy
1993	Tool	Undertow	C.J. Buscaglia
1993	Rancid	Rancid	Brett Gurewitz
1993	Tom Petty	Greatest Hits	
1993	Robben Ford & The Blue Line	Mystic Mile	Robben Ford
1993	Robben Ford & The Blue Line	Mystic Mile	Roscoe Beck
1993	Robben Ford & The Blue Line	Mystic Mile	Tom Brechtlein
1993	The Muffs	The Muffs	Rob Cavallo
1993	The Muffs	The Muffs	David Katznelson
1993	The Muffs	The Muffs	The Muffs
1993	The Pursuit of Happiness	The Downward Road	Ed Stasium
1994	Tom Petty	Wildflowers	Rick Rubin
1994	The Black Crowes	Amorica	Jack Joseph Puig
1994	Slayer	Divine Intervention	Rick Rubin
1994	Slayer	Divine Intervention	Toby Wright
1994	Slayer	Divine Intervention	Slayer
1995	Dashboard Prophets	Burning Out the Inside	Garth Richardson
1995	Red Hot Chili Peppers	One Hot Minute	Rick Rubin
1995	Kerbdog	On the Turn	Garth Richardson
1995	Kyuss	...And the Circus Leaves Town	Chris Goss
1995	The Jayhawks	Tomorrow the Green Grass	George Drakoulias
1996	Tom Petty and the Heartbreakers	Songs and Music from "She's the One"	Tom Petty
1996	Carl Perkins	Go Cat Go!	Various artists
1996	Carl Perkins	Go Cat Go!	Eddie Kramer
1996	Johnny Cash	Unchained	Rick Rubin
1996	Weezer	Pinkerton	Weezer
1996	Weezer	Pinkerton	David Fridmann
1996	Tonic	Lemon Parade	Jack Joseph Puig
1996	Jimmy Eat World	Static Prevails	Wes Kidd
1996	Jimmy Eat World	Static Prevails	Mark Trombino
1997	Bruce Dickinson	Accident of Birth	Roy Z
1997	Fu Manchu	The Action Is Go	Jay Noel Yuenger
1997	Raimundos	Lapadas do Povo	Mark Dearnley
1998	Various artists	Godzilla: The Album	Foo Fighters
1998	Frank Black and the Catholics	Frank Black and the Catholics	Frank Black
1998	Bruce Dickinson	The Chemical Wedding	Roy Z
1998	Superdrag	Head Trip in Every Key	Jerry Finn
1998	Superdrag	Head Trip in Every Key	Superdrag
1998	System of a Down	System of a Down	Rick Rubin
1998	System of a Down	System of a Down	System of a Down
1999	Frank Black and the Catholics	Pistolero	Nick Vincent
1999	Jimmy Eat World	Clarity	Mark Trombino
1999	The Muffs	Alert Today, Alive Tomorrow	Kim Shattuck
1999	The Muffs	Alert Today, Alive Tomorrow	Steve Holroyd
1999	Tonic	Sugar	
2000	A Perfect Circle	Mer de Noms	Billy Howerdel
2000	Queens of the Stone Age	Rated R	Chris Goss
2001	Black Rebel Motorcycle Club	B.R.M.C.	Black Rebel Motorcycle Club
2001	Frank Black and the Catholics	Dog in the Sand	Nick Vincent
2001	Slipknot	Iowa	Ross Robinson
2001	Treble Charger	Wide Awake Bored	Matt Hyde
2001	Fu Manchu	California Crossing	Matt Hyde
2001	Vanilla Ice	Bi-Polar	Vanilla Ice
2003	Matchbook Romance	West for Wishing	Brett Gurewitz
2003	Hotwire	The Routine	Matt Hyde
2003	Kings of Leon	Youth & Young Manhood	Ethan Johns
2003	Poison the Well	You Come Before You	Pelle Henricsson
2003	Rancid	Indestructible	Brett Gurewitz
2004	Ash (band)	Meltdown	Nick Raskulinecz
2004	Bad Religion	The Empire Strikes First	Brett Gurewitz
2004	Mark Lanegan Band	Bubblegum	Chris Goss
2004	Mark Lanegan Band	Bubblegum	Mark Lanegan
2005	Queens of the Stone Age	Lullabies to Paralyze	Joe Barresi
2005	Wolfmother	Wolfmother	Dave Sardy
2005	Nine Inch Nails	With Teeth	Trent Reznor
2005	Madrugada	The Deep End	George Drakoulias
2005	Ry Cooder	Chávez Ravine	Ry Cooder
2005	Team Sleep	Team Sleep	Greg Wells
2005	Team Sleep	Team Sleep	Team Sleep
2005	The Like	Are You Thinking What I'm Thinking?	Wendy Melvoin
2005	Robert Cray Band	Twenty	Robert Cray
2005	Robert Cray Band	Twenty	Jim Pugh
2006	Zico Chain	Food	Joe Barresi
2007	Mavis Staples	We'll Never Turn Back	Ry Cooder
2007	Sebastian Bach	Angel Down	Roy Z
2008	Cold War Kids	Loyalty to Loyalty	Kevin Augunas
2008	Cold War Kids	Loyalty to Loyalty	Cold War Kids
2008	Satyricon	The Age of Nero	Sigurd Wongraven
2008	Metallica	Death Magnetic	Rick Rubin
2008	Nine Inch Nails	The Slip	Trent Reznor
2008	Elvis Costello and the Imposters	Momofuku	Elvis Costello
2008	Elvis Costello and the Imposters	Momofuku	Jason Lader
2009	BigBang	Edendale	Greg Richling
2009	Kid Rock	Born Free	Rick Rubin
2009	The Higher	It's Only Natural	Mike Green
2009	Wolfmother	Cosmic Egg	Alan Moulder
2010	Josh Groban	Illuminations	Rick Rubin
2010	Death Cab for Cutie	Codes and Keys	Chris Walla
2010	Death Cab for Cutie	Codes and Keys	Death Cab for Cutie
2010	Triggerfinger	All This Dancin' Around	Greg Gordon
2010	Year Long Disaster	Black Magic; All Mysteries Revealed	Nick Raskulinecz
2011	Mastodon	The Hunter	Mike Elizondo
2011	Everclear	Return to Santa Monica	Nathaniel Kunkel
2011	Everclear	Return to Santa Monica	Art Alexakis
2011	Arctic Monkeys	Suck It and See	James Ford
2011	Haloes	Living Like Kings In Confined Spaces	Greg Richling
2011	Noah and the Whale	Last Night on Earth	Noah and the Whale
2011	The Lonely Forest	Arrows	Chris Walla
2011	Monstro Flora	Between the Stars	Greg Richling
2018	Fall Out Boy	Mania	
2018	Death Cab for Cutie	Thank You for Today	Rich Costey
2018	Boygenius	Boygenius	Boygenius
2018	The Crystal Method	The Trip Home	Tiny E
2019	Andrew Bird	My Finest Work Yet	Paul Butler
2019	Big Thief	Two Hands	Andrew Sarlo
2019	Perfume Genius	Set My Heart On Fire Immediately	Blake Mills
2020	Phoebe Bridgers	Punisher	Tony Berg
2020	Phoebe Bridgers	Punisher	Phoebe Bridgers
2020	Phoebe Bridgers	Punisher	Ethan Gruska
2020	Bob Dylan	Rough and Rowdy Ways	None listed
2020	The Killers	Imploding the Mirage	
2020	The Fearless Flyers	Tailwinds	Cory Wong
2020	The Fearless Flyers	Tailwinds	Jack Stratton
2021	Switchfoot	Interrobang	Tony Berg
2022	Jack Johnson	Meet the Moonlight	Blake Mills
2022	Marcus Mumford	Marcus Mumford	Blake Mills
2025	Perfume Genius	Glory	Blake Mills
2025	Pino Palladino and Blake Mills	That Wasn't a Dream	Pino Palladino
2025	Pino Palladino and Blake Mills	That Wasn't a Dream	Blake Mills
2025	Sarah McLachlan	Better Broken	Tony Berg
2025	Sarah McLachlan	Better Broken	Will Maclellan
2026	The Departures	Why The Long Face?	Shane Isom

== See also ==
- Comparison of analog and digital recording
