= I Get It (disambiguation) =

"I Get It" is a 2007 song by Chevelle.

I Get It may also refer to:

- "I Get It", a song by Boom Bip and Doseone from the album Circle, 2000
- "I Get It", a song by Kate Voegele from the album Don't Look Away, 2007
- "I Get It", a song by Lil' Kim from the mixtape Ms. G.O.A.T., 2008
- "I Get It", a song by Meek Mill and Travis Scott from the mixtape Dreamchasers 2, 2012
- "I Get It", a song by the Muffs from the album Whoop Dee Doo, 2014
- "I Get It", a song by Tedashii from the EP This Time Around, 2016
- "I Get It", a 2016 song by Kwame
- "I Get It", a 2020 song by Kelly Rowland

== See also ==
- I Got It (disambiguation)
