= Silly People =

Silly People may refer to:

- Silly People (Desperate Housewives)
- "Silly People", 1968 single by The Litter
- "Silly People", Stephen Sondheim song from A Little Night Music
- "Silly People", song by the Muffs from Alert Today, Alive Tomorrow
