= Nikki Corvette =

American singer

- Occupation: Musician
- Years active: 1980–present

Nikki Corvette (born Dominique Lorenz in Detroit, MI), is a singer best known as a member of the band Nikki and the Corvettes from 1977 through 1981.

== Biography ==
=== Early life ===
Corvette grew up in Detroit, Michigan. She was always fascinated with music, and at 16 ran away from home because her mother refused to allow her to attend an MC5 concert.

=== Nikki and the Corvettes ===
In late 1977 or early 1978, a friend of hers arranged for Nikki to headline a concert at a bar. At the time, she was not a member of a band, and she spent the next few weeks organizing Nikki and the Corvettes. The new band had never rehearsed, and played together for the first time at the concert. Originally, they played mainly cover songs as well as a few original songs written by Corvette and her former boyfriend Peter James, who had played with the Romantics. The Corvettes were signed by Bomp! Records and released an album, Nikki and the Corvettes, in 1980. Mike Miliard of the Boston Phoenix described the album as "power pop perfection" which "[split] the difference between the Ronettes and the Ramones". Adrian Mack of The Georgia Straight describes Corvette's early work as a "brief, if beautiful, career belting out innocently snotty bubblegum punk with the gutter-budget girl group Nikki and the Corvettes. Their solitary, highly prized 1980 album is still launching new bands and teenage-misfit boners, though Corvette herself didn't realize its impact until a reissue in 2000."

Nikki and the Corvettes disbanded in 1981. At this time, it was still more common for a man, rather than a woman, to front a rock band. The notoriety that Nikki Corvette earned for her role in breaking those barriers led to her being namechecked in the song "Gimme My Radio" by The Donnas.

=== Nikki and the Stingrays ===
Corvette returned to music in 2003, forming a new band called Nikki and the Stingrays. Corvette described the new band as "the next progression of the Corvettes. It's got the same quality to some of it, but I grew up a little bit. Which is good, since it's only what, 27 years later?" The Stingrays released an album, Back to Detroit on Dollar Records.

=== Gorevette ===
After the release of this album, Corvette moved back to Detroit, where she became friends with Amy Gore of the Gore Gore Girls. The two wrote several songs together, with Corvette providing the lyrics and Gore the music. In 2009 they formed the band Gorevette. Gorvette performed a fall 2010 tour opening for bands including Blondie and The Donnas.

=== Later career ===
In 2012, she appeared at the "Girls Got Rhythm" fest in St. Paul, MN alongside artists such as Ronnie Spector, the Muffs, the 5.6.7.8's and L'Assassins.
