= Happy Birthday to Me (album) =

Studio album by the Muffs
- Released: May 20, 1997
- Genres: Punk rock, pop punk, garage rock
- Length: 35:37
- Label: Reprise
- Producer: Kim Shattuck

The Muffs chronology
Blonder and Blonder (1995)	Happy Birthday to Me (1997)	Alert Today, Alive Tomorrow (1999)

Happy Birthday to Me is the third album by the American pop punk band the Muffs. It was released in 1997 on Reprise Records.

Happy Birthday to Me was vocalist/guitarist Kim Shattuck's favorite Muffs album.

== Critical reception ==
Professional ratings
Review scores
Source	Rating
AllMusic	4/5 stars
Robert Christgau	(dud)
Entertainment Weekly	B
MusicHound Rock: The Essential Album Guide	3/5 stars

The Washington Post wrote that "the band's most convincing songs are designed for those with short attention spans and bad attitudes: Shattuck's guitar snarls, she gripes and then they're over." The Los Angeles Times called the songs "concise, crisply played and melodic." Salon wrote that the album "takes the listener on a blissful, blistering 45-minute joyride."

== Track listing ==
All songs written by Kim Shattuck.

1. "Crush Me" – 1.48
2. "That Awful Man" – 1.59
3. "Honeymoon" – 1.55
4. "All Blue Baby" – 2.50
5. "My Crazy Afternoon" – 2.35
6. "Is It All Okay?" – 3.01
7. "Pennywhore" – 1.21
8. "Outer Space" – 3.12
9. "I'm a Dick" – 1.53
10. "Nothing" – 1.28
11. "Where Only I Could Go" – 2.09
12. "Upside Down" – 2.42
13. "You and Your Parrot" – 2.17
14. "Keep Holding Me" – 3.09
15. "The Best Time Around" – 3.18

== Personnel ==
- Kim Shattuck – Guitar, Vocals
- Ronnie Barnett – Bass
- Roy McDonald – Drums
- Sally Browder and Steve Holroyd – Engineer
- The Muffs – Producer
