= Blonder and Blonder =

Studio album by the Muffs
- Released: April 11, 1995
- Genre: Punk rock
- Length: 34:26
- Label: Reprise
- Producer: Rob Cavallo; the Muffs

The Muffs chronology
The Muffs (1993)	Blonder and Blonder (1995)	Happy Birthday to Me (1997)

Professional ratings
Review scores
Source	Rating
AllMusic	4/5 stars
Robert Christgau	3/5 stars
Entertainment Weekly	A−
PopMatters	7/10 stars

Blonder and Blonder is the second album by the pop punk band the Muffs, released on April 11, 1995, via Reprise Records. The album contains the single "Sad Tomorrow". In 2016, the album was remastered and expanded by Omnivore Recordings, featuring 7 additional tracks, 5 of which were previously unreleased.

== Track listing ==
All tracks written by Kim Shattuck.

1. "Agony" – 2:27
2. "Oh Nina" – 2:39
3. "On and On" – 1:45
4. "Sad Tomorrow" – 2:09
5. "What You've Done" – 1:57
6. "Red Eyed Troll" – 3:45
7. "End It All" – 1:49
8. "Laying on a Bed of Roses" – 2:11
9. "I Need a Face" – 2:14
10. "Won't Come Out to Play" – 1:51
11. "Funny Face" – 3:20
12. "Ethyl My Love" – 2:39
13. "I'm Confused" – 3:41
14. "Just a Game" – 1:59

=== 2016 Omnivore Recordings remastered and expanded release ===
1. "Agony" – 2:27
2. "Oh Nina" – 2:39
3. "On and On" – 1:45
4. "Sad Tomorrow" – 2:09
5. "What You've Done" – 1:57
6. "Red Eyed Troll" – 3:45
7. "End It All" – 1:49
8. "Laying on a Bed of Roses" – 2:11
9. "I Need a Face" – 2:14
10. "Won't Come Out to Play" – 1:51
11. "Funny Face" – 3:20
12. "Ethyl My Love" – 2:39
13. "I'm Confused" – 3:41
14. "Just a Game" – 1:59
15. "Goodnight Now" – 2:24
16. "Become Undone" – 3:27
17. "Born Today" (Demo)* – 3:35
18. "Look at Me" (Demo)* – 3:41
19. "Pennywhore" (Demo)* – 1:15
20. "Red Eyed Troll" (Demo)* – 3:42
21. "Won't Come Out to Play" (Demo)* – 2:52
22. [Untitled and unlisted hidden track]* – 1:06

Note

- * Previously unreleased. Track 22 is an untitled and unlisted track that, when played backward, reveals a short song with the lyrics "the fun never stops with you" as the primary refrain.

== Non-album tracks ==
Songs recorded for the album and released as non-album B-sides include:

- "Goodnight Now" - appears on the Sad Tomorrow single.
- "Become Undone" - appears on the Sad Tomorrow single.

All of the B-sides from this album, were released on the B-side compilation album Hamburger.

== Personnel ==
- Kim Shattuck – Guitar, vocals
- Ronnie Barnett – Bass
- Roy McDonald – Drums
- Rob Cavallo – Producer
- Neill King – Engineer
- The Muffs – Producer
