= Pacer (album) =

Studio album by the Amps
- Released: October 1995
- Recorded: 1995
- Genres: Alternative rock, lo-fi
- Length: 33:47
- Labels: 4AD (UK), Elektra (US)

Singles from Pacer
- 1. "Tipp City" Released: 1995

Pacer is the only album by the Amps, led by Kim Deal. It was released in October 1995. The album was recorded as a side project to Kim Deal's group the Breeders. She recruited new musicians and naming the group the Amps, recorded Pacer at several studios in the US and Ireland, with different engineers, including Steve Albini, Bryce Goggin, and John Agnello.

The album received mixed reviews. Despite radio airplay for its single, "Tipp City", Pacer did not sell well. The Amps toured in 1995 and 1996 with Sonic Youth, Guided by Voices, and Foo Fighters. In 1996, Deal changed the band's name back to the Breeders, making Pacer the Amps' only album.

== Background ==
Kim Deal's band the Breeders released Last Splash in August 1993; the album was very successful, and its release was followed by much touring. The Breeders then took an extended break from activity. One reason was that Deal's sister Kelley, who was also in the group, was arrested on drug charges in November 1994. Member Josephine Wiggs likewise took time away from the band, although Wiggs and Deal have different memories of the circumstances surrounding this. Wiggs recalls offering to be involved if Deal's next album was going to be a Breeders record, but having the impression that Deal wanted to do a solo release; Deal remembers Wiggs declining to be part of any immediate Breeders' recording, but offering to be on the one after that.

Regardless, Deal envisioned her next album as a solo effort, and intended to play all instruments herself. Back at her home in Dayton, Ohio, she practiced the drums and initially prepared six songs for recording. Around the same time, she produced some tracks for Guided by Voices at Easley-McCain Studios in Memphis, Tennessee. While there, Deal used a portion of the studio time to record demos for some of her new songs. As an attempt to distract her sister from her drug problems, Deal recruited Kelley to play on three songs at this initial recording session. Kelley's involvement changed Deal's mind about playing all the instruments herself, and she began to conceptualize the album as a band project.

After the Easley recording session, Deal returned to Dayton. She asked Breeders' drummer Jim Macpherson to play drums in the new project, and Dayton musicians Luis Lerma and Nate Farley to play bass and guitar, respectively. Deal adopted a stage persona for herself named Tammy Ampersand, and called the band "Tammy and the Amps"; this later evolved into simply "the Amps". The group began by performing at small shows, and learned the songs well to prepare for recording the album. At some point during the recording sessions, Kelley's drug difficulties and rehabilitation prevented her from continuing as a member of the band.

== Recording ==
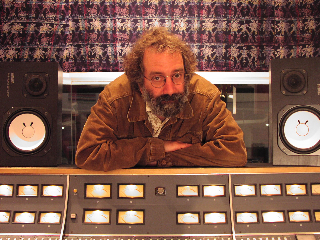
John Agnello was one of several engineers who helped to record Pacer.

Pacer was recorded at seven studios in total, with different engineers each time. The track "Tipp City" was used from the original session at Easley-McCain Studios, recorded in February 1995 and engineered by Doug Easley and Davis McCain. The Amps' next session was with engineer Steve Albini at his Chicago studio. (Note: The Pacer liner notes list the engineer for this session as "Fluss". AllMusic writer Mark Derning notes that this was the name of Albini's cat, and that Albini sometimes used this name for his engineering and production work.) Deal had previously worked with Albini on the Pixies' Surfer Rosa and the Breeders' Pod releases. The Amps and Albini recorded songs including further versions of "Tipp City", which are unreleased, and "Hoverin"; an earlier version of the latter song had previously been released on the Breeders' "Divine Hammer" single in October 1993. Other recording sessions, whose various engineers included Bryce Goggin and John Agnello, took place at studios in Long Island and Woodstock, New York, as well as Dayton, Los Angeles, and Dublin, Ireland.

In a 1996 interview, Deal said that for Pacer, she focused on the vocals: "Usually, I tend to spend more time with the instruments. Last Splash had quite a few instrumentals and quite a few songs where I might say five words. [On Pacer, the] songs are all vocal-heavy. The vocal leads, and if you take the vocal away, you don't have much of a song." The sound of the album has been described as "lo-fi".

== Release ==
Pacer was released in late October 1995. It was promoted with a full-page advertisement in NME in the UK, where it peaked at No. 60 on the UK Albums Chart, and No. 29 on the American Heatseekers Album chart. "Tipp City" was released as the album's single and included an alternate version of "Empty Glasses", as well as a cover of the Tasties' "Just Like a Briar". The single received some radio airplay in the USA, and reached No. 61 on the UK Singles Chart, but Pacer did not sell well. Although Elektra pressed 300,000 copies of the album, The New York Times reported in 2002 that it had sold 25,000 copies. The album became prominent in second-hand shops.

== Reception ==
Professional ratings
Review scores
Source	Rating
AllMusic	4.5/5 stars
Entertainment Weekly	C+
NME	7/10
Pitchfork	8.2/10
Rolling Stone	3/5 stars
Spin (1996)	7/10
Spin (2008)	3.5/5 stars
The Village Voice	B+

Critical appraisal of Pacer has been mixed. Reviewing for AllMusic, Stephen Thomas Erlewine describes the album as "exciting, gut-level rock & roll". The Rough Guide to Rock calls Pacer "satisfyingly lo-fi". In Spin magazine, reviewer Joy Press writes that the album includes "a half-dozen gems" but that its overall "foggy sound" and "indecipherable lyrics" prevent the listener from fully embracing the work. Village Voice critic Robert Christgau considers the album's songs to be "definitely slight" and "uneven" but praises the vocals, stating that "speedy or dreamy, Kim Deal sounds so sane, so unpretentious, so goddamn nice that you want to take her home and give her a shampoo". In The Trouser Press Guide to '90s Rock, critic Ira Robbins writes that "Other than the fine title track and a few others, the performances are forced and lackluster; the production varies between flat and colorless." The New Rolling Stone Album Guide similarly praises the title song while dismissing the rest of the album as "forgettable". In the first ever Pitchfork review, Ryan Schreiber found the album's lo-fi sound initially off-putting but praised the lyrics and "awesome rock".

Pacer is a favorite album of actor Elijah Wood, who said "I think Pacer has everything. It's kind of experimental; there's a lot of vocal experimentation on the record. I love the recording. [...] The drums are very abrasive and raw, and it has everything. There's an incredible mix of pop songs and weird, kind of abrasive almost punk rock songs, and there's real beauty I think on this record." In 2003, Chris Ott of Pitchfork included the album in a list of "The 20 Worst Post-Breakup Debacles", arguing that the Amps were "an interim project" whose album should not have been released; "clamoring for pennies still falling from a sky 'Cannonball' had blown open, their sloppily assembled, barely written album was a mistake."

== Aftermath ==
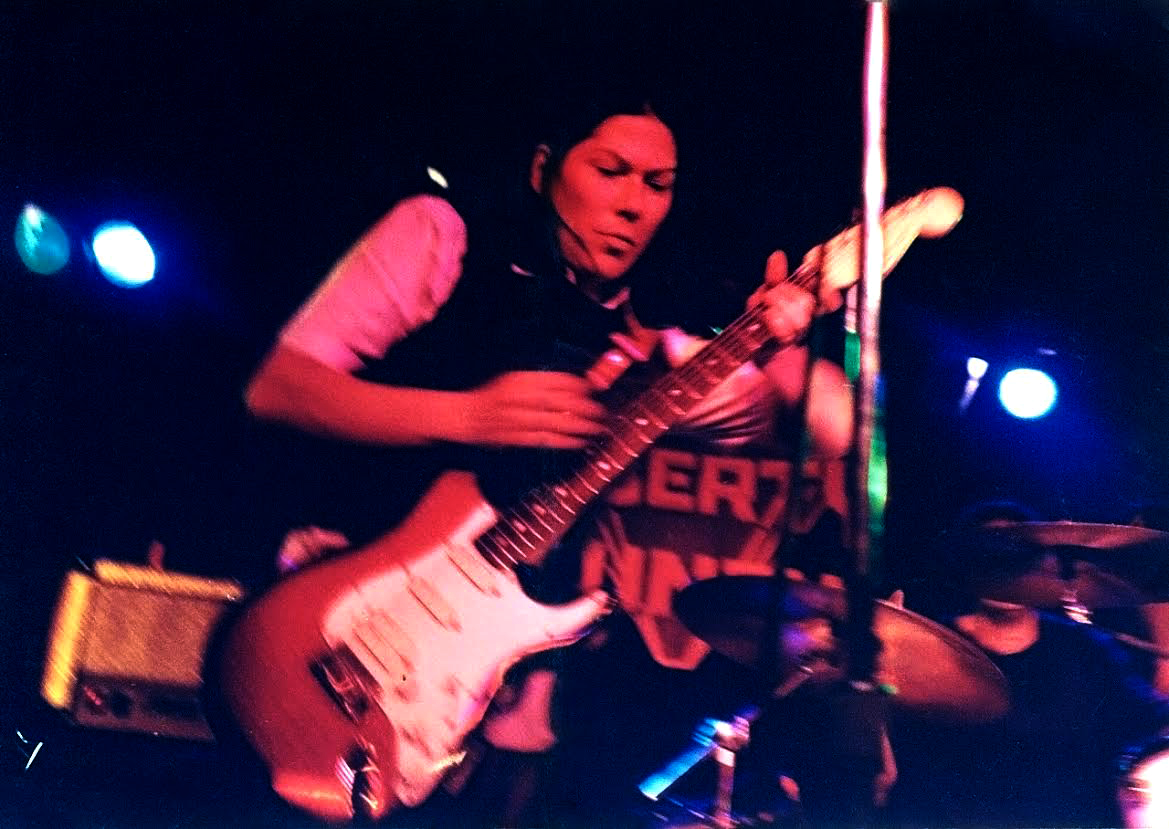
Kim Deal playing guitar with the Amps in 1995

The Amps toured in 1995 and 1996, supporting Guided by Voices, Sonic Youth, Helium, and Foo Fighters. Later in 1996, they recruited Carrie Bradley (who had played on Pod), and Deal changed its name back to the Breeders. The band's lineup continued to evolve, and within a few years, Deal was the only of the former Amps left in the group. Pacer is the sole album that the Amps released.

A number of artists have covered songs from Pacer. The Muffs included a version of "Pacer" on their compilation albums Hamburger and Kaboodle. On Gigantic: A Tribute to Kim Deal, released on American Laundromat Records, the German Art Students covered "Bragging Party" and Tara King Theory, "Tipp City". Musician Girl Talk included a sample of "Tipp City" on "Touch 2 Feel" on his album Unstoppable. The Breeders themselves released a new version of "Full on Idle" on Title TK (2002) and over the years have sometimes performed Amps' songs at their concerts. (Note: Reviews of Breeders' concerts in 1997, 2000, 2001, 2002, 2008, 2009, 2010, and 2017 have noted the inclusion of Amps' songs in the band's set lists.)

== Track listing ==
All tracks are written by Kim Deal, except where noted.

No.	Title	Writer(s)	Length
1.	"Pacer"		2:31
2.	"Tipp City"		2:08
3.	"I Am Decided"	Robert Pollard, Kim Deal (Note: Former Guided by Voices bassist James Greer notes that the Amps' "I Am Decided" was an amalgamation of two Guided by Voices songs: "I Am Decided" and "Are You Faster", both of which Deal was given permission to use. The Guided by Voices versions later appeared on the compilation Suitcase 2: American Superdream Wow, where they are credited to band songwriter Robert Pollard.)	2:28
4.	"Mom's Drunk"		1:42
5.	"Bragging Party"		4:32
6.	"Hoverin'"		2:46
7.	"First Revival"		2:53
8.	"Full on Idle"		2:18
9.	"Breaking the Split Screen Barrier"		3:07
10.	"Empty Glasses"		2:39
11.	"She's a Girl"		1:50
12.	"Dedicated"		4:12

== Chart positions ==
Chart (1995)	Peak position
UK Album Chart	60
US Heatseekers Album Chart	29
