= Sorry for Partyin' =

2009 album by Bowling for Soup

Studio album by Bowling for Soup
- Released: October 12, 2009
- Recorded: April–July 2009; Austin, Texas
- Genre: Pop-punk
- Length: 49:04
- Label: Jive
- Producers: Linus of Hollywood; Jaret Reddick

Bowling for Soup chronology
| Bowling for Soup: Live and Very Attractive (2008) | Sorry for Partyin' (2009) | Merry Flippin' Christmas: Vol. 1 (2009) |

Bowling for Soup studio chronology
| The Great Burrito Extortion Case (2006) | Sorry for Partyin' (2009) | Fishin' for Woos (2011) |

Singles from Sorry for Partyin'
- 1. "My Wena" Released: July 28, 2009; 2. "No Hablo Inglés" Released: 2009

Professional ratings
Review scores
| Source | Rating |
|---|---|
| AbsolutePunk | (23%) |
| AllMusic | 3.5/5 stars |
| Kerrang! | 3/5 stars |

Sorry for Partyin' is the seventh studio album by American rock band Bowling for Soup. It is the band's final album to be released by Jive Records. It was released on October 12, 2009, debuting at No. 104 on the Billboard 200 and No. 47 on Rock albums. No single was released to the radio for the album.

== Production and recording ==
The band began working on the album in January 2009 in Austin, Texas by working with people like Linus of Hollywood, Scott Reynolds, Tony Scalzo, Parry Gripp and Kim Shattuck. The band entered the studio on January 21 with 18 demos and a list of names for possible guest appearances. The band recorded for over a month, recording 18 tracks and finished recording in early March 2009.

One local Austin, Texas fan by the name of Lindsay was selected by the band to sit in during the recording process with the purpose of providing studio updates that would be posted for the band's official website. The recording process began with Gary's drumming sessions. "I Can't Stand L.A." was the first titled song published. Also that month Erik recorded bass for "I Don't Wish You Were Dead Anymore" and "America (Wake Up Amy). Guitars were recorded for "Choke", "If Only", and "BFFF" on January 31. In February "Goodbye Friend" and 4 more songs were recorded on guitar then Jaret would start the vocal tracks. Scott Reynolds of the band ALL would stop by to discuss singing on the album. Afterward, the band left Austin to record the B-sides for the album in their hometown.

Bowling for Soup recorded 27 songs for the album as of June 2009. On August 8, Jaret posted on Twitter that the band had enough songs for a double album, but will only be putting 12-14 of those songs onto this album.

== Release ==
In promotion for the album, the band embarked on a tour titled the "Party in Your Pants Tour". The tour only had dates scheduled in the UK beginning on October 17, 2009, in Glasgow and ending on October 29, 2009, in London. They played a few shows in December 2009 leading up to Christmas. Following this, they embarked on a US tour in January and February 2010.

== Track listing ==
All tracks are written by Jaret Reddick, with additional songwriters listed.

| No. | Title | Writer(s) | Length |
|---|---|---|---|
| 1. | "A Really Cool Dance Song" | Linus of Hollywood | 3:44 |
| 2. | "No Hablo Inglés" | Linus of Hollywood | 3:30 |
| 3. | "My Wena" | Linus of Hollywood | 2:50 |
| 4. | "Only Young" | Sam Hollander, Dave Katz | 3:46 |
| 5. | "I Don't Wish You Were Dead Anymore" | Tony Scalzo | 2:46 |
| 6. | "BFFF" | | 3:52 |
| 7. | "Me With No You" | Zac Maloy | 3:44 |
| 8. | "Hooray for Beer" | Linus of Hollywood | 3:27 |
| 9. | "America (Wake Up Amy)" (featuring Scott Reynolds and Parry Gripp) | | 3:26 |
| 10. | "If Only" | | 3:39 |
| 11. | "I Gotchoo" | Linus of Hollywood | 3:44 |
| 12. | "Love Goes Boom" | Maloy | 4:09 |
| 13. | "I Can't Stand L.A." | | 2:50 |
| 14. | "Belgium Polka" (hidden track on US edition; featuring Brave Combo) | | 3:35 |
| Total length: | | | 50:02 |

Bonus tracks

U.S. deluxe digital download
| No. | Title | Length |
|---|---|---|
| 15. | "I Just Wanna Be Loved" | 4:20 |
| 16. | "Choke" | 4:12 |
| 17. | "Everything to Me" | 3:52 |
| Total length: | | 65:56 |

U.S. Amazon.com deluxe digital download
| No. | Title | Length |
|---|---|---|
| 15. | "I Just Wanna Be Loved" | 4:20 |
| 16. | "Choke" | 4:12 |
| 17. | "Everything to Me" | 3:52 |
| 18. | "Reality" (bonus track on amazon.com only) | 3:30 |

UK edition
| No. | Title | Writer(s) | Length |
|---|---|---|---|
| 15. | "I Just Wanna Be Loved" | | 4:20 |
| 16. | "Walk of Shame" | | 3:57 |
| 17. | "Amateur Night" | | 3:51 |
| 18. | "I Gotchoo (Other Version)" | Linus of Hollywood | 3:34 |
| Total length: | | | 65:40 |

Japanese edition
| No. | Title | Length |
|---|---|---|
| 15. | "My Girlfriend Sucks" | 3:21 |
| Total length: | | 53:23 |

B-sides

| No. | Title | Writer(s) | Length |
|---|---|---|---|
| 1. | "Amateur Night" (Bowling for Soup decided to give out a new song titled "Amateur Night" for free on their street team site for a limited time. When opened with iTunes the album comes up as Sorry For B-sides. Also available on the U.K. version of the album) | | 3:52 |
| 2. | "I'll Always Remember You (That Way)" (featuring Kim Shattuck of The Muffs; released as part of the My Wena EP) | | 3:40 |
| 3. | "Goodbye Friend" (released as part of the My Wena EP. The song was also made available as a free download on the band's official online store in memory of Jeff "FFroe" Roe from December 17–18, 2009) | | 3:51 |
| 4. | "Girl All The Bad Guys Want (Acoustic Version)" (from Sorry For Partyin' Instant Downloads when you pre-order the CD from the band's website) | | 3:35 |
| 5. | "My Wena (Acoustic)" (from Sorry For Partyin' Instant Downloads when you pre-order the CD from the band's website) | | 2:43 |
| 6. | "Mediocre^{[A]}" (demo) | Linus of Hollywood | 3:11 |

== Singles and videos ==
My Wena EP

EP by Bowling for Soup
- Released: August 7, 2009
- Recorded: April–July 2009; Austin, Texas
- Genre: Pop-punk
- Length: 10:20
- Label: RCA/Jive
- Producers: Linus of Hollywood, Jaret Reddick

According to frontman Jaret Reddick in his ninth Bowling for Soup podcast, "No Hablo Inglés" was supposed to be released to radio stations in January 2010 as the album's first single. However, Bowling for Soup was dropped from Jive Records shortly after the release of Sorry for Partyin' and because of this, songs like "My Wena" and "No Hablo Inglés" that had released music videos were not released as radio singles.

=== My Wena ===
The song "My Wena" first previewed on May 5, 2009, on the Lex and Terry show. A music video for the song was filmed and the video was released on July 21, 2009. The song was released to iTunes on July 28, 2009. The video was filmed at and around Gary Wiseman's home in Prosper, TX. Dallas photographer Jason Janik shot the single's cover art in between filming for the video. An EP featuring the song, titled the My Wena EP was released digitally August 7, 2009. A clean version of the "My Wena" video (later titled the "Puppy Version") was released on the band's official YouTube page on August 28, 2009.

My Wena EP
| No. | Title | Writer(s) | Length |
|---|---|---|---|
| 1. | "My Wena" | Jaret Reddick, Linus of Hollywood | 2:49 |
| 2. | "I'll Always Remember You (That Way)" (featuring Kim Shattuck of The Muffs) | Reddick, Zac Maloy | 3:40 |
| 3. | "Goodbye Friend" | Reddick, Linus of Hollywood | 3:51 |

=== No Hablo Inglés ===
The song "No Hablo Inglés" first premiered to members on the BFS Army site to those who had contributed. The page claims this is the first single.

The music video for the song is a parody of the As seen on TV infomercials. In the video, Jaret Reddick stands in front of a TV studio audience and portrays a motivational speaker offering his "fool-proof" solution to any problem – simply reply "No Hablo Inglés" (Spanish for "I don't speak English") and the problem disappears. The video features a telephone number (which answers to a Bowling for Soup fan line) and an address (a private mailbox at a UPS Store in Flower Mound, Texas, located south of Denton).

== Release history ==
| Country | Date |
|---|---|
| United Kingdom | October 12, 2009 |
| United States | October 13, 2009 |
| Japan | October 14, 2009 |

== Personnel ==
Bowling for Soup

- Jaret Reddick — vocals, rhythm guitar, co-producer
- Erik Chandler — bass, backing vocals
- Chris Burney — lead guitar, backing vocals
- Gary Wiseman — drums

Production

- Linus of Hollywood - co-producer, guitar, keyboards, backing vocals, gang vocals, fart noises, percussion
- Peter McCabe - engineering at Wire Recording Studio, Austin, TX
- Assisted by Joey Benjamin
- Will Krienke - studio assistant
- Matt Ralls & Kent Chandler - studio interns
- Casey Diiorio - engineering at Valve Studios, Dallas, TX ("No Hablo Inglés"); additional recording at Valve Studios, Dallas, TX and Kingsize Soundlabs, Los Angeles
- Chris Lord-Alge - mixing at Mix L.A.
- Keith Armstrong & Nik Karpen - assistant mix engineers
- Brad Townsend & Andrew Schubert - additional mix engineering
- Tom Coyne - mastering at Sterling Sound, NYC
- Tony Scalzo - piano & organ on "BFFF", piano on "If Only" and "I Don't Wish You Were Dead Anymore"
- Scott Reynolds - chorus vocals on "America (Wake Up Amy)"
- Parry Gripp: vocals on "America (Wake Up Amy)", gang vocals on "Only Young" and "Hooray for Beer"
- Zac Maloy - backing vocals on "Love Goes Boom"
- Teresa LaBarbera Whites - A&R
- Andy Somers - booking at The Agency Group
- Mike Swinford - management for Rainmaker Artists
- Mike McKoy - legal at Serling Rooks & Ferrara
- Album Photography by Jason Janik
- Peter McCabe, Brad Bond & Joshua Marc Levy - additional photography
- Joshua Marc Levy and Brad Bond - package art direction & design
- Steven Ray Brown - 15th Anniversary cake illustration

BFS crew

- Dave "Termite Dave" Hale - tour manager
- Tony "T-Ride" Gattone - guitar & bass tech
- Jacob "Pinky" Henry - stage manager, monitors, drum tech
- Blake Hunt - merch
- Wayne Neil - driver
- Sherman

== Charts ==
| Chart (2009) | Peak position |
|---|---|
| Scottish Albums (Official Charts) | 86 |
| UK Albums (Official Charts) | 84 |
| UK Album Downloads (Official Charts) | 76 |
| UK Independent Albums (Official Charts) | 13 |
| UK Physical Albums (OCC) | 82 |
| UK Rock & Metal Albums (Official Charts) | 4 |
| US Billboard 200 | 104 |
| US Top Rock Albums (Billboard) | 47 |

== Notes ==
- A Featured in frontman Jaret Reddick's fifth Bowling for Soup podcast, released January 15, 2010.
