= Really Really Happy =

Studio album by the Muffs
- Released: 2004
- Genre: Pop punk
- Length: 42:25
- Label: Sympathy for the Record Industry (LP), Oglio Records/Five Foot Two Records (CD)
- Producer: Kim Shattuck

The Muffs chronology
Alert Today, Alive Tomorrow (1999)	Really Really Happy (2004)	Whoop Dee Doo (2014)

Really Really Happy is the fifth album by the American pop punk band the Muffs, released in August 2004. The vinyl and CD releases have different cover art.

A remastered 2-disc Deluxe version, which included six bonus tracks and a 16-track set of demos, was released on May 13, 2022.

== Track listing ==
All tracks are written by Kim Shattuck

Original album
No.	Title	Length
1.	"Freak Out"	2:03
2.	"A Little Luxury"	2:16
3.	"Really Really Happy"	2:52
4.	"Something Inside"	2:01
5.	"Everybody Loves You"	2:12
6.	"Don't Pick On Me"	2:37
7.	"And I Go Pow"	2:38
8.	"My Lucky Day"	3:01
9.	"Fancy Girl"	2:39
10.	"How I Pass The Time"	2:35
11.	"Slow"	2:27
12.	"I'm Here I'm Not"	2:03
13.	"The Whole World"	3:22
14.	"My Awful Dream"	2:45
15.	"By My Side"	2:14
16.	"Oh Poor You"	1:33
17.	"The Story Of Me"	3:07

2022 Deluxe Edition CD Bonus tracks / 2022 Limited Edition Vinyl Reissue Bonus 7"
No.	Title	Length
18.	"My Whore"	1:55
19.	"Uh Oh"	2:06
20.	"Under The Covers In Jammies"	2:35
21.	"My Imagination"	2:53
22.	"Just The Beginning"	0:34
23.	"I Hate Gym"	1:24

Disc 2: New Improved Kim Shattuck Demos
No.	Title	Length
1.	"Really Really Happy"	2:55
2.	"Freak Out"	2:05
3.	"Everybody Loves You"	2:10
4.	"Something Inside"	1:57
5.	"And I Go Pow"	2:36
6.	"Don't Pick On Me"	2:35
7.	"The Story Of Me"	2:20
8.	"A Little Luxury"	2:15
9.	"By My Side"	2:11
10.	"Fancy Girl"	2:47
11.	"How I Pass The Time"	2:03
12.	"I'm Here I'm Not"	2:07
13.	"Even Now"	3:04
14.	"Slow"	2:19
15.	"My Lucky Day"	1:54
16.	"Oh Poor You"	1:27

Contents of the Deluxe Edition bonus disc were previously released separately on vinyl only for Record Store Day in April 2022.

== Personnel ==
The band's musical credits are described in the album's liner notes:

- Kim Shattuck – Guitar, vocals, harmonica
- Ronnie Barnett – Bass
- Roy McDonald – Drums, percussion

Ronnie Barnett is given additional credit for toy piano, and session musician Brian Kehew plays organ on "My Lucky Day". Background vocals are credited to Kevin Sutherland and Greg Saunders on "Don't Pick On Me", and to Kristen Shattuck on "My Lucky Day" and "Oh Poor You".

All tracks were produced and engineered by Kim Shattuck.
