= I Got It =

"I Got It" may refer to:

== Songs ==
- "I Got It", a song by Donnie Wahlberg featuring Aubrey O'Day
- "I Got It", a song by Gorilla Zoe featuring Big Block from Don't Feed da Animals
- "I Got It", a song by Ashanti from Braveheart
- "I Got It", a song by T-Pain from Epiphany
- "I Got It (Charli XCX song)", a song by Charli XCX featuring Brooke Candy, Cupcakke and Pabllo Vittar from Pop 2
- "I Got It (What You Need)", a song by Galactic

== See also ==
- I Get It (disambiguation)
- "I Got Id", a song by Pearl Jam featuring Neil Young from Merkin Ball
- Fascination (game), a variant of which is known as "I-Got-It"
