= No Holiday =

Studio album by the Muffs
- Released: October 18, 2019
- Length: 44:42
- Label: Omnivore
- Producer: Kim Shattuck

The Muffs chronology
Whoop Dee Doo (2014)	No Holiday (2019)

No Holiday is the seventh and final studio album by American punk rock band the Muffs. It was released on October 18, 2019, under Omnivore Recordings.

The album was the band's final release due to the death of lead vocalist Kim Shattuck on October 2, 2019.

== Critical reception ==
Professional ratings
Aggregate scores
Source	Rating
Metacritic	84/100
Review scores
Source	Rating
AllMusic	3.5/5 stars
Blurt	4/5 stars
Paste	7.9/10
Pitchfork	7.8/10

No Holiday was met with "universal acclaim" from critics. At Metacritic, which assigns a weighted average rating out of 100 to reviews from mainstream publications, this release received an average score of 84, based on 7 reviews.

=== Accolades ===
Accolades for No Holiday
Publication	Accolade	Rank
Good Morning America	Good Morning America's 50 Best Albums of 2019	25

== Track listing ==
All tracks are written by Kim Shattuck except "The Kids Have Gone Away" by Kim Shattuck/Roy McDonald.

No.	Title	Length
1.	"That's for Me"	0:38
2.	"Down Down Down"	1:33
3.	"No Holiday"	2:27
4.	"Earth Below Me"	2:02
5.	"A Lovely Day Boo Hoo"	4:14
6.	"Late and Sorry"	3:58
7.	"The Best"	1:18
8.	"Pollyanna"	1:31
9.	"Sick of This Old World"	2:47
10.	"To That Funny Place"	2:06
11.	"You Talk and You Talk"	3:16
12.	"Happier Just Being with You"	2:32
13.	"Lucky Charm"	2:00
14.	"On My Own"	3:53
15.	"Too Awake"	2:27
16.	"Insane"	2:30
17.	"The Kids Have Gone Away"	3:19
18.	"Sky"	2:11

== Personnel ==
Musicians

- Kim Shattuck – vocals, guitar, producer
- Ronnie Barnett – bass, vocals
- Roy McDonald – drums, percussion
- Adam Schary – guitars on 2, 3, 4, 5, 8, 9, 12, 15, 16, 17
- Kristian Hoffman – keyboard on 11
- Melanie Vammen – organ on 8
- Kristen Shattuck – backing vocals on 4
- Karen Basset – backing vocals on 9, 12, 15, 16, 17

Production

- Greg Allen – design
- Karen Basset – engineer
- Ailin G. Caraballo – photographer
- Erik Eldenius – engineer
- Evan Frankfort – mixer
- Steve Holroyd – engineer
- Brad Vance – mastering

== Charts ==
Chart performance for No Holiday
Chart (2019)	Peak position
US Independent Albums (Billboard)	35
