= Hawks (band) =

- Hawks 1981 - from left to right: Larry Adams, Kirk Kaufman, Dave Steen, Dave Hearn and Frank Wiewel

Background information
- Origin: Fort Dodge & Otho IA, USA
- Genres: Power pop, rock
- Years active: 1979–1982
- Labels: Columbia Records; Not Lame Recordings

Hawks was a power pop group based in the Fort Dodge, Iowa area from 1979 to 1982. The band consisted of Dave Hearn (keyboards, vocals), Larry Adams (drums), Frank Wiewel (bass, lead vocals), Kirk Kaufman (guitar, vocals) and Dave Steen (guitar, vocals). They released two albums on Columbia Records - Hawks (rel. 3/81, NJC 36922) and 30 Seconds Over Otho (rel. 7/82, ARC 38058) − while they were together. A third album, Perfect World Radio (Not Lame Recordings), was released posthumously and was made up of tracks the group had been working on after the second album's release. A cassette-only release entitled Hawks III (JR-2) was also made available on the Junior's Motel imprint. Hawks was, at the time of their signing with Columbia, the first group to be signed on the strength of an unsolicited demo. The group disbanded after being dropped from Columbia each going their separate ways. In 2007, Hawks was inducted into the Iowa Rock and Roll Hall of Fame. Their name is an acronym.

== History ==
Frank Wiewel and Kirk Kaufman met during junior high school in Fort Dodge, Iowa, during the 1960s. This eventually led to the formation of the group West Minist’r, a popular group during the late 1960s to early 1970s. West Minist’r consisted of Wiewel (bass/vocals), Kaufman (guitar/vocals), Rusty Bell (guitar/vocals), Terry Dillon (keyboards/vocals 1968−69), Chuck Henderson (keyboards/bass 1969−72) and Dean Davis (drums 1968–71). Rick Schaeffer, Arnie Bode and Keith Brown replaced the members who left the group, remaining with the band until its demise in 1974. The group released three singles during their time together: "Bright Lights, Windy City" b/w "Carnival" - Razzberry Records SR 2957, "My Life" b/w "Mr. Fingers" - Magic Records KX 7432 and "Sister Jane" b/w "I Want You" (info unavailable). Kaufman, Wiewel, Keith Brown and Arnie Bode opened West Minist’r Sound in 1972. Housed in a brick chicken coop that the band had used for practice, this Tom Hidley-designed space was located on Kaufman's parent's farm outside of Otho, Iowa. The studio gained some notoriety with the visit of Brian Wilson and Spring, a group in which Wilson's wife, Marilyn, was a member. Phil Spector and Todd Rundgren had also expressed interest in the studio.

Wiewel, Kaufman and Brown continued writing and recording during the 1970s. By 1979 Wiewel had recorded several tracks that his wife encouraged him to send out to various record labels. The songs he sent out were a mixture of originals and some covers. One of the covers, Tell Her No, originally by The Zombies, caught the attention of Paul Atkinson, guitarist for the Zombies who at that time worked in Columbia Record's A&R department. He forwarded the cover to the A&R head, Gregg Geller. Close to the same time, former drummer for Blood Sweat & Tears, Bobby Colomby, who was working at Capitol Records, expressed an interest in the material Weiwel had sent. With both companies expressing interest, a showcase was the next step. The only problem was there was no band to play for either label. All five of the yet-to-be band members along with Brown had played on the demos that Wiewel had sent out. The showcase took place at West Minist’r Sound with Brown doing the mix on the recording console. After several more demos, they sealed the deal with Columbia. The only immediate stipulation made by Columbia was that the group's name be changed. Wiewel had sent the demos out using the name Nighthawks. Using the first letters of their last names, it was decided to just shorten the name to Hawks. According to Geller, to his knowledge Hawks is the first band to be signed by Columbia Records on the basis of an unsolicited demo.

== First Album ==
The group's first album was issued in March 1981 as simply Hawks, featuring a predominately yellow cover with 5 colored feathers on the cover − matching the number of members in the band. Tom Werman (Cheap Trick, Blue Öyster Cult, Ted Nugent) was the producer assigned to the band and Gary Ladinsky engineered. Right Away b/w Need Your Love (Columbia 11-60500) was released from the album. It rose to #63 on Billboard’s Hot 100 chart. Another song from the album - It’s All Right, It’s O.K. − went to #32 on Billboard's AOR chart. It was released as a single b/w Spend This Evening (Columbia 11-02086) in May 1981. A promo single of Lonely Nights (Columbia 18-2401) was released in July 1981, but never saw regular release. All members except Adams contributed songs to the album. I Want You, I Need You; written by Dave Cottrell, was the only outside composition.

The strength of the songwriting was mentioned in many reviews at the time. Steve Schnee, writing for AllMusic, said, "Four of the five members wrote and sang great pop tunes that could have had wider appeal if this album had just received some airplay." Schnee felt they were just a bit too in between rock and pop/new wave to grab more listeners. He opined the lack of promotion contributed to holding the group back from the heights they may have otherwise attained. The Philadelphia Inquirer considered the album "an impressive debut". Surprisingly, the album and single did not get as much airplay in their home state as one might imagine, though it did well on the East Coast as well as in the Southwest. Werman, writing for PopDose about what he considers his greatest misses, briefly mentions recording this album in Otho and that to him, at times, this group sounded very much like the Beatles. Two standouts for Werman were Let Me In and The Admiral's Mutiny. High Fidelity's Steven X. Rea, comparing the group to the Raspberries and Cheap Trick, said Hawks epitomizes what he considers American power pop. He points out I Want You, I Need You - shimmering with a "pseudo-Anglo-pop sheen" - and Lonely Nights - as "energetic teenage elan" - being excellent examples from the group in the magazines New Acts/Spin Offs column.

== 30 Seconds Over Otho ==
Hawks released their second album in June 1982, 15 months after their initial release. The release was noted in Billboard's New LP/Tape Releases column on June 19, 1982. This effort was produced by John Ryan, with the band being given co-production credits for all but three of the cuts. Again, all members aside from Adams contributed songs to the effort. Another similarity to the first album was the inclusion of one outside composition - Call on Me by Hanno Harders and Holger Kopp. In the credits on the inner sleeve it is noted that, aside from recording being done at Sound City Studios, tracks were recorded at West Minist’r Sound in Otho. Clarence Clemons guests on the Steen song (If We Just) Stick Together, released as a single b/w Black and White (Columbia, 11-02955).

Writing for AllMusic (which gave the album 4.5 stars out of five), Steve Schnee posted that this album "is as close as you're going to get to a perfect commercial pop album." He offers the opinion that nearly every song could have been a hit and points specifically to (If We Just) Stick Together as one that should have been a huge one. He also noted the split among power pop enthusiasts as to which album was the best release by the group at that point. In his opinion this album was more consistent and confident. The album made an appearance in Billboard's Top Single Picks column on July 3, 1982, noting that ". . . Hawks is capable of producing some haunting melodies as on the Beatlesesque Listen to Her Sing and can also rock with the best of them." The album appeared the next week in Billboard's Recommended LPs column, making mention of their teaming with John Ryan. For whatever reason, this sophomore effort did not receive the same push from Columbia as the debut release.

== Beyond 1982 ==
Hawks had a chance to tour in support of the second album, but chose instead to concentrate on a third album for Columbia, which was never released due to the group being dropped from the label. During that period the group were involved in some limited live performance. They had opened for Joan Jett and had also appeared with Head East in concert.

The purposed third album was to be more of a concept album, according to Kaufman. The band had planned to continue recording at West Minist’r as opposed to a studio in LA or New York as there were fewer distractions in Otho. A cassette-only release − Hawks III − was put out on the Junior’s Motel label (JR-2). Perfect World Radio, perhaps a more official third album, was released on August 27, 2003 by Not Lame Recordings. While this CD is currently out of print, the music can be accessed at iTunes. This contained almost all the songs from Hawks III missing only Streets Are Dancing, When It All Comes Down and Somebody’s Gonna Cry, adding additional songs not on the cassette release (see discography). On the whole, Gary Glauber, writing for PopMatters, declared PWR to be "a delightful showcase of their talents as pop songwriters". Matt Collar, writing on this album at AllMusic, gave the album 4.5 stars out of 5, and echoed his colleague's sentiments in the earlier review of Hawks, opining that the band was "too quirky and intelligent for mainstream radio and conversely too slick for the underground of college rock." He also notes that the band participated in the compilation of this album.

In 2007 Hawks was inducted into the Iowa Rock and Roll Hall of Fame.

Dave Steen found some success as a songwriter. Ringo Starr, Maria Muldaur and Son Seals are among the artists that have recorded songs he has written. After his deal with Warner Chappell Music ended, he began work in an executive position with a magazine based in Nebraska. Kaufman continues to run Junior's Motel (as the former West Minist’r Sound is now known) as well as having performed with several musical entities – Junior's Army, H and K, and HipKnosis (which included Hearn). He was inducted for a 4th time into the Iowa Rock and Roll Hall of Fame in 2013. He also received this honor as a member of West Minist’r in 2002, 2006 for West Minist’r Sound and in 2007 for Hawks. Wiewel is involved with People Against Cancer. He was also inducted into the Iowa Rock and Roll Hall of Fame in 2002 for being a member of West Minist’r. In 2016, Wiewel and Brown released "The Road Not Traveled" which consists of 8 original songs by the duo. Dave Hearn owns Silhouette Media in Fort Dodge, Iowa and has recorded 11 solo albums in his home studio. He was a member of HipKnosis with Kaufman and has also been a part time optician for over 30 years. After the band separated Adams worked as a plumbing contractor in Texas along with doing 3 stints as an independent contractor in Iraq.

On Saturday July 8, 2017 all of the members of the group got back together for the first time since 1982 to take part in Shellabration which is held yearly at the Rogers Sports Complex in Ft. Dodge. They were one of two opening acts scheduled to open for the headliner, Huey Lewis and the News. This was also the second time Hawks had appeared on the same bill with Lewis and his group - the first being when both bands appeared on American Bandstand in 1980.

== Discography ==
Hawks - Columbia Records, NJC 36922, released 3/81

SIDE 1
It's All Right, It's Okay - Hearn
I Want You, I Need You - Dave Cottrell
Right Away - Steen
Lonely Nights - Wiewel
Let Me In - Kaufman

SIDE 2
Need Your Love - Kaufman
American Girls - Hearn
The Admiral's Mutiny - Hearn
Spend This Evening - Kaufman
Dancing in the Shadows - Hearn

Produced by Tom Werman. Engineered by Gary Ladinsky. This album was released with at least two different inner sleeve versions - generic white and printed blue graphics on white.

30 Seconds Over Otho - Columbia Records, ARC 38058, released 7/82
SIDE 1
Tonight You Are Mine* - Steen/Kaufman
Somewhere in the Night - Hearn
(If We Just) Stick Together* - Steen
Nobody Loses Tonight* - Steen
Angel* - Kaufman

SIDE 2
The Great Divide* - Hearn
Don't Walk Away* - Hearn
Black and White* - Wiewel/Steen
Listen to Her Sing - Steen
Call On Me - Harders/Kopp

Produced by John Ryan. *Co-produced by Hawks. Recorded and Mixed in Los Angeles by Mark Smith, Sound City Studios. Assisted by Bruce Barris and Rick Palakow. Recorded in Iowa by Kirk Kaufman, Frank Wiewel and Rick Hope, West Minist’r Sound, Otho. Mastered at Kendun by Jeff Sanders. Clarence Clemons: sax on "Stick Together".

Hawks III - Junior's Motel, JR-2, released on cassette only
SIDE 1
Pretty Promises
Pride
Cold Grey Part of the World
Roxanne
Only Love is Real

SIDE 2
Streets Are Dancing
When It All Comes Down
Somebody's Gonna Cry
The Show is Over

Recorded at Junior's Motel, Otho, Iowa. Engineered by Kirk Kaufman

Perfect World Radio - Not Lame Recordings, released 27 August 2003
I'm Alive
Only Love Is Real
Laughing
Roxanne
Goodbye California
Cold Gray Part of the World
Pretty Promises
Living Inside Your Love
That's Right
I Don't Understand It
You Can't Do Any Better Than That
The Show Is Over
Pride
Right Away (demo version)
Need Your Love (demo version)
It's O.K., It's All Right (demo version)
Note: This is the way the above title for this track is displayed by Muze, Inc. Also, Muze identifies Larry Adams as Dolor Larry Adams
