= Gilly's =

American music venue

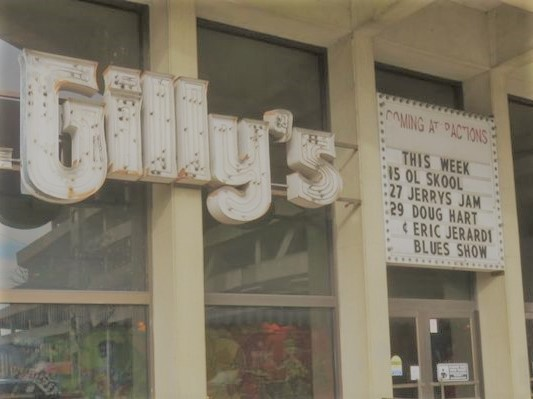
- Address: 131 S. Jefferson St. (Closed); Dayton, Ohio; United States
- Owner: Jerry Gillotti
- Capacity: 250
- Type: Concert venue

Construction
- Opened: 1972
- Closed: 2018
- Years active: 1972–2018

Gilly's was a 250-seat music venue in Dayton, Ohio, mainly hosting jazz and blues music, which opened in July 1972 and closed on New Years' morning in January 2018.

== History ==
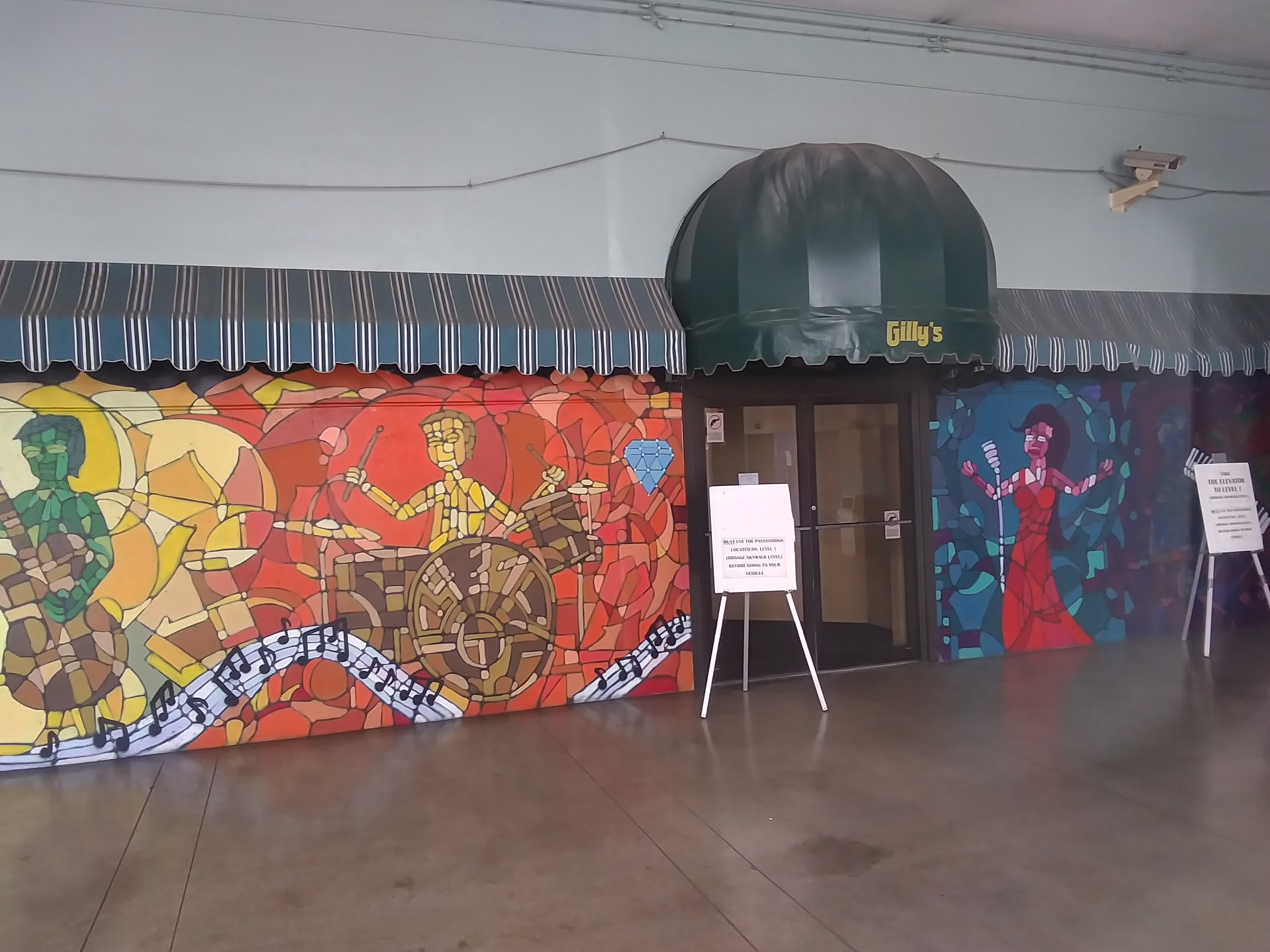

Founder and owner Jerry Gillotti began presenting live music in 1969 when he opened his first business, Jerry Gillotti's Wedgewood Inn on Patterson Road in Dayton. In 1972, Gilly's opened at 801 North Main Street. The club was briefly located inside the Dayton Inn at Third & Ludlow before moving to its last location at 131 S. Jefferson Street in downtown Dayton catacorner across from the Dayton Convention Center in 1976.

== Artists ==
Gilly's was notable for hosting a wide range of national performers during the club's 45-year tenure including Roy Meriwether who performed the club's opening show, George Benson, B.B. King, Herbie Hancock, Tony Bennett, Art Blakey, Charles Mingus, Bobby Blue Bland, Wynton Marsalis, Stan Getz, Stevie Ray Vaughan, and Roy Ayers.

Several touring acts made multiple stops at Gilly's such as pianists Alex Bugnon, Bill Cunliffe, jazz saxophonist Marion Meadows, and Kevin Toney, a former member of jazz group The Blackbyrds. Blues guitarists Albert Collins, and Piney Brown, as regulars. New Orleans horn players Joe "King" Oliver and Louis Armstrong were celebrated at a Cityfolk jazz concert in 2012 at Gilly's.

Before his death in 1979 the R&B singer Donny Hathaway performed sold-out shows in 1976 and 1977 when the club was inside the Dayton Inn at 3rd & Ludlow.

In his 2017 autobiography, Good Things Happen Slowly: A Life In and Out of Jazz, pianist Fred Hersch, a Cincinnati, Ohio native, talks about seeing Sun Ra and his Intergalactic Arkestra at Gilly's. Hersch recalls being in the audience when bandleader Art Pepper kicked the hired pianist off the stand and asked if there was anyone in the audience who could join. Hersch offered, and played.

All About Jazz columnist Michael J. Williams wrote about an altercation with Charles Mingus and pianist Don Pullen in the early 1970s, "One of the wonderful things about live jazz in clubs, and that goes for Gilly's, is the ever-present possibility of the unexpected".

In addition to jazz, Gilly's hosted a tribute show to David Bowie. The show was organized by Shelly Hulce, with JJ Parkey performing as Ziggy Stardust. Other Dayton musicians include Todd the Fox, drummer Tyler Trent of the band Brainiac, and Tod Weidner of the Motel Beds. Performer Eric Zadan who toured with national artists and led bands also mentored jazz students at Dayton's Jazz Arts Studio Zadan. Blues and rock musician Doug Hart of the Doug Hart Band has played over 20 to 25 shows at Gilly's. Floyd Weatherspoon's R&B band Touch has played Valentine's weekend show at Gilly's for 20 consecutive years. National rock and pop recording acts from Dayton The Amps and Guided by Voices made appearances in the 1990s.

Gilly's became the first club in Dayton to ban smoking, in 2004.
