= Joe Senser =

American football player (1956–2026)

No. 81
- Position: Tight end

Personal information
- Born: August 18, 1956; Philadelphia, Pennsylvania, U.S.
- Died: May 7, 2026 (aged 69); Maple Plain, Minnesota, U.S.
- Listed height: 6 ft 4 in (1.93 m)
- Listed weight: 235 lb (107 kg)

Career information
- High school: Milton Hershey School (Hershey, Pennsylvania)
- College: West Chester
- NFL draft: 1979: 6th round, 152nd overall pick

Career history
- Minnesota Vikings (1980–1984)

Awards and highlights
- Pro Bowl (1981)

Career NFL statistics
- Receptions: 165
- Receiving yards: 1,822
- Receiving touchdowns: 16
- Stats at Pro Football Reference

Joseph Spence Senser (August 18, 1956 – May 7, 2026) was an American professional football player who was a tight end for the Minnesota Vikings of the National Football League (NFL). He played college football for the West Chester Golden Rams and was selected by the Vikings in the sixth round of the 1979 NFL draft.

Senser earned a berth in the Pro Bowl after the 1981 season. He played in all 16 games in 1981, setting career highs in receptions (79), yards (1,004), yards per catch (12.7) and touchdowns (8). A serious knee injury forced Senser to miss the entire 1983 NFL season, but he returned in 1984.

== Biography ==
Senser was a 1974 graduate of the Milton Hershey School, a home for underprivileged children and the prime benefactor of Milton Hershey's legacy. At West Chester University, he also played collegiately for the Golden Rams basketball team. In 1976–77, his .699 field goal percentage led all of NCAA Division I college basketball. It set the then-NCAA record for field goal percentage, breaking the previous mark of .667 held by Kareem Abdul-Jabbar, Kent Martens and Al Fleming.

He was the color commentator for Minnesota Vikings Radio Network in 1993–94 and from 2001 to 2006. He was hired by WCCO Radio to be the color commentator for University of St. Thomas football (NCAA Division III) broadcasts beginning in 2011.

Senser was part owner of Joe Senser's Restaurant & Sports Theater which had 4 locations in Bloomington, Eagan, Plymouth and Roseville, Minnesota. All locations are now closed. He was married with four daughters and one granddaughter. One of his daughters is singer Brittani Senser.

On August 23, 2011, a Mercedes SUV registered to Senser was involved in a fatal hit-and-run accident near the Augsburg University campus in Minneapolis. On September 2, 2011, the Senser family's attorney released a statement that "the driver in this incident was Ms. Amy Senser", who was his wife. She was convicted of felony criminal vehicular homicide and sentenced to forty-one months in prison.

In May 2016, the state attorney general asked the Hershey Trust Company to remove Senser and two other long-serving board members. The attorney general cited "apparent violations" by the firm of a previous agreement to reform.

On November 26, 2016, WCCO television news reported that Senser was undergoing physical therapy for a stroke suffered earlier in the year.

Senser died on May 7, 2026, at the age of 69.
