= Whoop Dee Doo (album) =

Studio album by the Muffs
- Released: July 22, 2014
- Genre: Punk rock
- Length: 37:06
- Label: Burger

The Muffs chronology
Really Really Happy (2004)	Whoop Dee Doo (2014)	No Holiday (2019)

Professional ratings
Aggregate scores
Source	Rating
Metacritic	76/100
Review scores
Source	Rating
AllMusic	4/5 stars
Consequence of Sound	B
Pitchfork	7.5/10.0

Whoop Dee Doo is the sixth studio album by American punk rock band the Muffs and their final album to be released in Kim Shattuck’s lifetime. It was released in July 2014 under Burger Records. Ten years had elapsed since The Muffs' previous album Really Really Happy was released. The album received positive reviews.

== Track listing ==
All tracks are written by Kim Shattuck

No.	Title	Length
1.	"Weird Boy Next Door"	3:05
2.	"Paint by Numbers"	2:30
3.	"Like You Don't See Me"	3:07
4.	"Take a Take a Me"	3:37
5.	"Up and Down Around"	3:59
6.	"Where Did I Go Wrong"	2:09
7.	"Cheezy"	3:48
8.	"Forget the Day"	2:29
9.	"I Get It"	2:56
10.	"Because You're Sad"	2:58
11.	"Lay Down"	3:51
12.	"Forever"	2:37
Total length:		37:06

== Personnel ==
The Muffs

- Kim Shattuck - composition, engineer, guitar, photography, producer, lead vocals
- Ronnie Barnett - bass, lead vocals
- Roy McDonald - drums, percussion

Other personnel

- Pat Broderick - design
- Tommi Cahill - photography
- Evan Frankfort - mixing
- Kristian Hoffman - keyboard
- Steve Holroyd - engineer
- Kristen Shattuck - backing vocals
- Keith Slettedahl - backing vocals
- Brad Vance - mastering
- Martin Wong - photography
