= Brittani Senser =

American singer-songwriter

- Born: April 11, 1984 (age 42)
- Origin: Minneapolis, Minnesota, U.S.
- Genres: country, R&B
- Occupation: Singer-songwriter
- Instrument: Vocals
- Years active: 2007–2012
- Labels: MN Finest Records, Bungalo, Universal Records

Brittani Senser (born April 11, 1984) is a former American pop and R&B artist. She is from Minneapolis, Minnesota. She released her debut album, After Love, in July 2009.

== Background ==
Senser was born and raised in Minneapolis, Minnesota. Her father, Joe Senser, played for the Minnesota Vikings in the 1980s and formerly owned a chain of sports bar-restaurants around the Twin Cities.

Senser auditioned for MTV's Making the Band 3 in 2005. Senser made it to the finals in New York, but she did not make the final cut for the show.

Senser cites Whitney Houston, Lauryn Hill, Gladys Knight and Anita Baker as influences, and Beyoncé Knowles as her role model.

On April 24, 2012, Senser testified in her stepmother Amy Senser's trial for the criminal vehicular homicide of Minneapolis chef Anousone Phanthavong. According to Brittani Senser's testimony, Amy Senser only publicly admitted to having driven the Mercedes-Benz which struck and killed Phanthavong (as he filled his stalled vehicle with gasoline on the side of the Riverside exit off of Interstate 94) after Brittani Senser was mentioned as a potential suspect.

She had a child named Aria Burch Senser in 2005. Aria Joy "Buggy" Burch-Senser died from suicide on February 6, 2019, according to an obituary in the Minneapolis Star Tribune.

== Discography ==
Senser co-wrote most of the songs on her debut album, After Love. Bobby Valentino joined her for a duet on "Piece of Me", and David Banner is featured on the track "Rock Steady." To celebrate the release of the album, Khloé Kardashian hosted a CD release party for Senser at Kress in Hollywood on Friday, July 31, 2009.

== "After Love" music video ==
The music video for the song "After Love" features Levi Johnston. In the video, Johnston plays a character who is persecuted by the overbearing mother of his girlfriend, portrayed by Senser. In the video's storyline, Johnston and Senser act like a couple, causing speculation as to whether they are dating in real life. Johnston brought Senser as his date to the Teen Choice Awards on August 8, 2010 and celebrity gossip referred to Senser several times as Johnston's "new gal pal".
