= The Muffs (album) =

Studio album by the Muffs
- Released: 1993
- Genres: Pop-punk; punk rock; garage rock; pop rock
- Length: 41:05
- Label: Warner Bros.
- Producers: Rob Cavallo; David Katznelson; the Muffs

The Muffs chronology
The Muffs (1993)	Blonder and Blonder (1995)

The Muffs is the debut album by American pop punk band the Muffs, released in 1993 on Warner Bros. Records. It contains the singles "Lucky Guy" and "Big Mouth". "Stupid Jerk" is a cover of the Angry Samoans song. In 2015, the album was remastered and expanded by Omnivore Recordings, featuring 11 additional tracks, 9 of which were previously unreleased.

== Critical reception ==
Professional ratings
Review scores
Source	Rating
AllMusic	4.5/5 stars
Blurt	4/5 stars
Robert Christgau	(2-star Honorable Mention)
Entertainment Weekly	B+
Punknews.org	4.5/5 stars

The Washington Post said that "the Muffs mostly play a style of rootsy pop-rock that's been making the rounds in Southern California for some 15 years."

AllMusic wrote: "There's a certain charm to the group's 3-chord riffing and primitive rhythms that seems to have most appeal when driving a vehicle beyond the posted speed limit on a hot, sunny day. But stretched over 16 tracks, the forced minimalism begins to wane in appeal."

== Track listing ==
All tracks written by Kim Shattuck, except where noted

1. "Lucky Guy" – 2:46
2. "Saying Goodbye" – 2:16
3. "Everywhere I Go" – 3:12
4. "Better Than Me" – 2:48
5. "From Your Girl" – 3:27
6. "Not Like Me" – 3:08
7. "Baby Go Round" – 2:47
8. "North Pole" (Barnett) – 0:35
9. "Big Mouth" – 1:51
10. "Every Single Thing" – 2:22
11. "Don't Waste Another Day" – 2:35
12. "Stupid Jerk" (Mike Saunders; Angry Samoans cover) – 0:31
13. "Another Day" – 2:16
14. "Eye to Eye" (Shattuck, Vammen) – 3:30
15. "I Need You" (Barnett, Shattuck) – 3:41
16. "All for Nothing" – 3:20

=== 2015 Omnivore Recordings remastered and expanded release ===
1. "Lucky Guy" – 2:46
2. "Saying Goodbye" – 2:16
3. "Everywhere I Go" – 3:12
4. "Better Than Me" – 2:48
5. "From Your Girl" – 3:27
6. "Not Like Me" – 3:08
7. "Baby Go Round" – 2:47
8. "North Pole" (Barnett) – 0:35
9. "Big Mouth" – 1:51
10. "Every Single Thing" – 2:22
11. "Don't Waste Another Day" – 2:35
12. "Stupid Jerk" (Mike Saunders) – 0:31
13. "Another Day" – 2:16
14. "Eye to Eye" (Shattuck, Vammen) – 3:30
15. "I Need You" (Barnett, Shattuck) – 3:41
16. "All for Nothing" – 3:20
17. "Lucky Guy" (Radio Remix) – 2:48
18. "Everywhere I Go" (Cassette Version) – 3:13
19. "All for Nothing" (4-Track Demo)* – 2:45
20. "Do You Want Her" (4-Track Demo)* – 3:18
21. "I Don't Expect It" (4-Track Demo)* – 2:16
22. "My Face" (4-Track Demo)* – 2:37
23. "Something on My Mind" (4-Track Demo)* – 2:05
24. "Ethyl My Love" (4-Track Demo)* – 2:31
25. "Not Like Me" (4-Track Demo)* – 3:09
26. "Saying Goodbye to Phil" (4-Track Demo)* – 3:03
27. (Unlisted Hidden Track - Phone Message)* – 2:24

*previously unreleased. Track 27 is an unlisted hidden track of a phone recording that co-producer David Katznelson had left on Muffs singer Kim Shattuck's answering machine.

== Personnel ==
- Kim Shattuck – lead guitar, vocals
- Ronnie Barnett – bass
- Melanie Vammen – rhythm guitar
- Criss Crass – drums
- Korla Pandit – organ
- Rob Cavallo – producer
- David Katznelson – producer
- The Muffs – producer
- Brian Kehew – recording engineer
