= L'Assassins =

US musical group

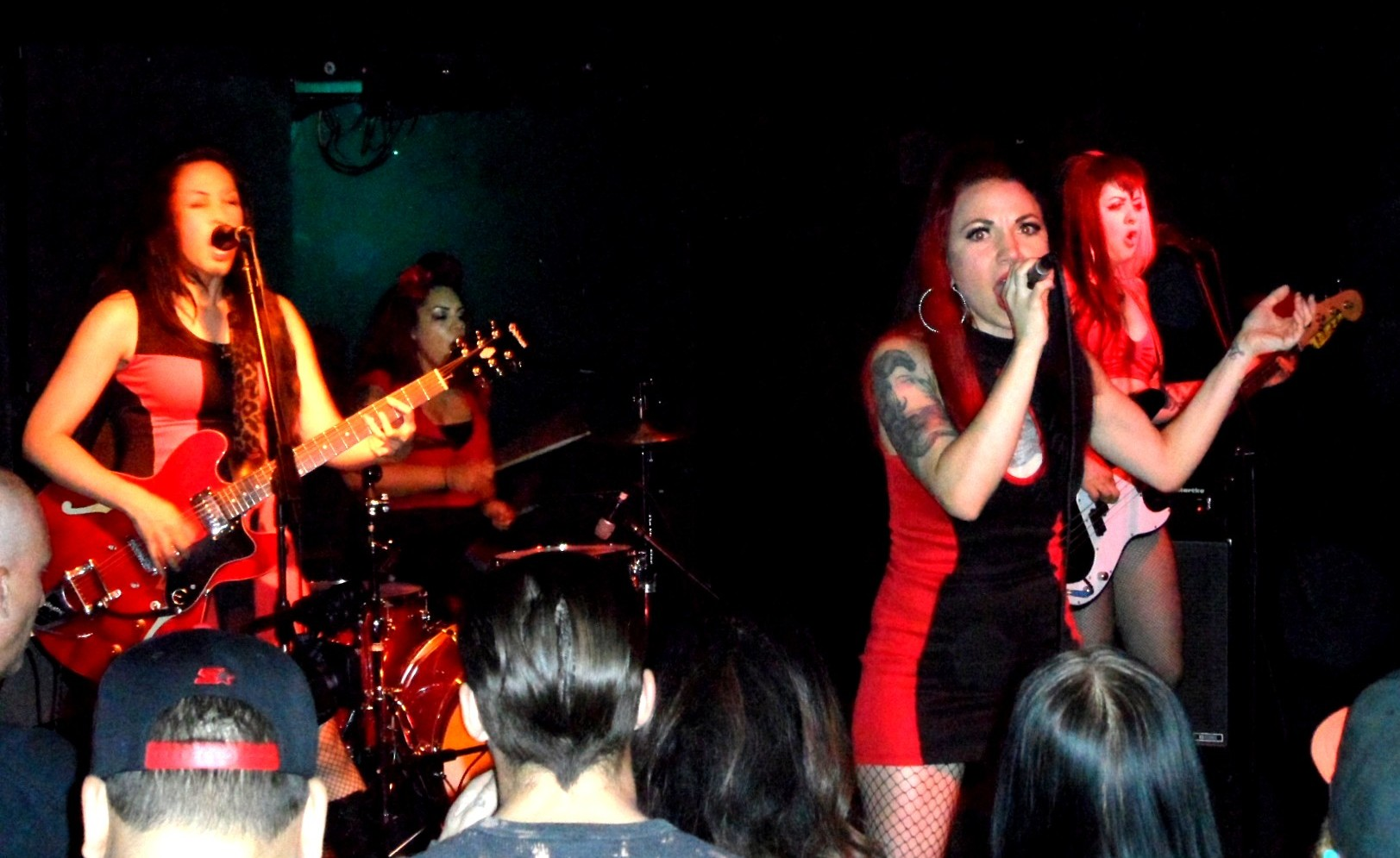
- L'Assassins in Chicago 2014

Background information
- Origin: Minneapolis, Minnesota
- Genres: Rockabilly, surf, garage rock
- Years active: 2010-2015
- Labels: Big Action Records, Piñata Records
- Members: Tea Ann Simpson; Monet Wong; Ariel Dornbush; Angela Clark
- Website: Facebook

L'Assassins was a surf/garage rock band from Minneapolis, Minnesota, that formed in 2010 and has released three EPs, toured in Europe and played several festivals, including the "Girls Got Rhythm" festival and the "Memory Lanes Block Party". The band members have previously played with artists such as XOXO Judy, the Shortcuts, and Brittani Senser and have a "common love of bad ass rock'n'roll, big hair, and sassitude!"

== History ==
The band formed in late 2010 and played their first show in April 2011. They originally performed without a name before eventually settling on the name L'Assassins, a name which they describe as being not grammatically correct in any language.

Lead singer Tea Simpson is a fan of rockabilly, punk rock and outlaw country, she is also influenced by old B movies such as Faster, Pussycat! Kill! Kill! and Vixen!. The band is influenced by artists such as The Cramps, Thee Headcoatees and The Sonics.

The band was last active in 2015. In 2016, Ariel Dornbush and Monet Wong started a new band, with Madalyn Mae on drums, called The Toxenes.

== Reception ==
- "a quartet of buxom women with a mean look about them and an even meaner, vintage rockabilly sound." (Chris Riemenschneider, Star Tribune)
- "Taking cues from Suzi Quatro, Dum Dum Girls and Joan Jett, L'Assassins have created a series of propulsive songs that exude confidence." (Jon Schober, Andrea Swensson, 89.3 The Current)
- "The four women from Minneapolis featured a throwback vibe in sound and dress. Chugging, rockabilly rhythms, colorful tattoos, sharp guitar, and flowers in hair proved a perfect match for the club. Singer Tee Ann Simpson connected with the crowd with her irrepressible energy." (Dave Miller, Chicago Concert Goers)
- "this foursome brings an edgy style and even edgier sound to our music scene." (DeDe Ruger, MN Ups Magazine>

== Members ==
- Tea Ann Simpson — Vocals
- Monet Wong — Guitar/Vocals
- Ariel Dornbush — Bass/Vocals
- Angela Clark — Drums/Vocals

== Discography ==
=== Singles ===
- "7pm", "Go" b/w "Backseat Bomp" 2012
- "Fire of Love" b/w "Liar" 2015

=== EPs ===
- L'Assassins 2012
- Lovin' On The Run 2013
- Kill Kill Kill! Bang Bang Bang! 2014

=== Videos ===
- "Backseat Bomp" 2012
- "Gonna Git That Man" 2012
- L'Assassins in "Dressed To Kill: Tonight The devil dances in hell!" 2012
- "Lovin' On The Run" 2013
- "Psycho Beach" 2014
- "Fire of Love" 2015
