= The Amps =

American alternative rock band

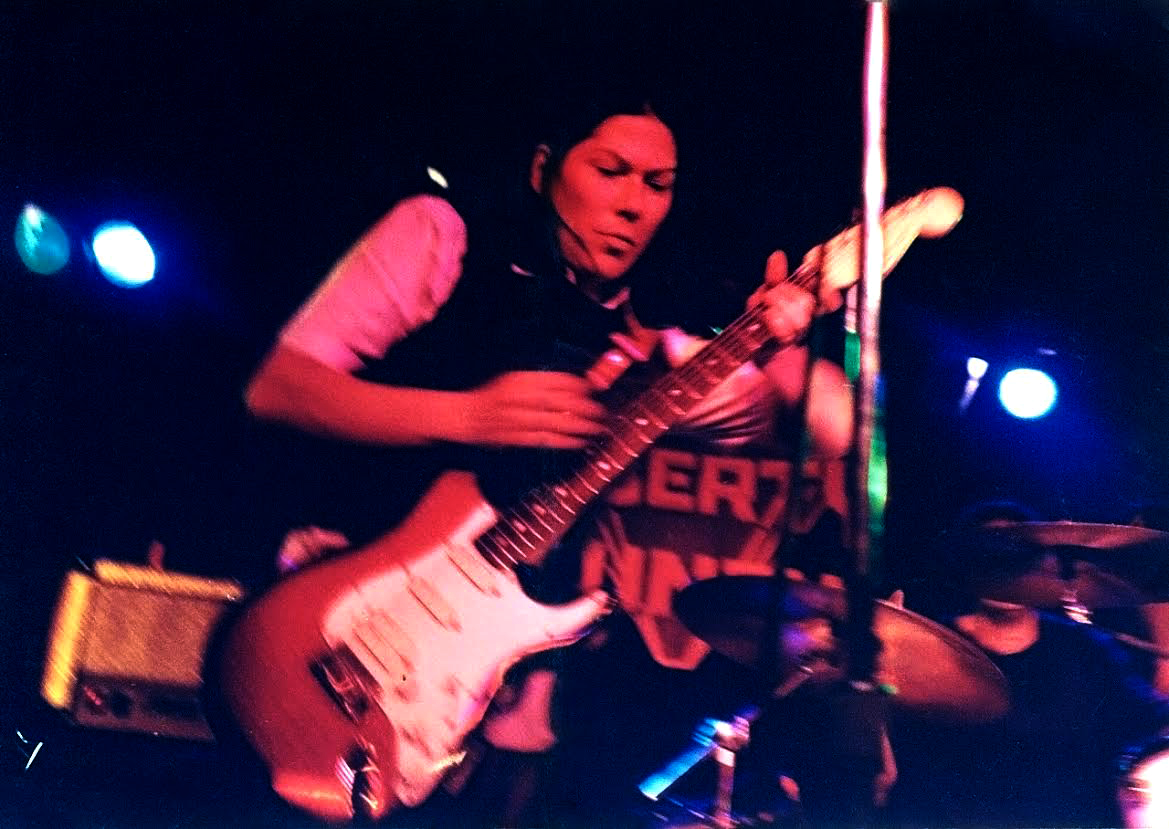
- Kim Deal performing with the Amps in Dayton, Ohio in 1995

Background information
- Origin: Dayton, Ohio, U.S.
- Genres: Alternative rock, lo-fi
- Years active: 1995–1996
- Labels: 4AD; Elektra
- Past members: Kim Deal; Kelley Deal; Nate Farley; Luis Lerma; Jim Macpherson

The Amps were an American alternative rock band formed by Kim Deal in 1995, while her band the Breeders went on hiatus. The group consisted of Deal, on lead vocals and rhythm guitar; Luis Lerma on bass; Nate Farley on lead guitar; and Jim Macpherson of the Breeders on drums. Kelley Deal, Kim's sister, was also briefly involved, but had to leave the band due to drug problems. The group was named when Kim Deal started calling herself Tammy Ampersand for fun, and the band Tammy and the Amps. They recorded the album Pacer in the United States and Ireland.

Pacer was released in October 1995. The group toured the United States, Europe, and Australia with bands including the Foo Fighters, Sonic Youth, and Guided by Voices. Critics commented on the loose and rough quality of these performances. The Amps continued as a group until 1996, when Deal changed their name back to the Breeders. By 2000, Macpherson, Lerma, and Farley had left the band; Macpherson and Farley were at times involved in various projects with Guided by Voices' Robert Pollard. Deal's next album, the Breeders' Title TK, was released seven years after Pacer.

== Background and formation ==
From 1986 to 1992, Deal was a member of the Pixies and from 1989 onwards, the Breeders. In August 1993, the Breeders released their second album, Last Splash which went platinum in the USA, gold in Canada, and silver in the UK. The other members of the group at that time were Kim's twin sister Kelley Deal, Josephine Wiggs and Jim Macpherson. By late 1994, after two years of straight touring and recording, and culminating in the Lollapalooza tour, the band members were exhausted; they decided to take some time off from the Breeders, but this hiatus ended up being longer than expected. Kelley was arrested on drug charges in late 1994 and spent time in and out of rehabilitation, while Wiggs became involved in musical projects in New York, including collaborations with members of Luscious Jackson.

Meanwhile, Kim Deal was eager to continue recording and performing. At first she envisioned her next album as a solo record, on which she would play all of the instrument parts. When she was recording initial demos for the project, she asked Kelley to play on some of them, to distract her from her drug difficulties. Since Kelley was now also involved, Deal decided not to go solo, but formed a new group. She recruited Macpherson to play drums, musician Luis Lerma, bass, and Nate Farley, guitar. Later, Kelley dropped out of the project for rehabilitation and moved to Saint Paul, Minnesota. For fun, Deal began calling herself Tammy Ampersand, and the group, Tammy and the Amps. This became simply the Amps.

== Recording and touring ==
The Amps released one album, Pacer which was recorded at several different studios. The first session, at Easley Studios in Memphis was engineered by Davis McCain and Doug Easley. Deal recorded new songs there including what would become Pacer's single, "Tipp City". While she was producing an upcoming record by Guided by Voices she had a recording opportunity; when the group abandoned work on their album, Deal used the leftover studio time for her own songs. Following the Easley Studios session, recording for Pacer continued at six other locations in total, including studios in Chicago, Los Angeles, Dublin, and Deal's hometown of Dayton. Deal frequently found herself at odds with engineers, as she had "gotten used to the gain structure on the 4-track" while making the demos for the band in her basement. Engineers Steve Albini, John Agnello, Bryce Goggin, and others each helped record one or more of these sessions. While recording with Albini, the band drank barenjager; the honey liqueur spilled all over the studio, causing their shoes to stick to the floor.Pacer came out in October 1995.

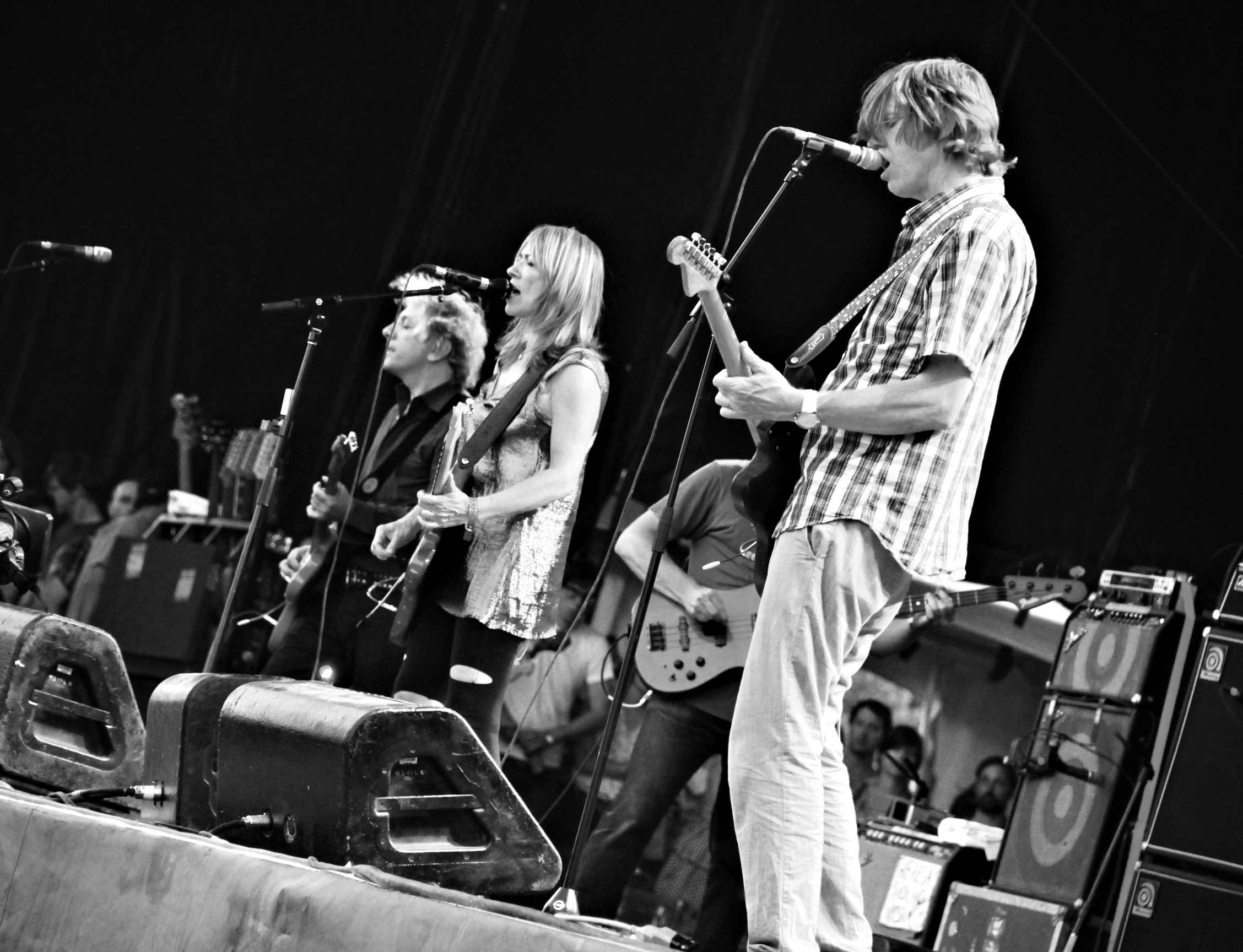
The Amps toured with Sonic Youth in late 1995.

The Amps toured throughout 1995 and 1996. Early performances, before releasing Pacer, included June–July 1995 shows in Dayton: one with Guided by Voices at Gilly's and another with Poster Children. They toured with Guided by Voices and Chavez in the United Kingdom in September, in cities such as Sheffield, Glasgow, Brighton, and London; Chrissie Hynde of the Pretenders attended the London concert as a birthday present to herself, and afterwards came backstage to meet Deal. The Amps played another show with Guided by Voices in Ohio in October. The Amps performed a series of US concerts in October and November with Sonic Youth, among which were shows in Detroit and Chicago with Helium, in Seattle and Portland with Bikini Kill, and in Los Angeles with Mike Watt and Sonic Youth. Following the concerts with Sonic Youth, the Amps did a tour of Europe, including a performance in London on December 7. In January 1996, they played the Summersault festival in Australia. That year, the Amps toured with the Foo Fighters in the United States, in locations such as Chicago (with That Dog), Worcester, Massachusetts, and Austin, Texas (with Jawbreaker), as well as playing one more concert with Guided By Voices, in early March in Newport, Kentucky. At this show, Deal had a permanent falling-out with Robert Pollard when Guided By Voices unintentionally used up all the soundcheck time. In 1995 or 1996, they also played shows with the Tasties and Brainiac.

Reviewers described live concerts by the Amps as unpolished and relaxed. The Chronicle's Drema Crist praised their show at an unidentified location as "fun-spirited and silly". Greg Kot of The Chicago Tribune described one of their Chicago performances as "off-kilter" and wrote that "Deal's pungent vocals were swallowed up by the guitars, and the foursome's slight melodies were lost amid all the bashing." A review in The Chicago Reader of the same concert noted that "The Amps play with a low-key, hangout sound." The Phoenix's Matt Ashare felt that at their December 1995 show in Boston "the Amps didn't click in a way that would suggest that this was Deal's new, full-time band"; he added that it was "an unpretentiously gritty way for Deal to let off some steam while the Breeders [took] a little break". In Boston Rock, this concert was characterized as "sloppy" but "charm[ing] ... hanging loosely off Kim's gruff vocals and ebullient personality".

== Reforming the Breeders ==
Later in 1996, Deal changed the name of the group back to the Breeders and the band originally had almost the same line-up as the Amps. Until then Deal had been waiting for Wiggs and Kelley to rejoin the Breeders and record a new album together, and had held back from reforming the Breeders out of respect for them. In May 1996, Wiggs revealed that she would not be involved in any immediate Breeders activity; Kelley also chose to stay in Saint Paul, to be close to her rehabilitation facility. Deal then decided that she did not want to wait any longer to reform the group, partly because the Breeders' repertoire was larger than the Amps', thereby allowing longer concerts. Deal added violinist Carrie Bradley (who had played on the Breeders' Pod album), and with Macpherson, Lerma, and Farley, played some shows in 1996 with Primus.

By 1998, Kelley had rejoined and Macpherson had left the group, and by 2000 Lerma and Farley had also left. With a line-up including the Deal sisters and new members Mando Lopez and Jose Medeles, the Breeders released the albums Title TK in 2002 and Mountain Battles in 2008. Meanwhile Macpherson was a member of Guided by Voices from 1998 to 2001, and participated in other projects with Guided By Voices' Robert Pollard until 2005. Farley was also a member of Guided by Voices from 1999 to 2004. In 2013, the Last Splash-era Breeders line-up of Kim and Kelley Deal, Macpherson, and Wiggs reunited to tour to celebrate the 20th anniversary of that album.

== Members ==
- Kim Deal – vocals, guitars
- Kelley Deal – guitars
- Luis Lerma – bass
- Nate Farley – guitars
- Jim Macpherson – drums

== Discography ==
=== Album ===
Title	Release date	Label
Pacer	1995	4AD/Elektra

=== Single ===
Year	Title	Album	Label
1995	"Tipp City"	Pacer	4AD/Elektra
