= Alert Today, Alive Tomorrow =

Studio album by the Muffs
- Released: June 15, 1999
- Genre: Punk rock, pop punk, garage rock
- Length: 34:17
- Label: Honest Don's
- Producer: Kim Shattuck, Steve Holroyd

The Muffs chronology
Happy Birthday to Me (1997)	Alert Today, Alive Tomorrow (1999)	Really Really Happy (2004)

Professional ratings
Review scores
Source	Rating
AllMusic	3/5 stars
Entertainment Weekly	A−

Alert Today, Alive Tomorrow is the fourth album by the punk rock band the Muffs. It was released in 1999 on Honest Don's Records.

== Production ==
The album was produced by Kim Shattuck and Steve Holroyd. Due to laryngitis, Shattuck recorded her vocals at night, alone in the studio.

== Critical reception ==
The Washington Post wrote that "several of the [tunes] are melancholy enough for Nashville, and even such up-tempo ones as 'I'm Not Around' have a newfound twang to them." PopMatters wrote that "singer/guitarist Kim Shattuck writes songs that would sound really cool if they were played by a bunch of teenagers in a garage somewhere, but it just don't cut the mustard for a band with members in the above-30 age range." The Los Angeles Times wrote: "Once easily pegged as that catchy-but-punky garage band with the screaming girl singer and the volatile stage personality, the Muffs may be replicating in slow motion the sudden burst of maturation that transformed their British Invasion heroes during the mid-1960s." Spin wrote that the band "make riffology new again, channeling original Blondie with starry eyes and a bad motorscooter."

== Track listing ==
All songs written by Kim Shattuck.

1. "I Wish That I Could Be You" – 1.46
2. "Silly People" – 3.43
3. "Another Ugly Face" – 2.25
4. "Prettier Than Me" – 3.06
5. "Clown" – 2.39
6. "Your Kiss" – 3.11
7. "Numb" – 2.21
8. "I'm Not Around" – 2.27
9. "Blow Your Mind" – 1.43
10. "Room with No View" – 2.43
11. "Dear Liar Love Me" – 2.50
12. "In" – 2.14
13. "Jack Champagne" – 3.09

== Personnel ==
- Kim Shattuck – Guitar, vocals
- Ronnie Barnett – Bass
- Roy McDonald – Drums
- Steve Holroyd – Producer
- Kim Shattuck – Producer
