= The Muffs =

American rock band

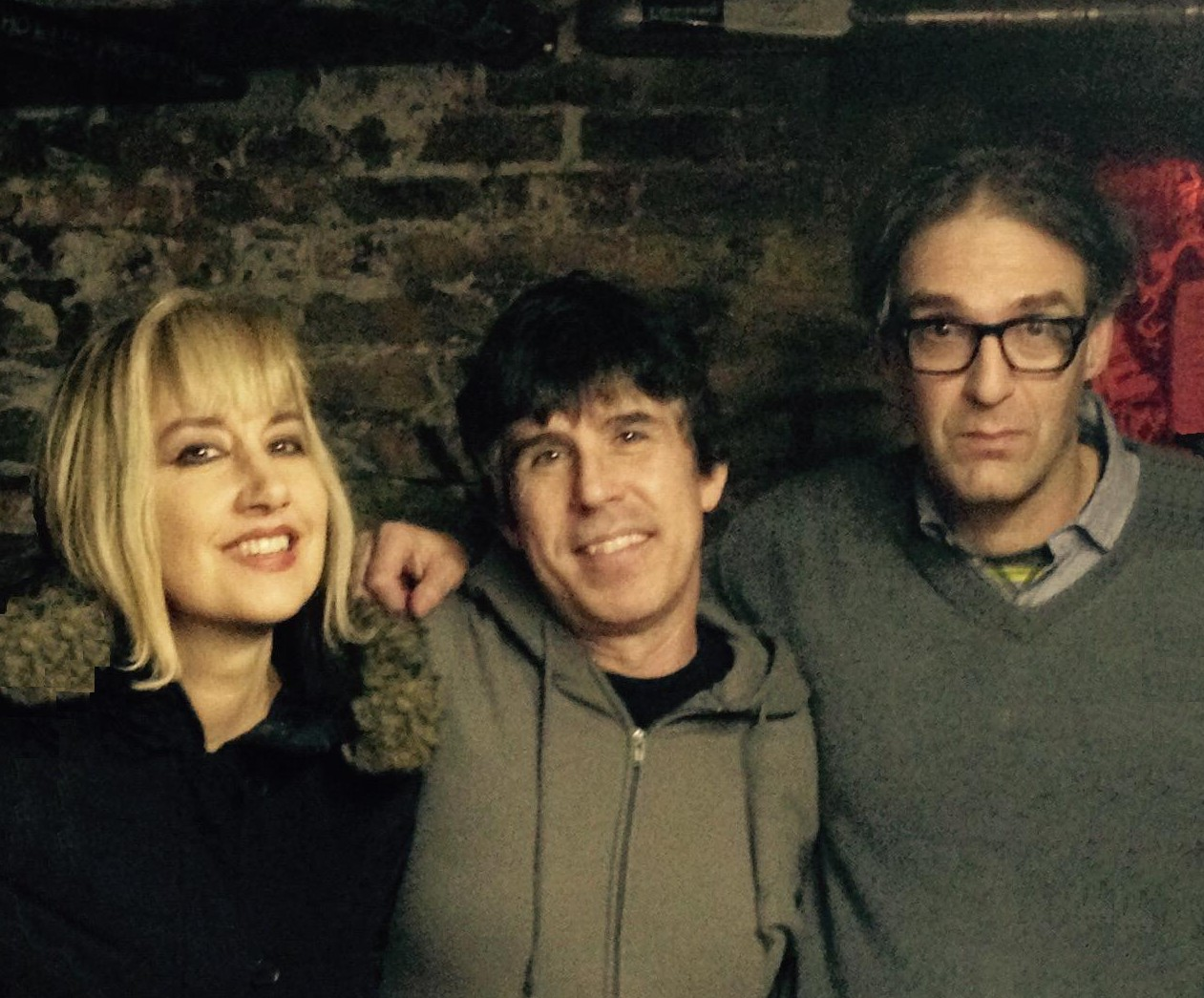
- The Muffs in 2014

Background information
- Origin: Los Angeles
- Genres: Pop-punk; power pop
- Years active: 1991–1999; 2002–2004; 2012–2019
- Labels: Warner Bros.; Sympathy for the Record Industry; Sub Pop; Reprise; Oglio; Five Foot Two; Honest Don's; Burger
- Spinoff of: The Pandoras
- Past members: Kim Shattuck; Criss Crass; Melanie Vammen; Jim Laspesa; Ronnie Barnett; Roy McDonald

The Muffs were an American pop-punk band based in Southern California, formed in 1991. Led by singer and guitarist Kim Shattuck, the band released four full-length studio albums in the 1990s, as well as numerous singles including "Lucky Guy" and "Sad Tomorrow", and a cover version of "Kids in America". After a long hiatus beginning in 1999, the band released a fifth album in 2004 but thereafter effectively disbanded. Almost a decade later, the three core members of the band reunited and started performing again. Their sixth album, Whoop Dee Doo, was released in 2014.

Kim Shattuck died on October 2, 2019, following a two-year battle with ALS. On that same day, the Muffs confirmed that they had disbanded. Shortly after, the Muffs released their seventh and final album No Holiday.

== History ==
=== Formation and early years: 1991–1996 ===
The band started as a collaboration between guitarists Kim Shattuck and Melanie Vammen, both former members of the 1980s all-female hard rock group, The Pandoras. The Muffs started performing and recording after the addition of bassist Ronnie Barnett and drummer Criss Crass.

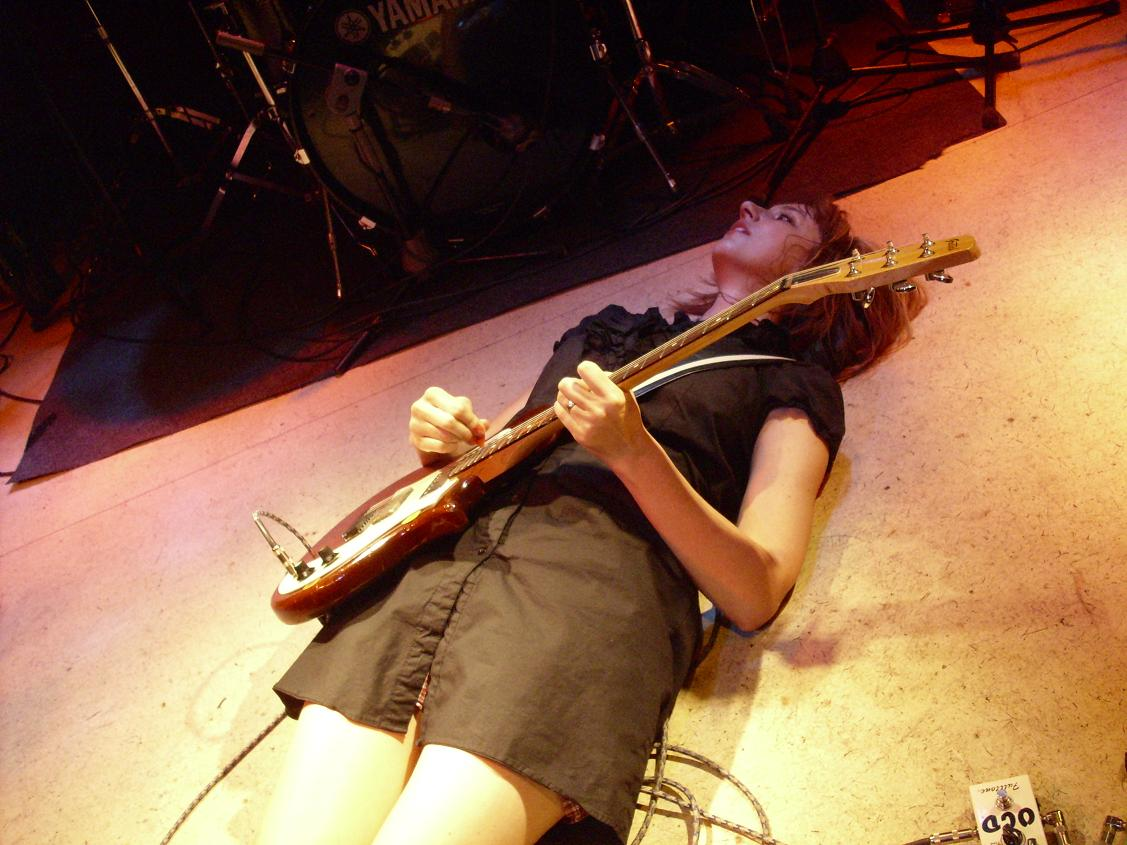
Kim Shattuck in Madrid, Spain, 2009

The Muffs released their initial 7-inch EPs and singles – "New Love" and "Guilty" (1991), and "I Need You" (1992) – on the West Coast independent labels Sub Pop and Sympathy for the Record Industry. Based on the public and critical response to these early releases, the band was signed to Warner Bros. Records. They established a reputation for "straightforward pop punk". In the words of musician and critic Scott Miller, the Muffs had "an uncommon flair for simple, catchy melodies" which, he noted approvingly, were always delivered in "Kim Shattuck's almost comically sneering adolescent rasp".

The band released their self-titled debut album in 1993. Crass left soon after its release, and drummer Jim Laspesa filled in during the subsequent tour, with Roy McDonald (formerly of Redd Kross) taking over the position permanently in 1994. By the time the tour was over, Vammen had decided to leave the group as well, eventually joining The Leaving Trains.

As a trio of Shattuck, Barnett, and McDonald, The Muffs recorded their second album, Blonder and Blonder. It was released on Warner's subsidiary Reprise Records in 1995. The album included the college radio hit single, "Sad Tomorrow".

=== Subsequent releases and hiatus: 1996–2005 ===
The Muffs contributed a cover of the 1981 Kim Wilde hit "Kids In America" to the soundtrack for the 1995 film Clueless. Their version of the song is also used in the music video game Rock Band 2, and was later reissued on The Muffs' 2000 compilation album, Hamburger.

The band made their third album, Happy Birthday to Me, in 1997, and it proved to be their final release through Warner Bros. Moving to independent label Honest Don's Records, they released Alert Today, Alive Tomorrow in 1999. This album includes "I Wish That I Could Be You", featured on the Buffy the Vampire Slayer episode "The Freshman". Also in 1999, the band contributed the song "Pimmel" to the compilation album Short Music for Short People on Fat Wreck Chords.

Towards the end of 1999, the group went on hiatus, and didn't create any new material for five years. Their fifth album, Really Really Happy, was released in 2004. It presents a distinct departure from the Muffs' signature style, with many of the songs sounding softer than previous work, "mellower" and "definitely happier".

=== Final years and death of Kim Shattuck: 2012–2019 ===
In 2012, the Muffs appeared at the "Girls Got Rhythm" fest in St. Paul, Minnesota, along with Ronnie Spector, The 5.6.7.8's, Nikki Corvette and L'Assassins. Shattuck credited former member Laspesa as being instrumental in bringing about the reunion of Barnett, McDonald, and herself.

The Muffs' first album in a decade, Whoop Dee Doo, was released by Burger Records in July 2014. Shattuck wrote all 12 songs, and handled production and engineering of almost the entire album.

As conveyed by its self-deprecating title, Whoop Dee Doo was a return to form for the Muffs. Its sound is "rough with punk edges", and it keeps a "heavy emphasis on humor and brevity". A positive review of the album on Pitchfork notes: "They haven't slowed down or softened their attack, or lost their way with tune-construction. Even Shattuck's voice remains barely touched by time... There is scarcely a more consistent band in all of American pop-punk".

Lead singer Kim Shattuck died on October 2, 2019, after a two-year battle with ALS. On October 18, 2019, The Muffs released their final album No Holiday, which comprises tracks spanning the beginnings of the band in 1991 to 2017.

== Musical style ==
The band's style of pop-punk is described as "slap-happy" by AllMusic. Their music is known for its abundance of hooks. Yardbarker stated that they "had more of an actual raw punk vibe but was lumped into the bubble-gum punk that rose to prominence in the middle-to-late end of the decade."

== Covers and tributes ==
Punk rock band The Queers covered the Muffs song "End It All" on their 2007 reissue of the album Don't Back Down. British indie band Silver Sun covered the Muffs song "I'm a Dick" on their Too Much, Too Little, Too Late EP. American punk rock band The Huntingtons covered the Muffs song "Big Mouth" on their Rock 'N' Roll Habits For The New Wave LP. "Big Mouth" was also covered by American punk rock bands Off with Their Heads (on the Art of the Underground Singles Series Volume 9) and The Linda Lindas (for the soundtrack of the film Moxie).

== Band members ==
=== Former line-up ===
- Kim Shattuck - lead vocals, lead guitar, occasional keyboards
- Melanie Vammen - rhythm guitar, backing vocals (1991-1994)
- Ronnie Barnett - bass guitar, occasional backing vocals
- Criss Crass - drums, backing vocals (1991-1994)
- Jim Laspesa - drums (1994)
- Roy McDonald - drums, backing vocals (1994-1999; 2002-2004; 2012-2019)

== Discography ==
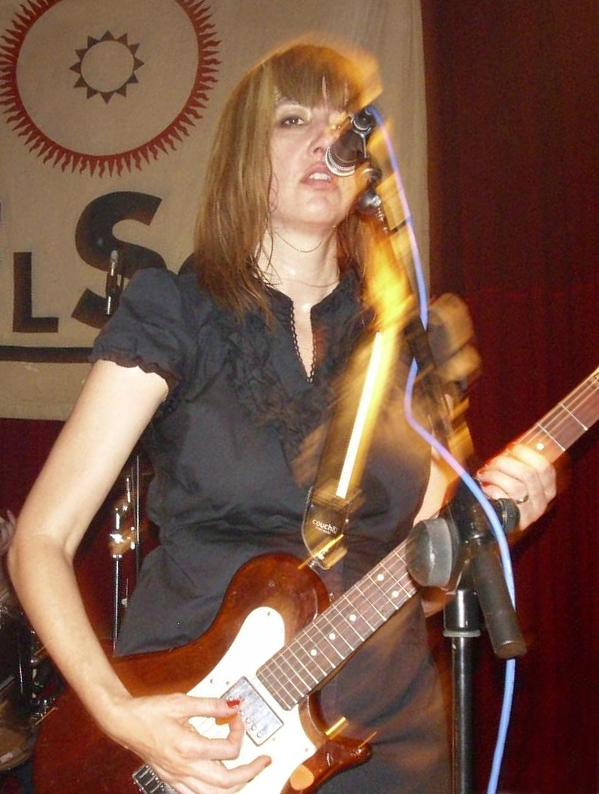
Kim Shattuck playing in Spain, 2009

=== Studio albums ===
- The Muffs (1993) (reissued with bonus tracks by Omnivore Recordings in 2015)
- Blonder and Blonder (1995)
- Happy Birthday to Me (1997)
- Alert Today, Alive Tomorrow (1999)
- Really Really Happy (2004)
- Whoop Dee Doo (2014)
- No Holiday (2019)

=== Compilation albums ===
- Hamburger (2000)
- Kaboodle (2011)

=== Live albums ===
- Live at Fort Apache (2026) (Recorded June 1, 1995)

=== Singles ===
- "New Love" (1991)
- "Guilty" (1991)
- "I Need You" (1992)
- "Big Mouth" (1993)
- "Lucky Guy" (1993)
- "Everywhere I Go" (1993)
- "Sad Tomorrow" (1995) (#29 Canadian RPM Alternative Singles)
- "I'm a Dick" (1996)
- "Outer Space" (1998)
- "Happening" (1999)
- "No Action" (2000)
- "Really Really Happy" (2004)
- "A Lovely Day Boo Hoo" (2019)
- "Changes" (2023)

=== Music videos ===
1993	Name
1993	"Lucky Guy"
1993	"New Love"
1995	"Sad Tomorrow"
1995	"Oh Nina"
2004	"Really Really Happy"
2004	"Don't Pick On Me"
2014	"Weird Boy Next Door"
2019	"No Holiday"
