= Kim Shattuck =

American singer, musician, and songwriter (1963–2019)

- Shattuck in 2014
- Born: Kimberly Dianne Shattuck; July 17, 1963; Long Beach, California, U.S.
- Died: October 2, 2019 (aged 56); Los Angeles, California, U.S.
- Resting place: Forest Lawn Memorial Park
- Occupations: Singer; musician; songwriter
- Years active: 1985–2019
- Musical career
- Genres: Alternative rock; punk rock; pop punk
- Instruments: Vocals; guitar; bass guitar
- Formerly of: The Pandoras; The Beards; The Muffs

Kimberly Dianne Shattuck (July 17, 1963 – October 2, 2019) was an American singer, musician, and songwriter. She was the lead vocalist, guitarist, and primary songwriter of the American punk rock band the Muffs, which formed in 1991. From 1985 to 1990, Shattuck was a member of the Pandoras. In 2001, she was a singer, guitarist and songwriter for the Beards, a side project composed of Shattuck, Lisa Marr, and Sherri Solinger. In 2013, she was the bass player for Pixies.

== Music career ==
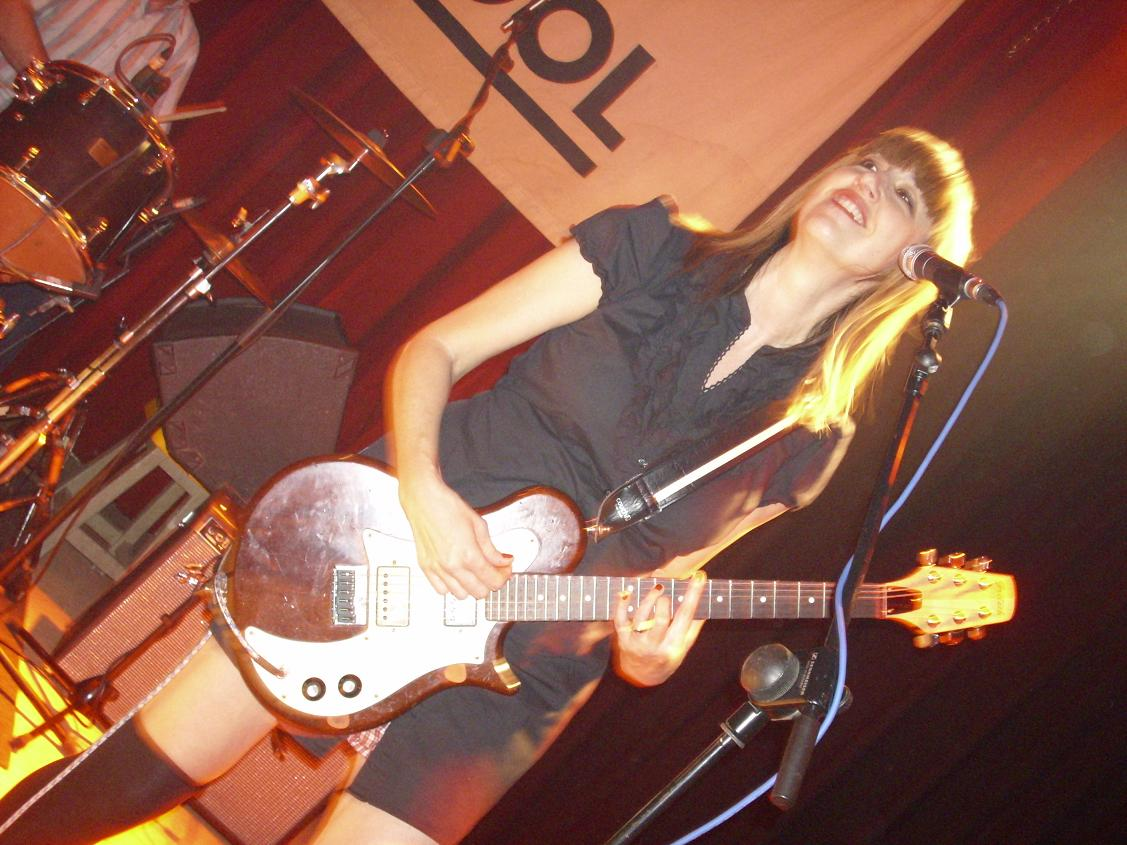
Shattuck performing in 2009

Shattuck played bass and sang backing vocals for the Pandoras from 1985 to 1990. In 1991, switching to guitar and assuming lead vocals, she formed the Muffs in Los Angeles with fellow Pandoras veteran Melanie Vammen. The band remained active over the following two decades, releasing seven albums between 1993 and 2019.

In addition to her work with the Pandoras and the Muffs, Shattuck was involved in numerous other musical projects. In the early 1990s she sang on several White Flag recordings and occasionally appeared with the band live. She sang on the NOFX song "Lori Meyers" on the album Punk in Drublic (1994), as well as on a Bowling for Soup song, "I'll Always Remember You (That Way)", which was included with the single "My Wena" (2009). She also collaborated with vocals for the Kepi Ghoulie song "This Friend of Mine" on the album American Gothic and the Dollyrots for their track "Some Girls" off the album A Little Messed Up. Shattuck is the namesake of Dr. Shattuck, a character on Mr. Show (HBO, 1995–1999).

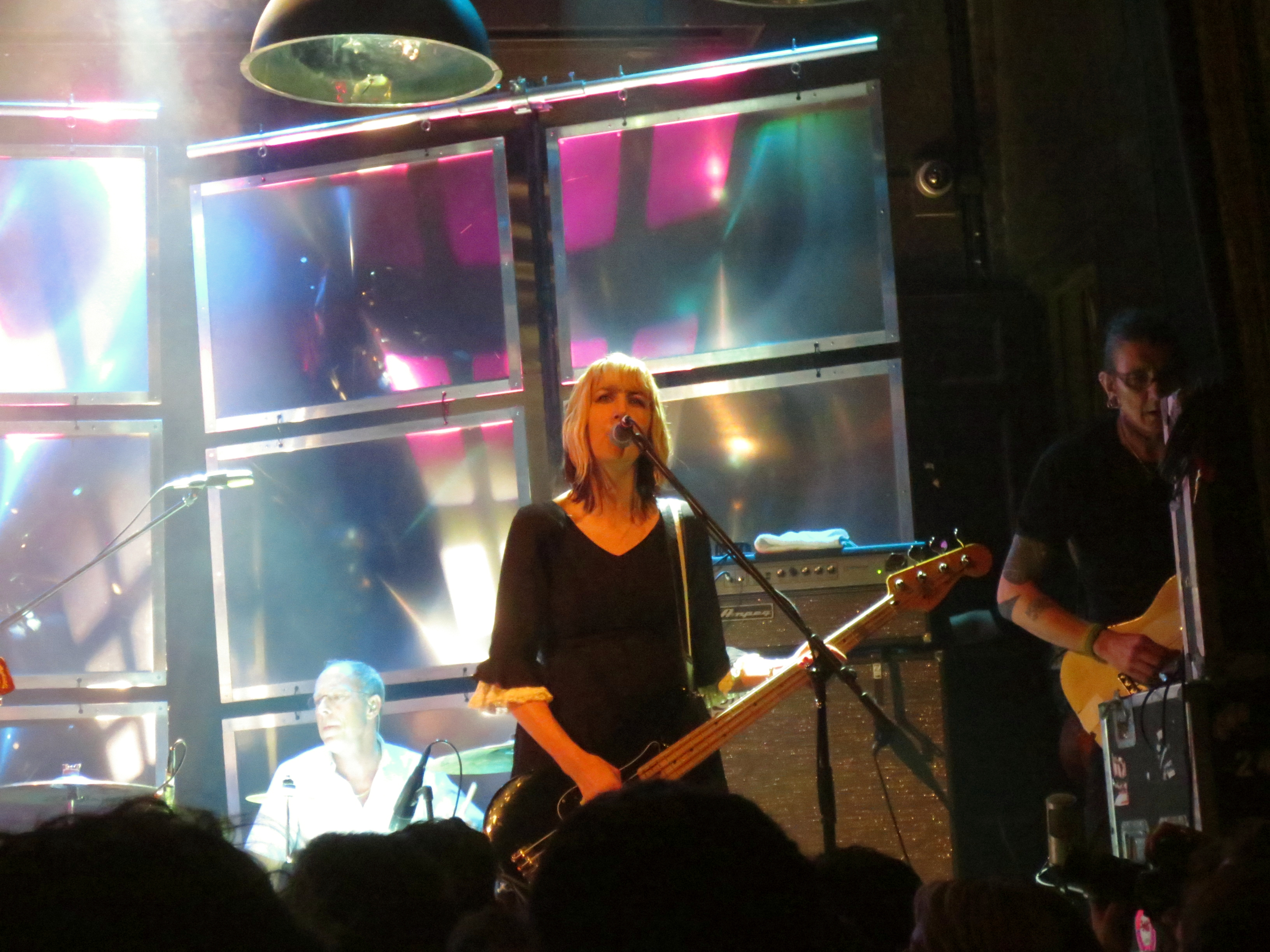
Shattuck with Pixies in 2013

Shattuck joined the Pixies for their fall 2013 European tour, following the departure of original member Kim Deal, but was fired at the end of the tour in late November 2013. Shortly before her death, she recorded a six-song EP with Vammen and Palmyra Delran as the Coolies, which included a special appearance by Stevie Van Zandt on theremin.

Shattuck participated in several studio and live reunions of the Pandoras from 2014 to 2018. Although she originally played bass and sang backing vocals in the Pandoras, she was the lead singer and guitarist for these reunions due to the death of original Pandoras lead singer and guitarist Paula Pierce in 1991.

== Personal life ==
Shattuck was born on July 17, 1963, in Long Beach, California, daughter of Kent and Betty (née Hess) Shattuck. She was raised in Orange County along with her brother, Kirk, and sister, Kristen. She began playing guitar while attending Orange Coast College, where she was studying photography.

Shattuck was married to Kevin Sutherland for 16 years, until her death. She died at her home in Los Angeles on October 2, 2019, from complications of amyotrophic lateral sclerosis, aged 56. She never publicly disclosed that she had the disease, but did state that it ran in her paternal family. Shortly before her death, the Muffs had recorded their seventh studio album, No Holiday, which was released on October 18, 2019.
