= Luscious Jackson discography =

- Studio albums: 5
- EPs: 1
- Singles: 11
- Compilation albums: 1

American alternative rock group Luscious Jackson has released four studio albums (including one children's album), one EP, eleven singles and one official compilation album.

== Albums ==
=== Studio albums ===
Title	Album details	Peak chart positions						Certifications
Title	Album details	US 200	US Heat.	AUS	AUT	NZ	UK	Certifications
Natural Ingredients	Released: August 23, 1994; Label: Grand Royal; Formats: LP, CD, cassette	114	2	—	—	—	—	
Fever In Fever Out	Released: October 29, 1996; Label: Grand Royal; Formats: LP, CD, cassette	72	—	62	—	39	55	RIAA: Gold
Electric Honey	Released: June 29, 1999; Label: Grand Royal; Formats: LP, CD, cassette	102	—	69	42	—	99	
Magic Hour	Released: November 5, 2013; Label: City Song; Formats: CD	—	—	—	—	—	—	
Baby DJ	Released: November 12, 2013; Label: City Song; Format: CD	—	—	—	—	—	—	

=== Compilation album ===
Title	Details
Greatest Hits	Released: February 20, 2007; Label: Capitol; Format: CD

== Extended play ==
Title	Details
In Search of Manny	Released: 1992; Label: Grand Royal; Formats: CD, cassette

== Singles ==
Year	Song	Peak chart positions						Album
Year	Song	US Hot 100	US Alt.	AUS	AUT	NZ	UK	Album
1993	"Daughters of the Kaos"	—	—	—	—	—	—	In Search of Manny
1994	"Let Yourself Get Down"	—	—	—	—	—	—	In Search of Manny
1994	"Citysong"	—	39	—	—	—	69	Natural Ingredients
1994	"Deep Shag"	—	39	—	—	—	69	Natural Ingredients
1995	"Here"	—	—	111	—	—	59	Natural Ingredients
1996	"Naked Eye"	36	18	64	42	—	25	Fever In Fever Out
1996	"Under Your Skin"	—	—	197	—	—	—	Fever In Fever Out
1996	"Why Do I Lie?"	—	—	—	—	—	—	Fever In Fever Out
1999	"Let It Snow"	—	—	—	—	—	—	Non-album single
1999	"Ladyfingers"	—	28	—	—	27	43	Electric Honey
1999	"Nervous Breakthrough"	—	—	—	—	—	—	Electric Honey

== Music videos ==
Year	Song	Director
1993	"Daughters of the Kaos"	Tamra Davis
1994	"Citysong"	Tamra Davis
1994	"Deep Shag"	Steven Hanft
1995	"Here"	Jake Scott
1997	"Naked Eye"	Marcus Raboy
1997	"Under Your Skin"	Chris Applebaum
1999	"Let It Snow"	Lance Bangs
1999	"Ladyfingers"	Tamra Davis

== Appearances ==
- "Love Is Here" was released on the A Life Less Ordinary Soundtrack (1997)
- A Squirmel remix of "Here" appeared on the soundtrack to Clueless.
- "Down to Earth" for Titan A.E. (2000)
