= Greatest Hits (Luscious Jackson album) =

Greatest hits album by Luscious Jackson
- Released: February 20, 2007
- Genres: Alternative rock; alternative hip hop; pop rock
- Label: Capitol

Luscious Jackson chronology
Electric Honey (1999)	Greatest Hits (2007)	Magic Hour (2013)

Professional ratings
Review scores
Source	Rating
AllMusic	4.5/5 stars

Greatest Hits is a compilation album from New York City alternative rock group Luscious Jackson, released on the Capitol label on Feb 20, 2007 (see 2007 in music). Released by Capitol, only one of the tracks from their Grand Royal debut EP, In Search of Manny, made the cut.

The album was released seven years after the breakup of the band and on the same day as Jill Cunniff's solo debut, City Beach.

== Track listing ==
Greatest Hits track listing
No.	Title	Writer(s)	Producer(s)	Length
1.	"Intro" (from Natural Ingredients, 1994)			0:04
2.	"Naked Eye" (Radio Version, from Fever In Fever Out, 1996)	Jill Cunniff	Daniel Lanois, Tony Mangurian, Jill Cunniff	4:10
3.	"Strongman" (from Natural Ingredients, 1994)	Jill Cunniff, Gabby Glaser	Cunniff, Gabby Glaser, Mangurian, Kate Schellenbach	4:21
4.	"Under Your Skin" (from Fever In Fever Out, 1996)	Jill Cunniff	Daniel Lanois, Tony Mangurian, Jill Cunniff	3:58
5.	"Ladyfingers" (from Electric Honey, 1999)	Jill Cunniff	Tony Mangurian, Jill Cunniff	3:28
6.	"Here" (from Natural Ingredients, 1994)	Jill Cunniff, Gabby Glaser	Jill Cunniff, Gabby Glaser, Tony Mangurian	3:28
7.	"Christine" (from Electric Honey, 1999)	Jill Cunniff	Tony Mangurian, Jill Cunniff	3:30
8.	"Let Yourself Get Down" (from In Search of Manny, 1992)	Jill Cunniff, Gabby Glaser	Jill Cunniff, Gabby Glaser, Tony Mangurian	3:37
9.	"Why Do I Lie?" (from Fever In Fever Out, 1996)	Jill Cunniff	Daniel Lanois, Tony Mangurian, Jill Cunniff	3:20
10.	"Citysong" (from Natural Ingredients, 1994)	Jill Cunniff, Gabby Glaser	Jill Cunniff, Gabby Glaser, Tony Mangurian	4:21
11.	"Nervous Breakthrough" (from Electric Honey, 1999)	Jill Cunniff	Tony Mangurian, Jill Cunniff	3:48
12.	"Love Is Here" (from A Life Less Ordinary, 1997)	Jill Cunniff	Tony Mangurian, Jill Cunniff	3:01
13.	"69 Année Érotique" (from Ain't Nuthin' But a She Thing, 1995)	Serge Gainsbourg	The Butcher Brothers, Luscious Jackson	2:58
14.	"Friends" (from Electric Honey, 1999)	Gabby Glaser	Gabby Glaser, Tony Mangurian	3:31
15.	"Deep Shag" (from Natural Ingredients, 1994)	Jill Cunniff, Gabby Glaser	Jill Cunniff, Gabby Glaser, Tony Mangurian	3:32
16.	"Beloved" (from Electric Honey, 1999)	Jill Cunniff	Tony Mangurian, Jill Cunniff	2:59
17.	"Ladyfingers (Kurt's Guaranteed Every Time Mix)" (1999)	Jill Cunniff	KutMasta Kurt	3:58
18.	"Naked Eye (Tony's Magic Mix)" (1996)	Jill Cunniff	Tony Mangurian, Jamie Candiloro	5:11
19.	"Why Do I Lie? (Pants on Fire Remix)" (2007)	Jill Cunniff	Mike D, Jamey Staub	3:23
20.	"Nervous Breakthrough (Thievery Corporation Remix)" (2000)	Jill Cunniff	Rob Garza, Eric Hilton	5:03
