= Fellaheen Records =

Australian record label (defunct)

- Founded: 1993
- Founder: Steven Stavrakis and Stephen Pavlovic
- Defunct: c1998
- Status: Defunct
- Distributor: Shock Records
- Genre: indie
- Country of origin: Australia
- Location: Sydney

Fellaheen Records was an Australian record label run by Steven Stavrakis and Stephen Pavlovic.

The label was founded in 1993 after Stavrakis' closed his previous label Waterfront Records. The new label released music from local and international acts, including Australians Fur, Budd, Sourpuss, Ben Lee, Magic Dirt, and was considered more "indie" than Waterfront.

In 1995 they released the Beastie Boys' Aglio E Olio EP as a lathe cut clear vinyl record, with some being shared with the Beastie Boys' label Grand Royal. Three other lathe records were released for bands Gerling, Pavement, and Sourpuss. The label also released other Grand Royal albums by DJ Hurricane and Luscious Jackson, often with exclusives tracks. Grand Royal in turn released Ben Lee's debut album in America, and Fellaheen is credited with starting Ben Lee's career.

Adam Yee was Assistant Managing Director/ A & R at Fellaheen Records for three and a half years, but left in August 1997. Later that month, Fellaheen Records' operations were taken over by Shock Records, where they were looked after by Tom Larnach-Jones. Shock later owned the label outright. Following this, Pavlovic started another label Modular Recordings in 1998. Stavrakis worked at Modular briefly before starting In-Fidelity Recordings with Bruce Milne in 2002.

== Discography ==
Catalogue	Artist	Title
JacK 001-2	The Fluid	Spot The Loon
JacK 001-7	Budd	Helpmeswell
JacK 002-7	Magic Dirt	Supertear/Sea
JacK 003-7	Midget	Juice/Flicker
JacK 004-2	The Fluid	Spot The Loon
JacK 005-2	Budd	Yakfat
JacK 006-7	Noise Addict	I Wish I Was Him
JacK 007.5-2	Noise Addict	Vs. Silverchair
JacK 008-7	Fur	Fix It/ Chocolate Sea
JacK 009-2	Pavement	Crooked Rain, Crooked Rain
JacK 010-2	Superchunk	Foolish
JacK 010.5-2	Superchunk	Foolish Tour Edition
JacK 011-2	Huggy Bear	...Presents Main Squeeze
JacK 012-2	Hateman	Triple Forte
JacK 014-2	Fur	Find What You Like & Let It Kill You
JacK 015-2	Pavement	Gold Soundz
JacK 016-2	Budd	Naf
JacK 017-2	Luscious Jackson	Natural Ingredients
JacK 018-2	Hurricane	The Hurra
JacK 019-2	Superchunk	The On Paper It Made Perfect Sense EP
JacK 020-2	Pavement	Rattle By The Rush
JacK 021-2	Pavement	Wowee Zowee
JacK 022-2	Guided By Voices	Alien Lanes
JacK 023-2	Ben Lee	Grandpaw Would
JacK 024-2	Superchunk	Incidental Music 1991-95
JacK 025-2	Diolene	Dee-O-Leen
JacK 026-2	Pavement	Father To A Sister Of Thought
JacK 027-2	Fur	Losin' Your Marbles
JacK 028-2	Superchunk	Hyper Enough
JacK 029-2	Superchunk	Here's Where The Strings Come In
JacK 030-2	Ben Lee	Away With The Pixies
JacK 031-2	Noise Addict	Meet The Real You
JacK 032-2	Pavement	Pacific Trim
JacK 032-7	Pavement	Pacific Trim
JacK 033-2	Beastie Boys	Aglio E Olio
JacK 033-7	Beastie Boys	Aglio E Olio
JacK 034-7	Gerling	Sedatives For Dead Radars
JacK 035-7	Sourpuss	Solvent
JacK 036-2	Budd	Ovit
JacK 037-2	Sourpuss	Tabouli
JacK 038-2	Diolene	Cazzo, Cucucelle e Ove
JacK 039-2	Guided By Voices	Under The Bushes Under The Stars
JacK 040-2	Fur	Neon Pressure
JacK 041-2	Kostars	Klassics With a K
JacK 042-2	Gerling	A Day of Research
JacK 043-2	Sandpit	Lessons In Posture
JacK 045-1	Fur & Diolene	Split
JacK 046-2	Superchuck & Guided By Voices	Split
Jack 047-2	Various	Fellaheen Compilation
JacK 048-1	Sebadoh	Bakesale
JacK 049-2	Sandpit	The Tyranny Of Creeps
JacK 050-2	Pavement	Brighten The Corners
Jack 051-2	Fur	The Betty Shakes
JacK 052-2	Ben Lee	Something To Remember Me By
JacK 053-2	Fur	Blondi
JacK054-7	Pavement	Shady Lane
JacK 056	Fur	High Side
JacK057-2	Superchunk	Indoor Living
JacK 059-2	Sandpit	Along The Moors
JacK 061-2	Sandpit	Greater Expectations
JacK 062-2	Fur	Jimmy Rogers
JacK 063-2	Sandpit	On Second Thought
JacK 065-2	Sandpit	The Hunting Picture
JacK 066-2	Budd	Naf/Ovit
JacK 067-2	Budd	Prana
