= Electric Honey (album) =

Studio album by Luscious Jackson
- Released: June 29, 1999
- Recorded: 1998–1999
- Studios: Space Lounge; Greene Street (New York City); Secret (NYC); Soho Music (NYC); Magic Shop (NYC)
- Genre: Alternative rock
- Length: 50:01
- Labels: Grand Royal, Capitol Records
- Producers: Jill Cunniff, Gabrielle Glaser, Tony Mangurian, Mickey Petralia, 25 Ton, Tony Visconti, Alex Young

Luscious Jackson chronology
Fever In Fever Out (1996)	Electric Honey (1999)	Greatest Hits (2007)

Singles from Electric Honey
- 1. "Ladyfingers" Released: June 14, 1999; 2. "Nervous Breakthrough" Released: June 17, 1999

Electric Honey is the third studio album by Luscious Jackson, released on June 29, 1999, by Grand Royal. It peaked at number 102 on the Billboard 200 chart, as well as number 99 on the UK Albums Chart.

== Reception ==
Professional ratings
Review scores
Source	Rating
AllMusic	3/5 stars
Chicago Sun-Times	3.5/4 stars
Entertainment Weekly	A−
The Guardian	4/5 stars
Los Angeles Times	3/4 stars
NME	5/10
Pitchfork	5.4/10
Q	3/5 stars
Rolling Stone	3/5 stars
Select	3/5

AllMusic critic Stephen Thomas Erlewine opined that Electric Honey "finds Luscious Jackson narrowing their focus, concentrating more on groove and texture than full-fledged songs", resulting in an album that is "breezy and enjoyable, to be sure, but nevertheless a little too lightweight to really take hold."

== Track listing ==
All songs written by Jill Cunniff, except tracks 5, 7, 10, 12 and 14, by Gabrielle Glaser.

1. "Nervous Breakthrough" – 3:47
2. "Ladyfingers" – 3:27
3. "Christine" – 3:30
4. "Alien Lover" – 3:50
5. "Summer Daze" – 3:31
6. "Sexy Hypnotist" – 3:14
7. "Friends" – 3:30
8. "Devotion" – 3:14
9. "Fantastic Fabulous" (featuring Deborah Harry) – 3:14
10. "Gypsy" – 3:01
11. "Beloved" – 2:58
12. "Country's a Callin'" – 3:10
13. "Space Diva" – 3:25
14. "Fly" – 4:17
15. "Lover's Moon" – 1:53

== Personnel ==
Luscious Jackson

- Jill Cunniff – vocals (tracks 1–4, 6, 8, 9, 11, 13, 15), guitar (1–3, 6, 8, 9, 11, 13, 15), bass guitar (1–9, 11, 13), keyboards (4, 6), backing vocals (10, 12), space opera (13)
- Gabrielle Glaser – rap vocals (1, 4), keyboards (1, 7, 10), guitar (4, 5, 7, 10, 12–14), vocals (5, 7, 10, 12, 14), keyboard strings (5), piano (7, 10), lead guitar (9), backing vocals (9, 13), bass guitar (10, 12), drum programming (12), mellotron (14)
- Kate Schellenbach – percussion (1), drums (3, 4, 6–14)

Additional musicians

- Tia Sprocket – percussion (1), backing vocals (5, 7, 14), finger snaps (14)
- Robert Aaron – horns (1, 6), flute (5, 6)
- Tony Mangurian – programming (1–3, 6, 11), vocals (2), backing vocals (5, 7), drum programming (5), additional drums (7), guitar (11), piano (11), keyboards (2), "Jalfrazi guy" (10)
- Emmylou Harris – backing vocals (2, 12)
- G. Wise – talkbox (2)
- N'Dea Davenport – ghost vocals (3)
- Daniel Lanois – slide guitar (3)
- Alex Young – DJ (3, 9)
- Mickey Petralia – programming (4, 8)
- Roger Manning – additional keyboards (4, 8)
- Danny Frankel – percussion (4, 8)
- Kym Hampton – backing vocals (7)
- Diane Friedewald – backing vocals (7)
- Irene Bremis – backing vocals (7)
- Sean Raynor – backing vocals (7)
- Deborah Harry – guest vocals (9)
- Lisa Haney – strings (9)
- 25 Ton – programming (13)
- Petra Haden – violin (13, 15)
- Josephine Wiggs – cello (13), upright bass (14)
- Vincent Louis – percussion (14)

Technical

- Andy Wallace – mixing
- Jamey Staub – mixing (4, 8, 13–15)
- Steve Sisco – assistant engineer
- Tony Mangurian – co-producer (1, 2, 5–7, 10–12), engineer (2)
- Jill Cunniff – co-producer (1, 2, 4, 6, 8, 9, 11, 13, 15)
- Serge Tsai – engineer (1, 3, 5–7, 10–12)
- Mickey Petralia – co-producer (4, 8)
- Phil Painson – assistant engineer (4, 8, 13)
- Danny Madorsky – assistant engineer (4, 8, 13)
- Robert Carranza – additional engineering (4)
- Gabrielle Glaser – co-producer (5, 7, 10, 12, 14)
- Jaime Candiloro – additional engineering (7)
- Tony Visconti – co-producer (9), engineer (9)
- Juan Garcia – additional engineering (9), assistant engineer (14)
- 25 Ton – co-producer (13, 14)
- Prince Strickland III – assistant engineer (13, 15)
- Alex Kyriazsis – additional engineering (13)
- Howie Weinberg – mastering
- Danny Clinch – cover, back cover and equipment photography
- Susan Alzner – Kate drum photo
- Jeremy Creamer – Jill bass photo
- Tommy Grimm – Gabby live guitar photo
- Parents – kid photos
- Orb Acton – country photo
- Gabriel Trujillo – hair, make-up
- Jeffrey Fernandez – styling
- Bill McMullen – art direction, design

== Charts ==
Chart (1999)	Peak position
Australian Albums (ARIA)	69
Austrian Albums (Ö3 Austria)	42
UK Albums (OCC)	99
US Billboard 200	102
