= Dusty Trails (album) =

- (album photo: Sara Press)

Studio album by Dusty Trails
- Released: May 9, 2000
- Studios: Boutique (NYC); Meat and Potatoes (NYC); Fairfield House (UK)
- Genres: Indie rock; indie pop; ambient pop; downtempo; lounge; bossa nova
- Length: 43:31
- Label: Atlantic
- Producer: Dusty Trails

Professional ratings
Review scores
Source	Rating
AllMusic	4/5 stars

Dusty Trails is the self-titled debut album by the American music duo Dusty Trails. It was released on May 9, 2000, by Atlantic Records.

== Track listing ==
All music by Dusty Trails, lyrics by Vivian Trimble, except where otherwise indicated.

1. "Pearls on a String" – 2:52
2. "You Freed Yourself" (Lyrics: Laura Graham) – 3:10
3. "Spy in the Lounge" (Music: Dusty Trails, Dave Grusin, Stephen Stills) – 3:39
4. "Est-Ce Que Tu" – 3:59
5. "Roll the Dice" (Lyrics: Jill Cunniff, Trimble) – 3:10
6. "St-Tropez" – 4:14
7. "Unhand Me You Wretch" – 0:47
8. "They May Call Me a Dreamer" – 2:58
9. "Fool for a Country Tune" – 3:13
10. "Regrets in Bordertown" – 3:55
11. "Order Coffee" – 3:35
12. "Conga Style" (Music: Dusty Trails, Willie Cooper, Quincy Jones, Ernie Shelby) – 1:58
13. "Caught in a Dream" – 2:42
14. "Dusty Trails Theme" (Music: Dusty Trails, Cooper, Jones, Shelby) – 3:19

== Personnel ==
Dusty Trails

- Vivian Trimble – keyboards, keyboard strings, lead and backing vocals, accordion, acoustic guitar
- Josephine Wiggs – electric and upright bass, guitars, drums, bongos, percussion, backing vocals, vibe keyboards ("Est-Ce Que Tu")

Additional musicians

- Jon Mattock – conga, percussion ("You Freed Yourself")
- Audu Obaje – Elgam organ ("You Freed Yourself")
- Josh Roseman – trombone ("Spy in the Lounge")
- Jill Cunniff – vocals, acoustic guitar ("Roll the Dice")
- Sarah Cox – bass guitar ("Roll the Dice")
- Kate Schellenbach – drums ("St-Tropez", "They May Call Me a Dreamer")
- Emmylou Harris – lead vocals ("Order Coffee")

Technical

- Dusty Trails – producer
- Josephine Wiggs – engineer, mixing
- Leon Zervos – mastering
- Martin Ogolter – art direction, design
- Sarah Press – photography
- Basia Zomorska – stylist
- Gabriel Trujillo – hair, make-up
