= Fever In Fever Out =

Studio album by Luscious Jackson
- Released: October 29, 1996
- Studio: Kingsway (New Orleans)
- Genre: Alternative rock
- Length: 47:18
- Label: Grand Royal; Capitol
- Producer: Daniel Lanois; Tony Mangurian; Luscious Jackson

Luscious Jackson chronology
Natural Ingredients (1994)	Fever In Fever Out (1996)	Electric Honey (1999)

Singles from Fever In Fever Out
- 1. "Naked Eye" Released: March 23, 1997; 2. "Under Your Skin" Released: 1997

Fever In Fever Out is the second studio album by American alternative rock band Luscious Jackson. It was released on October 29, 1996, on Grand Royal and Capitol Records.

The album peaked at number 72 on the Billboard 200 chart, as well as number 55 on the UK Albums Chart. As of 2000, it had sold more than 500,000 copies.

== Critical reception ==
Professional ratings
Review scores
Source	Rating
AllMusic	4/5 stars
Alternative Press	3/5
Chicago Tribune	3.5/4 stars
Entertainment Weekly	B
The Guardian	4/5 stars
Los Angeles Times	2.5/4 stars
NME	5/10
Pitchfork	6.3/10
Q	4/5 stars
Rolling Stone Australia	3.5/5 stars

Stephen Thomas Erlewine of AllMusic said that while Luscious Jackson's previous album Natural Ingredients "lacked the darkly funky urban soundscapes" of the band's 1992 debut EP In Search of Manny, "Fever In Fever Out brings that dark funkiness while keeping the pop hooks that made Natural Ingredients a step forward." He concluded that "what really impresses is the sense of forward motion Luscious Jackson displays on Fever In Fever Out, how their eclecticism is becoming more seamless as their songs grow stronger."

== Track listing ==
No.	Title	Writer(s)	Length
1.	"Naked Eye"	Jill Cunniff	4:40
2.	"Don't Look Back"	Gabrielle Glaser	3:11
3.	"Door"		0:06
4.	"Mood Swing"	Cunniff, Vivian Trimble	3:21
5.	"Under Your Skin"	Cunniff	3:58
6.	"Electric"	Glaser	3:10
7.	"Take a Ride"	Luscious Jackson	6:47
8.	"Water Your Garden"	Cunniff	4:23
9.	"Soothe Yourself"	Cunniff, Trimble	4:14
10.	"Why Do I Lie?"	Cunniff	3:19
11.	"One Thing"	Luscious Jackson	3:04
12.	"Parade"		0:11
13.	"Faith"	Cunniff	3:05
14.	"Stardust"	Cunniff	3:49

== Personnel ==
Luscious Jackson

- Jill Cunniff – vocals (1, 4–5, 7–10, 13–14), guitar (1, 5, 8, 10, 13–14), bass guitar (1, 4–11, 13–14)
- Gabrielle Glaser – vocals (2, 6, 11), guitar (2, 4, 6–7, 9, 11), drum programming (2), lead guitar (8)
- Vivian Trimble – keyboards (1, 4–7, 9–11), keyboard strings (2), mellotron (8–9), piano (8, 14), backing vocals (9–10), outro vocals (9), Hammond organ (13)
- Kate Schellenbach – drums (1, 4–11, 13–14)

Additional musicians

- Daniel Lanois – slide guitar (8, 10), mando-guitar (10), bass guitar (11)
- Tony Mangurian – mellotron (1), acoustic guitar (1), drum fills (1), drum programming (1, 5, 14), timpanies (2), programming (8), bongos (9), bass pedals (14)
- Alex Young – additional drum looping (1, 5), DJ whales/wails (7, 9), artistic record scratches (13)
- Daryl Johnson – backing vocals (6), hand drum (6)
- The Guiro Brothers – percussion (6–7, 11)
- Emmylou Harris – backing vocals (9–11)
- N'Dea Davenport – backing vocals (11)

Technical

- Daniel Lanois – co-producer (1–14), co-mixing (2–14), inside sleeve photography
- Tony Mangurian – co-producer (1–14), co-mixing (1–14)
- Luscious Jackson – co-producers (4, 7, 9), co-mixing (2–5, 7–12, 14)
- Jamie Candiloro – co-mixing (1–5, 7–12, 14)
- Jill Cunniff – co-producer (1, 5, 8, 10, 13–14), co-mixing (1)
- Gabrielle Glaser – co-producer (2, 6, 11)
- Mark Howard – co-mixing (6, 13)
- Greg Calbi – mastering
- Kathy Guild – art direction
- Kim Biggs – art direction, inside sleeve and back cover design
- Rob Schroeder – design
- Bob Lanois – inside sleeve photography
- Matthew Horovitz – CD photograph

== Charts ==
=== Weekly charts ===
Chart (1996–1997)	Peak position
Australian Albums (ARIA)	62
New Zealand Albums (RMNZ)	39
UK Albums (OCC)	55
US Billboard 200	72

=== Year-end charts ===
Chart (1997)	Position
US Billboard 200	200
