= Robert Aaron =

Canadian jazz musician (born 1955)

- Also known as: Robert Arron (prior to October 1993)
- Born: Robert Arron Vineberg; November 13, 1955 (age 70); Montreal
- Genres: jazz
- Occupation: musician
- Instruments: flute, saxophone, clarinet, piano, guitar, trumpet, bassoon, french horn
- Labels: Heavenly Sweetness

Robert Aaron (born Robert Arron Vineberg; November 13, 1955) is a Canadian jazz musician. According to John Leland of the New York Times "Mr. Aaron played flute, saxophone, clarinet and piano, then taught himself guitar, trumpet, bassoon, French horn and other instruments." He performed for rapper Wyclef Jean's band from 1998 to 2008. Robin Caulden of Press-Republican said "He's played with everybody — Afrika Bambataa, B52s, Blondie, Chic, David Bowie, Heavy D, James Chance and The Contortions, RZA, Stetsasonic, William Vivanco and Wu-Tang Clan."

In 1981, he first started work with James Chance for the group James White and the Blacks; and has toured with him since in Europe and Japan. He played sax on David Bowie's 1983 hit "Let's Dance". In 2010, Aaron released his album Trouble Man, which Michael Daly of the Daily Beast called "artistically adventurous but commercially unsuccessful". Folk singer Eric Andersen, who used Aaron on several albums as a producer and performer, described him as "Absolutely dedicated. He lived for his art."

== Early life ==
Aaron was born in Montreal in 1955. He was discouraged from pursuing music as a career by his father, who taught piano. However, as a teenager in the 1970s, he decided to move to New York to perform and record with his band.

== Death of Philip Seymour Hoffman ==
Aaron was arrested in February 2014 for suspicion of selling the heroin that caused the overdose death of Philip Seymour Hoffman. Ultimately, prosecutors dropped the most serious charge, which was intent to sell heroin. He pleaded guilty to a lesser charge of felony drug possession, and was sentenced to five years’ probation.

== Notable credits ==
Credits according to AllMusic:

Year	Album	Artist	Credit
1982	The Hunter	Blondie	Horn Arrangements, Saxophone
1982	Sax Maniac	James White and The Blacks	Drums, Percussion, Piano, Sax (Tenor), Saxophone
1983	Let's Dance	David Bowie	Flute, Tenor (Vocal)
1983	James White's Flaming Demonics	James Chance	Member of Attributed Artist, Sax (Tenor)
1986	L Is for Lover	Al Jarreau	Musician, Reeds
1988	In Full Gear	Stetsasonic	Saxophone
1992	Nubian M.O.B.	Nubian M.O.B.	Bass, Flute, Guitar, Organ (Hammond), Piano, Programming, Saxophone
1993	The Album	Masters at Work	Keyboards, Saxophone
1995	Run Away	Robert Aaron	Primary Artist
1996	Sax in the Ozone	Robert Aaron	Primary Artist
1997	Nightbird Inventions	Dominic Duval	Tray Card
1998	Memory of the Future	Eric Andersen	Composer, Flute, Keyboard Bass, Keyboards, Organ (Hammond), producer, Sax (Baritone), Sax (Soprano), Sax (Tenor), Trumpet
1999	No Exit	Blondie	Additional Personnel, Flute, Sax (Baritone), Sax (Tenor)
1999	Electric Honey	Luscious Jackson	Flute, Horn
2000	You Can't Relive the Past	Eric Andersen	Clarinet, Flute, Piano
2000	Fear of Flying	Mýa	Horn
2000	It Doesn't Matter	Wyclef Jean	Horn
2000	The Ecleftic: 2 Sides II a Book	Wyclef Jean	Horn
2001	Goddess in the Doorway	Mick Jagger	Flute, Horn, Keyboards
2002	Mr. Jones	Tom Jones	Horn Arrangements, Sax (Baritone), Sax (Tenor), Saxophone
2002	Masquerade	Wyclef Jean	Keyboards, Saxophone
2003	Frank	Amy Winehouse	Flute, Saxophone
2003	Beat Avenue	Eric Andersen	Bass, Bass (Electric), composer, Flute, Guitar, Keyboards, Melodica, Mixing, Organ, Piano, producer, Sax (Baritone), Sax (Tenor), Trumpet
2003	Live and Kickin'	Willie Nelson	Keyboards
2003	Greatest Hits	Wyclef Jean	Horn
2003	The Preacher's Son	Wyclef Jean	Flute, Guitar, Melodica, Piano, Saxophone
2004	The Street Was Always There	Eric Andersen	Arranger, Audio Production, Bass, Clarinet, composer, Cuatro, Editing, Flute, Guitar (Bass), Guitar (Electric), Keyboards, Liner Notes, Main Personnel, Melodica, Organ, Piano, producer, Saxophone, Synthesizer
2004	Self Explanatory	I-20	Keyboards
2004	Same Girl	Trina Broussard	Flute, Keyboards, Saxophone
2004	Welcome to Haiti: Creole 101	Wyclef Jean	Keyboards, Saxophone
2005	Waves	Eric Andersen	Arranger, Bass, Congas, Fender Rhodes, Flute, Guitar (Acoustic), Melodica, Oboe, Organ, Organ (Hammond), Piano, Piccolo, producer, Quatro, Sax (Alto), Sax (Tenor)
2005	Odyssey	Fischerspooner	Flute
2006	Bole2Harlem, Vol. 1	Bole2Harlem	Horn
2007	City Beach	Jill Cunniff	Saxophone, Wurlitzer
2009	Entertainment	Fischerspooner	Flute, Sax (Alto), Sax (Baritone), Sax (Tenor), Trumpet (Pocket)
2010	Stolen Car	Certain General	Saxophone
2010	The Saddest Kiss	Robert Aaron	Primary Artist
2010	Trouble Man	Robert Aaron	Primary Artist
2010	Zaz	Zaz	Cuivres
2010	Like a Radio	Charles Schillings	Additional Production, Keyboards, Saxophone
2010	Twist Your Soul: The Definitive Collection	James Chance	Organ, Sax (Baritone), Sax (Tenor)
