= Magic Hour (Luscious Jackson album) =

Studio album by Luscious Jackson
- Released: November 5, 2013
- Studio: Streetwise Lullabies, New York City, New York, US; Pushbuttons! Studios, Los Angeles, California, US (drums)
- Genre: Alternative rock
- Length: 31:22
- Language: English
- Label: City Song
- Producer: Jill Cunniff; Gabrielle Glaser; ADW Young ("Aaw Turn It Up!"); Adam Horovitz ("So Rock On"); Jamie Staub (additional production)

Luscious Jackson chronology
Greatest Hits (2007)	Magic Hour (2013)	Baby DJ (2018)

“A friend working at PledgeMusic presented it to me and we were like, ‘Wow, this is a whole new world, So we decided to regroup the band and make new music.”

—Luscious Jackson guitarist and vocalist Jill Cunniff on the decision to reform and use crowdfunding for this album

Magic Hour is a 2013 studio album by American alternative rock band Luscious Jackson. It was the first studio album from the band in 14 years and their first after reforming from being broken up for a decade, coming back with this album being funded by PledgeMusic; it has received positive reviews from critics.

== Reception ==
According to the review aggregator Metacritic, Magic Hour received "generally favorable reviews" based on a weighted average score of 67 out of 100 from 8 critic scores. At The A. V. Club, Chris Mincher gave this album a C− and praised the band for avoiding the temptation to sound too modern, but stating that the resulting work is "relatively simple, at times almost amateurish". Editors at AllMusic rated this album 4 out of 5 stars, with critic Stephen Thomas Erlewine writing that "the lower budget can't help but bring to mind the group's lo-fi beginnings" and the music also "recall[s] the noir funk of 1992's In Search of Manny" and he finished by stating that the "result is terrific, a record that builds upon the group's legacy and is easily the equal of anything the band did in the '90s". In CMJ New Music Report, Eric Davidson stated that there are minor complaints such as how "there are few odd turns or possibly embarrassing (daring?) missteps here that might’ve added some urgent energy and help create a little more discussion around this comeback" and stated that the band's genre blending and musicianship "work together perfectly, still and always, apparently". Ann Powers of NPR stated that "the group gives instructions in fun, love, loyalty and self-appreciation with ten songs that go down as easy as drummer Kate Schellenbach's backbeats" on this release and is "timeless" music.

Editors at Pitchfork scored this release 5.6 out of 10 and critic Douglas Wolk characterized it as "just a return to very familiar territory without the urgency and mystery of Luscious Jackson's 90s-era music" that he considers not being an obvious cash-grab and sounding like it was fun for the musicians to make. Writing for PopMatters, Sean McCarthy rated this release a 6 out of 10, stating that it "goes easy on the ears" and the musicianship is high quality but criticized the songwriting stating that "almost all of the songs feel like they’re taking place within the confines of a dance floor". In Record Collector, Magic Hour received 4 out of 5 stars and Kris Needs wrote that it was good to have the band back, as "Luscious Jackson return as a welcome blast of old school New York grit, happily still brandishing their smouldering, idiosyncratic magic". Will Hermes of Rolling Stone gave this work 3.5 out of 4 stars, writing that "on this tight, 10-song reunion... vocals still waver charmingly off-key, grooves still conjure a Nineties Lower East Side rent party" and he welcomed the band back to recording. Magic Hour was album of the week in the South China Morning Post, where Jon Pareles stated that it "doesn't discourage nostalgia for an era of teasing, non-bombastic dance music [b]ut it doesn't depend entirely on nostalgia either: there's always another catchy refrain on the way".

== Track listing ==
All songs written by Jill Cunniff, Gabrielle Glaser, and Kate Schellenbach, except where noted

1. "You and Me" – 3:03
2. "#1 Bum" – 2:52
3. "Show Us What You Got" – 2:41
4. "Are You Ready?" (Cunniff, Glaser, and ADW Young) – 2:53
5. "Aaw Turn It Up!" (Cunniff, Glaser, Adam Horowitz, and Shellenbach) – 2:44
6. "So Rock On" – 3:37
7. "Love Is Alive" – 3:14
8. "We Go Back" – 3:07
9. "Frequency" (Cunniff and Schellenbach) – 3:10
10. "3 Seconds to Cross" – 3:59

== Personnel ==
Luscious Jackson

- Jill Cunniff – guitar, bass guitar, vocals, recording, programming, production
- Gabrielle Glaser – guitar, keyboards, vocals, production
- Kate Schellenbach – drums

Additional personnel

- AdamLewin.com – artwork
- Gabriele Corcos – percussion on "You and Me", "Love Is Alive", and "3 Seconds to Cross"
- Darren Embry – recording on drums
- Piper Gregoire – "are we just dancing" vocal on "Frequency"
- Adam Horovitz – production on "So Rock On"
- Jim Kissling – mixing on "Are You Ready?"
- Peter Mayer – violin on "So Rock On"
- Lara Meyerratken – keyboards on "You and Me" and "We Go Back", backing vocals on "So Rock On"
- Doug Seymour – photography
- Jamie Staub – mixing, additional production
- ADW Young – production on "Aaw Turn It Up!"

== See also ==
- 2013 in American music
- 2013 in rock music
- List of 2013 albums
