= Klassics with a "K" =

Studio album by Kostars
- Released: April 29, 1996
- Recorded: January 1995
- Studios: Meat and Potatoes (New York City)
- Genres: Electronic rock, ambient pop
- Label: Grand Royal

Alternative cover
- Cover of "Hey Cowboy" 7-inch single

Professional ratings
Review scores
| Source | Rating |
|---|---|
| Allmusic | 4/5 stars |

Klassics with a "K", was the only full-length album by Kostars, a side project of Luscious Jackson members Vivian Trimble and Jill Cunniff, released in 1996 on Grand Royal.

Fellow Luscious Jackson members Kate Schellenbach and Gabby Glaser contributed drums and lead guitar, respectively, to the album. Both Dean and Gene Ween of Ween contributed as well. The album was engineered by Josephine Wiggs, bass player of the Breeders, marking her first full-length engineering project. It was recorded and mixed in 25 days at Meat and Potatoes Studio, a 16-track home studio put together in the Luscious Jackson rehearsal room.

The duo's only other release was a 7-inch single of the track "Hey Cowboy".

== Track listing ==
1. "Never So Lonely" (Jill Cunniff, Vivian Trimble) – 3:30
2. "Jacqueline" (Cunniff, Trimble) – 3:33
3. "Red Umbrella" (Cunniff, Trimble) – 3:58
4. "Jolene on the Freeway" (Cunniff) – 3:23
5. "One Sunny Day" (Trimble) – 4:07
6. "Hey Cowboy" (Trimble) – 4:49
7. "Reverend" (Cunniff, Trimble) – 2:59
8. "Mama Never Said" (Cunniff) – 3:54
9. "Don't Know Why" (Trimble) – 3:47
10. "French Kiss" (Cunniff) – 2:47

== Personnel ==
Kostars

- Jill Cunniff – accordion, bass guitar, acoustic guitar, electric guitar, vocals, wah wah guitar
- Vivian Trimble – ARP synthesizer, Casio, acoustic guitar, Moog synthesizer, Multivox, piano, vocals

Additional musicians

- Gabrielle Glaser – electric guitar
- Kate Schellenbach – drum machine, drums, percussion
- Niko Tavernise – trumpet, vocals
- Dean Ween – electric guitar, vocals
- Gene Ween – electric guitar, vocals
- Tuta Aquino – sequencing

Technical

- Kostars – co-producers
- Josephine Wiggs – engineer, mixing, co-producer
- Kate Schellenbach – assistant engineer, mixing assistant
- Wally Traugott – mastering
- Danny Clinch – photography
- Robert Schroeder – design
- Jack Torso – liner notes

== "Hey Cowboy" 7-inch ==
Side one

1. "Hey Cowboy"

Side two

1. "French Kiss"
2. "Don't Know Why (You Went Away)" (Special 7-inch Mix)
- AMG Track listing info
