= Honey Tongue =

British alternative rock band

- Promotional photo from 1992

Background information
- Also known as: The Josephine Wiggs Experience
- Origin: London, England
- Genres: Alternative rock
- Years active: 1992–1996
- Labels: Playtime, Grand Royal
- Past members: Josephine Wiggs; Jon Mattock

Honey Tongue were an alternative rock band formed by former member of The Perfect Disaster and The Breeders Josephine Wiggs (vocals, guitar, cello) and The Perfect Disaster/Spacemen 3/Spiritualized drummer Jon Mattock. The band later recorded as The Josephine Wiggs Experience.

== History ==
The band was initially intended as a one-off project while Wiggs and Mattock continued with their other bands. Wiggs had met Mattock when she added cello to tracks for Spacemen 3's Playing With Fire album, and Mattock had played drums on The Perfect Disaster's Heaven Scent album. The duo formed Honey Tongue in April 1991 and began recording demos. Nude Nudes was recorded in December 1991 with Audu Obaje (formerly a member of Collapse) producing, and released in 1992, which was their only album released as Honey Tongue, although the same line-up (with Obaje also on guitar) released the Bon Bon Lifestyle album as The Josephine Wiggs Experience in 1996.

== Discography ==
- Nude Nudes (1992), Playtime
- Bon-Bon Lifestyle (1996), Grand Royal – as The Josephine Wiggs Experience
