= List of Grand Royal artists =

This is a list of the artists who recorded for Grand Royal.

- Derek Allan
- Alec Empire
- Atari Teenage Riot
- At the Drive-In
- Bash Ton
- Beastie Boys
- Big Fat Love
- Bis
- Bran Van 3000
- BS 2000
- Buffalo Daughter
- Butter 08
- Dead Fucking Last
- De Facto
- EC8OR
- DJ Hurricane
- Jimmy Eat World
- Kostars
- Ladies Who Lunch
- Ben Lee
- Sean Lennon
- Liquid Liquid
- Luscious Jackson
- Mika Bomb
- Mr. Lif
- Moistboyz
- Money Mark
- Noise Addict
- Nullset
- The Prunes
- Rosita
- Russell Simins
- Scapegoat Wax
- Shizuo
- Siud
- DJ Strictnine & Paranorm
- Sukpatch
- Techno Animal
- The Josephine Wiggs Experience
- The Latch Brothers

== See also ==
- Grand Royal
