= At Home with the Groovebox =

Compilation album by various artists
- Released: 1999
- Genre: Techno
- Label: Grand Royal

Professional ratings
Review scores
Source	Rating
AllMusic	3/5 stars
NME	6/10

At Home With the Groovebox is a 1999 compilation album released on Grand Royal records.

== Track listing ==
1. Jean-Jacques Perrey – "The Groovy Leprechauns"
2. Buffalo Daughter – "303 + 606 = ACID"
3. John McEntire – "J.I.H.A.D."
4. Air – "Planet Vega"
5. Pavement – "Robyn Turns 26"
6. Money Mark – "Insects Are All Around Us"
7. Beck – "Boyz"
8. Sean Lennon – "Winged Elephants"
9. Gershon Kingsley – "Popcorn"
10. Sonic Youth – "Campfire"
11. Bis – "Oh My"
12. Cibo Matto – "We Love Our Lawyers"
13. Bonnie "Prince" Billy – "Today I Am Celebrating Again"
14. Dick Hyman – "Glass Slipper"
15. Pavement – "Watch Out"
16. Gershon Kingsley – "Popcorn Instrumental"

== See also ==
- List of Grand Royal artists
