= Naked Eye (Luscious Jackson song) =

1996 single by Luscious Jackson

Single by Luscious Jackson

from the album Fever In Fever Out
- B-side: "Banana's Box"; "Foster's Lover"
- Released: October 1, 1996
- Genre: Alternative rock; funk rock
- Length: 4:40
- Label: Grand Royal; Capitol
- Songwriter: Jill Cunniff
- Producers: Daniel Lanois; Tony Mangurian; Luscious Jackson

Luscious Jackson singles chronology
| "Here" (1995) | "Naked Eye" (1996) | "Under Your Skin" (1997) |

Music video
- "Naked Eye" on YouTube

"Naked Eye" is a song by American alternative rock band Luscious Jackson, released as the first single from their second album, Fever In Fever Out (1996). It was released on CD and 12-inch, both of which feature three remixes and an instrumental version of the song as well as two non-LP tracks. The song peaked at No. 18 on the US Billboard Modern Rock Tracks chart and No. 36 on the Billboard Hot 100. As of 2026, it is the band's only top-40 hit in the United Kingdom, reaching No. 25 on the UK Singles Chart.

== Background ==
In a 1997 interview with Billboard, singer Jill Cunniff explained that the song is about being emotionally naked, or honest, rather than naked as in without clothing.

== Music video ==
The song's music video was inspired by the 1977 Luis Buñuel film That Obscure Object of Desire, which featured two actresses playing the same role. All four of the band's then members (Cunniff, Gabrielle Glaser, Kate Schellenbach and Vivian Trimble) portray the same character, a woman escorting her boyfriend, played by Max Perlich, to a departing aircraft. The character arrives in a Citroen CX car. Though the video is made to look like it takes place at an airport, it was filmed at New York's World Trade Center. The music video made its MTV debut on November 17, 1996.

== Track listing ==
US maxi-CD single

1. "Naked Eye" – 4:40
2. "Banana's Box" – 3:10
3. "Naked Eye" (Tony's Magic mix) – 5:13
4. "Naked Eye" (20/20 mix) – 5:42
5. "Naked Eye" (Totally Nude mix) – 5:13
6. "Foster's Lover" – 2:42
7. "Naked Eye" (Suntan Knee-Hi mix—instrumental) – 4:38

== Charts ==
=== Weekly charts ===
| Chart (1997) | Peak position |
|---|---|
| Australia (ARIA) | 64 |
| Scotland Singles (OCC) | 27 |
| UK Singles (OCC) | 25 |
| US Billboard Hot 100 | 36 |
| US Adult Top 40 (Billboard) | 33 |
| US Modern Rock Tracks (Billboard) | 18 |
| US Top 40/Mainstream (Billboard) | 24 |

=== Year-end charts ===
| Chart (1997) | Position |
|---|---|
| US Billboard Hot 100 | 81 |
| US Modern Rock Tracks (Billboard) | 55 |
| US Top 40/Mainstream (Billboard) | 75 |

== Release history ==
| Region | Date | Format(s) | Label(s) | Ref. |
|---|---|---|---|---|
| United States | October 1, 1996 | College radio; 12-inch promotional club vinyl; maxi-CD | Grand Royal; Capitol | |
| United States | December 3, 1996 | Rhythmic contemporary; contemporary hit radio | Grand Royal; Capitol | |
| Japan | December 4, 1996 | CD | Grand Royal | |
| United Kingdom | March 31, 1997 | 12-inch vinyl; CD | Grand Royal; Capitol | |
