= Natural Ingredients =

1994 studio album by Luscious Jackson

Studio album by Luscious Jackson
- Released: August 23, 1994
- Recorded: 1993–1994
- Studio: Tony's, New York City
- Genre: Alternative rock
- Length: 45:04
- Label: Grand Royal; Capitol
- Producer: The Superfreaks (Jill Cunniff, Gabrielle Glaser, Tony Mangurian); Kate Schellenbach

Luscious Jackson chronology
In Search of Manny (1992)	Natural Ingredients (1994)	Fever In Fever Out (1996)

Singles from Natural Ingredients
- 1. "Citysong" Released: July 12, 1994; 2. "Deep Shag" Released: 1994; 3. "Here" Released: 1995

Natural Ingredients is the debut studio album by American alternative rock band Luscious Jackson. It was released on August 23, 1994, by Grand Royal and Capitol Records.

The album peaked at number 114 on the Billboard 200 chart, as well as number 2 on the Heatseekers Albums chart.

== Critical reception ==
Professional ratings
Review scores
Source	Rating
AllMusic	3/5 stars
Chicago Tribune	3.5/4 stars
Entertainment Weekly	B+
Los Angeles Times	3/4 stars
NME	8/10
Q	3/5 stars
Rolling Stone	4/5 stars
Select	2/5 stars
Spin Alternative Record Guide	6/10
The Village Voice	B−

The New York Times concluded: "Both warm and sardonic, Natural Ingredients is music that captures the feeling of hitting the pavement on a near-perfect day, absorbing the urban rhythms while still keeping a wary eye on everything happening around you."

== Track listing ==
All songs composed by Jill Cunniff and Gabrielle Glaser, except "Surprise", by Jill Cunniff.

1. "Intro" – 0:05
2. "Citysong" – 4:20
3. "Deep Shag" – 3:32
4. "Angel" – 3:19
5. "Strongman" – 4:21
6. "Energy Sucker" – 3:33
7. "Here" – 3:33
8. "Intermission" – 0:14
9. "Find Your Mind" – 3:21
10. "Pelé Merengue" – 2:24
11. "Rock Freak" – 3:53
12. "Rollin'" – 4:14
13. "Surprise" – 2:46
14. "LP Retreat" – 5:29
- "Citysong" contains elements from "On and On" by Curtis Mayfield, performed by Gladys Knight & the Pips.

== Personnel ==
Luscious Jackson

- Jill Cunniff – vocals (tracks 2–7, 9–14), bass guitar (2–5, 7, 9–12, 14), guitar (6, 13)
- Gabrielle Glaser – vocals (2, 3, 5–7, 9–11, 14), bass guitar (2, 10, 13), guitar (3, 5, 7, 9, 11, 12, 14), Rhodes piano (3, 14), acoustic guitar (4), electric guitar (4), whammy-guitar (6), shaker (7), drum programming (11)
- Vivian Trimble – piano (3–5, 7, 12, 13), wah-piano (4), wah-percussion (10), keyboard bass (11), Fender Rhodes (12), backing vocals (13)
- Kate Schellenbach – drums (2–5, 7, 10–13), shaker (3, 4)

Technical

- Jill Cunniff – co-producer
- Gabrielle Glaser – co-producer
- Tony Mangurian – co-producer, engineer, mixing
- Kate Schellenbach – co-producer ("Strongman")
- Paul Orofino – mixing
- Tom Baker – mastering
- Tuta Aquino – editing, sequencing
- George Sewell – artwork
- Twelve Point Rule Ltd. – design
- Bryan Thatcher – cloud photo
- Michael Lavine – back cover band photos
- C.H.M. – inside photos

== Charts ==
Chart (1994)	Peak position
US Billboard 200	114
US Heatseekers Albums (Billboard)	2
