= City Beach =

City Beach can refer to:

- Urban beach, a modern leisure concept
- City Beach, Western Australia, a suburb of Perth, Western Australia
- City Beach (album), 2007 album by Jill Cunniff
