= Felaheen =

Felaheen may mean:

- The plural of fellah, a class roughly equal to peasant in the Middle East and North Africa
- Felaheen is the third novel in Jon Courtenay Grimwood's Arabesk trilogy
- Fellaheen Records was an Australian independent record label in the 1990s.
