= In Search of Manny =

EP by Luscious Jackson
- Released: 1992
- Genre: Alternative rock; alternative hip hop
- Length: 24:00
- Label: Grand Royal

Luscious Jackson chronology
In Search of Manny (1992)	Natural Ingredients (1994)

Professional ratings
Review scores
Source	Rating
AllMusic	4.5/5 stars
Chicago Tribune	3.5/4 stars
The Encyclopedia of Popular Music	3/5 stars
Entertainment Weekly	C
MusicHound Rock: The Essential Album Guide	4/5 stars
The New Rolling Stone Album Guide	4/5 stars
Spin Alternative Record Guide	8/10
Select	4/5 stars

In Search of Manny is the debut extended play by American alternative rock band Luscious Jackson. The EP was released in 1992 on Grand Royal. It is essentially the band's demo tape, released after Mike D of Beastie Boys heard a copy. It was the label's first release.

== Recording ==
The majority of the album was recorded by Jill Cunniff and Gabrielle Glaser, with Vivian Trimble and Kate Schellenbach appearing on only two tracks.

== Critical reception ==
MusicHound Rock: The Essential Album Guide wrote that the EP "blends girl group pop, hip-hop rhythms, and smooth urban attitude into a unique stew." The Spin Alternative Record Guide called the songs "sweet and sleazy, irradiated by Cunniff's honeyed vocals and Glaser's glacial sass."

== Track listing ==
1. Let Yourself Get Down – 3:39
2. Life of Leisure – 5:11
3. Daughters of the Kaos – 3:47
4. Keep On Rockin' It – 3:39
5. She Be Wantin' It More – 2:52
6. Bam-Bam – 2:21
7. Satellite – 2:49

== Personnel ==
Luscious Jackson

- Kate Schellenbach – drums (tracks 6–7)
- Vivian Trimble – keyboards (tracks 6–7)
- Gabrielle Glaser – performer (tracks 1–5); guitar (tracks 6–7)
- Jill Cunniff – performer (tracks 1–5); bass guitar (tracks 6–7)

Additional musicians

- Danny Millings – extra voice (track 2)
- Frankie Calalucci – extra voice (track 1)

Technical

- Jill Cunniff – arranger
- Gabrielle Glaser – arranger
- Tony Mangurian – engineer (tracks 1–5)
- Noah Evans – engineer (tracks 6–7)
- Estelle Glaser – front photos
- Rhana Harris – back photos
- George Sewell – logo, graffiti
- Simon Curtis – layout
- Tom Baker – mastering
