= Citysong =

1994 single by Luscious Jackson

Single by Luscious Jackson

from the album Natural Ingredients
- B-side: "Energy Sucker", "Radiating"
- Released: July 12, 1994
- Genre: Alternative rock
- Length: 4:20
- Label: Grand Royal
- Songwriter(s): Jill Cunniff; Gabby Glaser; Laurie Anderson; Curtis Mayfield
- Producer(s): Jill Cunniff; Gabby Glaser; Tony Mangurian

Luscious Jackson singles chronology
"Let Yourself Get Down" (1994)	"Citysong" (1994)	"Deep Shag" (1994)

Music video
- "Citysong" on YouTube

"Citysong" is a song performed by American alternative rock group Luscious Jackson, issued as the lead single from their debut studio album Natural Ingredients. It was commissioned as a double single with "Deep Shag" in some markets; and it includes a sample of "On and On" by Gladys Knight & the Pips. Co-written and co-produced by group members Jill Cunniff and Gabby Glaser, the song peaked at #39 on the Billboard Alternative Songs chart in 1994.

On January 14, 1995, Luscious Jackson performed "Citysong" on Saturday Night Live.

== Music video ==
The official music video for "Citysong" was directed by Tamra Davis.

== Chart positions ==
Chart (1994)	Peak position
UK Singles Chart	69
US Modern Rock Tracks (Billboard)	39
