= Tamra Davis =

American film/television/music video director (born 1962)

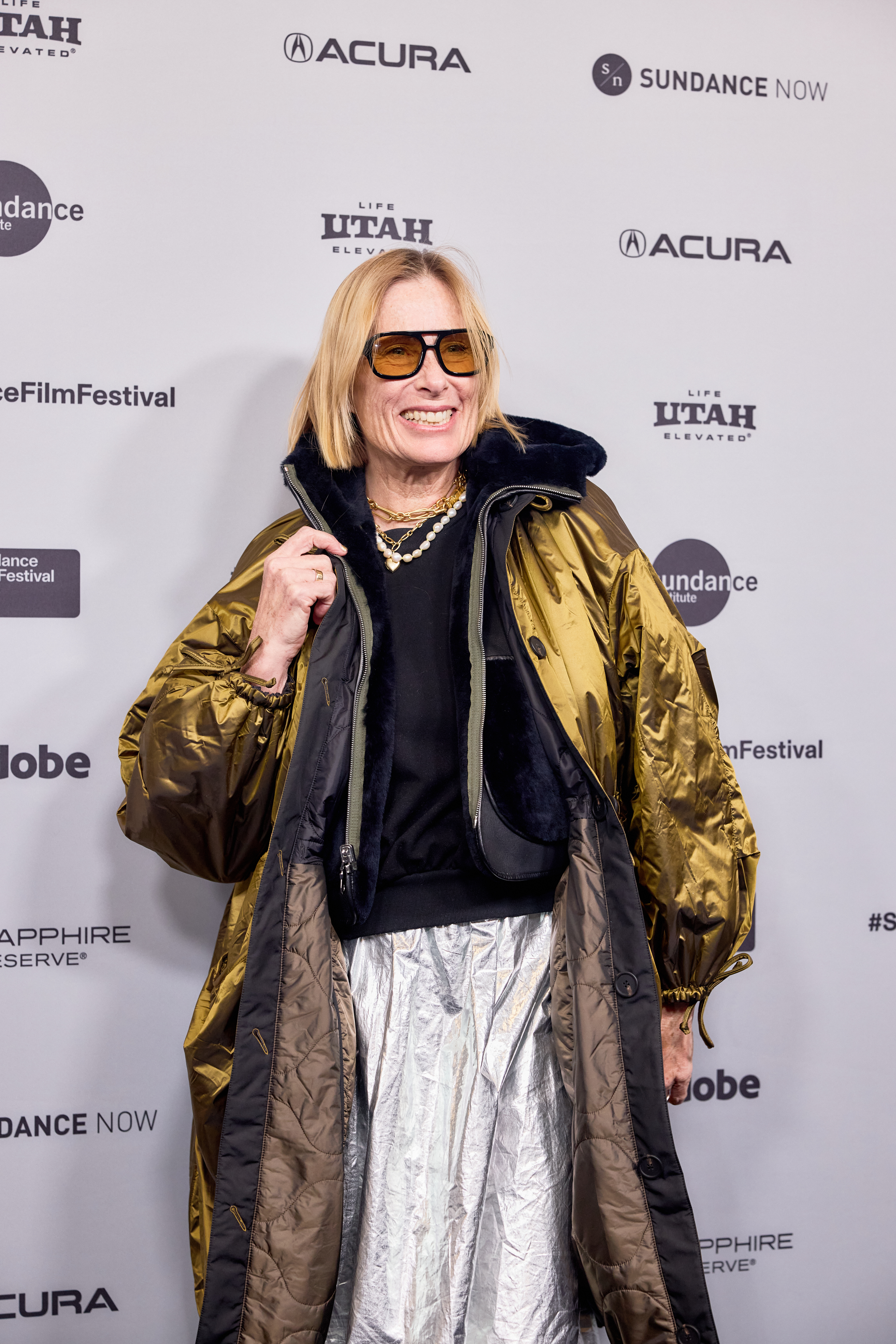
- Davis at the 2026 Sundance Film Festival
- Born: January 22, 1962 (age 64); Studio City, California, U.S.
- Education: Los Angeles City College
- Occupation: Director
- Years active: 1986–present
- Spouse: Michael Diamond (m. 1993; sep. 2016)
- Children: 2

Tamra Davis (born January 22, 1962) is an American film, television and music video director.

== Early life ==
Davis was born the second of four children in Studio City, California. She was exposed to the media industry at an early age by her grandfather, a comedy writer, and her grandmother, an actress at Fox. Davis and her family constantly watched films and she aspired to become an actress. In 11th grade, Davis dropped out of high school and met Egyptian film producer Ibrahim Moussa. He took Davis to Italy for six months to work.

Returning to the U.S., Davis worked at an art gallery, but soon quit to work at American Zoetrope in an apprentice position. The studio was struggling to complete Francis Ford Coppola's One from the Heart; the hectic schedule allowed Davis to study Coppola's directing and the business. Coppola suggested to Davis that she go to school. She then attended Los Angeles City College.

== Career ==
Davis first shot a film using a super 8 mm camera during her time at Los Angeles City College.

As soon as she got out of school, Davis sent out a package of her videos, and was hired to do a video for the band Hüsker Dü. She states that music videos "played a huge role in developing my sensibility as a director. There's much less sexism in the video world and they're open to women. But more important, with video you're always being pushed to experiment and come up with something new." Over her career, Davis directed over 155 music videos. While working at MTV, Davis was encouraged to engage in her empathy towards multicultural and feminist issues. Christina Lane stated in her book Feminist Hollywood: From Born in Flames to Point Break that as a person who was knowledgeable on feminist politics, Davis wanted to empower young women to feel good about their sexuality. Lane also mentioned that Davis used her platform to voice feminist ideas and empower girls.

A writer at the Los Angeles Times reported, "Over the past seven years, Tamra Davis has made a name for herself directing cutting-edge videos for some of the thorniest acts in popular music. As director of choice for performers such as N.W.A, Sonic Youth, and Black Flag."

Davis participated in the Polygram Video program called No Alternative: A benefit for AIDS, education and relief which had a section in their program where multiple independent film directors created a series of short films. In this program, she directed a short film called "No Alternative Girls" which discussed gender inequality.

Davis also directed Guncrazy (1992), a film which starred actor Drew Barrymore. This film was a remake of the 50s film Gun Crazy. Many books and articles have stated that her film had similar elements to Bonnie and Clyde. Christina Lane acknowledged the mixed reviews for Davis' film. Lane wrote that some thought the film was too violent and others said the violence was necessary for the story she was telling. When asked about the violence of the film Davis said she did it because she wanted a strong emotional reaction from the audience. In the book, Davis expressed that she was not cautious when it came to her audiences’ emotions. Davis stated, "I wanted to say something about how our society abuses people and yet gives them violent possibilities to turn that abuse back onto society." Before the production of the film, Davis researched reactions teenagers had to sexual abuse. She also looked at how a teenage girl's everyday life changed after the abuse.

Davis is also known for directing films such as Jean-Michel Basquiat: The Radiant Child, CB4, Billy Madison, and Half Baked and television shows such as My Name Is Earl and Everybody Hates Chris. She also directed the film Crossroads, starring Britney Spears.

While directing a scene in the film Billy Madison in which Adam Sandler's character throws dodgeballs at children, Davis says she was told by Sandler that he planned to throw the balls hard and genuinely hurt the children. He did so, with parental permission, and she described the resulting scene as "a full-on assault" adding that every shot needed to be cut because the children were crying.

Rupert Wainwright was originally asked to direct CB4. Davis was their second choice after Wainwright turned the project down. According to Gwendolyn Audrey Foster, the comedy made fun of the seriousness and sexism of rap music videos while also taking a look at how Hollywood has misused African-American culture in the industry. Foster also examined that Davis was not part of the writing of this film. However, it was noted that she did add her own knowledge of music videos, rap, and politics into the film. Feminist Hollywood: From Born in Flames to Point Break discussed difficulties Davis had with the production of the film. There was a limited time to film, the filming conditions were difficult due to the heat, and the script was changed often. The book also mentioned that Davis speaks highly of her time working on CB4. Foster wrote in her book, Women Film Directors: An International Bio-Critical Dictionary, that this film proved Davis' skills as a comedy director.

According to an article in The New York Times, Davis had trouble finding a good location for the Western film she was originally supposed to direct, Bad Girls (1994). Many sources state that the studio disagreed with the feminist approach Davis was taking for the film Bad Girls (1994). According to multiple sources, many producers were in disagreement with what Davis wanted within the film. Lane revealed that the budget given was not enough to provide Davis with the equipment she needed. In the end, Davis was replaced with director Jonathan Kaplan. With the new director, the script was rewritten and the earlier footage was abandoned.

Currently, Davis has a cooking show showcasing vegetarian fare, Tamra Davis Cooking Show, which is accessible on her website. She also wrote a cookbook titled Make Me Something Good to Eat.

== Personal life ==
Davis married Mike D of the Beastie Boys in 1993. As of 2018, they are legally separated.

== Bibliography ==
- Make Me Something Good to Eat (2009)

== Filmography ==
=== Film ===
- Guncrazy (1992)
- CB4 (1993)
- Bad Girls (Note: Removed from production during filming; footage scrapped) (1994)
- No Alternative Girls (1994)
- Billy Madison (1995)
- Best Men (1997)
- Half Baked (1998)
- Skipped Parts (2000) (also executive producer)
- Crossroads (2002)
- 13: The Musical (2022)

Ref.:

Documentary film

Year	Title	Director	Producer
2002	Keep Your Eyes Open	Yes	No
2006	A Conversation with Basquiat	Yes	No
2010	Jean-Michel Basquiat: The Radiant Child	Yes	Yes
2013	The Punk Singer	No	Yes
2024	Larger Than Life: Reign of the Boybands	Yes	No
2026	The Best Summer	Yes	Yes

=== Television ===
Year	Title	Notes
2004	Method & Red	1 episode
2005	My Name Is Earl	1 episode
2006	Everybody Hates Chris	1 episode
2006	Love Monkey	2 episodes
2006	Men in Trees	1 episode
2007	Ugly Betty	1 episode
2007	Grey's Anatomy	1 episode
2008	The Ex List	1 episode
2010	Sons of Tucson	1 episode
2011	Single Ladies	21 episodes (Also executive producer)
2013	Hit the Floor	5 episodes
2015	Odd Mom Out	2 episodes
2015	Crazy Ex-Girlfriend	1 episode
2015	Younger	4 episodes
2016	Still the King	3 episodes
2016	Mary + Jane	2 episodes
2016	Dirk Gently's Holistic Detective Agency	2 episodes
2017	Santa Clarita Diet	1 episode
2017	Star	2 episodes
2017	Daytime Divas	1 episode
2017	You're the Worst	3 episodes
2017	Kevin (Probably) Saves the World	1 episode
2018	Alone Together	5 episodes
2018	Empire	1 episode
2018	God Friended Me	1 episode
2019	Future Man	2 episodes
2019	Valley of the Boom	1 episode
2019	High School Musical: The Musical: The Series	3 episodes
2020	Miracle Workers	1 episode
2020	Dead to Me	2 episodes
2020	The Politician	1 episode
2020	Stargirl	1 episode
2020	P-Valley	1 episode
2022	Good Sam	1 episode
2023	The Afterparty	2 episodes

=== Music video ===
Year	Title	Artist	Notes
1986	"But Not Tonight"	Depeche Mode	
1986	"Baby Ran"	54-40	
1987	"Shoplifters of the World Unite"	The Smiths	
1987	"Sheila Take a Bow"	The Smiths	
1988	"Anne's Song"	Faith No More	
1988	"In Your Room"	The Bangles	
1988	"Wild Thing"	Tone Lōc	
1989	"Closer to Fine"	Indigo Girls	
1989	"It's Funky Enough"	The D.O.C.	
1989	"The D.O.C. & The Doctor"	The D.O.C.	
1989	"Cha Cha Cha"	MC Lyte	
1989	"Bust a Move"	Young MC	
1989	"Principal's Office"	Young MC	
1990	"From a Distance"	Bette Midler	
1990	"Kool Thing"	Sonic Youth	
1991	"Call It What You Want"	New Kids on the Block	
1991	"Dirty Boots"	Sonic Youth	
1992	"Netty's Girl"	Beastie Boys	
1992	"100%"	Sonic Youth	with Spike Jonze
1992	"Daughters of the Kaos"	Luscious Jackson	
1993	"I Got You Babe"	Cher with Beavis and Butt-Head	
1993	"It's About Time"	The Lemonheads	
1994	"Big Gay Heart"	The Lemonheads	
1994	"Bull in the Heather"	Sonic Youth	
1994	"Citysong"	Luscious Jackson	
1995	"I Dig You"	Boss Hog	
1995	"Pacer"	The Amps	
1995	"Away with the Pixies"	Ben Lee	
1995	"All Hail Me"	Veruca Salt	
1995	"Kiss and Tell"	G. Love & Special Sauce	
1997	"MMMBop"	Hanson	
1997	"Drawer"	Summercamp	
1997	"Where's the Love"	Hanson	
1998	"Boy You Knock Me Out"	Tatyana Ali	
1999	"Ladyfingers"	Luscious Jackson	
2001	"Movies"	Alien Ant Farm	
