= Budd (band) =

Australian rock band

- Origin: Brisbane, Queensland, Australia
- Genres: Stoner rock, grunge, noise rock, alternative rock
- Years active: 1991–present
- Labels: Ecstatic Peace!, Fellaheen
- Members: Jeremy Finlayson
- Past members: Craig Westwood; Tom Jackman; Gary Linaker "Gaz"; Jon Morris "Jon"; Ngakau Luke-Harris; David Nicholson "Nico"; Peter Lee "Pete"; Matt Tanner "Tanzie"; Nadia Markovic "Budd"; Lenny Markovic "Budd"; Campbell Robinson; Ian Mossom; Nathan Smith; Finn McCarthy; Owen Kruse; Cris Wilson; Kerrie Hickin "Kez"

Budd are an Australian rock band originally from Brisbane. They were originally signed to Fellaheen Records in the 1990s.

== Career ==
Budd formed in 1991 in Brisbane, Australia. Although their lineup changed through the years, founding member and guitarist Jeremy Finlayson has remained in the group throughout and continues to perform as Budd in 2024.

In 1992, they were announced as being signed to Waterfront Records. Instead, they released their first single "Helpmeswell" as the first release on Fellaheen, another label run by Waterfront founder Steven Stavrakis.

Four of their EPs released by Fellaheen Records entered the ARIA Alternative Top 20 charts, but when their label closed down, Budd became viewed as more of a "cult" underground band, with their releases becoming "obscure collectors' items".

When two of the original members left, Budd regrouped and released the Ovit EP in 1996 - they were likened to American metal band Helmet, a comparison the band rejected.

Two members of the band also played in Slugfest, a rock band that also included members of Screamfeeder.

After relocating to Melbourne, Jeremy Finlayson reformed Budd with new lineups and released the albums Prana (on Fellaheen through Shock) in 1998, and the independently-released Jawa in 2009.

In 2015, their 1993 MLP Yakfat was re-released as a limited vinyl pressing, - to support this, the original lineup of Budd regrouped to perform around Brisbane. In 2024, Jeremy Finlayson revived Budd with a new lineup, again based in Melbourne.

Although many of their original releases on Fellaheen only came out on CD, Budd said in 2024 that their aim is to reissue their entire catalogue onto vinyl. They also announced that Budd have new material to release in the future.

== Discography ==
=== Albums ===
Year	Album details
1991	Fuzzgutzn: Released: 1991; Label: Self released; Format: CD
1994	Budd: Released: Sep 1994; Label: Ecstatic Peace!; Format: double 10"
1998	Prana: Released: Sep 1998; Label: Fellaheen Records; Format: CD
2009	Jawa: Released: Oct 2009; Label: Self released; Format: CD

=== EPs ===
List of EPs as lead artist, with selected chart positions and certifications
Year	Title	Peak chart positions	Notes
Year	Title	AUS	Notes
1992	"Helpmeswell"	20	Charted in the ARIA Alternative Top 20 Singles
1993	"Yakfat"	3	Charted in the ARIA Alternative Top 20 Singles
1994	"Naf'"	19	Charted in the ARIA Alternative Top 20 Albums
1996	"Ovit"	3	Charted in the ARIA Alternative Top 20 Singles
1999	"Naf/Ovit"	-	Compilation with two previous singles collected
