= Sara L. Press =

American book artist and photographer (born 1974)

Sara L. Press (born November 28, 1974) is an American book artist and photographer.

Press graduated from Columbia University in 1997, and trained at San Francisco Art Institute, receiving her M.F.A. in printmaking and photography in 2006. She resides in Northern California.

Press' work, under the imprint Deeply Game Publications, is represented in the permanent collections of several notable rare book libraries and museums, including Stanford University special collections, the Boston Museum of Fine Arts, the Corcoran Gallery, Harvard's Houghton Library, the San Francisco Museum of Modern Art, the National Portrait Gallery in Washington D.C., and the Walker Art Center. The Library of Congress Rare Books and Special Collections Division has three of her books: The Wolf-girl of Midnapore, Predator/Prey, and A Deeply Game Dog: the Sweet Science of Breeding Champions. Her commercial photography includes album covers for No-Neck Blues Band, Dusty Trails; book jacket art for Barney Rosset's imprint, Blue Moon Books; and magazine covers for Heeb.

Press' book art, combining letterpress typography with visual media such as etchings, photography, and silk screen, often explores areas of overlap between human and animal worlds. The books use both found and original texts.
