= Cooler Kids =

American pop group

- Sisely Treasure and Kaz Gamble

Background information
- Origin: Brooklyn, New York, United States
- Genres: Pop, house, electro
- Years active: 2002–2005
- Label: DreamWorks Records
- Past members: Kaz Gamble; Sisely Treasure; Jill Cunniff

Cooler Kids were a pop group from Brooklyn, New York, formed in 2002 by producer Kaz Gamble, vocalist Sisely Treasure, and former Luscious Jackson singer & bassist Jill Cunniff.

They were signed to DreamWorks Records.

The idea for the group came during an e-mail correspondence that began with a fan message from Treasure, who lived in California, to Gamble in New York. The duo began working on music with Cunniff, whose role was described as "muse/sage/groove godmother", and production team Pop-Rox.

In 2003, the group joined Erasure on their North American tour and, in an attempt to raise their profile among gay listeners, took a float in New York City's gay pride parade. They then recorded the tracks "Dreams Can Be" and "Welcome Home" for the video game Monster Rancher 4.

Punk Debutante was their only studio album, released on July 1, 2003, to mixed reviews. Rolling Stone gave the album two stars out of five, remarking, "The boogie's is in their hearts, but with too many same-y beats, the Cooler Kids get stuck in a groove they can't get out of." A review in City Pages also expressed mixed feelings. The Honolulu Star-Bulletin was more positive, calling several of the album's tracks "examples of what perfect dance pop should sound like".

The track "All Around the World" charted on the Billboard Dance Chart and was featured in The Lizzie McGuire Movie, the pilot episode of teen drama The O.C., and the video game NHL 12. The track "Viva la Fever" was featured on the American movie D.E.B.S and the track "E Is For Everybody" was featured in the Disney Channel film Kim Possible: A Sitch In Time and on the soundtrack for the film Uptown Girls.

The group dissolved in 2005 when boygirl_ was formed as a side project, which lasted until 2008 when Treasure departed from the group to become the lead singer for rock band Shiny Toy Guns.

== See also ==
- Luscious Jackson
