= Kostars =

American rock band

- Origin: Manhattan, New York, USA
- Genres: Alternative; pop; rock; dance
- Years active: 1995–1996
- Labels: Grand Royal, Capitol
- Members: Jill Cunniff; Vivian Trimble

Kostars was an alternative/pop-rock side project formed by Vivian Trimble and Jill Cunniff while on a headlining tour with Luscious Jackson in 1995.

Trimble and Cunniff, who needed an additional outlet, wrote under the name Kostars and released the album Klassics with a "K" in 1996. The album was recorded at Luscious Jackson drummer Kate Schellenbach's home studio. It featured drums by Schellenbach and a guest guitar spot by Gabrielle Glaser (also of Luscious Jackson), as well as Gene and Dean Ween of Ween, and was engineered/recorded by Josephine Wiggs, bass player of the Breeders, marking her first full-length engineering project. A few years later, Wiggs and Trimble would release a self-titled album together as Dusty Trails.

The group released one full-length album, as well as one single for the track "Hey Cowboy", both of which were released on the Grand Royal label, the same label that released Luscious Jackson's albums. The distribution rights for the Kostars releases were subsequently sold to GR2 Records.

On April 6, 2023, it was reported that Trimble had died two days prior, on April 4, at the age of 59, due to cancer.

== Discography ==
=== Albums ===
- Klassics with a "K" (1996)

=== Singles ===
- "Hey Cowboy" (1996)

== See also ==
- Dusty Trails
- List of all-women bands
