= Steve Pavlovic =

Australian music entrepreneur (born 1966)

- Born: Stephen Pavlovic; 1966 (age 59–60); Canberra, Australia
- Occupations: Record label founder; tour promoter

Stephen Pavlovic (born 1966) is an Australian music entrepreneur. Pavlovic began promoting music tours, events and concerts in 1990. Since then he has toured artists including Nirvana, Beastie Boys, Sonic Youth, Beck, Foo Fighters, Daft Punk, The Cure, Grace Jones, LCD Soundsystem, and more. In 1998 he founded the record label Modular Recordings home to The Avalanches, Tame Impala and Cut Copy and others.

== Career ==
=== Early career ===
Pavlovic was born in Canberra in 1966 and is of Croatian descent. He began working in the music industry in the mid-1980s in Sydney managing local power pop trio The Plunderers. He also started booking live music venues (including The Palace and Landsdowne Hotel) with bands like The Celibate Rifles, Ratcat, Hummingbirds, The Clean, Straitjacket Fits and The Cruel Sea.

Widely known as "Pav", Stephen Pavlovic built a successful career as a promoter for local bands in the city of Sydney before he started touring International bands Mudhoney, Fugazi, My Bloody Valentine, The Lemonheads and Nirvana in the early 1990s. Nirvana were on tour in Australia when Nevermind went #1 on the US Billboard 200 chart in 1992 and helped to make a name for Pavlovic. Pavlovic was 25 at the time.

=== Tour promoter ===
Pavlovic followed this with a string of tours for Hole, Pavement, Smashing Pumpkins, Green Day and The Offspring. In 1995 Pavlovic launched his own festival, Summersault, headlined by The Beastie Boys, Foo Fighters, Sonic Youth, Beck and Rancid. He later followed this with tours from Pearl Jam, Ben Harper, Jack Johnson, The Jon Spencer Blues Explosion, The Yeah Yeah Yeahs, Fatboy Slim, LCD Sound System and Hot Chip.

In 2007 Pavlovic toured French electro duo Daft Punk as part of Modular's Nevereverland festival.

In 2011, Stephen was appointed curator of Vivid Live, the live music portion of the prestigious Vivid Festival in Sydney, Australia, where The Cure, Bat For Lashes, Spiritualized and Odd Future headlined.

In 2014 and 2015 he brought the Pet Shop Boys and Grace Jones respectively to Carriageworks for Modulations at Vivid Sydney. The 2014 program also included the Liars and collaboration with Sydney restaurant, Porteno and US Rockabilly label, Wild Records.

=== Record labels ===
In 1993, Pavlovic set up the Fellaheen label with business partner Steve Stavrakis. They signed bands such as Noise Addict (featuring a young Ben Lee), Gerling and Sandpit.

In 1998, upon receiving a demo tape from then unsigned Melbourne band Quentin's Brittle Bones (now known as The Avalanches), Pavlovic founded the independent record label Modular Recordings. Whilst waiting for their debut album to be finished he then signed and released both The Living End and Ben Lee debut albums within Australia, to overwhelming commercial success.

On the back of that success he released The Avalanches debut album "Since I Left You" to global critical acclaim and chart success in both Australia and the UK. Subsequently, Pavlovic signed local artists Rocket Science, Eskimo Joe, Cut Copy, The Presets, Van She and opened offices in London and New York where he signed New Young Pony Club. Pavlovic licensed international artists The Yeah Yeah Yeahs, The Klaxons, Kindness, Robyn, Jack Johnson, Whitest Boy Alive, MSTKFT for Australian releases.

Across the Modular catalogue, the label has clocked up 3 multi-platinum albums, 3 platinum albums, 13 gold albums, 1 Grammy Award and 2 Grammy Nominations, 10 ARIA awards, 4 triple j Album of the Year J Awards and 3 Australian number one albums, not to mention sold-out tours across Australia, Europe and the US for many of their artists.

In 2005 Pavlovic sold a 50% shareholding in Modular Recordings to a collective Universal group of UMA, Interscope and Island records UK.

=== Festival promoter ===
In 1995 Pavlovic launched Summersault, a touring art and music festival that toured Australia during 1995 and 1996. The festival included performances by the Beastie Boys, Foo Fighters, Sonic Youth, Pavement, Rancid, Beck and more.

The festival also hosted outsider art exhibitions in Sydney and Melbourne curated by Aaron Rose and featured artist Rita Akermann, Alex Gray, Phil Frost, Spike Jonze and Mark Gonzales.

The festival included a pre party event in Sydney and Melbourne hosted by English record label Mo Wax and featured performances from DJ Shadow, Money Mark and Attica Blues.

In 1997 and 1998 he collaborated with Adam Yauch from the Beastie Boys to organise the Australian Tibetian Freedom Concert, featuring Crowded House and many other domestic artists.

In 2007 he toured Daft Punk to Australia, creating the Nevereverland Festival a single stage event with Daft Punk, The Presets, Cut Copy, Van She, Muscles and French DJ's Busy B, Sebastion and Kavinsky.

In 2008 the festival celebrated Modular Recordings 10 year anniversary with live performances in Sydney, Melbourne and Brisbane from The Klaxons, The Presets, Whitest Boy Alive, Cut Copy, Ladyhawke, Tame Impala and Hercules and Love affair.

In 2013 Pavlovic launched the boutique FOR festival in Croatia on the island of Hvar, – the debut line-up included James Blake, Solange, James Murphy, 2manydj's, Nicolas Jaar, Tensnake, Danielle Baldelli and Tame Impala.

The 2014 edition featured Haim, Darkside, Neneh Cherry, Mark Ronson, Klaxons, Kelela, Erlend Oye, Erol Alkan, Storm Queen, Maurice Fulton and Movement.

=== Curatorial projects ===
In 2007 and 2008 he was the creative director of the English V Festival in Australia. The first year the festival was headlined by the Pixies, Beck, Pet Shop Boys, Groove Armada, Soulwax and featured many others.

In 2011 Pavlovic was invited to curate the Vivid Live festival at the Sydney Opera House. The first two years had been curated by Brian Eno; Lou Reed and Laurie Anderson. His programme set new sales and attendance records. His programme featured The Cure (performing their first 3 albums in entirety), Spiritualized, Bat for Lashes, Yo Gabba Gabba, a Chris Cunningham audio installation and a national radio show hosted daily by 2manydjs – broadcast on triple j.

Following the success of his program, in partnership with Vivid Festival and Carriageworks, Pavlovic developed Modulations. A program of food, music and art. The 2013 event featured The Pet Shop boys and a pop-up restaurant collaboration with cult kitchen Porteno and their favourite rock n roll label from LA, Wild Records.

In 2014 Pavlovic returned to Carriageworks, bringing Grace Jones, a lecture and installation by Bill Drummond from the KLF, a pop-up dining collaboration between Sydney restaurants Bondi Icebergs, Da Orazio, Fritelli Paradiso and 10 Williams St called “Italo Dinning and Disco” and hosted Italo disco legend Beppe Loda.

=== Side ventures ===
In collaboration with Mike D from The Beastie Boys in 1995, Pavlovic opened the X-Large Clothing Store in Sydney, introducing for the first time in Australia street ware labels like X- Large, Kim Gordon's X Girl, Bathing Ape, Fuct, Holmes and Hysteric Glamour.

In collaboration with his sister Mary Louise Pavlovic in 2004, Pavlovic brought English visual artist Jake Chapman, one half of the Chapman brothers, to Australia for a lecture tour.

== Legal dispute ==
In June 2015, Modular Recordings and its partner Universal Music Australia was sued by BMG Rights Management for failing to honour an agreement made over royalties from Tame Impala recordings, including the Innerspeaker and Lonerism albums and the group's self-titled EP. The proceedings and case was later dropped.

Universal Music Australia claims that on Christmas Eve 2014, Pavlovic agreed to sign a separation deal, under which he would give, without compensation, Universal his half of Modular, together with music, trademarks, websites and other assets.

Universal claimed that since then Pavlovic backed out of the deal, refusing to transfer the shares or hand over some assets. Pavlovic claimed that without signing the deed of release, the deal was never binding.

Subsequently, in July 2015, Universal sued Pavlovic. Initially, the Supreme Court of New South Wales ordered Pavlovic to sign over his 50% shareholding to Universal. In response, Pavlovic appealed the decision, and the previous judgment was unanimously overturned by the New South Wales Court of Appeal.

== Family ==
Otis Pavlovic, of Australian band Royel Otis, is Steve Pavlovic's nephew.
