= No-Neck Blues Band =

American improvisational musical collective

No Neck Blues Band
- Also known as: NNCK
- Origin: New York, NY, United States
- Genres: Experimental
- Years active: 1992–present
- Labels: Sound@One, SER, Locust Music, Revenant, New World of Sound, Ecstatic Yod, 5RC
- Members: Keith Connolly, Matt Heyner, Jason Meagher, Mico, Pat Murano, Dave Nuss, Dave Shuford
- Past members: John Fell Ryan

The No-Neck Blues Band, also known as NNCK, is a seven-member free-form improvisational musical collective from New York City. Formed in 1992, the original band was of eight members (until John Fell Ryan left to join noise group, Excepter), and has practiced weekly in a space in Harlem since. Membership includes Dave Nuss, Keith Connolly, Dave Shuford, Jason Meagher, Pat Murano, Matt Heyner, and Mico.

Members of NNCK have been involved in numerous side-projects and off-shoots, including Angelblood, Eye Contact, Izititiz, K. Salvatore, Malkuth, Enos Slaughter, Suntanama, Egypt is the Magick #, Test, Coach Fingers, D. Charles Speer & The Helix, and Under Satan's Sun.

Along with their many releases on their own label, Sound@One (or s@1, as it often appears), NNCK has released albums on Ecstatic Yod, New World of Sound, 5RC &, recently, locust music. Singles have been released on Dry Leaf Disks (UK), New World of Sound, and Ecstatic Peace. Their first studio album was Sticks and Stones May Break My Bones but Names Will Never Hurt Me, produced by Jerry Yester on John Fahey's Revenant Records after a particular interest on Fahey's part. This was followed by Qvaris on 5RC, and Embryonnck, a collaboration with the German band Embryo released on Staubgold Records. Additional releases by the band are Nine for Victor, a recording from a live performance in Quebec and a 2007 deluxe reissue of the band's privately issued "Live at Ken's Electric Lake" originally released a decade earlier (and with a first gatefold photo of the band by Sara Press).

== Discography ==
- Recorded In Public and Private (1995, Ecstatic Yod)
- Hoichoi (1996, Sound@One)
- Letters From The Earth (1998, SER/Sound@One, 2006 reissue, Very Friendly)
- Letters From The Serth (1998, SER)
- Live at Ken's Electric Lake (1998), 2007 reissue, locust music
- A Tabu Two (1998, New World of Sound)
- The Birth Of Both Worlds (1999, SER/Sound@One)
- Sticks And Stones May Break My Bones But Names Will Never Hurt Me (2001, Revenant, reissued on Sound@One)
- Intonomancy (2002, Sound@One)
- Re: Mr. A Fan (2003, Trademark of Quality)
- Ever Borneo (2003, SER/Sound@One)
- Parallel Easters (2004, Sound@One)
- Dutch Money (2004, SER/Sound@One)
- First Kingdom Of The Ghost (2004, SER/Sound@One)
- The Collective Imaginings of Quantarenius, Cook, & Co (2005, Sound@One)
- Qvaris (2005, 5RC)
- Embryonnck (2006, Staubgold)
- Nine For Victor (2006, Victo)
- Roodemas (2007, Sound@One)
- Clomeim (2008, Locust Music)
