= The Perfect Disaster =

English alternative rock band

- Origin: Bedfordshire/Hertfordshire, England
- Genre: Alternative rock
- Years active: 1980–1991
- Labels: Kampa; Glass; Fire
- Past members: Phil Parfitt; Tony Pettitt; Alexander Wright; Alison Pate; John Saltwell; Grant Davidson; Malcom Catto; Josephine Wiggs; Dan Cross; Phil Outram; Martin Langshawbr; Jon Mattock

The Perfect Disaster were an English alternative rock band from Bedfordshire/Hertfordshire, England, formed in 1980. They released four albums before splitting up in 1991. The only constant member was singer/guitarist Phil Parfitt.

== History ==
The first incarnation of the band was named Orange Disaster, with Parfitt joined by Ken Renny (bass), and Alison Pate (guitar). This line-up released a seven-inch EP called "Something's Got to Give" on Neuter Records, Catalogue Number OD 01. Often mislabeled as 1982 - the release date that is given on the labels is 1.9.1980 (1 September 1980). After this they changed their name to The Architects of Disaster. Parfitt and Pate were then joined by Tony Pettitt (bass), Nod Wright (drums) and Paul Wright (guitar). This line-up disbanded, having released one single, "Cucumber Sandwich"/"Friendly Fire." Nod Wright and Tony Pettit then left to form Fields of the Nephilim, with Parfitt recruiting Grant Davidson (bass) and later John Saltwell (bass), Dan Cross (guitar), and Malcolm Catto (drums). They returned in 1984 as The Perfect Disaster, with an eponymous debut album issued on the French Kampa label in 1985. In 1987, the band signed to Glass Records, which reissued their debut album, and followed it with a twelve-inch EP later that year. There were further line-up changes when Saltwell and Pate departed, replaced by multi-instrumentalist Josephine Wiggs. The band moved on to Fire Records, releasing the Asylum Road album in 1988. Catto also left, with Phil Outram and Martin Langshaw joining for their third album, Up, which reached number fifteen on the UK Indie Chart, and saw the band touring with The Jesus and Mary Chain. In 1989, Wiggs left to join The Breeders, with Saltwell returning. In 1990, the band issued the Rise EP, and a final album, Heaven Scent, before splitting up the following year.

Parfitt went on to work with Spiritualized's Jason Pierce, and later formed a new band, Oedipussy, who released the album, Divan, in 1995, with contributions from former House of Love and Levitation guitarist Terry Bickers. In 2014, as Philip Parfitt, he released a solo album entitled I'm Not the Man I Use to Be on Milltone Head Recordings.

== Discography ==
=== Albums ===
==== The Perfect Disaster (1985) Kampa (France); reissued (1987) Glass ====
Track Listing (French version)
Side One

1. "What Could I Do/Given The Opportunity/" - (Philip Parfitt, Danny Cross, Allison Pate, John Saltwell, Malcolm Catto) -3:21
2. "Dawn In The Dark Woods" - (Parfitt) - 3:07
3. "What's Happening To Me" - (Parfitt, Cross, Pate, Saltwell, Catto) - 3:04
4. "Hiding From Frank" - (Parfitt) - 2:20
5. "In The Pink" - (Parfitt, Cross, Pate, Saltwell, Catto) - 4:35

Side Two

6. "New Beginning" - (Parfitt, Pate) - 3:39
7. "Teddy Edward" - (Parfitt, Pate) - 2:51
8. "Keep Loves Feet On The Ground" - (Parfitt) - 2:40
9. "Memories" - (Parfitt, Pate) - 3:28
10. "Stetson" - (Philip) - 3:22

Track Listing (Reissue)
Side One

1. "What's Happening To Me?" - (Philip Parfitt, Danny Cross, Allison Pate, John Saltwell, Malcolm Catto) - 3:04
2. "Dark Woods" - (Parfitt) - 3:07
3. "What Could I Do?" - (Parfitt, Cross, Pate, Saltwell, Catto) - 3:21
4. "Hiding From Frank" - (Parfitt) - 2:20
5. "In The Pink" - (Parfitt, Cross, Pate, Saltwell, Catto) - 4:35

Side Two

6. "New Beginning" - (Parfitt, Pate) - 3:39
7. "Teddy Edward" - (Parfitt, Pate) - 2:51
8. "Keep Loves Feet On The Ground" - (Parfitt) - 2:40
9. "Memories" - (Parfitt, Pate) - 3:28
10. "Stetson" - (Philip) - 3:22
11. "Over You" - (Lou Reed) - 3:00

Personnel

- Philip Parfitt - lead vocals, saxophone
- Danny Cross - lead guitar, pixiphone
- Alison Pate - rhythm guitar, backing vocals
- John Saltwell - bass, backing vocals
- Malcolm Catto - drums, organ

==== Asylum Road (1988) Fire ====
Track Listing
Side One

1. "The Crack Up"
2. "Stop Crying Girl"
3. "All the Stars"
4. "Call It a Day"
5. "In Conference Again"
6. "Mooncraters"

Side Two

7. "T.V. (Girl on Fire)"
8. "In the Afternoon"
9. "Evil Eye"
10. "What's the Use of Trying?"
11. "The Night Belongs to Charlie"

Personnel

- Phil Parfitt - guitar, vocals
- Alison Pate - guitar, vocals
- Dan Cross - guitar
- Josephine Wiggs - bass, cello
- Martin Langshaw - percussion

==== Up (1989) Fire ====
Track Listing
Side One

1. "'55" - (words: Phil Parfitt; music: Parfitt, Dan Cross)
2. "Shout" - (words: Parfitt; music: Parfitt, Cross)
3. "It Doesn't Matter" - (words: Parfitt; music: Parfitt, Cross)
4. "Down (Here I Go)" - (words: Parfitt; music: Parfitt, Cross)
5. "Down (Falling)" - (words: Parfitt; music: Parfitt, Cross)
6. "Down (Down)" - (words: Parfitt; music: Parfitt, Cross)

Side Two

7. "Hey Now" - (words: Parfitt; music: Parfitt, Cross, Josephine Wiggs)
8. "Go Away" - (words: Parfitt; music: Parfitt, Cross)
9. "B52" - (words: Parfitt; music: Parfitt, Cross)

Bonus tracks

10. "Garage" - (words: Parfitt; music: Parfitt, Cross)
11. "Time to Kill" - (words: Parfitt; music: Parfitt, Cross)

Personnel

- Phil Parfitt - lead vocals, rhythm acoustic and electric guitars
- Dan Cross - lead electric, acoustic and Spanish guitars, organ, piano
- Josephine Wiggs - bass, backing vocals, piano, cello, double bass
- Martin Langshaw - drums (1, 7, 11)
- Phil "Jak" Outram - drums (2, 6, 8, 9)

==== Heaven Scent (1990) Fire ====
Track Listing

1. "Rise" - (words: Phil Parfitt; music: Parfitt, Dan Cross) - 2:58
2. "Father" - (words: Parfitt; music: Parfitt, Cross) - 4:05
3. "Wires" - (words: Josephine Wiggs; music: Parfitt, Cross, Wiggs) - 4:54
4. "Takin' Over" - (words: Parfitt; music: Parfitt, Cross) - 3:26
5. "Where Will You Go With Me" - (words: Parfitt; music: Parfitt, Cross) - 2:52
6. "Little Sister (If Ever Days)" - (words: Parfitt; music: Parfitt, Cross) - 5:18
7. "Shadows" - (words: Parfitt; music: Parfitt, Cross) - 5:22
8. "Sooner or Later" - (words: Parfitt; music: Parfitt, Cross) - 2:42
9. "It's Gonna Come to You" - (words: Parfitt; music: Parfitt, Cross) - 4:36

Bonus Tracks

10. "Lee" - (words: Parfitt; music: Parfitt, Cross) - 3:52
11. "Mood Elevators (Original Version)" - (words: Parfitt; music: Parfitt, Cross) - 3:38
12. "Bluebell (Live)" - (words: Parfitt; music: Parfitt, Cross) - 4:08
13. "B52 (Live)" - (words: Parfitt; music: Parfitt, Cross) - 13:15

Personnel

- Phil Parfitt - lead and backing vocals, rhythm, lead and acoustic guitars
- Dan Cross - lead, rhythm and infinite guitars, backing vocals, organ
- Josephine Wiggs - bass, backing vocals, cello
- Jon Mattock - drums (1–10), percussion (1–10)
- Phil Outram - drums (11–13)

=== Singles and EPs ===
- "Something's Got to Give" (1980) Neuter (as Orange Disaster) three songs
- "Something's Got to Give" (1981) Vogue (as Orange Disaster) two songs
- "Cucumber Sandwich" (1982) Neuter (as Architects of Disaster)
- Hey Hey Hey EP (1987) Glass
- "TV (Girl on Fire)" (1988) Fire
- "Time to Kill" (1988) Fire
- "Mood Elevators" (1989) Fire
- Rise EP (1990) Fire
