= Dusty Trails =

American music duo

- Genres: Alternative rock, indie rock
- Years active: 2000
- Past members: Vivian Trimble; Josephine Wiggs

Dusty Trails was an American music duo consisting of Vivian Trimble (formerly of Kostars and Luscious Jackson) and Josephine Wiggs (formerly of the Breeders). Trimble provided vocals and Wiggs sang harmony vocals. Their 2000 debut album, Dusty Trails, has been described as mood music and is heavy on keyboards, percussion and bass. It has also been compared to 1960s French and Brazilian pop. Half of the album's songs are instrumental and the other half feature Trimble on lead vocals. The album also includes guest vocals from Emmylou Harris on the track "Order Coffee". Three more songs are also available on the Happy Accidents (2000) film soundtrack.

== Discography ==
- Dusty Trails (2000)
- Happy Accidents soundtrack (2000)
