= Josephine Wiggs =

British musician

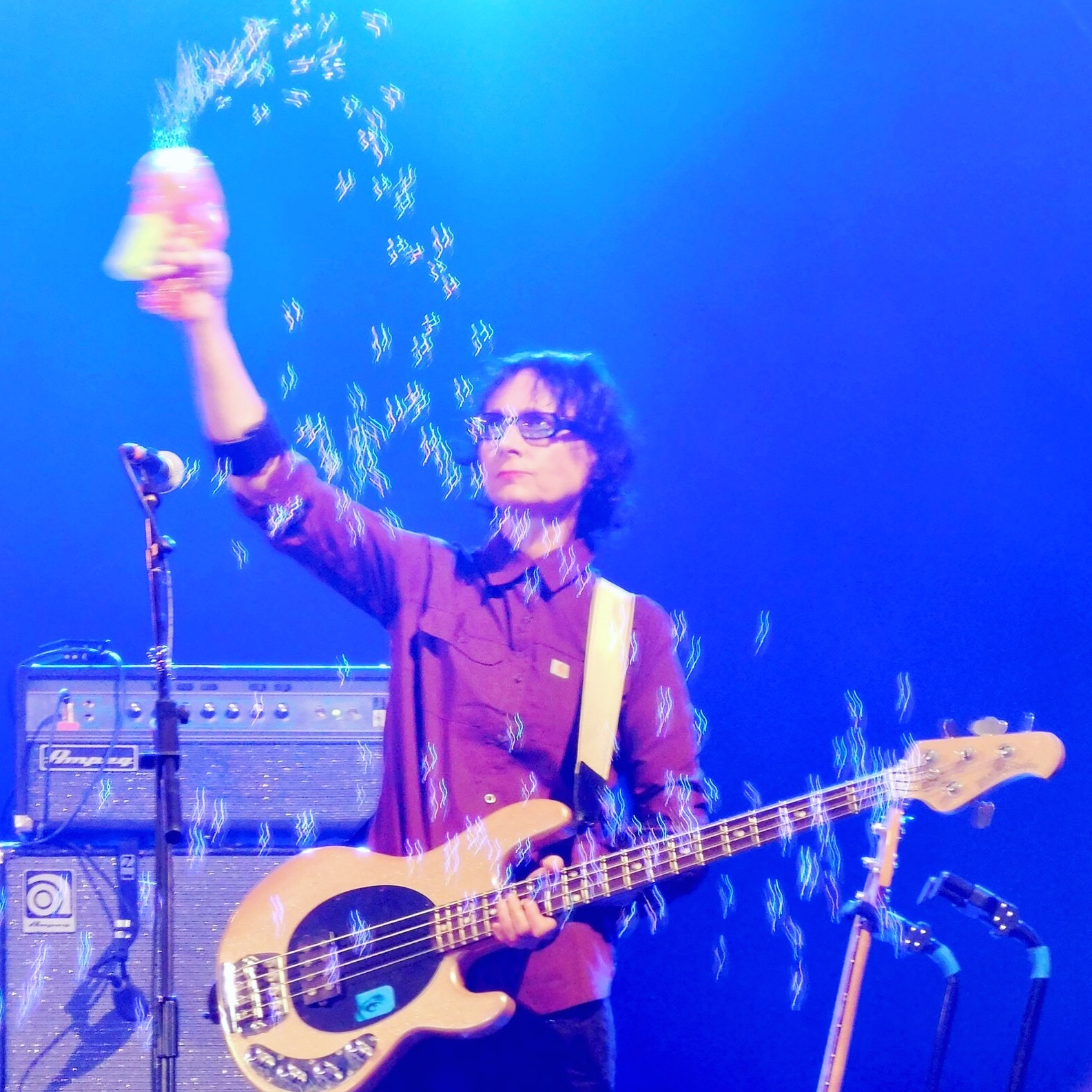
- Wiggs playing live with the Breeders in 2018

Background information
- Born: Miranda Cordelia Susan Josephine Wiggs; 26 February 1965 (age 61); Letchworth, Hertfordshire, England
- Genres: Alternative rock; indie rock
- Occupation: Musician
- Instruments: Bass; guitar; cello; piano; drums; vocals
- Years active: 1988–present
- Labels: 4AD; Fire; Grand Royal; Atlantic
- Member of: The Breeders
- Formerly of: The Perfect Disaster, Honey Tongue, The Josephine Wiggs Experience, Ladies Who Lunch, Dusty Trails

Miranda Cordelia Susan Josephine Wiggs (born 26 February 1965), simply known as Josephine Wiggs, is an English multi-instrumentalist rock musician, best known for her work as bassist in the alternative rock bands The Breeders and The Perfect Disaster. She has also formed multiple side-projects, including her own bands Honey Tongue, The Josephine Wiggs Experience, and Dusty Trails.

== Early career ==
Wiggs was born in Letchworth, Hertfordshire.

Wiggs is the daughter of Richard Wiggs, a teacher of disabled children and founder of the Anti-Concorde Project. Wiggs studied philosophy at the University of London, earning a BA degree, going on to get an MA in continental philosophy from the University of Sussex. She studied cello for ten years. She joined The Perfect Disaster in 1988 as bass guitarist, playing on the albums Asylum Road, (1988) Up (1989) and Heaven Scent (1990) before going on to form The Breeders with Kim Deal and Tanya Donelly in 1990. Wiggs played cello on the Spacemen 3 album Playing with Fire.

== Career with The Breeders ==
In 1988, Wiggs met Kim Deal when The Perfect Disaster supported the Pixies in London. In 1989, Deal asked Wiggs to join her and Tanya Donelly (of Throwing Muses) in making The Breeders' first album Pod. Deal, Wiggs and Slint drummer Britt Walford rehearsed for a week at Wiggs's house in Bedfordshire, and for a further week with Donelly in London, before driving to Edinburgh to record the album with engineer Steve Albini. The album was released in 1990 on record label 4AD. In 1992, Deal visited Wiggs in Brighton during her time off from the Pixies, and they worked on the song "Safari", recording it in London with Wiggs's friend Spacemen 3/Spiritualized drummer Jon Mattock. This recording became the title track of The Breeders' second release, the Safari EP.

From 1992, alongside Deal and Wiggs, The Breeders' second incarnation had Kim's twin sister Kelley Deal on lead guitar and Jim Macpherson on drums. This line-up recorded the album Last Splash in 1993, which featured the hit song "Cannonball", which opens with Wiggs' highly-recognisable bass riff. The video for "Cannonball", much-played on MTV, was directed by Kim Gordon and Spike Jonze. The Breeders supported Nirvana on their In Utero tour, and Last Splash achieved platinum sales.

Wiggs' last record with the band (before rejoining in 2013) was the EP, Head to Toe whose title track was written by Wiggs. After playing the 1994 Lollapolooza Tour, The Breeders went on indefinite hiatus following the well-publicized drug problems of guitarist Kelley Deal. Kim Deal released a solo album, the Amps, Pacer in 1995, and she resurrected the Breeders' name in the late 1990s, but neither Wiggs nor Macpherson were members of this line-up. In November 2005, Wiggs played two shows with The Breeders in London, at an event commemorating the 25th anniversary of record label 4AD.

On 21 August 2009, with one day's notice and no rehearsal, Wiggs played three shows with The Breeders after then-bassist Mando Lopez had to fly home because his girlfriend had gone into labor. These shows were at the Black Cat in Washington, D.C., Diesel in Pittsburgh, and at Newport Music Hall in Columbus, Ohio. In 2013, Wiggs had officially re-joined The Breeders for the bands' Last Splash 20th Anniversary World Tour, to coincide with 4AD's release of LSXX, a limited-edition seven-disc vinyl box set, and three-CD package of the band's 1993 hit album Last Splash. Since then, Wiggs and Jim Macpherson have returned to The Breeders full-time for the tour and release of the 2018 album All Nerve, the band's fifth album overall, and the first album to reunite the Last Splash line-up (Kim, Kelley, Josephine, and Jim) since 1993.

== Other work ==
In 1992, Wiggs had collaborated with Jon Mattock and released an album, Nude Nudes, under the name Honey Tongue. In 1995, Wiggs and Luscious Jackson (and original Beastie Boys) drummer Kate Schellenbach formed Ladies Who Lunch, releasing the 7-inch vinyl Kims We Love (an homage to Kim Deal and Sonic Youth's Kim Gordon, played entirely on Casio keyboards) on the Beastie Boys' label, Grand Royal. This was followed by the 7-inch vinyl cover of the Buzzcocks song "Everybody's Happy Nowadays".

In 1995, Wiggs recorded and co-produced the album Klassics with a K for the Kostars, featuring Luscious Jackson's Jill Cunniff and Vivian Trimble, and toured with them playing drums. In 1996, Wiggs collaborated again with Jon Mattock releasing Bon Bon Lifestyle on Grand Royal as The Josephine Wiggs Experience. Wiggs sang vocals, played guitar and electric and acoustic bass, and recorded and mixed the album. Jon Mattock played drums, other percussion, and keyboards. Audu Obaje played guitar and helped Josephine record and mix the album.

In 1997, Wiggs started a writing and recording collaboration with Luscious Jackson keyboardist Vivian Trimble under the name Dusty Trails. Their eponymous 2000 album on Atlantic Records included a track written for, and sung by, Emmylou Harris. They also wrote music for Happy Accidents, a movie by Brad Anderson starring Marisa Tomei and Vincent D'Onofrio. In addition, they collaborated with internationally acclaimed New York-based Brazilian choreographers chameckilerner, writing and recording full-length scores for Poor Reality (2001) and Exit (2007). They also provided the soundtrack for chameckilerner's short film Flying Lesson, (which premiered at Lincoln Center, 2008) and for their short film The Collection (2011).

In 2009, Wiggs recorded the soundtrack for chameckilerner's Conversation with Boxing Gloves, one of eleven short films that make up Vita Futurista Redux, a re-imagining of the lost 1916 film Vita Futurista, commissioned by Performa 09 and which premiered at SFMOMA. In 2012, she wrote and recorded a piano-based score for the documentary Built on Narrow Land, a film about Bauhaus-inspired modern houses in Wellfleet, Cape Cod, which premiered at Provincetown International Film Festival and was included in the Architecture and Design Film Festival, New York City, 2013. In 2013, she wrote and recorded the score for the first feature film by writer-director Desiree Akhavan, Appropriate Behavior, which premiered at the Sundance Film Festival, in 2014.

Her first solo album "We Fall" was released on 17 May 2019. All tracks were composed, performed and recorded by Wiggs, with additional drums/electronics by her former Honey Tongue bandmate Jon Mattock. She released the music video for the album's first single "Time Does Not Bring Relief" on 20 March 2019.

== Personal life ==
According to a 1994 Rolling Stone profile of The Breeders, Wiggs is a lifelong vegan who has never eaten a piece of meat in her life.

Wiggs is a lesbian. During a relationship with drummer Kate Schellenbach, the two were featured in an article in The Advocate, a national LGBT magazine published in the United States. They formed the short-lived band Ladies Who Lunch, and Wiggs recorded and co-produced Schellenbach's side-project Kostars.

== Discography ==
=== The Perfect Disaster ===
- Asylum Road (1988 album), Fire Records
- Up (1989 album), Fire Records
- Heaven Scent (1990 album), Fire Records

=== The Breeders ===
- Pod (1990 album), 4AD
- Safari (1992 EP), 4AD
- Last Splash (1993 album), 4AD
- Head to Toe (1994 EP), 4AD
- All Nerve (2018 album), 4AD

=== Honey Tongue ===
- Nude Nudes (1992 album), Playtime Records

=== Ladies Who Lunch ===
- Kim's We Love (1995 7" vinyl), Grand Royal
- Everybody's Happy Nowadays (1996 7" vinyl), Grand Royal

=== Dusty Trails ===
- Dusty Trails (2000 album), Atlantic Records

=== Solo ===
- Bon Bon Lifestyle (1996 album), Grand Royal (as The Josephine Wiggs Experience)
- We Fall (2019 album), Sound of Sinners
