= Jon Mattock =

English drummer

Jonny Mattock is an English drummer and percussionist from Northampton, England, who was a member of, or played with, Massive Attack, Spacemen 3, Spiritualized, The Perfect Disaster, Slipstream, Lupine Howl, Cranes, Baxter Dury, The Breeders, The Jazz Butcher, Honey Tongue, Josephine Wiggs Experience, Freelovebabies. He now teaches music at his local college.
