= Ladyfingers (song) =

1999 single by Luscious Jackson

Single by Luscious Jackson

from the album Electric Honey
- Released: June 14, 1999
- Genre: Alternative rock
- Length: 3:27
- Label: Grand Royal
- Songwriter: Jill Cunniff
- Producers: Jill Cunniff; Tony Mangurian

Luscious Jackson singles chronology
"Let It Snow" (1998)	"Ladyfingers" (1999)	"Nervous Breakthrough" (1999)

Music video
- "Ladyfingers" on YouTube

"Ladyfingers" is a song performed by American alternative rock group Luscious Jackson, issued as the lead single from their third studio album Electric Honey. Written and co-produced by lead singer Jill Cunniff, the song peaked at #28 on the Billboard Alternative chart in 1999.

== Music video ==
The official music video for "Ladyfingers" was directed by Tamra Davis. Cibo Matto appear in the video.

== Chart positions ==
Chart (1999)	Peak position
New Zealand Singles Chart (RIANZ)	27
UK Singles (OCC)	43
US Alternative Airplay (Billboard)	28
