= City Beach (album) =

Studio album by Jill Cunniff
- Released: February 20, 2007
- Genre: Electronic; hip-hop; rock
- Length: 42:40
- Label: The Militia Group

Professional ratings
Aggregate scores
Source	Rating
Metacritic	52/100
Review scores
Source	Rating
Allmusic	4/5 stars
Now	2/5 stars
PopMatters	2/10
Rolling Stone	2.5/5 stars
Slant Magazine	3/5 stars

City Beach is the title of the solo album released by Luscious Jackson member Jill Cunniff. It was released on February 20, 2007 on CD. It was also released on 12" vinyl, which also includes an exclusive track co-written by author, journalist, musician and cult heroine Vivian Goldman, "Like Smoke" not available on the CD or by web download. 500 copies of City Beach were made available on red and yellow vinyl.

The following is the Official Press Release taken from JillCunniff.com:

Jill Cunniff, ex-singer of the alternative rock, all-girl group Luscious Jackson, explained her debut solo album as a “mood record made to bring the beach to caged up city dwellers. I hope it will also bring the city to homesick urbanites everywhere.” The twelve-track album is a breezy, earnest yet celebratory piece—aglow with motherly wisdom and metrical nods to the unassailable grit and color of urban life.

Emmylou Harris appears as a guest vocalist on the album.

== Critical reception ==
City Beach was met with "mixed or average" reviews from critics. At Metacritic, which assigns a weighted average rating out of 100 to reviews from mainstream publications, this release received an average score of 52 based on 13 reviews.

In a review for AllMusic, Stephen Thomas Erlewine said: "City Beach never hits hard, never seems forced, but even if this is deliberately lazy music, that doesn't mean that it lacks hooks or structure: if anything, the best songs here are more immediate than Luscious Jackson, evidence that Cunniff's skills as a writer are sharpening. But the best thing about City Beach is how Cunniff easily sucks you into her particular worldview." Christian Hoard of Rolling Stone explained: "Her [Cunniff] solo debut offers something a little different: breezy indie pop underpinned with electronic beats that are usually lush and sometimes expansive. Much of City Beach is sort of bland and a little corny."

== Track listing ==
City Beach track listing
No.	Title	Writer(s)	Length
1.	"Lazy Girls"	Jill Cunniff	2:49
2.	"Happy Warriors"	Cunniff	3:11
3.	"NYC Boy"	Cunniff	3:31
4.	"Warm Sound"	Cunniff	3:17
5.	"Eye Candy"	Cunniff	2:49
6.	"Apartment 3"	Cunniff; Dave Schoomer	4:01
7.	"Love is a Luxury"	Cunniff	3:40
8.	"Exclusive"	Cunniff	4:10
9.	"Kaleidoscope"	Cunniff; Rachael Yamagata	4:15
10.	"Future Call"	Cunniff; Schoomer	3:26
11.	"Calling Me"	Cunniff	3:55
12.	"Disconnection" (12" vinyl only bonus track)	Cunniff	3:36
13.	"Like Smoke"

Vinyl edition
No.	Title	Length
13.	"Kaleidoscope" (Fader Creeps Version)
14.	"Ladyfingers" (Fader Creeps Version)

iTunes Deluxe version
No.	Title	Length
12.	"Disconnection" (featuring Emmylou Harris)	3:36
13.	"Last Summer" (Sparkle mix)	4:52
14.	"Blue Nile" (featuring Nile Rodgers)	4:50
15.	"Daisychains"	3:37
16.	"Ladyfingers" (Fader Creeps version)	2:55
17.	"E Is For Everybody"	5:32
