= Luscious Jackson =

American alternative rock band

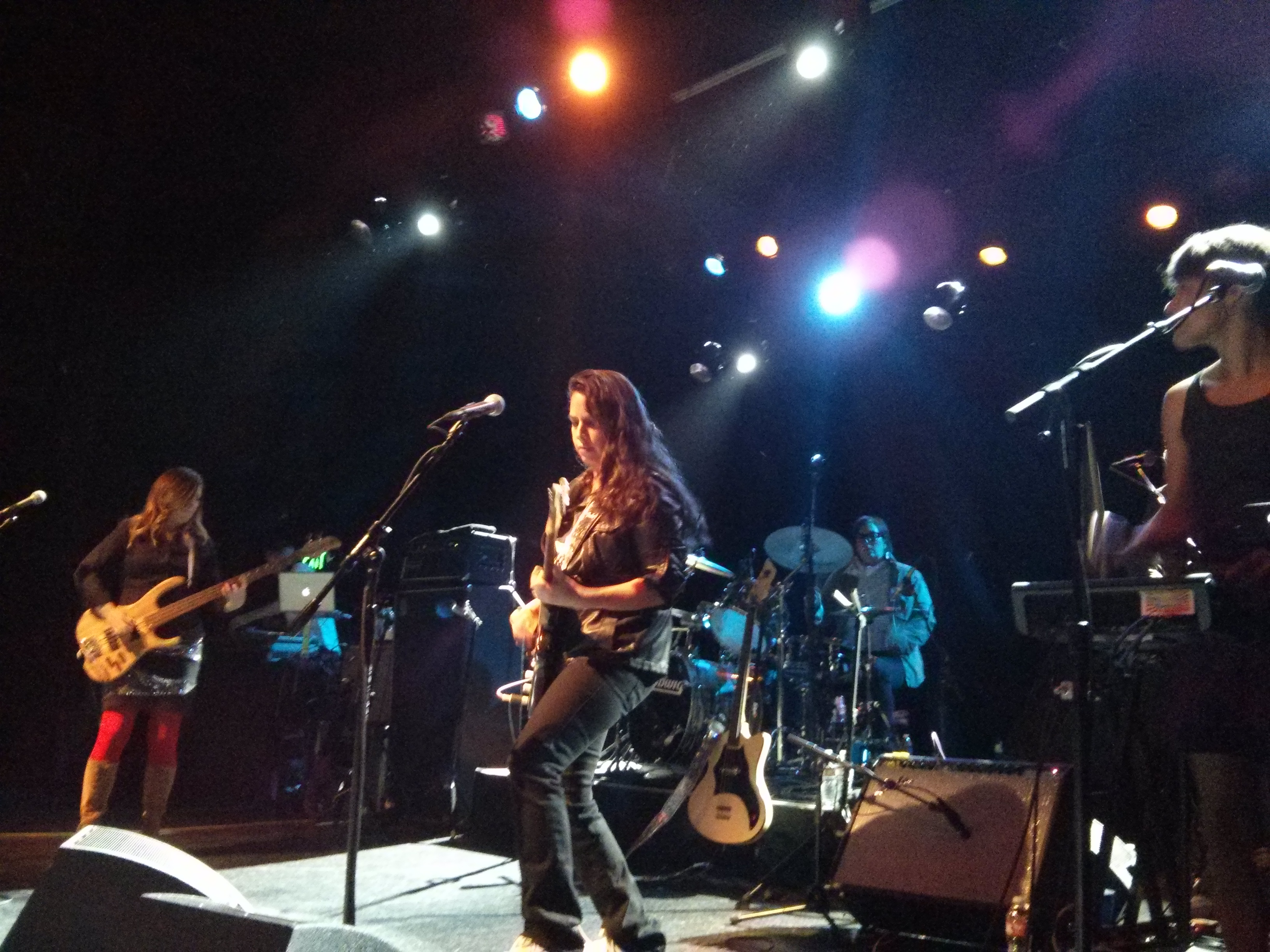
- Luscious Jackson in 2014

Background information
- Origin: Manhattan, New York, U.S.
- Genres: Alternative rock; alternative hip hop; rap rock; trip hop
- Years active: 1991–2000, 2011–2017
- Labels: Grand Royal, Capitol
- Members: Jill Cunniff; Gabby Glaser; Kate Schellenbach
- Past members: Vivian Trimble
- Website: lusciousjackson.us

Luscious Jackson is an alternative rock/rap-rock group formed in 1991. The band's name is a reference to former American basketball player Lucious Jackson.

The original band consisted of Jill Cunniff (lead vocals, bass), Gabby Glaser (vocals, guitar), and Vivian Trimble (keyboards, vocals). Drummer Kate Schellenbach joined the band midway through the recording of their 1992 debut EP In Search of Manny.

Between 1993 and 2000, the band released one EP, three full-length LPs, and ten singles on the Beastie Boys' Grand Royal label. Their biggest hit — and only Billboard Hot 100 entry — was "Naked Eye". Other singles include "Here", "Daughters of the Kaos", "Citysong", "Under Your Skin" and "Ladyfingers".

Keyboardist Vivian Trimble left the group in 1998, and in 2000 the group announced their breakup, after releasing one album as a trio. February 2007 saw the release of the group's Greatest Hits.

In 2011, the three remaining members announced that they had reunited and were planning to make new music. The band released two new albums, including a children's album, in November 2013.

== History ==
=== 1991–1993 ===
In 1991, Jill Cunniff and Gabby Glaser (the niece of graphic designer Milton Glaser) created the first Luscious Jackson demo with tip money from their restaurant jobs. The band's name was derived from a malapropism of the name of former American basketball player Lucious Jackson, after the band members heard an announcer on ESPN's SportsCenter mispronounce Jackson's first name as "Luscious" and thought it would make for a great band name. Their first live performance was opening for Beastie Boys and Cypress Hill at the now-defunct Building in lower New York City. The Beastie Boys asked Luscious Jackson to be the first band on their Grand Royal label.

Former Beastie Boys band member Kate Schellenbach soon joined Luscious Jackson on drums, while Vivian Trimble took keyboard and backing vocal duties.

Three tracks from the original Luscious Jackson demo, along with four new songs, were released in 1992 as the In Search of Manny EP. "Let Yourself Get Down" and "Daughters of the Kaos" were issued as promotional singles, while a video was also filmed for the latter.

=== 1994–1995 ===
After previewing two new recordings from their forthcoming album on the promotional Daughters of the Kaos EP, Luscious Jackson released their first full-length LP for the Grand Royal label, Natural Ingredients (1994). The album spawned three minor hits with "Citysong", "Deep Shag" and "Here", the latter featured in the film Clueless (1995). In addition, all three singles had music videos which received airplay on MTV.

The years 1994 and 1995 brought continued success for the band. They took part in the Lollapalooza tour and were the musical guest on numerous television shows, including Saturday Night Live, Viva Variety and MTV's 120 Minutes. They were also featured in a fashion segment on MTV's House of Style and on the Nickelodeon series The Adventures of Pete and Pete in the episode titled "Dance Fever", where the band performed "Angel", "Satellite", "Pele Merengue" and "Here" at Little Pete's first junior high dance.

While on tour in 1995, Trimble and Cunniff recorded a collection of mellow, acoustic-driven songs under the name Kostars, titled Klassics with a "K". The album was released in 1996 and featured contributions by Schellenbach and Glaser, as well as Gene and Dean Ween of Ween, and was produced by Josephine Wiggs, bass player of the Breeders.

=== 1996–1997 ===
The time between 1996 and 1997 was Luscious Jackson's most commercially successful period. While promoting the release of their second full-length album, 1996's Fever In Fever Out (produced by Daniel Lanois), they scored their first Billboard Top 40 hit with "Naked Eye". Two follow-up singles were released: "Under Your Skin" and "Why Do I Lie?", the latter of which was featured in the Gus Van Sant film Good Will Hunting (1997).

During this time, Luscious Jackson's "Nice Duds" fan club members received a 10-track CD album of demos and live rarities titled Tip Top Starlets.

=== 1998–2000 ===
In 1998, Luscious Jackson recorded George Gershwin's "I've Got a Crush on You" for the Red Hot Organization's compilation album Red Hot + Rhapsody, a tribute to Gershwin which raised money for various charities devoted to increasing AIDS awareness and fighting the disease. Luscious Jackson were featured in an ad campaign for the Gap throughout 1998 and 1999. Their Christmas ad "Let It Snow! Let It Snow! Let It Snow!" was voted the most popular of the campaign in TV Guide.

In April of that year, Trimble left Luscious Jackson to pursue other interests, stating that she had grown tired of touring and wanted to ground herself in New York City. Two years later, Trimble and Josephine Wiggs released a self-titled album under the name Dusty Trails.

In 1999, Luscious Jackson (recording as a trio) released their third full-length LP, Electric Honey. The single "Ladyfingers" was a moderate success, with the video put into heavy rotation on VH1. "Ladyfingers" was also featured in the Buffy the Vampire Slayer TV series episode "Beer Bad", as well as the "Witch Trial" episode of Charmed. A second single, "Nervous Breakthrough", was issued without a music video or commercial single release. Plans for releasing "Devotion" as the third single from Electric Honey were scrapped as interest in the album waned, although a radio/single remix was prepared.

The band embarked upon a tour that year with Cibo Matto, and both bands had performed at that year's Lilith Fair. Trimble was replaced by Singh Birdsong on keyboards, and the touring group was joined by DJ Alex Young and bassist/percussionist Tia Sprocket. In August, the tour included a date at the Opera House in Toronto.

In 2000, Luscious Jackson announced they would no longer be recording or touring, as they wanted to spend more time with their families.

=== Greatest hits and solo albums ===
In February 2007, Capitol Records released a Greatest Hits album.

On February 20, 2007, Cunniff released her first solo album, City Beach, on the Militia Group label.

On June 26, 2007, Glaser released her debut solo album, Gimme Splash, via Latchkey Recordings.

=== Reunion (2011–present) ===
In 2006, Luscious Jackson announced plans to reunite to record a new album of songs for children. By September of that year, the band had completed eleven tracks for the album and was seeking a label to release it. It was untitled, although Cunniff told MTV she wanted to call it It's All Goo.

On July 8, Luscious Jackson's official Twitter and Facebook accounts became active and confirmed that the band had reunited. Cunniff, Glaser and Schellenbach all returned to the band, while Trimble did not. Working with Pledgemusic as part of a fundraising drive, the band hoped to finish their album for children that had first been planned in 2006. They also revealed plans to make a new studio album, their first since 1999. A previously unreleased track from 1999 called "Girlscout" was also made available by the band as a free download.

On February 8, 2012, Rolling Stone magazine posted an article on how the band had reunited quietly in 2011 after more than a decade apart to begin work on their first album of new material since Electric Honey. The band opted to skip signing to a traditional label in favor of funding their new project through Pledgemusic. A track titled "Are You Ready?" was made available via internet stream. In September 2013, the lead single from their forthcoming album Magic Hour, "So Rock On", was premiered on NPR's All Songs Considered program.

The trio released Magic Hour on November 5, 2013, followed by their children's album, Baby DJ, on November 12. The band performed two shows in support of Magic Hour in Philadelphia on November 23 and New York on December 7, followed by an appearance on Late Show with David Letterman on November 18. Sporadic performances followed in 2014 and 2016.

On April 6, 2023, it was reported that former keyboard player Vivian Trimble had died two days prior, on April 4, at the age of 59, due to cancer.

== Members ==
- Jill Cunniff – vocals, bass (1991–2000, 2006, 2012–present)
- Gabby Glaser – vocals, guitars (1991–2000, 2006, 2012–present)
- Kate Schellenbach – drums (1992–2000, 2006, 2012–present)

=== Former members ===
- Vivian Trimble – keyboards, vocals (1992–2000, 2006, 2012–2023; her death)

== Discography ==
- In Search of Manny (1992) (Note: Released as a mini-album.)
- Natural Ingredients (1994)
- Fever In Fever Out (1996)
- Electric Honey (1999)
- Magic Hour (2013)
- Baby DJ (2013) (Note: Released as a children's album.)

== Side and solo projects ==
Band members have been involved in the following side and solo projects:

- Kims We Love 7” by Ladies Who Lunch (1995)
- Klassics with a "K" by Kostars (1996)
- Everybody’s Happy Nowadays 7” by Ladies Who Lunch (1997)
- Dusty Trails by Dusty Trails (2000)
- Punk Debutante by Cooler Kids (2003)
- City Beach by Jill Cunniff (2007)
- Gimme Splash by Gabby Glaser (2007)

== See also ==
- List of all-female bands
