= Vivian Trimble =

American musician (1963–2023)

Vivian Elizabeth Trimble (May 24, 1963 – April 4, 2023) was an American musician, best known as the keyboardist in the band Luscious Jackson from 1991 to 1998. She also joined bandmate Jill Cunniff under the name Kostars and recorded an album released in 1996. After leaving Luscious Jackson in April 1998, Trimble formed a duo with Josephine Wiggs named Dusty Trails, releasing an album in 2000.

== Personal life ==
Born in New York City to a concert pianist mother and a singer father, she was raised in the United States and France. She attended Oberlin College before moving to New York where she taught GED classes.

After her music career ended, she lived privately with her family in Contoocook, New Hampshire, and worked as a booker at the Capitol Center for the Arts in Concord.

On April 6, 2023, the band's official Facebook page announced she had died on April 4, from complications of a several years-long battle with cancer. She was 59 years old. She was survived by her husband, David Lewine, and two children, Nate and Rebecca.
