= Kate Schellenbach =

American musician (born 1966)

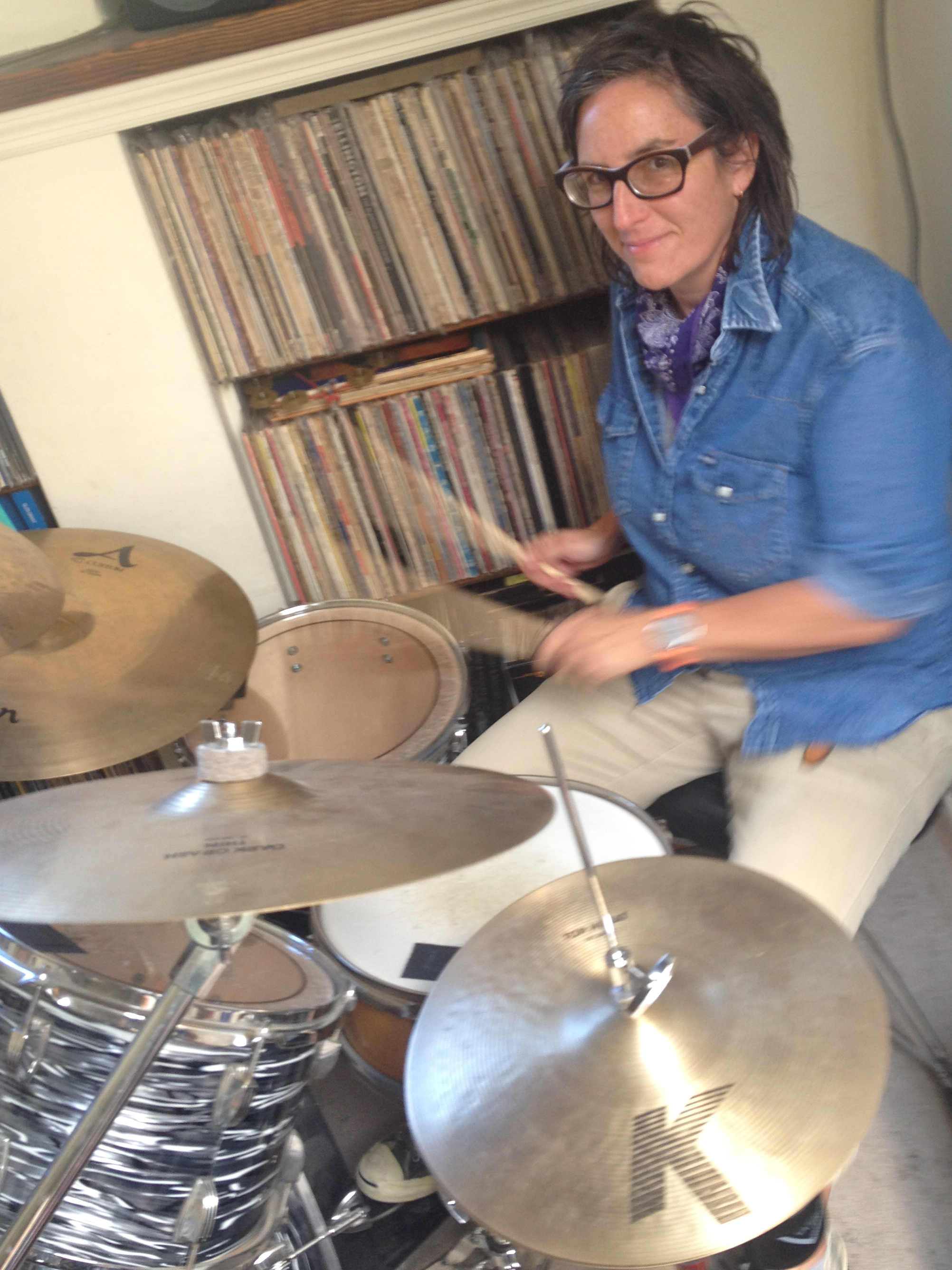
- Schellenbach in 2012

Background information
- Born: January 5, 1966 (age 60); New York City, U.S.
- Genres: Punk rock; alternative rock; alternative hip hop; indie rock
- Occupations: Drummer, Producer for Exactly Right Podcast Network
- Instruments: Drums; vocals
- Years active: 1981–present
- Member of: Luscious Jackson
- Formerly of: Beastie Boys; Lunachicks; Ladies Who Lunch

Katherine A. Schellenbach (born January 5, 1966) is an American musician and television producer. She is the drummer of Luscious Jackson and was a founding drummer of Beastie Boys.

== Career ==
Born in New York City, she played with Beastie Boys from 1981 to 1984, when she was fired from the band because she did not fit into their new dynamic as they transitioned from punk music to hip-hop. In their 2018 memoir, Ad-Rock expressed regret for firing Schellenbach, which he attributed to her not fitting with the "new tough-rapper-guy identity". Schellenbach then drummed for Luscious Jackson, which the Beastie Boys signed to their newly-formed Grand Royal label. She remained with Luscious Jackson until the band broke up in early 2000, and played with them again when they re-formed in 2011.

Schellenbach was also the drummer for the punk band the Lunachicks, during early 1993 for a very short period of time, before Chip English was recruited.

She was later an Emmy Award-winning segment producer on The Ellen DeGeneres Show appearing on screen on a show first aired on December 4, 2007, playing the bongos with host Ellen DeGeneres. She has also worked as a producer on Lopez Tonight; Kathy; Love You, Mean It with Whitney Cummings; Chelsea Lately; Hello Ross; and The Late Late Show with James Corden.

== Personal life ==
Schellenbach attended New York City's math and science high school, Stuyvesant High School. She graduated with a BA in Studio Art from Hunter College.

She was romantically linked to the Breeders bassist Josephine Wiggs. During their relationship, they were featured in an article in The Advocate, a national LGBT magazine published in the United States. They formed the short-lived band Ladies Who Lunch, and Schellenbach played drums on Luscious Jackson's side-project, Kostars, which Wiggs recorded and co-produced.
