= Jill Cunniff =

American musician

- Born: August 17, 1966 (age 60)
- Origin: New York City
- Occupations: Singer-songwriter, guitarist
- Formerly of: Luscious Jackson

Jill Cunniff (born August 17, 1966) is an American musician and artist, best known as the lead singer of the band Luscious Jackson. Cunniff was born and raised in New York City and attended Fiorello H. LaGuardia High School where she studied visual arts. She graduated from the University of California, Berkeley. After returning to New York in 1991, she formed Luscious Jackson with friend Gabby Glaser. Cunniff plays bass, sings lead vocals, and has been the chief songwriter of the band.

Cunniff joined Luscious Jackson bandmate Vivian Trimble under the name Kostars and recorded the album Klassics with a "K", released in 1996. In 2002, she formed a house music group named the Cooler Kids. Cunniff released a solo album, City Beach, in early 2007.
