= Grand Royal =

American music recording and publishing company

Grand Royal Records, LLC
- Type: Incentive
- Industry: Music production
- Genre: Alternative rock; hip hop; Shibuya-kei
- Founded: 1992; 34 years ago
- Founder: Beastie Boys
- Defunct: August 31, 2001; 25 years ago
- Fate: Bankruptcy
- Headquarters: G-Son Studios, Los Angeles, California
- Website: grandroyal.com (Archived on July 6, 2001)

Grand Royal was a vanity record label founded in 1992 by rap group Beastie Boys in conjunction with Capitol Records after the group left Def Jam Recordings. It was based in Los Angeles, California.

Grand Royal was also the name of a magazine written and published by the group. Described as a publication that "came to define part of Generation X," the total distribution of the six issues of Grand Royal was estimated at 300,000 copies.

Due to mounting debts, Grand Royal closed down on August 31, 2001, and formally declared bankruptcy in July 2002. Its assets were sold off via auction on Bid4Assets; these assets did not include any rights to Beastie Boys music. The assets and back catalog were purchased by a group of fans who in turn started GR2 Records. In 2016, GR2 sold the rights and master recordings of Grand Royal's second release My Crazy Life to a member of the band Dead Fucking Last.

In 2017, Stiletto Entertainment, the company that currently owns GR2, was sued by dance-punk band Liquid Liquid for copyright infringement, breach of contract, and not paying them royalties over the unauthorized licensing of their music and sales of the 2008 reissue of their 1997 compilation Liquid Liquid, which was originally distributed by Grand Royal.

The label was mentioned in the Beastie Boys Book. Some notable music executives gained their start at Grand Royal Records such as Ian Rogers, Kenny "Tick" Salcido, and Miwa Okumura. Mark Kates, Craig Aaronson, John Silva, Steve Rosenblatt and Gary Gersh were also established executives employed by Grand Royal Records.

The Jet Set Radio Future Sampler was the label's last official release, featuring original music by the Mike D-led production group the Latch Brothers.

== See also ==
- List of record labels
- List of Grand Royal artists
