= List of University of Wisconsin–Whitewater alumni =

The University of Wisconsin–Whitewater is a public university in Whitewater, Wisconsin, United States. Following is a list of some of its notable alumni.

== Academia and education ==
- Carol Cartwright – former president, Bowling Green State University and Kent State University
- Lily Haass – YWCA worker in Shanghai, China; educates Chinese women
- Harold D. Richardson – vice president and acting president, Arizona State University
- Rollin D. Salisbury – professor and chair of the geology department, Beloit College
- Marijuana Pepsi Vandyck – educator and program director, Beloit College

== Art (including architecture) ==
- B. Gunar Gruenke – stained-glass artist; president, Conrad Schmitt Studios
- Marc Travanti – contemporary artist

== Business ==
- John W. Scherer – founder, Video Professor
- Quint Studer – founder and chief executive officer, health-care consulting company Studer Group; co-owner, Pensacola Blue Wahoos

== Entertainment ==
- John Belushi – actor and Saturday Night Live comedian (attended)
- Susan Beschta – founder and lead singer of Erasers
- Craig Coshun – pre-game host and reporter for Milwaukee Brewers on Fox Sports Network
- Emmy Fink – broadcast television reporter
- Kenn Hoekstra – game developer and producer at Pi Studios
- Isabella Hofmann – actress (attended)
- Johnny Lechner – film and television actor
- Kay Lertsittichai – YouTube vlogger, actor
- AzMarie Livingston – fashion model and actress
- John Wheeler – singer, songwriter, record producer, and member of Hayseed Dixie

== Law ==
- Chester A. Fowler – justice of the Wisconsin Supreme Court
- Ken Kratz – lawyer, former district attorney of Calumet County, Wisconsin; law license was suspended for four months after sexting scandal

== Literature and journalism ==
- Eva Kinney Griffith – journalist, temperance activist, novelist, newspaper editor, journal publisher
- Mary Catherine Judd – author, poet, and peace activist

== Military ==
- Merton W. Baker – U.S. Air Force major general
- Grant R. Mulder – U.S. Air Force major general

== Politics ==
- Paul Alfonsi – speaker of the Wisconsin State Assembly
- Clinton Anderson – Wisconsin State Assembly
- Albert B. Barney – Wisconsin State Assembly
- Walter B. Calvert – Wisconsin State Assembly
- James R. Charneski – Wisconsin State Assembly
- Robert L. Clark – Wisconsin State Assembly
- Dave Considine – Wisconsin State Assembly
- Timothy Cullen – majority leader of the Wisconsin Senate
- Mel J. Cyrak – Wisconsin State Assembly
- Marc C. Duff – Wisconsin State Assembly
- Judy Erwin – Illinois House of Representatives
- Babatunde Fowler – chief executive officer, Lagos State Internal Revenue Service
- Frank L. Fraser – Wisconsin State Assembly
- Edward Grassman – Wisconsin State Assembly
- Tom Hebl – Wisconsin State Assembly and Wisconsin municipal judge
- Jim Holperin – Wisconsin Senate
- Cody Horlacher – Wisconsin State Assembly and Wisconsin circuit court judge
- Maxine Hough – Wisconsin State Assembly
- Rob Hutton – Wisconsin Senate
- G. Erle Ingram – Wisconsin Senate
- Arthur J. Jones – American neo-Nazi, Holocaust denier and perennial candidate
- Neal Kedzie – Wisconsin Senate
- Samantha Kerkman – Wisconsin State Assembly
- Joe Knilans – Wisconsin State Assembly
- Bill Kramer – Wisconsin State Assembly
- Mike Kuglitsch – Wisconsin State Assembly
- Jon Litscher – 4th and 9th secretary of the Wisconsin Department of Corrections
- Thomas A. Loftus – U.S. ambassador to Norway 1993–97; former speaker of Wisconsin State Assembly
- Barbara Lorman – Wisconsin Senate
- John T. Manske – Wisconsin State Assembly
- Howard Marklein – Wisconsin Senate and Wisconsin State Assembly
- Max Maxfield – Wyoming state auditor (1999–2007) and secretary of state of Wyoming (2007–2015)
- Stephen Nass – Wisconsin Senate
- Mark Neumann – United States House of Representatives
- John Plewa – Wisconsin Senate and Wisconsin State Assembly
- Lewis W. Powell – Wisconsin State Assembly and district attorney of Kenosha County, Wisconsin
- Reince Priebus – former chairman of Republican National Committee and White House chief of staff
- Randall J. Radtke – Wisconsin State Assembly
- Clifford E. Randall – United States House of Representatives
- Henry Edgar Roethe – Wisconsin State Assembly
- Joseph E. Russell – Wisconsin State Assembly
- Arthur H. Sholts – Wisconsin State Assembly
- 'James Stewart – Wisconsin State Assembly
- Charles Simeon Taylor – Wisconsin Senate and Wisconsin State Assembly
- Robin Vos – speaker of the Wisconsin State Assembly
- Don Vruwink – Wisconsin State Assembly and Wisconsin Commissioner of Railroads
- Joan Wade – Wisconsin State Assembly
- Timothy Weeden – Wisconsin Senate and Wisconsin State Assembly
- Evan Wynn – Wisconsin State Assembly
- Dwight A. York – Wisconsin State Assembly

== Religion ==
- Mila Tupper Maynard – Unitarian minister, writer, social reformer, and suffragist

== Sports ==
- Chick Agnew – football player, coach, and college sports administrator
- Corey Anderson – mixed martial arts fighter
- Lake Bachar – professional baseball player with San Diego Padres
- Justin Beaver – gridiron football player
- Bob Berezowitz – head coach for the Wisconsin–Whitewater Warhawks football
- Matt Blanchard – professional football player
- Gene Brabender – professional baseball player for Baltimore Orioles and Seattle Pilots/Milwaukee Brewers
- Vilnis Ezerins – professional football player for Los Angeles Rams
- Laura Fürst – German 2.0 point national wheelchair basketball player
- Darnell Harris – professional basketball player
- Jeff Jagodzinski – football coach for Green Bay Packers and Boston College
- Joey Johnson – professional wheelchair basketball player
- Dave Kraayeveld – professional football player
- Jake Kumerow – former NFL player
- Dick Lange – professional basketball player
- Lance Leipold – former football head coach of the University of Wisconsin–Whitewater and the University of Buffalo; current head coach at the University of Kansas
- Derrick LeVake – professional football player
- Bill Lobenstein – former professional football player for Denver Broncos
- Quinn Meinerz – professional football player for the Denver Broncos
- Max Meylor – professional football player with the Indoor Football League
- T. J. Otzelberger – college basketball coach; current head coach at Iowa State University
- Joe Panos – professional football player
- A. J. Raebel – professional football player for Minnesota Vikings and Saskatchewan Roughriders
- Jace Rindahl – head coach for the Wisconsin–Whitewater Warhawks football team
- Stuart Rindy – former football player for Chicago Bears
- Jeff Schebler – college football player
- Pete Schmitt – former professional football player for Washington Redskins
- Ed Schwager – college football and basketball coach
- Matt Scott – professional wheelchair basketball player
- Derek Stanley – former professional football player for St. Louis Rams
- Eric Studesville – assistant coach for Denver Broncos, 2010 interim head coach
- Jack Synold – head football coach at Carthage College
- Nate Trewyn – professional football player
- Matt Turk – professional football player
- Bob Wickman – professional baseball player for New York Yankees, Milwaukee Brewers, Arizona Diamondbacks

== See also ==
- List of people from Wisconsin
