= Frank Black and the Catholics: The Complete Recordings =

Compilation album by Frank Black and the Catholics
- Released: 6 April 2015 (UK); 7 April 2015 (US)
- Recorded: 1997–2003
- Genre: Rock; alternative rock
- Length: 7:17:16
- Label: Cooking Vinyl
- Producer: Frank Black; Nick Vincent; Eric Drew Feldman; Frank Black and the Catholics; Ben Mumphrey; Stan Ridgway

Frank Black and the Catholics chronology
Snake Oil (2006)	Frank Black and the Catholics: The Complete Recordings (2015)

Frank Black chronology
Paley & Francis (2011)	Frank Black and the Catholics: The Complete Recordings (2015)

Professional ratings
Aggregate scores
Source	Rating
Metacritic	76/100
Review scores
Source	Rating
AllMusic	4/5 stars
Exclaim!	7/10
Record Collector	4/5 stars
The Spill Magazine	4/5 stars

Frank Black and the Catholics: The Complete Recordings is a 7-CD box set compilation by Frank Black and the Catholics, released by Cooking Vinyl in April 2015. Containing 132 songs, it collects all of the band's six studio albums as well as B-sides, unreleased tracks, alternate takes, the officially unreleased Sunday Sunny Mill Valley Groove Day album and the True Blue bonus disc, containing demos for the Black Letter Days album. Unusually, all tracks are listed alphabetically rather than chronologically through all seven discs. All tracks have been remastered from the original live-to-two-track and one-track recordings for this release.

== Background ==
Talking to Songfacts in 2015 about the reason for the box set, Black said: "I suppose that as Cooking Vinyl's distributor in the US went out of business some years ago, I realized many of my records were going out of print, especially from the Catholics era. A box set is a way to revitalize a body of work, and to usher in new distribution."

Explaining the decision to present the tracks in alphabetical order rather than in their original album format, Black said in a press release: "It feels like an approximation of randomness and it's a way to randomise something, especially if it's titles. We get away from the preciousness of LPs we put out and its more about the body of work, the good times that we had."

True Blue

The bonus disc True Blue features a number of "technical demos" that engineer Ben Mumphrey discovered in his New Orleans recording archive. He wrote in the set's liner notes: "These songs were recorded with the intention of being demos, to be sent to the Catholics band to learn before they traveled to Los Angeles to record the album Black Letter Days. ... We recorded in the temporarily empty "B" room in Sound City Studios in Los Angeles, where many of Mr. Black's local musician friends came by to help out. In return, exquisite evening buffets were provided for all, which Frank Black himself brought to the studio nightly and spread out. Everyone played, ate, talked, and was merry. These songs were the result."

== Reception ==
The album received generally favorable reviews from critics. Record Collector wrote, "It’s probably foolish to conceive of Frank Black and the Catholics' body of work meriting the reverence afforded to Pixies' illustrious canon, yet the holy-rolling mass they deliver across these six, eccentrically compiled CDs is still enough to make most God-fearing rock’n’rollers believe in miracles." AllMusic wrote, "This reshuffled order just might remind fans how consistent Black's output was during this time, and how well the band's stripped-down approach suited his songwriting." AllMusic felt that the best songs of the set "serve as a reminder that Black developed into a more mature, but still playful, writer during the Catholics years."

Magnet magazine felt that as a whole, the box set "quiets the lingering misconception that after the Pixies, Black's best work was behind him." Uncut wrote that "Only those with blind faith could love everything here, but dipping in randomly produces gems."

The Spill Magazine was positive towards the alphabetically listed track order, writing, "The randomness of the album gives it a nice variety when listening to the album by mixing it up, rather than progressing through the different phases of the band." PopMatters felt the same, writing that "this seemingly arbitrary decision actually adds an element of fascination to this box set [and] lets us consider the songs free from their original context. It makes for a new set of odd clashes." They called the bonus disc "uniformly excellent" and added, "Despite being demos, True Blue sounds like a fully formed and excellent seventh album from Frank Black and the Catholics."

Exclaim! was less positive, writing that Black's "mystifying decision to release all of the material alphabetically (rather than chronologically) alongside the lack of extensive liner notes and the inclusion of a mostly disappointing bonus disc ... The Complete Recordings feels less celebratory than perfunctory."

== Track listing ==
All songs written by Frank Black unless otherwise indicated.

CD one (Al-Co)
No.	Title	Writer(s)	Place of origin	Length
1.	"All My Ghosts"		Frank Black and the Catholics, 1998	3:14
2.	"Angst"		Sunday Sunny Mill Valley Groove Day, 2000; B-side to "Robert Onion", 2000	1:36
3.	"Are You Headed My Way?"		Devil's Workshop, 2002	2:04
4.	"Back to Rome"		Frank Black and the Catholics	3:25
5.	"Bad Harmony"		Pistolero, 1999	3:19
6.	"Bartholomew"		Devil's Workshop	2:26
7.	"Belle Isle"	Traditional	Snake Oil, 2006	2:36
8.	"The Big Hurt"	Wayne Shanklin	B-side to "Dog Gone", 1998	1:53
9.	"Billy Radcliffe"		Pistolero	2:21
10.	"Black Letter Day"		Black Letter Days, 2002	3:28
11.	"The Black Rider (Rock Version)"	Tom Waits	Black Letter Days	2:35
12.	"The Black Rider (Surf Version)"	Waits	Black Letter Days	3:09
13.	"Blast Off"		Dog in the Sand, 2001	7:13
14.	"Blizzard 1989"		Previously unreleased	2:43
15.	"Bullet"		Dog in the Sand	3:24
16.	"California Bound"		Black Letter Days	3:21
17.	"Changing of the Guards"	Bob Dylan	Previously unreleased	6:55
18.	"Changing of the Guards"	Dylan	B-side to "All My Ghosts", 1998	6:36
19.	"Chip Away Boy"		Black Letter Days	2:54
20.	"Coastline"		Show Me Your Tears, 2003	1:56

CD two (Co-Ho)
No.	Title	Writer(s)	Place of origin	Length
1.	"Cold Heart Of Stone"		Black Letter Days	3:18
2.	"Constant Sorrow Man"		Sunday Sunny Mill Valley Groove Day; B-side to "St. Francis Dam Disaster", 2001	3:25
3.	"A Dab'll Do Ya"		iTunes Exclusive, 2003	2:49
4.	"Do Nothing"	Lynval Golding	B-side to "I Gotta Move", 1998	2:56
5.	"Do You Feel Bad About It?"		Frank Black and the Catholics	2:07
6.	"Dog Gone"		Frank Black and the Catholics	2:59
7.	"Dog in the Sand"		Dog in the Sand	3:48
8.	"Don't Clip Your Wings"		iTunes Exclusive, 2003	1:51
9.	"Down in the Hole"	Mick Jagger, Keith Richards	B-side to "Everything Is New", 2003	3:09
10.	"End of Miles"		Black Letter Days	3:48
11.	"End of Miles"		Previously unreleased	2:48
12.	"Everything Is New"		Show Me Your Tears	3:52
13.	"The Farewell Bend"		Black Letter Days	3:21
14.	"Fields of Marigold"		Devil's Workshop	3:06
15.	"Goodbye Lorraine"		Show Me Your Tears	2:36
16.	"Heloise"		Devil's Workshop	3:51
17.	"Hermaphroditos (Is My Name)"		Dog in the Sand	4:12
18.	"His Kingly Cave"		Devil's Workshop	4:42
19.	"Horrible Day"		Show Me Your Tears	3:36
20.	"How You Went So Far"		Black Letter Days	4:19

CD three (Hu-Ki)
No.	Title	Writer(s)	Place of Origin	Length
1.	"Humboldt County Massacre" (Version 1)		Sunday Sunny Mill Valley Groove Day	2:03
2.	"Humboldt County Massacre" (Version 2)		B-side to "I Gotta Move" (Promo)	2:37
3.	"Humboldt County Massacre" (Version 3)		B-side to "All My Ghosts"	1:44
4.	"I Gotta Move"		Frank Black and The Catholics	3:39
5.	"I Love Your Brain"		Pistolero	3:49
6.	"I Need Peace"		Frank Black and The Catholics	5:13
7.	"I Switched You"		Pistolero	5:58
8.	"I Think I'm Starting to Lose It"		Pistolero	2:10
9.	"I Want Rock & Roll"		Pistolero	3:07
10.	"I Will Run After You"		Black Letter Days	3:59
11.	"I Will Run After You"		Sunday Sunny Mill Valley Groove Day	3:52
12.	"I'll Be Blue"		Dog in the Sand	3:32
13.	"I'm Going Down"	Bruce Springsteen	B-side to "Dog Gone"	2:59
14.	"I've Seen Your Picture"		Dog in the Sand	2:52
15.	"If It Takes All Night"		Dog in the Sand	3:20
16.	"Jaina Blues"		Show Me Your Tears	3:59
17.	"Jane the Queen of Love"		Black Letter Days	3:32
18.	"Jet Black River"		Black Letter Days	1:51
19.	"John the Revelator"	Traditional, adapted by Son House	Previously unreleased	4:37
20.	"King & Queen of Siam"		Frank Black and The Catholics	2:51

CD four (Le-Sc)
No.	Title	Place of origin	Length
1.	"Le Cigare Volant"	Sunday Sunny Mill Valley Groove Day; One More Road for the Hit, 2006	2:26
2.	"Living on Soul" (Version 1)	B-side to "All My Ghosts"	2:43
3.	"Living on Soul" (Version 2)	Previously unreleased	2:39
4.	"Llano del Rio"	Dog in the Sand	4:10
5.	"Ludwigshafen"	One More Road for the Hit	2:17
6.	"The Man Who Was Too Loud"	Frank Black and The Catholics	3:22
7.	"Manitoba"	Show Me Your Tears	4:35
8.	"Massif Centrale"	Show Me Your Tears	4:56
9.	"Modern Age"	Devil's Workshop	2:55
10.	"My Favorite Kiss"	Show Me Your Tears	2:08
11.	"Nadine"	Show Me Your Tears	3:01
12.	"Nadine" (Version 2)	Previously unreleased	1:51
13.	"New House of the Pope"	Show Me Your Tears	3:30
14.	"Out of State"	Devil's Workshop	2:30
15.	"Pan American Highway"	Sunday Sunny Mill Valley Groove Day, B-side to "Robert Onion"	4:18
16.	"Pray for the Girls"	Heroes and Villains: Music Inspired by the Powerpuff Girls, 2000	3:37
17.	"Preacher's Daughter"	iTunes Exclusive, 2003	3:11
18.	"Robert Onion"	Dog in the Sand	4:02
19.	"San Antonio, TX"	Devil's Workshop	3:48
20.	"The Scene"	Devil's Workshop	2:29

CD five (Se-Su)
No.	Title	Writer(s)	Place of origin	Length
1.	"Selkie Bride"		Previously unreleased	2:40
2.	"Selkie Bride" (Instrumental)		Previously unreleased	1:59
3.	"Show Me Your Tears"		iTunes Exclusive, 2003	1:42
4.	"Song of the Shrimp"	Sid Tepper, Roy C. Bennett	Previously unreleased	2:39
5.	"Sister Isabelle"	Del Shannon, Brian Hyland	Previously unreleased	3:37
6.	"Six-Sixty-Six"	Larry Norman	Frank Black and The Catholics	3:05
7.	"Skeleton Man"		Pistolero	3:10
8.	"Sleep"	Donovan Leitch	Sunday Sunny Mill Valley Groove Day	2:38
9.	"Smoke Up"		Pistolero	2:56
10.	"The Snake"		Show Me Your Tears	2:06
11.	"Snake Oil"		Snake Oil	2:45
12.	"So Hard to Make Things Out"		Pistolero	5:39
13.	"So. Bay"		Pistolero	4:58
14.	"Solid Gold"		Frank Black and The Catholics	4:16
15.	"Some Things (I Can't Get Used to)"	Jon E. Risk, Joseph Pope	Snake Oil; Devil's Workshop outtake	3:27
16.	"Southbound Bevy"		Black Letter Days	3:03
17.	"St. Francis Dam Disaster"		Dog in the Sand	4:59
18.	"Steak 'n' Sabre"		Frank Black and the Catholics	3:48
19.	"Stupid Me"		Dog in the Sand	2:34
20.	"Suffering"		Frank Black and the Catholics	2:50

CD six (Su-18)
No.	Title	Writer(s)	Place of origin	Length
1.	"Sunday Sunny Mill Valley Groove Day"	Doug Sahm	Sunday Sunny Mill Valley Groove Day	5:12
2.	"The Swimmer"		Dog in the Sand	2:46
3.	"Take What You Want"	Reid Paley	B-side to "Everything Is New"	2:32
4.	"This Old Heartache"		Show Me Your Tears	3:28
5.	"Tiny Heart"		Pistolero	3:29
6.	"True Blue"		Black Letter Days	1:51
7.	"Valentine and Garuda"		Black Letter Days	3:15
8.	"Valley of Our Hope"		Pistolero; Japanese bonus track	4:16
9.	"Velvety"		Devil's Workshop	2:28
10.	"Western Star"		Pistolero	3:13
11.	"When Will Happiness Find Me Again?"		Show Me Your Tears	2:22
12.	"Whiskey in Your Shoes"		Devil's Workshop	3:08
13.	"Whiskey in Your Shoes"		Previously unreleased	2:24
14.	"Whispering Weeds"		Previously unreleased	2:30
15.	"Whispering Weeds"		Black Letter Days	3:39
16.	"You're Such a Wire"		Pistolero	2:08
17.	"21 Reasons"		Black Letter Days	5:40
18.	"85 Weeks"		Pistolero	2:32
19.	"1826"		Black Letter Days	6:49
20.	"1826"		Previously unreleased	5:06

CD seven (True Blue)
No.	Title	Length
1.	"Black Letter Day"	2:57
2.	"California Bound"	3:33
3.	"Chip Away Boy"	2:10
4.	"Cold Heart of Stone"	3:19
5.	"How You Went So Far"	3:18
6.	"Jane the Queen of Love"	4:07
7.	"Jet Black River"	1:26
8.	"Southbound Bevy"	3:02
9.	"The End of Miles"	2:42
10.	"The Farewell Bend"	3:30
11.	"Valentine and Garuda"	2:59
12.	"Whispering Weeds"	2:19

== Personnel ==
Adapted from the album's liner notes.

Frank Black and the Catholics

- Frank Black – vocals, guitar
- Scott Boutier – drums, bells, backing vocals
- Eric Drew Feldman – keyboards, synthesizer, organ, backing vocals
- Rich Gilbert – guitar, pedal steel guitar, keyboards, piano, saxophone, backing vocals
- David McCaffrey – bass, backing vocals
- David Philips – guitar, pedal steel guitar, backing vocals
- Lyle Workman – guitar

Additional musicians

- Jean Black – backing vocals
- Cynthia Haagens – backing vocals
- Jack Kidney – saxophone, harmonica
- Rob Laufer – keyboards, backing vocals
- Keith Moliné – guitar
- Ben Mumphrey – maracas
- Van Dyke Parks – piano, accordion
- Andy J. Perkins – trumpet
- Eric Potter – backing vocals
- Stan Ridgway – keyboards, harmonica, melodica, banjo, percussion, backing vocals
- Joey Santiago – guitar
- Moris Tepper – guitar, banjo, bihuela, backing vocals
- Nick Vincent – percussion
- Pietra Wexstun – backing vocals

Technical

- Frank Black – producer, cover painting
- Frank Black and the Catholics – producer
- Billy Joe Bowers – engineer
- Jeremy Dubs – archive work
- Eric Drew Feldman – producer
- Kevin Ink – engineer
- Wesley James – archive work
- Mark Lemhouse – design
- Ben Mumphrey – producer, engineer
- Stan Ridgway – producer
- Dave Shiffman – engineer
- Eddie Shreyer – remastering
- Nick Vincent – producer

True Blue

Musicians

- Frank Black – vocals, acoustic and electric guitar
- Colleen Browne – bass
- Eric Drew Feldman – keyboards, drums, piano
- Brian MacLeod – drums
- Justin Meldal-Johnsen – bass
- Ben Mize – drums
- David Philips – pedal steel guitar, electric guitar, bass, backing vocals
- Eric Schermerhorn – guitar
- Tommy Stinson – bass
- Nick Vincent – drums
- Greg Vorobiov – bass
- Lyle Workman – electric guitar

Technical

- Ben Mumphrey – producer, engineer
- Recorded live to 1-track, September–November 2001, Sound City Studios, Los Angeles, California.
- Mastered at Studio in the Country, Bogalusa, Louisiana, August 2014.
