= Jon Tiven =

American record producer

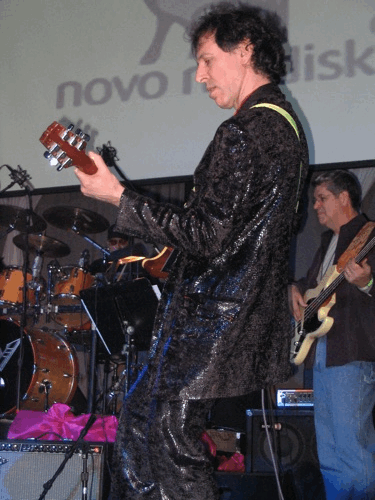
- Jon Tiven - Live in Concert

Background information
- Born: January 3, 1955 (age 70); New Haven, Connecticut, United States

Jon Tiven (born January 3, 1955) is an American composer, guitarist, record producer, and music journalist. He has produced albums by Wilson Pickett, Frank Black and Don Covay as well as a series of tribute albums paying tribute to the songwriting of Don Covay, Arthur Alexander, Otis Blackwell, Curtis Mayfield, and Van Morrison. He was also the co-founder of the Memphis power pop band Prix, as well as the bands The Yankees and The Jon Tiven Group.

== Early career ==
Tiven was born in New Haven, Connecticut. He began his career as a music journalist in the late 1960s, writing for Rolling Stone, Fusion, Melody Maker, and a host of other magazines. Initially an alto saxophonist, he taught himself to play a variety of instruments and became fairly adept at guitar, enough to write songs and accompany himself. After a brief flirtation with higher education at Yale University and Sarah Lawrence College (1972–74), he dropped out to pursue his musical career. In 1975 Tiven went to work for Chess Records in New York, but quickly saw that working inside a record company was not his calling, and travelled to Memphis to produce Alex Chilton's first solo album, Bach's Bottom.

== Prix ==
After the Chilton sessions, Tiven formed the power pop group Prix with Tommy Hoehn, co-producing the recording of eleven songs at Memphis's Ardent Studios along with Big Star co-founder Chris Bell, who also contributed guitar and background vocals. Tiven brought in Chilton to participate in the recordings as well. In 1976, Tiven returned to New York, where Columbia/CBS Records offered to sign Prix after a showcase performance. Tiven declined the offer, and then negotiated with Mercury Records, who eventually withdrew their third offer. In 1977, Tiven licensed both the Prix and Chilton masters to Ork Records, which released a double A side Prix single and released the Chilton recordings as an EP entitled The Singer Not The Song. After the Prix single was released, and Ork founder Terry Ork indicated he would be booking the group at CBGB, Hoehn left New York, not wanting to remain in the city any longer. Although the group broke up, Miracle Records released another Prix single the following year.

== Productions and projects ==
After the break-up of Prix, Tiven began working for Big Sound Records, where he produced records by Van Duren and his own band The Yankees, but, losing faith in those running the label, he became totally independent. In addition to playing on sessions for artists such as Major Lance ("I've Got A Right To Cry") and The Rolling Stones (I'm Going Down), Tiven honed his craft as a member of The Jim Carroll Band, as a guitarist/organist and also co-writing with Carroll the title song of the second album (Dry Dreams). Befriended by John Belushi, he formed The Tom Davis Experience featuring Al Franken with the two comedians, and had a featured acting role as well as writing five songs for their film One More Saturday Night (Columbia Pictures, 1986) produced by Dan Aykroyd.

== Compositions ==
Other artists such as Rick Derringer, Barrence Whitfield & the Savages, and The Symptoms started recording his songs, and Tiven dedicated himself to primarily writing songs for other artists. In 1985 he renewed a friendship with his hero Don Covay, and they wrote, performed, and recorded together through 2001. Tiven started having some Billboard Hot 100 chart success with covered songs recorded by Huey Lewis and the News and The Jeff Healey Band, and Tiven then submitted some songs to B.B. King to record. The sessions Tiven produced and wrote by B.B. King were parcelled out on several releases, including Here and There, a European release Lucille & Friends, and the Grammy Award-winning box set King of the Blues. From that time on Tiven would distinguish himself in the soul and blues genres, writing and producing new albums by Don Covay, Syl Johnson, Donnie Fritts, Freddie Scott, and Mack Rice, among others. He coaxed Arthur Alexander out of retirement in 1990 and, in 1998, produced and co-wrote Wilson Pickett's first album in seventeen years, It's Harder Now, which won three W.C. Handy Awards and was nominated for a Grammy.

Tiven continued to have his songs recorded by other artists. Robert Cray had a top seller with the cover "24-7 Man," Johnny Winter with "I Smell Smoke," Buddy Guy with "Midnight Train," Shemekia Copeland with "Married To The Blues," Irma Thomas with "Trying To Catch A Cab In The Rain," and Australian Ian Moss with "Mr. Rain."

== The Jon Tiven Group ==
The Jon Tiven Group recorded and released two albums in the 1990s: Blue Guru and Yes I Ram. The members were Jon Tiven (guitar), Alan Merrill (lead vocals), Sally Tiven (bass guitar) and Todd Snare (drums). The two albums resulted in many cover versions of the band's songs by artists such as Wilson Pickett, Huey Lewis and the News, Jeff Healey, B. B. King, Robert Cray, Billie Ray Martin, Buddy Guy, "Sir" Mack Rice, and Freddie Scott.

=== Discography ===
==== Albums ====
- Blue Guru (1996)
- Yes I Ram (1999)

==== Single ====
- "He Don't Know" (1996)

== Current ==
After the Jon Tiven Group disbanded, Tiven produced and co-wrote a series of albums with soul/blues singer Ellis Hooks. Moving from New York to Nashville in 2002, he produced a series of albums by Frank Black. In 2004 he produced and co-wrote what would become Little Milton's last recorded effort Think Of Me, which was released in 2005 and received four W.C. Handy Awards in 2006 including Song of the Year and Album of the Year. In 2006, he produced Sailover, by P.F. Sloan for Hightone Records, as well as What I Was Running From, the debut album by Indiana singer/songwriter Don Pedigo. He continued to have his songs recorded by soul and blues artists, including Billy Price, Ricky Fanté, Gigi Dover, Hard Bargain featuring Arthur Canady, Rock Bottom, and Jim Quick & Coastline.

In 2007, Tiven produced and co-wrote Intuition, the first recordings in thirty-seven years by soul singer Betty Harris. He continued his work with Ellis Hooks by producing Another Saturday Morning, the sixth album by the Alabama soul-blues musician. Tiven also helmed the chart-topping American debut Sofa King Badass by Mason Casey. Touring Europe with a new band Jon Tiven & the Nashville Aces, he introduced his nine-piece outfit backing Ellis, Betty, and Mack Rice. In 2007, Tiven produced an album by former Grass Roots member Creed Bratton (also known as a cast member of the television show The Office).

In 2008, Tiven produced and co-wrote a new album by Howard Tate entitled Blue Day. Tiven also produced a new gospel-tinged album by Garnet Mimms entitled Is Anybody Out There?. He also co-produced/co-wrote a new record with Felix Cavaliere and Steve Cropper for Stax Records called Nudge It Up A Notch, which was nominated for a Grammy Award for Best Pop Instrumental Performance.

Tiven continued songwriting, collaborating with Chuck Mead, Stewart Francke, Billy Price/Fred Chapellier and Syl Johnson for their upcoming releases. Tiven is credited as a writer on over 400 recorded songs.

In 2009, Tiven began creating a string of narrative Soul Operas. His first, entitled "I Sold Out" features the voices of James Jackson Toth, Cowboy Jack Clement, Buddy Miller, Chuck Mead, Bekka Bramlett and Felix Cavaliere. He is currently working on the follow-up, "Skin On The Wheel Of Time," sung by Ellis Hooks, Jonell Mosser, and Steve Kalinich and featuring songs Tiven wrote with the aforementioned three plus Bob Mosley, Billie Ray Martin, Roger Reale, Charlie Feldman, Keith Reid, Joe Bonamassa, Jimmy Vivino, Wayne Carson, Steve Kalinich, and Thomas Cain.

2010 saw Tiven producing a new blues album by Troy Turner, as well as the co-writer of songs recorded by Shaun Murphy, Guitar Shorty, Alabama Mike, Tara Holloway, Erya Lyytinen, Colin Gilmore, Kirsten Thien. He also embarked on producing new CDs by Steve Cropper and the duo of Frank Black and Reid Paley a.k.a. Paley & Francis. In 2011 he performed several concerts with Steve Cropper to promote the album Dedicated: A Salute to the 5 Royales, featuring Bettye LaVette, Dylan Leblanc, Ellis Hooks, Maxine Brown, Ben Drew (Plan B), K Flay, and Theresa & Emily of the band Warpaint.

In 2012, Ruthie Foster's Let It Burn album was released, which featured the single "Aim For The Heart" written by Tiven, his wife Sally, and Foster. Tiven formed the group YO MA MA with lyricist Stephen Kalinich, and with the help of rhythm section Cody Dickinson and Sally Tiven, guest guitarists/co-writers Brian May and Steve Cropper, and singer Willie Jones recorded a double album, Shortcuts To Infinity/Symptomology, which they produced with Mark Linett. Tiven also wrote songs with Andreas Werner, Paul Rodgers, and Mary Katherine Rowe.

Tiven further distinguished himself in 2013 writing chart records by Leslie West, J.J. Thames, and Chuck Mead. 2014 saw the release of 78-year-old Willie Jones' debut album Fire In My Soul, produced and cowritten by Tiven, receiving rave reviews worldwide. Tiven reunited with an old friend, the legendary Bebe Buell, and produced/cowrote her single "Secret Sister" b/w "Hello Music City."

In 2015, the first recordings Tiven produced (Chilton, Prix, and Mick Farren) were all part of an Ork Records anthology released by the Numero Group. In fact, this same year the Prix recordings were also released as the full-length album Historix on vinyl and compact disc by HozAc Records, including some never-before-heard mixes. Although the album had been issued in Japan in 2002, the only Prix recordings previously available in America were the group's two contemporaneous singles, two Prix recordings included on Tommy Hoehn's 1978 major label solo debut Losing You to Sleep, and cuts on anthologies. Although Hoehn had died in 2010, Tiven initiated new Prix recordings, partnering with singer/songwriter Sid Herring, best known for fronting The Gants.

Collaborator Tara Holloway inked a new record deal with Light Organ Records, and not only did she record four songs co-written by Tiven on Little Ghosts, she brought him to Ottawa to play guitar, sitar, tenor sax, and keyboard on the album. Shaun Murphy (former Little Feat singer who had recorded three Tiven songs in the past) collaborated with Tiven and wife Sally for a new song "24 Hours From Memphis" on her CD Loretta, and the Brothers of Brazil released a new album Melodies From Hell which Tiven co-produced.

Tiven's partnership with transcendental poet Stephen J. Kalinich continued to thrive with the release of their second album, Each Soul Has A Voice, as Kalinich's vocal presence increased significantly from the previous record. Tiven took that as a cue to begin producing Stephen Kalinich's first solo as a singer, Scrambled Eggs, featuring duets with Black Francis, Bekka Bramlett, Dylan LeBlanc, Willie Jones, and Tara Holloway. His partnership with Steve Kalinich also forged a new Ellis Hooks album Needle In A Haystack for Blues Blvd Records, which featured twelve new songs written by Hooks/Tiven/Kalinich, and a thirteenth which included the writing and guitar playing talents of the great Steve Cropper. This is the first recording Ellis had done in some time, and Kalinich not only cowrote but coproduced and did some recitation on the record as well.

Tiven also produced a new version of the classic Don Nix song "Goin' Down" by Leslie West for his new album (Soundcheck), with guest Brian May trading fiery fretwork with Leslie.

A record Tiven initially began producing in the late 1990s by Billie Ray Martin was finally completed and issued as The Soul Tapes. Entering Billboard's Dance/Club charts at #44 in its first week, "Glittering Gutter" (the first single) became one of Tiven's most successful records, and demonstrated Tiven's triple threat: producer, cowriter, musician. Eight remixes by the likes of Mooli, Offer Nissim, Tweaka Turner and Dave Aude were issued and offered new windows into this enigmatic song.

In 2019, Tiven cowrote and coproduced country star Marty Brown's first record in several decades, American Highway, to rave reviews, and cowrote "Close To Home" for Country/Americana legend Chuck Mead's album of the same name. The album he produced for powerpop's Van Duren in 1978 "Are You Serious? was the subject of a documentary film "Waiting" and the recordings saw a re-release that got more attention than the original. Also from the same period was Reptiles in Motion, an album by Roger C. Reale & Rue Morgue featuring two Tiven cowrites and Mick Ronson on guitar. A single by Willie Jones was issued on the Pravda label that Willie and Tiven wrote and Tiven produced, and Willie was able to tour Europe to promote it. Late in the year, the debut album by Handsome Dick Manitoba entitled Born In The Bronx was released, produced and cowritten by Jon Tiven.

In 2020, in the midst of a pandemic lockdown, Tiven and longtime collaborator Steve Cropper began finishing some songs they had started many years earlier, with the help from lyricist/vocalist Roger C. Reale. Reale sang all of his vocals into his iPhone from his home in Connecticut, not meeting Cropper himself face to face until after the release of the album. Adding Nioshi Jackson on drums, it became Steve Cropper's album Fire It Up. Entering the Billboard Blues charts at #1 and remaining in the top ten for well over a month, Fire It Up received a score of 66 on critical aggregator Metacritic, indicating generally favorable reviews.
