= Colorado Compassion Club =

Medical marijuana dispensary in Colorado, US

The Colorado Compassion Club was a medical marijuana dispensary in Colorado. It was founded in 2004 with a storefront that was opened in 2005. In 2006 it registered with the Colorado Secretary of State, making it the first medical marijuana dispensary in the state of Colorado. This planted the seed in Colorado that grew into the first state to legalize recreational use by the Colorado Amendment 64 on November 6, 2012 along with the state of Washington.

== Founding ==
Founded by Thomas and Larisa Lawrence, the Colorado Compassion Club set a precedent that would lead to the legitimization of the medical marijuana industry. Established before Colorado HB-1284 that set forth regulations for the medical marijuana industry, the Colorado Compassion Club laid the foundation that set industry standards. Other founding members included Ken Gorman, Scott Fry and Anton Marquez. The Colorado Compassion Club first began as an organization that strives to provide safe access to medical marijuana for qualifying patients, trained caregivers and provided resources for patients and caregivers seeking to become legal under 0-4-287 - ARTICLE XVIII of the Colorado State Constitution, also known as Amendment 20, allowing the medicinal use of marijuana for qualifying conditions. The Colorado Compassion Club was the first organization that held public meetings for people to learn more about becoming registered patients and caregivers, and with the help of Ken Gorman, found doctors that were willing to sign recommendations leading to an influx of patients and caregivers.

== Legal issues ==
After a raid from local and federal authorities in 2004, The Colorado Compassion Club, decided the next best course of action would be to go more public in helping others and began dispensing medical marijuana to chronically ill patients on a weekly basis from the Grant Avenue United Methodist Church, followed by a permanent establishment on Colfax Avenue. The founders of the Colorado Compassion Club made great sacrifices in trailblazing the medical marijuana industry so that others could follow suit. Using a strong relationship with the media, grassroots activists and local politicians, Thomas and Larisa pioneered the legitimization of medical marijuana and were also the first people in the state to get confiscated marijuana back from the police without wasting public time or dollars. The founding members of the Colorado Compassion Club, were the “canaries in the coal mine” and showed the state of Colorado that it was possible to establish a medical marijuana center without further federal intervention while working with community leaders to exemplify a model for other leaders of the medical marijuana community to follow and build upon. The Colorado Compassion Club was dissolved in 2008.

== See also ==
- Drug policy of Colorado
