= Computer Automation =

Computer manufacturer

Computer Automation, Inc.
- Industry: Computer manufacturing
- Founded: 1968
- Defunct: 1992
- Headquarters: Richardson, Texas, United States
- Key people: David H Methvin (founder)
- Products: Naked Mini minicomputers Naked Milli minicomputers Marathon Automatic Test Systems (Functional Board Testers - In-Circuit Board Testers)

Computer Automation, Inc. was a minicomputer and industrial control computer manufacturer founded by David H. Methvin in 1968, based originally in Newport Beach, California, United States. It opened a sales, support and repair arm in the UK in 1972, based at Hertford House, Maple Cross, Rickmansworth, Hertfordshire. Later relocated to Suite 2 Milfield House, Croxley Centre, Croxley Green, Watford, Hertfordshire.

In 1981, they moved the corporate offices to Boulder, Colorado, manufacturing and sales remained in California. In 1985, the offices moved to Irvine, California. Finally in 1990 they moved to Richardson, Texas. They had previously opened a manufacturing and engineering development facility there in 1978 as a way to escape high California tax and labor rates.

The first products were the Computer Automation PDC 404 and PDC 808 "Programmed Digital Controllers". The PDC 808 announced circa July 1969 was designed for control, monitoring and/or data logging applications. It featured 4K 8-bit core memory expandable to 16K with DTL logic circuits.

In 1969, CA announced full production of the Model 816, a 16-bit general purpose computer using TTL integrated circuits for logic and a 3D core memory.

In 1971, CA introduced the Alpha 8, an 8-bit machine, and Alpha 16 which merely doubled up this concept to make a 16-bit machine. Both were built using DTL and TTL devices. The processor for the Alpha 8 and Alpha 16 each comprised three full sized circuit boards about 18 inches square, then there were the memory options, 4K, 8K and rarely 16K magnetic core full cards. There were number of options for data input, paper tape via a board called the utility controller which could also be used to drive other devices such as printers, etc. There was a magnetic tape controller which was a full card and a Winchester interface disk controller which was two full cards with a circuit board jumper which interlinked the two cards. The programmers console had a row of toggle switches for data entry of bootstrap routines, etc. Two chassis were available, standard and jumbo with separate power supplies. There were a variety of other cards available for various forms of input/output and process control, relay cards, dual teletype cards, etc.

In 1973, the LSI-1 was announced, a single board low-cost 16-bit computer. To achieve the ambitious goals, the company ventured into development of full-custom LSI chips: a 4-bit slice arithmetic logic unit and 3-chip control unit. The control unit was based on programmable logic arrays (PLA). The control unit PLA transformed the machine instructions and events into series of microinstructions to operate the ALU and related functions. The concept was conceived by Ken Gorman and was designed by Gorman and Roy Blacksher. Although the design was proven in the lab using first iteration chips, a disastrous processing error by chip foundry National Semiconductor during a bug-fix iteration caused a six-month schedule slip from which the project could not recover. Therefore, the LSI-1 never entered the marketplace. Gorman subsequently became manager of the Processor Development Department and oversaw computer processor engineering through 1975. For one project, Gorman worked with AMD in the conceptualization of the Am2900 4-bit slice chip that was employed in Computer Automation's high-end processors and gained widespread acceptance in the marketplace.

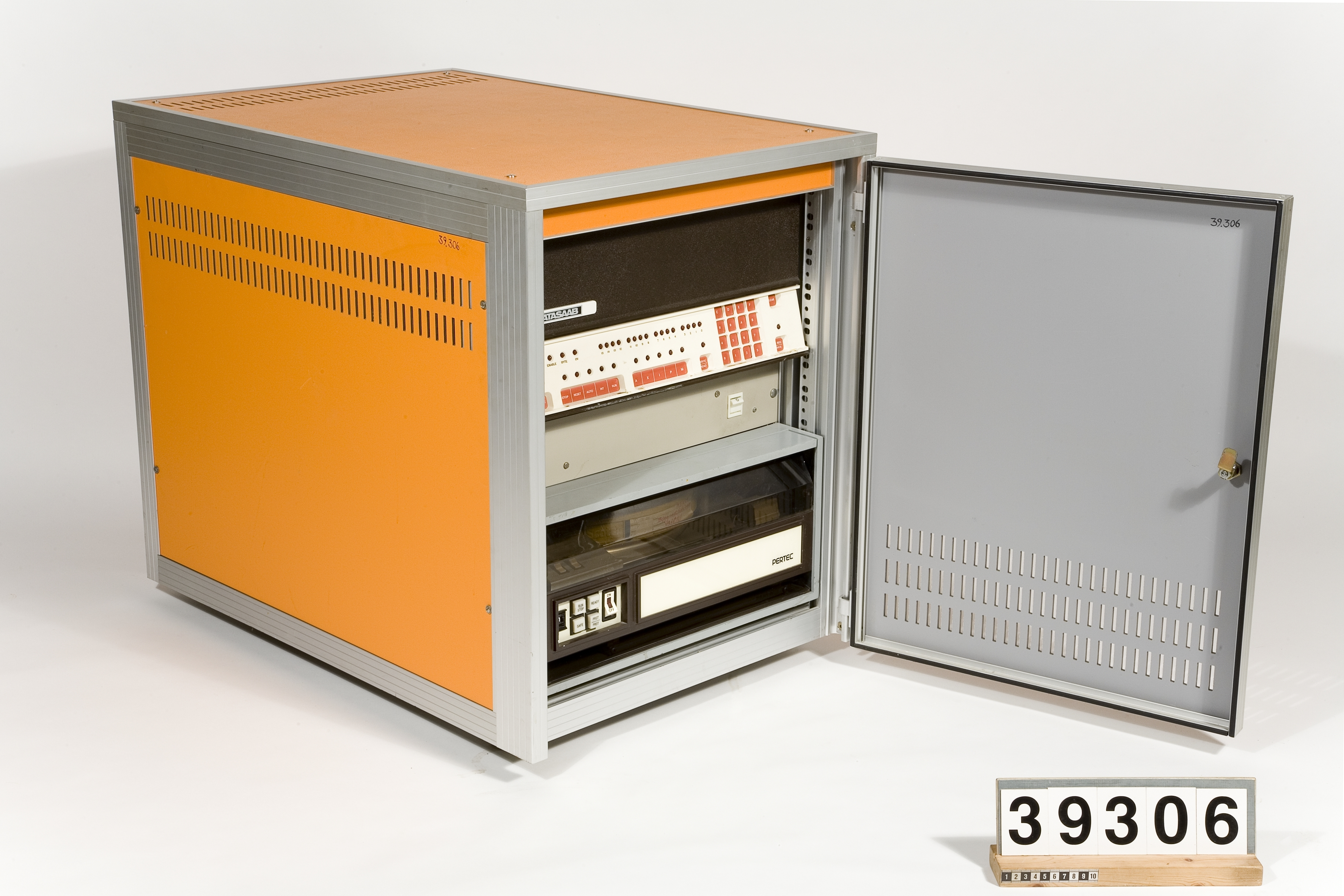
The Datasaab D16 computer was an OEM product based on the Alpha LSI-2. This specimen was used for a subscriber database for the Swedish periodical "Byggnadstidningen" 1975-1986. The operator panel is identical to the console of the LSI. This machine is in the collections of the Swedish National Museum of Science and Technology.

The LSI-1 was superseded by the deceptively-named LSI-2 which implemented the same architecture using MSI TTL logic and four 74181 ALU chips. The LSI-2 comprised a single full card with two piggyback half cards, on the lefthand side viewed from the back was the card containing the microcode in fuse link bipolar PROMs, on the right the options card with the bootstrap PROMs and serial interface for current loop teletype or RS-232 device. There were a couple of speed options of processor available, the 2/10 with a 10 MHz clock and 2/20 with a 20 MHz clock. Another option was the 2/60 which used different microcode on the half card to support an enhanced instruction set used uniquely by Computer Automation’s SyFa (System For access) data processing systems. There were two types of console available, the operator's console which merely had enough functionality to enable an operator to boot the system, and a programmer’s console which would enable data entry for bootstrap routines, etc. Memory options included magnetic core of between 4 and 16K and later semiconductor memory of up to 32K in a variety of formats, full card and half card. Bank switching, where blocks of memory could be switched in or out, to a degree bypassed the restrictions of a 16-bit address bus. The format for input/output devices remained the same as the Alpha 8 and Alpha 16 products, therefore many of the I/O devices for the earlier product could still be used. However, the LSI 2 had a different dual-card hard disk controller and a number of different options for half-card floppy controllers. The chassis available had five slots with internal PSU or nine slots with external PSU.

Both the Alpha systems and LSI systems were tested using a programme called QCD – quality-control diagnostic. There were a number of different versions of this around, for the Alpha machines on paper tape, hard disk or magnetic tape, and for the LSI systems paper tape, floppy disk, hard disk and magnetic tape. There were also other diagnostics for every product, many I/O devices requiring a wired loopback header connecting output to input in a particular pattern so that the device could test itself.

Another product of the mid-1970s was a cut down and cut-price half card processor, the 3/05. This had its own unique half card chassis and power supply, plus its own console.

In the late 1970s, a major redesign of the LSI-2 took place to integrate the two piggyback cards into the main full card, this became the 2/40 and 2/120. Another enhancement to speed operation was the introduction of cache in the form of another full card, plus an expansion of memory with 64K semiconductor modules in the form of a full card becoming available. Again the restrictions of the 16-bit address bus still meant bank switching was a necessity for memory-greedy applications. The increase speed of the "Super 2", as the systems were known, required a new revision of motherboard but this was backwards-compatible with the earlier systems.

Another product range emerged in the late 1970s, the Naked Mini 4 range of systems. These were still implemented in TTL but used a different and enhanced instruction set. They ranged from the 4/10, which was a half card replacement for the 3/05, through the full card 4/30 to the 4/95. Although there was some compatibility with a few of the I/O cards from the LSI-2, everything about the NM4 series was generally speaking unique. Naked Mini products saw extensive use in early computer controlled typesetting machines and automatic teller machines.

The 4/10 processor was based on a pair of custom LSI integrated circuits, the DATA chip and the CONTROL chip. The custom chips were fabricated by Western Digital and another California-based company was a second source. The microcode for controlling these chips was stored in four 8-bit wide bipolar PROMs. In 1978, the Richardson, Texas manufacturing facility added a small engineering development group headed by Frank J. Marshall that was tasked with building a small, low-cost 16-bit mini-computer product line using the LSI 4/10 custom chips. The resulting product line was the 4/04, also known as the SCOUT (Small Computer Optimized for Use by the Thousands) or Naked Milli. The 4/04 system used small (around 6 x 9 inches) circuit boards and made heavy used of PAL logic chips. The boards plugged into a chassis that had 4 to 12 slots for cards. One side of the chassis was the system power supply, which was 5 volt only. Boards that needed other voltages generated them with small DC-DC converters. The SCOUT had many advanced features for its time including built-in self test diagnostics, a plug-and-play driver and bootloader facility, and automatic memory address allocation for memory boards.

As Computer Automation moved into the 1980s, it became apparent that the concept of the minicomputer was becoming obsolete. Microprocessors such as the 8080, Z80 and 6502 could be incorporated into much process control equipment. The marketing and engineering groups at Computer Automation realized this and proposed a new product line and direction for the company to be called "Triad". This was to be based on Motorola microprocessors on the VME or Versa bus and running a Unix-based operating system. Dave Methvin, the founder and president of the company was adamantly opposed to non-proprietary systems and architectures and killed the project.

Computer Automation consisted of three divisions:

- Naked Mini which sold minicomputers to OEMs, where they were used in process control.
- IPD (Industrial Products Division) manufactured automatic test equipment. Computer Automation had designed an ATE to production test its own product in-house. CA decided this was a marketable product which was dubbed "Capable". The first Capable testers used an Alpha 16, later models used the LSI-2. These were functional ATE which ran a program against the UUT (Unit Under Test) to exercise all logic functions. A later development was the Marathon in-circuit tester, which as the name suggests measured viability of components in-circuit.
- SyFa (Systems for Access) manufactured programmable distributed data processing systems using the LSI 2/60 and later the 2/120 as the core. These were used by many companies to perform jobs such as stock control, order processing, etc. Originally the systems were manufactured and assembled in the States and shipped to the UK for commissioning, but by the late seventies a production facility was in place at a separate unit at Maple Cross near Rickmansworth in England.

In 1979, a production facility opened up at Clonshaugh in Dublin, taking advantage of tax concessions introduced by the Irish Government.

The company last filed a financial statement in 1992.
