= Ardent Studios =

Recording studio

Coordinates: 35°8′15″N 89°59′40″W

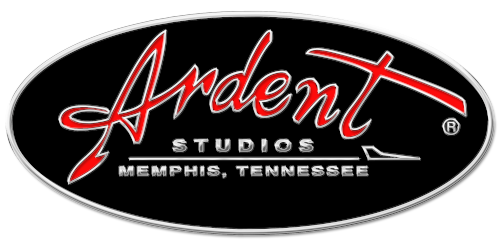
- Type: Public
- Industry: Music Recording
- Founder: John Fry, John King, and Fred Smith
- Headquarters: Memphis, Tennessee, United States
- Divisions: Ardent Records/Ardent Music

Ardent Studios is an American recording studio located in Memphis, Tennessee, United States. The studio was founded in the late 1950s by John King, Fred Smith, and John Fry. In 2026 it was reported to be temporarily closed due to ongoing lawsuits between the owners.

== History ==
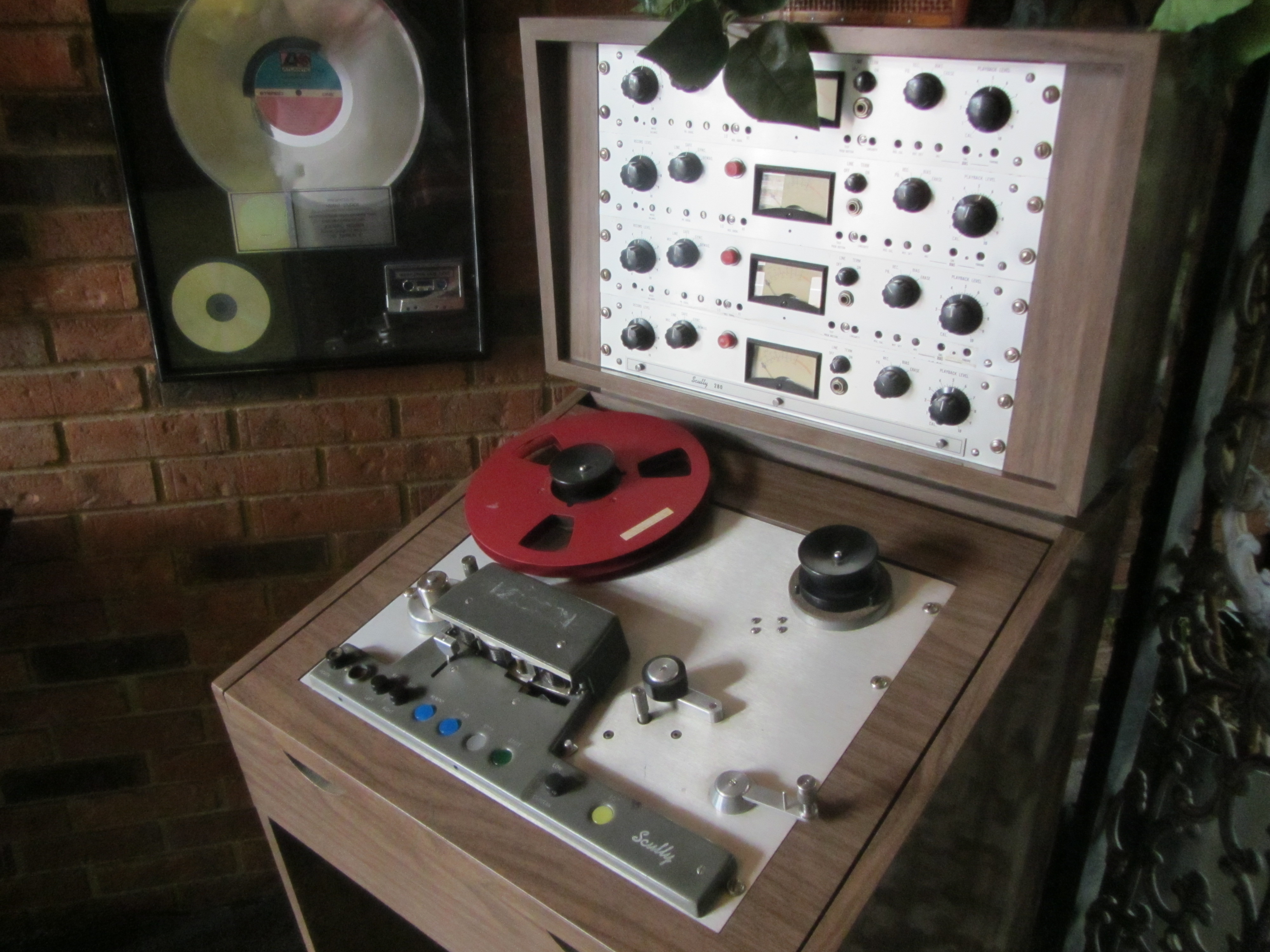
'60s recorder:
Scully 280 4tr

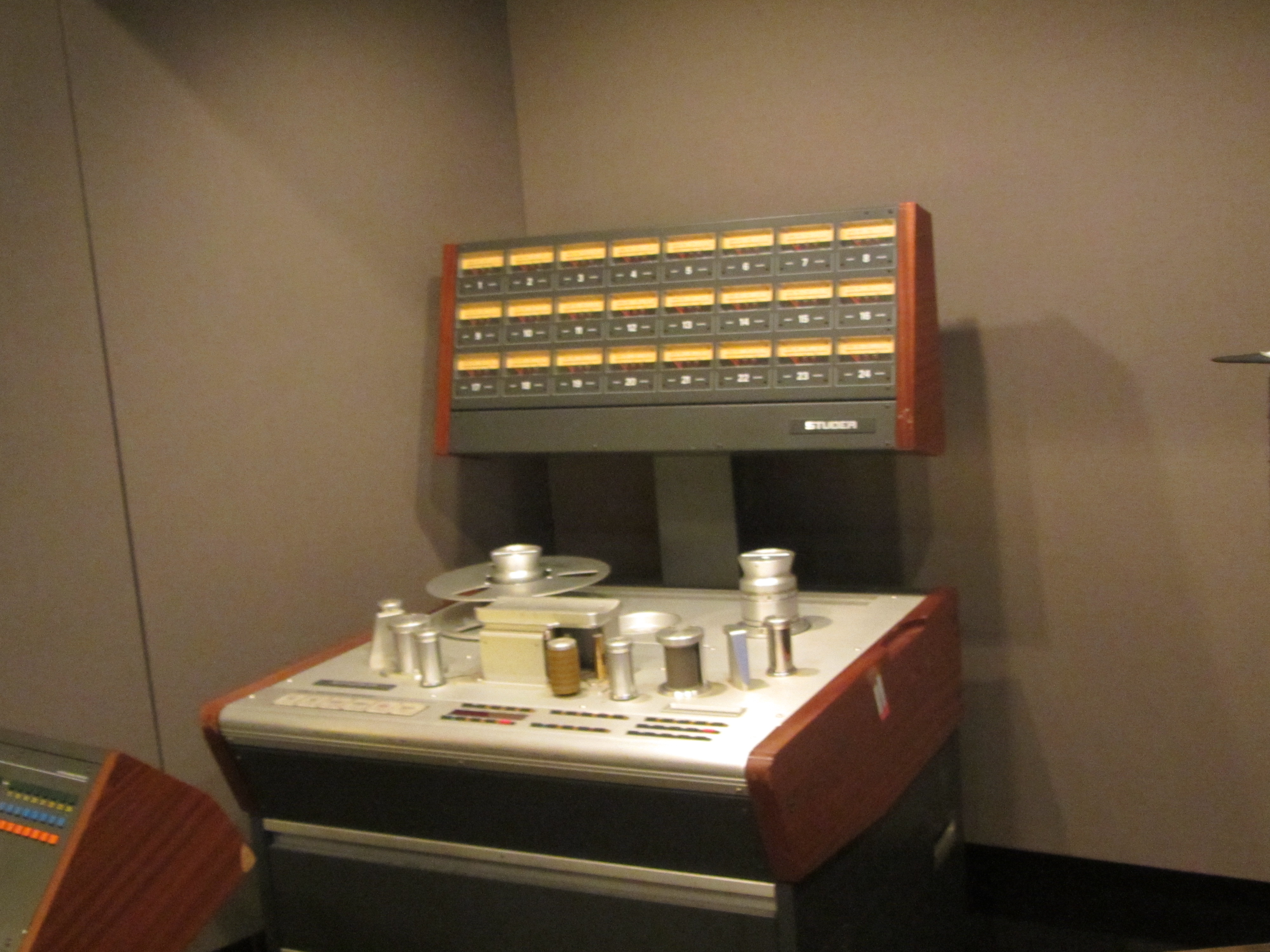
Later recorder:
Studer 827 24tr

Ardent Studios was founded by John Fry, John King, and Fred Smith, in 1959. Initially, it was a studio in John Fry's family garage, where he recorded his first 45s for the Ardent Records label. Equipment in the studio included an Altec tube mixing console, Ampex 2-track tape recorder, a Pultec equalizer, and Neumann microphones.

In 1966, the studio moved to a commercial location shared with a bookshop. Tom Dowd was consulting with Auditronics on an early multitrack console for nearby Stax Records, and Fry ordered the same input modules for his second mixing board. When the studio upgraded to a Scully 4-track tape recorder, Ardent became the first 4-track studio in Memphis. It was also the first studio in the area to use EMT plate reverbs.

Stevie Ray Vaughan soundcheck in Ardent Studios in 1989.

== Notable mentions ==
Ardent Studio recorded Sam & Dave, Led Zeppelin, Isaac Hayes, Leon Russell, and the Staples Singers, and in the 1970s, 1980s, and 1990s recorded James Taylor along with ZZ Top, The Tragically Hip, George Thorogood, The Allman Brothers, Bob Dylan, Gin Blossoms, R.E.M., Joe Walsh, and Jimmie and Stevie Ray Vaughan.

Ardent became home to young producers and engineers such as Jim Dickinson, Terry Manning, Joe Hardy, John Hampton, Paul Ebersold, and later Skidd Mills, Jeff Powell, Brad Blackwood, Pete Mathews, Jason Latshaw, and Don Bell.

The studio also helped record soundtracks for Hustle and Flow and Black Snake Moan.

== Notable artists ==
- .38 Special
- 3 Doors Down
- 8Ball & MJG
- Aaron Tippin
- Against Me!
- Al Green
- Alain Bashung
- Albert Collins
- Alex Chilton
- ALL
- Alvin Youngblood Hart
- Anita Ward
- Anthony Gomes
- Archers of Loaf
- Audio Adrenaline
- Bar-Kays
- B.B. King
- Big Star
- Big Tent Revival
- Black Oak Arkansas
- Black Rob
- Bobby Rush
- Bob Dylan
- Booker T & the MG's
- Cat Power
- Cheap Trick
- Coco Montoya
- Cracker
- Dave Matthews
- DC Talk
- DeGarmo and Key
- Dreams So Real
- Evanescence
- Fuel
- George Ducas
- George Thorogood
- Gin Blossoms
- Golden Smog
- Guy Sebastian
- Isaac Hayes
- James Taylor
- Jimmie Vaughan
- Joe Walsh
- John Hiatt
- Julien Baker
- Juvenile
- Led Zeppelin
- Love Bang
- Leon Russell
- Little Texas
- Lucero
- Lynyrd Skynyrd
- Mach Five
- Maria Taylor
- Marty Brown
- Marty Stuart
- M.I.A.
- Mika Nakashima
- Mikey Jukebox
- Mojo Nixon
- Montgomery Gentry
- Mudhoney
- North Mississippi Allstars
- Prehab
- Primal Scream
- Prix
- Puscifer
- R.E.M.
- Reverend Horton Heat
- Robert Cray
- Satellite Soul
- Screamin' Cheetah Wheelies
- Seven Mary Three
- Shawn Camp
- Sister Hazel
- Skillet
- Smalltown Poets
- Soundgarden
- Spacehog
- Steve Earle
- Stevie Ray Vaughan
- Tanya Tucker
- The Afghan Whigs
- The Allman Brothers
- The Angels
- The Box Tops
- The Cramps
- The Fabulous Thunderbirds
- The Georgia Satellites
- The Hooters
- The Posies
- The Raconteurs
- The Radiators
- The Replacements
- The Scruffs
- The Smashing Pumpkins
- The Tragically Hip
- The White Stripes
- Tim McCarver
- Todd Agnew
- Todd Snider
- Tom Cochrane
- Tommy Hoehn
- Toots Hibbert
- Travis Tritt
- Triple 6 Mafia
- Waylon Jennings
- Yo Gotti
- Zucchero
- ZZ Top

== Notable albums ==
- Al Green – Soul Survivor
- Alain Bashung – Osez Joséphine
- Alex Chilton – Like Flies on Sherbert
- Alvin Youngblood Hart – Motivational Speaker
- B.B. King – Blues Summit
- Big Star – Keep an Eye on the Sky, #1 Record, Radio City, Third/Sister Lovers
- Booker T. & the M.G.'s – Soul Limbo
- George Thorogood and the Destroyers – The Dirty Dozen, Bad to the Bone, Born to be Bad
- Gin Blossoms – New Miserable Experience
- Guy Sebastian – The Memphis Album
- Huey Lewis and the News – Soulsville
- James Taylor – Mud Slide Slim and the Blue Horizon
- Jim Dickinson – Free Beer Tomorrow, Dixie Fried
- Joe Walsh – Got Any Gum?
- Johnny Diesel and the Injectors – Johnny Diesel and the Injectors
- Led Zeppelin – Led Zeppelin III (Mixing Only)
- North Mississippi Allstars – Electric Blue Watermelon, 51 Phantom, Polaris, Shake Hands With Shorty
- R.E.M. – Green
- Stevie Ray Vaughan – Live at Carnegie Hall, The Sky is Crying
- The Afghan Whigs – Gentlemen
- The Allman Brothers – Shades of Two Worlds
- The Angels – Beyond Salvation
- The Box Tops – Cry Like a Baby
- The Raconteurs – Broken Boy Soldiers (Mixing Only)
- The Replacements – Pleased to Meet Me
- The Scruffs – Wanna Meet the Scruffs?
- The Staple Singers – The Staple Swingers
- The White Stripes – Get Behind Me Satan (Mixing Only)
- ZZ Top – Antenna, Afterburner, Eliminator, El Loco, Degüello, The Best of ZZ Top, Tejas, Fandango!, Tres Hombres, Rio Grande Mud
