= Honeycomb (album) =

Studio album by Frank Black
- Released: July 19, 2005
- Studio: Better Songs and Gardens, Nashville, Tennessee
- Genre: Americana; alternative country; Southern soul
- Length: 50:19
- Label: Back Porch (US); Cooking Vinyl (UK)
- Producer: Jon Tiven

Frank Black chronology
Frank Black Francis (2004)	Honeycomb (2005)	Fast Man Raider Man (2006)

Professional ratings
Aggregate scores
Source	Rating
Metacritic	71/100
Review scores
Source	Rating
AllMusic	3.5/5 stars
Entertainment Weekly	A
Encyclopedia of Popular Music	3/5 stars
NME	8/10
The Guardian	5/5 stars
Pitchfork	6.0/10
Popmatters	4/10 stars
Rolling Stone	3.5/5 stars
Spin	B
Uncut	4/5 stars

Honeycomb is the tenth studio album by American alternative rock musician Frank Black, released in July 2005 on Back Porch Records. His first original solo work since 1996's The Cult of Ray, Honeycomb was recorded in Nashville, and features notable local session musicians, such as Steve Cropper and ex-Presley guitarist Reggie Young.

== Background ==
Frank Black had discussed making a Black on Blonde record for about ten years with producer Jon Tiven, where he would travel to Nashville (like Dylan with Blonde on Blonde) and record with local musicians. In 2005, Black eventually found the time to record such an album. He went to Nashville and met with musicians whom Tiven had selected for the record. Black said, "I knew he'd ask all stellar people, though I had no idea it was going to be guys like Steve Cropper. They were challenged... well, more amused than challenged. I don't think it was hard for them, but they had to think a little bit."

== Covers ==
Unusually for a Frank Black album, it has 3 cover songs: "Song of the Shrimp," "Sunday Sunny Mill Valley Groove Day" (by Doug Sahm) and "Dark End of the Street". Black said that, for the cover of "Song of the Shrimp," he took his cue from the version by Townes Van Zandt, adding that he had never heard Elvis Presley's version.

== Track listing ==
All tracks are written by Frank Black, except where noted.

No.	Title	Writer(s)	Length
1.	"Selkie Bride"		3:08
2.	"I Burn Today"		4:09
3.	"Lone Child"		3:14
4.	"Another Velvet Nightmare"	Black, Reid Paley	4:36
5.	"Dark End of the Street"	Dan Penn, Chips Moman	3:56
6.	"Go Find Your Saint"		2:05
7.	"Song of the Shrimp"	Roy C. Bennett, Sid Tepper	3:10
8.	"Strange Goodbye"		2:12
9.	"Sunday Sunny Mill Valley Groove Day"	Doug Sahm	4:07
10.	"Honeycomb"		3:57
11.	"My Life Is in Storage"		3:19
12.	"Atom in My Heart"		2:46
13.	"Violet"		2:14
14.	"Sing for Joy"		5:04
Total length:			50:19

== Personnel ==
Credits adapted from the album's liner notes.

Musicians

- Frank Black – vocals, guitar
- Steve Cropper, Buddy Miller, Reggie Young – guitar
- Spooner Oldham – keyboards, bells, vocals
- David Hood – bass guitar
- Billy Block, Anton Fig, Akil Thompson, Chester Thompson – drums
- Jean Black – duet vocal (8)
- James Griffin – vocals
- Ellis Hooks – vocals
- Dan Penn – vocals
- Jon Tiven – harmonica

Technical

- Jon Tiven – producer, additional mixing
- Dann Penn – engineer, additional mixing
- Ben Mumphrey – additional engineer
- Earl Drake – mixing
- Jim DeMain – mastering
- Elizabeth Parr – cover art
- Violet Clark – package design
- Nora Hagerty – package layout
