= Tommy Hoehn =

American singer-songwriter

- Born: Thomas Forbes Hoehn Jr. November 2, 1954
- Origin: Memphis, Tennessee, United States
- Died: June 24, 2010 (aged 55)
- Genres: Rock, power pop, jangle pop
- Occupations: Musician, singer-songwriter
- Instruments: Vocals, rhythm guitar, keyboards
- Years active: 1974–2009
- Formerly of: Prix

Thomas Forbes Hoehn Jr. (November 2, 1954 – June 24, 2010) was an American singer, songwriter, keyboard player, and guitarist. Along with Jon Tiven, he led the Memphis power pop group Prix before embarking on a solo career. He also provided backing vocals on Big Star's third album, Third/Sister Lovers, and collaborated with Big Star members Alex Chilton and Chris Bell as well as Memphis power pop group The Scruffs.

Hoehn and Tiven formed Prix in 1975, not long after Hoehn had given Tiven a tape of his material. Enlisting Chris Bell as a co-producer, the group recorded numerous songs in Ardent Studios over a six-month period. While Prix garnered some major label interest, and performed at a Columbia/CBS Records showcase in New York in 1976, the group ultimately only released two contemporaneous singles, and broke up in early 1977. A compilation of eleven songs recorded by Prix, entitled Historix, would be released almost 40 years later.

Following the break up of Prix, Hoehn pursued a solo career, releasing the regional hit single Blow Yourself Up in 1977 on Power Play Records, a local Memphis label. That same year, Power Play Records released Hoehn's first solo album Spacebreak, which contained two of the songs Hoehn had recorded with Prix as well as the Blow Yourself Up single. In 1978, London Records signed Hoehn and released Spacebreak and an additional song as the album Losing You to Sleep. The album was critically well received, with both Billboard and Cashbox giving it highly positive reviews. In Christgau's Record Guide: Rock Albums of the Seventies (1981), Robert Christgau described the album as a "romantically inclined sample" of "the concentrated energy of Memphis power pop." Despite the favorable reviews, and despite promotional support, such as a full page ad in Rolling Stone, the album did not sell well.

In 1981, Hoehn released the album I Do Love The Light, which he followed up in 1983 with the EP I'm So Afraid of Girls. Following more than a decade-long hiatus, Hoehn returned to the music business in the 1990s, releasing the albums Of Moons and Fools in 1996 and The Turning Dance in 1997. He then teamed up with fellow Memphis power pop artist Van Duren, releasing three albums in the period from 1999 to 2002: Hailstone Holiday, Cows on the Fence, and Blue Orange.

In late 2009, Hoehn began work on a solo album tentatively titled Pi. However, in December 2009, Hoehn was diagnosed with cancer, and became too ill to sing lead vocals on the album. He died on June 24, 2010, at the age of 55.

== Discography ==
Prix ft. Tommy Hoehn

- Girl / Everytime I Close My Eyes / Zero (Ork Records, 1977)
- Love You Tonight (Miracle Records, 1978)
- Historix (Air Mail Records, 2002; re-released, HoZac Records, 2016)
- Ork Records: New York, New York (Numero Records, 2015)

Tommy Hoehn solo LPs

- Spacebreak – (Power Play Records, 1977) HLPP-5051
- Losing You to Sleep – (London Records, 1978) SH-U 8536
- I Do Love the Light – (Power Play Records, 1981) HLPP-5052
- Of Moons and Fools - (Frankenstein Records, 1996) FR0069
- The Turning Dance – (Frankenstein Records, 1997) FR0071
- Losing You to Sleep (expanded edition) (Air Mail Records CD, 2006)
- Losing You to Sleep (expanded edition) (Milk & Soda Records digital download, 2010)

Tommy Hoehn solo singles and EPs

- Blow Yourself Up – (Power Play Records 7" single, 1977) PP1954
- I'm So Afraid of Girls – (Race Records EP, 1983) RR383

Tommy Hoehn with Van Duren

- Hailstone Holiday – (Frankenstein Records, 1999) FR-1124
- Blue Orange – (Frankenstein Records, 2002) FR-1210

Appeared on

- Big Star, Third/Sister Lovers (PVC, 1978) – backing vocals
- Alex Chilton, Singer Not the Song (EP) – (Ork Records, 1977) - backing vocals, keyboards
- Alex Chilton, Bach's Bottom – (Line, 1980) - backing vocals, keyboards
- The Scruffs – Angst: The Early Recordings 1974 - 1976 – (Northern Heights, 1998) – backing vocals
