= The Scruffs =

American band

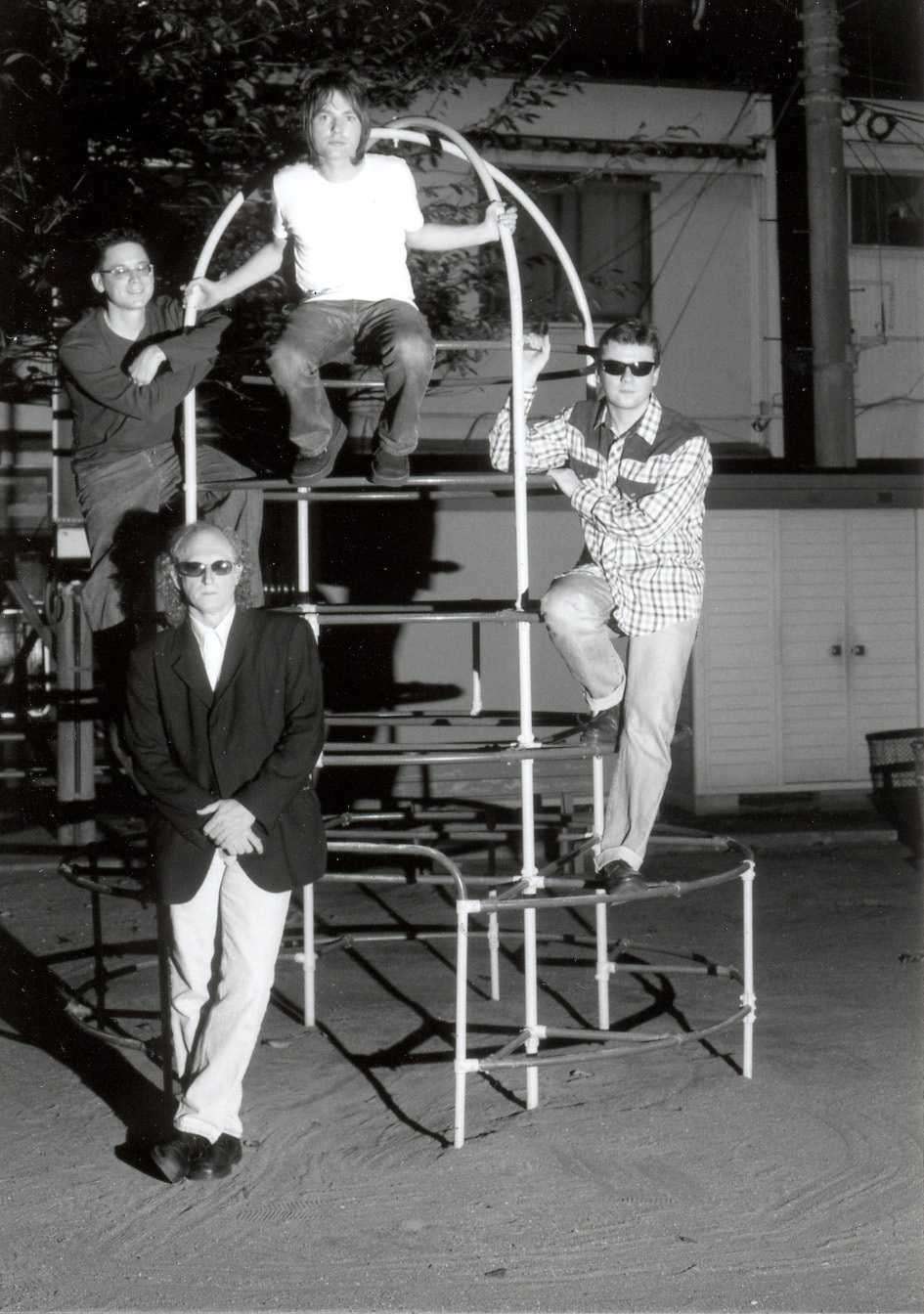
- Scruffs in 2001, Japanese tour Photo: Masao Nakagami

Background information
- Origin: Memphis, Tennessee, U.S.
- Genre: Power pop
- Years active: 1974–present
- Label: Verve
- Members: Stephen Burns, Adam Hill, Bobby Kildea, Mark Rodgers
- Past members: David Branyan, Zeph Paulson, Rick Branyan, Tommy Hoehn, Bill Mathieu, Bill Godley, Steve O'Rourke, Alex Chilton, Stevie Jackson, Stuart Murdoch, Zachary Ware, Francis MacDonald, Wil O’Brien

The Scruffs are an American power pop group formed in Memphis, Tennessee in 1974 by writer/guitarist/vocalist Stephen Burns along with guitarist David Branyan, bassist Rick Branyan, and drummer Zeph Paulson. Although their line-up has changed many times over the years, The Scruffs, centered around Burns, have continued to release records up through the 2010s.

== History ==
=== Formation and early years (1974–1976) ===
Formed in 1974 by singer/songwriter and guitarist Stephen Burns, who would cut classes at the University of Memphis to rehearse and record, the group spent a two-year period in which it would write music and rehearse in a warehouse at Shoe Studio and then record at Ardent Studios when it had enough songs. Rick Branyan left the band in 1976, and Andy Tanus, Ken Woodley, and Van Duren were brought into the studio to play bass, with Bill Godley ultimately filling the role until Branyan's return a year later. Burns' high school friend, Tommy Hoehn, who led the power pop group Prix, was brought in for backing vocals.

During this period, the band recorded many of the songs (most penned by Burns or Burns co-writing with David Branyan) that would later appear on its first album. The songs from this period were collected and released more than twenty years later on the anthology Angst: The Early Recordings 1974-1976. Big Star producer Jim Dickinson, who was working on Big Star's Third/Sister Lovers at Ardent when The Scruffs began recording there, and who heard The Scruffs' demos in their earliest stages, recalled that people on the local scene expected The Scruffs to take the radio by storm. Dickinson said of these early recordings, "If there's going to be a Scruffs history, that's it . . . . It really does represent, if not the end, then the beginning of the end of something in Memphis music. After that, nobody even tried to do that again."

=== Wanna Meet the Scruffs? and initial breakup ===
In early 1977, the Scruffs released their first single, "Break the Ice," on Power Play records. The record received local airplay in Memphis. The Scruffs then returned to Ardent to re-record a selection of their material and, later in 1977, released the new recordings as their first LP, Wanna Meet the Scruffs?.

Those critics who heard the album were unanimous in their praise. Village Voice rock critic Robert Christgau wrote:

Only a sucker for rock and roll could love this record, and I am that sucker. A middle-period Beatles extrapolation in the manner of Big Star (another out-of-step Memphis power-pop group on a small, out-of-step Memphis label), it bursts with off harmonies, left hooks, and jolts of random energy. The trouble is, these serve a shamelessly and perhaps permanently post-adolescent vision of life's pain, most of which would appear to involve gurls. To which objection the rockin' formalist in me responds, "I wanna hear 'Revenge' again."

The album, however, received only local airplay and little more. In August 1978, the group began recording a follow-up album. After completing six songs, the band moved to New York City and played at CBGB and Max's Kansas City. In 1979, Rick Branyan moved back to Memphis, and was replaced by Steve Wood. Several months later, Dave Branyan quit mid-performance and was replaced by a local guitarist, Steve O'Rourke. In October 1979, the group recorded the rest of the follow-up album at Ardent Studios in Memphis. Returning to New York, the band opened for acts as disparate as Chuck Berry, Johnny Thunders, and Peter Noone.

Although they received major label interest, they were unable to secure a record deal for their second album. That album, Teenage Gurls, would finally be released almost twenty years later. As one critic would write of the album, "the band is in great form throughout, sounding tighter and fuller than on the debut, and there are more than a few excellent songs here, especially 'Alice, Please Don't Go,' 'Danger,' and 'Go Faster.'"

By 1981, having only released the single Shakin’ from the album, the group disbanded.

=== 1980s ===
After the group's initial break-up, many of the members pursued other careers. Rick Branyan became a Latin teacher at a local private high school in Memphis. David Branyan pursued a solo career recording again at Ardent Studios, before attending Columbia and Yale universities.

Burns returned to Memphis from New York in 1982, and continued to record sporadically as The Scruffs with various musicians throughout the rest of the 1980s while finishing his liberal arts degree at the University of Memphis and obtaining a second degree in business and accounting. These recordings were eventually released as The Scruffs' third album, MidTown. Noting the influence of Memphis's seminal power pop group, Robert Christgau wrote of the album, "it's Memphis, it's the '80s, and darn it, Big Star lives ('Machiavellian Eyes,' 'Judy [She Put the Devil in Me]')."

=== 1990s–2000s ===
Burns took a hiatus from recording, during which time he worked in his father's insurance business and married and divorced. Burns then regrouped with a new lineup of musicians and, in 1997, released the album Signs & Symbols under the group name "Messenger 45." The album was re-released with a different track order in 2013 as The Scruffs' album Back from the Grave, and is considered the group's fourth studio album chronologically. Writing in AllMusic, critic Mark Deming observed that the album "marked a creative departure for Burns," finding him "writing lusher and more complex music . . . . But Burns' fondness for British-influenced pop hasn't left him, and if [the album] is a very different kettle of fish from the classic Wanna Meet the Scruffs?, it suggests that he still believes a nice melody and a good hook are the keys to the universe -- and who knows, he may well be right."

In the late 1990s, Big Star co-founder Alex Chilton convinced Burns to follow him to Glasgow, Scotland, where Big Star and The Scruffs themselves had been proclaimed a major influence by Scottish bands constituting what the press had dubbed "The Bellshill Sound." Burns reformed The Scruffs in Glasgow with local musicians Bobby Kildea, Stevie Jackson and Stuart Murdoch of Belle and Sebastian renown, Zachary Ware, guitarist with The Proclaimers, Francis MacDonald of Teenage Fanclub and BMX Bandits fame, and Wil O’Brien, guitarist for Los Angeles-based power pop bands The Andersons!, and Receiver. The group began recording at CaVa Studios in Glasgow. The new material was mixed at Ardent in Memphis. It was released in 2002 as The Scruffs' fifth album, Love, The Scruffs, initially only in Japan, where The Scruffs enjoyed a loyal following. Two tours in Japan followed over the next two years.

In 2003, The Scruffs released their sixth album, Swingin' Singles. Although now principally living back in the United States, Burns continued to work in, variously, Glasgow and Edinburgh as well as Memphis. Although The Scruffs primarily toured in Europe and Japan, the group played its first concert in Memphis in over 20 years in 2006 while working on a new album at Ardent.

At the end of 2006, The Scruffs released their seventh album, Pop Manifesto, to many favorable reviews. One critic wrote that "Burns is still writing terrific songs with glorious melodies and superb hooks, which is the real link between this music and his past," calling the album "a fine and well-crafted visit to smart pop heaven that proves Stephen Burns isn't running out of interesting ideas." David Bash, CEO of International Pop Overthrow annual music festivals, ranked the album at number 5 on his top 125 albums of 2007 list.

=== 2010s–present ===
In 2009, The Scruffs began recording songs for their eighth studio album, first in Glasgow and later in Memphis. Conquest was released in January 2010 to, once more, many favorable reviews. In his AllMusic review, critic William Ruhlman wrote that "Burns retains his talent for catchy melodies and his lyrical fascination with young women . . . while as a record-maker he evokes mid-‘60s Beach Boys and Beatles, along with mid-‘70s Electric Light Orchestra."

Encouraged by the response to Conquest, The Scruffs reconvened in Edinburgh in early 2010 to commence rehearsals for another album, recording the material at Ardent in November 2010. The Scruffs' principal line-up for these recordings was Burns (guitar, vocals, producer), Adam Hill (guitars, backing vocals, additional bass), Bobby Kildea (bass, backing vocals, percussion) and Mark Rodgers (drums, percussion), with the Vest Brothers (also from Memphis) providing backing vocals and guitar. Peter Buck of R.E.M. also made a guest appearance on one song.

Mastered at Abbey Road Studios in London, England, Kill! Kill!, The Scruffs' ninth studio album, was released in February 2011. One critic described it as "a McCartney-esque pop tour de force that sounds fresh and surprisingly fierce coming from a band in its 36th year of existence," stating that it showed why Burns "might be the most vital remaining member of the now somewhat legendary Memphis power-pop scene of the 1970s."

== Discography ==
=== Studio albums ===
- Wanna Meet the Scruffs? – (Power Play Records, 1977) HLPP-5050
- TeenAge Gurls – (recorded 1978–1979; Northern Heights Records, 1998) NHM-40214
- MidTown – (recorded 1982–1989; Northern Heights Records, 1998) NHM-40216
- Back from the Grave – (Northern Heights Records, 1997) NHM-40220
- Love, The Scruffs – (Nippon Crown Co., Ltd. Records, 2002) CRCL-4568; (Smash Records, 2003) SR1415
- Swingin' Singles – (Smash Records, 2003) SR1413
- Pop Manifesto – (Scruffsville Records, 2006) 5240130
- Conquest – (Scruffsville Records, 2010)
- Kill! Kill! – (Scruffsville Records, 2011) ARD8524

=== Singles ===
- Break the Ice / She Say Yea – (Power Play Records, 1977) PP 1955
- Shakin’ / Teenage Girls – (Power Play Records, 1978) PP 1957

=== Compilation albums ===
- Angst: The Early Recordings 1974-1976 – (Northern Heights Records, 1998) NHM-40210
