= Susan Beschta =

American punk rocker, lawyer and judge

Susan Springfield
- Performing at CBGB in 1978
- Born: Susan Marie Beschta; April 21, 1952; Appleton, Wisconsin, U.S.
- Died: May 2, 2019 (aged 67)
- Other names: Susan Springfield; Susan Beschta-Springfield
- Occupations: Artist; singer; lawyer
- Years active: 1970–80s (art/music); 1990–2019 (law)
- Children: Thando Marshall; Vuyisile Jamal; Layla Marie
- Musical career
- Genres: Punk rock
- Instruments: Vocals; guitar

Susan Marie Beschta (April 21, 1952 – May 2, 2019), who performed as Susan Springfield, was the founder and lead singer of Erasers, a band that headlined at CBGB in the 1970s.

She became a solo artist in the 1980s and then trained as a lawyer to start a new career. After graduating from the CUNY School of Law, she fought human rights cases for Catholic Charities. She was sworn in as a federal judge in 2018.

== Early life and education ==
She was born Susan Marie Beschta on April 21, 1952, in Appleton, Wisconsin – one of five children of a Catholic couple, Gerald and Jean Beschta. The culture was traditional and her father was keen on sports but, while she was fond of the place, she chose a different path. After college at University of Wisconsin–Whitewater, she went to the hippy scene of California and then hitch-hiked across the country to study fine arts at the Pratt Institute in Brooklyn where she hoped to become a painter.

== Art and music ==
Beschta was able to stay rent-free at the Fine Arts Building at 232 East 59th Street in return for looking after its photo gallery. She shared a loft with Jane Fire and they formed Erasers, a punk-rock band, in 1974, with Fire on drums and Beschta as the singer/songwriter and guitarist. Several musicians such as Richie Lure and Anton Fig tried out with the band and the most lasting were Jody Beach on bass guitar and David Ebony, a classically trained musician. The band practised in the basement of a deli near the Fine Arts Building and they played some impromptu gigs in the street there. They performed at venues including The Great Gildersleeve's and, most especially, CBGB, which was a famous proving ground for punk rock bands. Their style was enthusiastic, feminist and non-commercial. They attracted some favourable reviews but did not sign with a record label.

Beschta was influential in the social scene of punk rock, entertaining stars like Johnny Rotten and Iggy Pop and dating Richard Hell. In 1978, she starred with Debbie Harry in Amos Poe's movie The Foreigner. After the Erasers, she performed in other bands and artistic projects including the Susan Springfield Band, Desire and Civilization and the Landscape of Discontent.

== Legal career ==
In the 1980s she trained as a lawyer to start a new career. After graduating from the CUNY School of Law, she fought human rights cases for Catholic Charities. In 2002, she joined the Department of Homeland Security to handle immigration cases in New York while still volunteering for causes including ACT UP and Code Pink. In 2018, she was sworn in as an immigration judge.

== Death ==
Beschta died on May 2, 2019, at the age of 67 in hospice care in Manhattan, New York City, of brain cancer.
