= Van Duren (musician) =

American singer-songwriter

Van Duren is an American singer-songwriter who released a successful debut album in 1978 to critical acclaim. He has subsequently recorded and released more than 15 additional albums. Van's career was revitalized in 2019 after the release of a film about his journey, Waiting – the Van Duren Story.

== Career ==
=== Early career ===
Born 25 August 1953 in Memphis, Tennessee, Van Duren was part of the Memphis music scene along with power-pop group Big Star. Van befriended the group's eventual drummer Jody Stephens in 1970 when Stephens was working with Chris Bell and Andy Hummel in Icewater, the precursor to Big Star. In 1974, he auditioned to replace vocalist and guitarist Chris Bell in Big Star. "It went horribly, basically because I was a bassist at the time" he recalled later, and he didn't get the spot. In 1975-76, Van played in a post Big Star band called the Baker Street Regulars with Bell and Stephens.

=== New York ===
In 1977, he moved to New York's Greenwich Village and began work on a solo album. He was managed and produced by Andrew Loog Oldman of Rolling Stones fame, and had been drawing comparisons to Paul McCartney. He released his first album Are You Serious? in 1978 on the Big Sound label, which received rave reviews and was widely played on US radio stations. It was released in Europe as Staring at the Ceiling on the London Decca label. It included one song, The Love That I Love, co-written by Big Star's Jody Stephens.

In 1980, he had recorded his second album, Idiot Optimism, but his relationship with Big Sound's owner, Doc Cavalier, had soured due to a conflict over Scientology. As a result, the label did not distribute the album, while retaining the rights.

=== Return to Memphis ===
In 1981, he returned to Memphis after "things just ran out of steam and gigs dried up".

In 1982, he helped form a band, Good Question. He wrote all the songs on the 1986 release Thin Disguise except "Girls In Uniform" co-written by John Hampton. Good Question had limited success with the single "Jane" and didn't make any more albums but continued to perform until the late '90's.

In 1998, he teamed up with fellow Memphis musician Tommy Hoehn to co-write an album, released as Hailstone Holiday on Frankenstein Records in 1999.

Also in 1999, the album Idiot Optimism was finally released, in Japan on Airmail Recordings and with minimal input from Van Duren who was recovering from a major stroke. In 2020, he released a remastered version on Omnivore Recordings along with a remastered version of Are You Serious?, both on vinyl.

=== Partnership with Vicki Loveland ===
Meanwhile, Van formed a musical partnership with the singer/songwriter/percussionist Vicki Loveland in 2012, recording 3 albums of material co-written by the duo: Bloody Cupid (2013), NEXT (2016) and Any Such Thing (2021) all on the Edgewood Recordings label.

In 2019, he became the subject of the documentary Waiting: The Story of Van Duren, made by two Australian first-time film-makers. This triggered the re-release of some earlier albums (see above) and a soundtrack album from the film, also on Omnivore.

In 2023, a set recorded live in Memphis in 1992 with Good Question was released, under the name Cartwheeling: Live in Memphis. Recorded and mixed at 315 Beale St Studios by Rusty McFarland with a live audience in the studio and with no overdubs, it features Van on lead vocals, guitars and piano; Ray Sanders on vocals, bass: James Lott on vocals, guitar: Joel Williams on drums, vocals; and Rick Steff on keyboards, accordion.

2024 finds Van still performing live regularly in his hometown of Memphis at age 70.

== Discography ==
- Are You Serious? (Big Sound, 1978) / Staring At the Ceiling (London/Decca)
- Idiot Optimism (recorded 1978–1979, released 1999 Airmail Recordings, Japan)
- Thin Disguise (SUR Records 1986), reissued 2001 Airmail Recordings, Japan)
- Hailstone Holiday—Hoehn Duren (w/Tommy Hoehn) (recorded 1998–99 released 1999 Frankenstein Records, reissued 2001 Airmail Recordings, Japan)
- Blue Orange--Hoehn Duren (w/Tommy Hoehn) recorded 2001–02 released 2002 Frankenstein Records, reissued 2003 Airmail Recordings, Japan
- Open Secret (Van Duren 3rd solo album) recorded 2003–05, released 2005 Pure Pop Planet Recordings
- Resonance Road (2010) (Van Duren 4th solo album) recorded 2005–10, released by Three Cool Cats Records
- Her Name Comes Up (Van Duren and Tim Horrigan, 2012) recorded 1990–1996, released 2012
- Bloody Cupid (Loveland Duren) recorded and released 2013 Edgewood Recordings
- NEXT (Loveland Duren) recorded 2015–16, released 2016 Edgewood Recordings
- Any Such Thing (Loveland Duren) recorded 2020–21, released 2021 Edgewood Recordings
- Waiting: The Van Duren Story film soundtrack (2019 Omnivore Recordings)
- Are You Serious? (re-mastered, 2020 Omnivore Recordings)
- Idiot Optimism (re-mastered, 2020 Omnivore Recordings)
- Cartwheeling: Live in Memphis 1992 (Van Duren and Good Question, 2023 Omnivore Recordings)
