= Armed and Dangerous (EP) =

EP by Anthrax
- Released: February 1985
- Recorded: 1984
- Studio: Pyramid (Ithaca, New York)
- Genres: Thrash metal; speed metal
- Length: 27:02
- Label: Megaforce
- Producers: Anthrax; Carl Canedy; Jon Zazula

Anthrax chronology
Fistful of Metal (1984)	Armed and Dangerous (1985)	Spreading the Disease (1985)

Professional ratings
Review scores
Source	Rating
AllMusic	3/5 stars
Collector's Guide to Heavy Metal	6/10
The New Rolling Stone Album Guide	3/5 stars

Armed and Dangerous is the debut EP by the American heavy metal band Anthrax, released in February 1985 through Megaforce Records. The band produced it with Carl Canedy and Jon Zazula, who is also the executive producer. This is the first Anthrax release to feature Joey Belladonna on vocals, and Frank Bello on bass guitar.

The 1992 reissue includes the songs "Soldiers of Metal" and "Howling Furies" as its last two tracks. The line-up for those two tracks is Neil Turbin, Scott Ian, Dan Spitz, Greg D'Angelo (except where Charlie Benante rerecorded the drums), and Dan Lilker. It was released as a double album (along with Fistful of Metal) in (Germany) in 2000.

The song "Armed and Dangerous" also appears on the album Spreading the Disease with a different mix, which does not include the fade-in intro leading into the initial acoustic guitar melody. That intro was omitted from the album version for unverified reasons but it is possible that it was for album continuity.

The song "Raise Hell" was an original Anthrax recording exclusive to the EP, and "God Save the Queen" was originally recorded by the Sex Pistols on the Never Mind the Bollocks, Here's the Sex Pistols album. Despite being marked as live versions, "Metal Thrashing Mad" and "Panic" are studio re-recordings of tracks featured on the band's debut album.

== Track listing ==
No.	Title	Writer(s)	Length
1.	"Armed and Dangerous" (special pre-release version)	Neil Turbin, Joey Belladonna, Dan Spitz, Scott Ian, Danny Lilker, Frank Bello, Charlie Benante	6:07
2.	"Raise Hell"	Turbin, Spitz, Ian, Bello, Benante	4:03
3.	"God Save the Queen" (Sex Pistols cover)	Johnny Rotten, Steve Jones, Glen Matlock, Paul Cook	3:02
4.	"Metal Thrashing Mad" (live)	Turbin, Spitz, Ian, Lilker, Benante	2:51
5.	"Panic" (live)	Turbin, Ian, Lilker	3:45
Total length:			19:48

1992 reissue bonus tracks
No.	Title	Writer(s)	Length
6.	"Soldiers of Metal" (from the first Anthrax single, unavailable since 1983)	Turbin, Ian, Lilker	3:07
7.	"Howling Furies" (from the first Anthrax single, unavailable since 1983)	Ian, Lilker	4:07
Total length:			27:02

== Personnel ==
Band members

- Joey Belladonna – vocals
- Dan Spitz – lead guitar
- Scott Ian – rhythm guitar
- Frank Bello – bass
- Charlie Benante – drums

Additional musicians

- Neil Turbin – vocals on "Soldiers of Metal" and "Howling Furies"
- Dan Lilker – bass on "Soldiers of Metal" and "Howling Furies"
- Greg D'Angelo – drums on "Howling Furies"

Production

- Carl Canedy – producer
- Alex Perialas – Norman Dunn – engineers
- George Marino – mastering
- Jon Zazula – executive producer
