= Paley & Francis =

2011 studio album by Paley & Francis

Studio album by Paley & Francis (Black Francis and Reid Paley)
- Released: October 11, 2011
- Recorded: September 2010
- Studio: Hormone Studios, Nashville
- Genre: Rock, roots rock, alternative rock
- Length: 35:59
- Label: Cooking Vinyl, Sonic Unyon, Demon Music Group
- Producer: Jon Tiven

Black Francis chronology
Abbabubba (2011)	Paley & Francis (2011)

Professional ratings
Aggregate scores
Source	Rating
Metacritic	60/100
Review scores
Source	Rating
Allmusic	3.5/5 stars
Consequence of Sound	C−
Popmatters	6/10 stars
Uncut	2/5 stars
Under the Radar	5/10

Paley & Francis is a studio album by Paley & Francis (Reid Paley and Black Francis), recorded in Nashville in September 2010, and released in the UK & Europe on October 10, 2011 on Cooking Vinyl, and in North America on October 11, 2011 on Sonic Unyon.

The album was produced by Jon Tiven, and features Reid Paley and Black Francis on guitars and vocals, accompanied by Muscle Shoals legends Spooner Oldham on piano and David Hood on bass.

Paley & Francis debuted live in early September 2011 with club performances in Albany NY, Buffalo NY, and Hamilton Ontario (unannounced), and as one of the headliners of Hamilton Ontario's Supercrawl Festival. The band for these performances consisted of Reid Paley & Black Francis on guitars and vocals, Eric Eble (of the Reid Paley Trio) on bass, and Dave Varriale on drums.

The Paley & Francis album was re-released as a vinyl LP in 2022 by Demon Music Group.

== Track listing ==
All music written by Black Francis and Reid Paley, lyricists noted below

1. "Curse" (Francis) – 3:45
2. "On the Corner" (Paley) – 2:18
3. "Magic Cup" (Francis) – 3:47
4. "Ugly Life" (Paley) – 3:55
5. "Seal" (Francis) – 4:29
6. "The Last Song" (Paley) – 3:38
7. "Crescent Moon" (Francis) – 3:26
8. "Deconstructed" (Paley) – 3:44
9. "Praise" (Francis) – 3:36
10. "Happy Shoes" (Paley) – 3:22

== Personnel ==
Credits adapted from the album's liner notes.

Musicians

- Reid Paley – lead and backing vocals, electric guitar
- Black Francis – lead and backing vocals, acoustic and electric guitar
- David Hood – bass
- Spooner Oldham – piano, organ, electric piano
- Harry Stinson – snare, tambourine, shaker, bells
- Jon Tiven – tenor saxophone, harmonica, tambourine, "bass pillow", snare, handclaps, backing vocals
- Jru Frazier – snare, tambourine
- Patterson Hood – shaker

Technical

- Jon Tiven – producer, engineer, mixing
- Jake Burns – mixing engineer
- Jim Demain – mastering engineer
- Myles Mangino – photography
- Butch Belair – photography
