= Reid Paley =

American singer-songwriter

- Origin: Brooklyn, New York, United States
- Occupations: Singer, songwriter, musician
- Instruments: Vocals, guitar
- Years active: 1980–present
- Labels: Sub Pop, Metaphor Rhythms, eMusic, GoodNoise, XXS Records, Sonic Unyon, Cooking Vinyl, Demon Music Group
- Formerly of: The Five
- Website: http://reidpaley.com/

Reid Paley is an American singer, songwriter and musician. He has been performing and recording both solo and with his trio since the mid-1990s.

== Early career ==
In the 1980s, Paley was singer, front man, and writer for post-punk band The Five, which he founded in Pittsburgh, Pennsylvania. In the first year of the band's existence The Five released limited pressings of a vinyl single "Napalm Beach" backed with "Excite Me" and the EP "Act of Contrition." The band later moved to Boston and spent several years headlining clubs before breaking up in the late 1980s. A vinyl LP entitled THE FIVE (produced by Lou Giordano) was released after the band broke up.

== Solo work / Reid Paley Trio ==
Returning to Brooklyn in the early 1990s, Paley continued writing and began performing solo in rock clubs on the Lower East Side, singing his songs and playing a 1955 Gretsch archtop guitar plugged into a 1965 Fender Super Reverb amplifier.

After a series of self-released cassette tapes available only at shows, Sub Pop released his solo debut, the vinyl single "Time For You" b/w "The Best Of All". Paley's first solo album Lucky's Tune was produced by Frank Black (Black Francis), and released by GoodNoise in 1999. This was followed in 2000 by the album Revival, featuring Paley accompanied by Robert Lee Oliver on the three-string bass and James Murray on the trap kit, and produced by Eric Drew Feldman, who along with Jim Duffy also guests on the album. The album was released by eMusic, and is the first recorded appearance of the Reid Paley Trio.

Throughout the late 1990s and early 2000s, Paley played across the US and Western Europe, including numerous tours as support for Frank Black. Paley and Black have also collaborated on the writing of songs. some of which appear on the Frank Black albums Honeycomb, including "Another Velvet Nightmare"), Fast Man Raider Man ("I'm Not Dead (I'm in Pittsburgh)", "Golden Shore", "Dog Sleep", "Down To You"), and Christmass ("Don't Get Me Wrong"). A Frank Black & the Catholics recording of Paley's "Take What You Want" appears on their limited edition EP Everything Is New.

Paley toured the UK in 2004 and 2006, and has played various festivals including the Vienna Festival (Wiener Festwochen/Into The City) in Austria (with Eric Drew Feldman sitting in on keys) in 2007, and the Blues Rules Festival in Crissier, Switzerland in May 2010 (with Jerome O'Brien sitting in on upright bass).

In 2007 the album Approximate Hellhound vs The Monkey Demon was released by Metaphor Rhythms. It was produced by Paley and, like all his previous releases, was recorded on analog tape. On this album he was accompanied by Eric Eble on Czechoslovak upright bass and James Murray on the trap kit. As of 2024, this remains the lineup of the Reid Paley Trio.

Paley's first solo album Lucky's Tune was re-released as a limited edition vinyl LP by Demon Music Group in July 2022.

Reid Paley lives in Brooklyn, New York.

== Paley & Francis ==
In the fall of 2010 in Nashville, Reid Paley and Black Francis/Frank Black recorded an album of new songwriting collaborations, appearing under the moniker Paley & Francis.

The Paley & Francis album (also titled Paley & Francis) was produced by Jon Tiven, and features Reid Paley and Black Francis on guitars and vocals, accompanied by Spooner Oldham on piano and David Hood on bass. The album was released in October 2011 on Sonic Unyon in North America, and on Cooking Vinyl in the UK and Europe.

Paley & Francis debuted live in early September 2011 with club performances in Albany NY, Buffalo NY, and Hamilton Ontario (unannounced), and as one of the headliners of Hamilton Ontario's Supercrawl Festival. The band for these performances consisted of Reid Paley & Black Francis on guitars and vocals, Eric Eble (of the Reid Paley Trio) on bass, and Dave Varriale on drums.

The Paley & Francis album was re-released as a limited edition vinyl LP by Demon Music Group. in January 2022.

== Discography ==
Reid Paley

- Time For You / The Best Of All, Sub Pop vinyl single, 1997 (Produced by James Murray)
- Lucky's Tune, LP, 1999 (Produced by Frank Black a.k.a. Black Francis, released by GoodNoise)
- Revival, LP, 2000 (Produced by Eric Drew Feldman, released by eMusic)
- Revival, LP, 2001 (Produced by Eric Drew Feldman, released by German label XXS Records, with 4 songs from Lucky's Tune as bonus tracks)
- Approximate Hellhound vs The Monkey Demon, LP, 2007 (Produced by Reid Paley, released by Metaphor Rhythms)
- Lucky's Tune, vinyl LP, 2022 (Produced Frank Black a.k.a. Black Francis, re-released by Demon Music Group)

Paley & Francis

- Paley & Francis, LP, 2011 – Collaboration with Black Francis (Produced by Jon Tiven, released by Sonic Unyon in the North America, and Cooking Vinyl in the UK & Europe)
- Paley & Francis, vinyl LP, 2022, (Produced by Jon Tiven, re-released by Demon Music Group)

The Five

- The Five, vinyl LP, 1989 (Produced by Lou Giordano, released by BEM Records)
