= Sunday Sunny Mill Valley Groove Day =

Studio album by Frank Black & the Catholics
- Released: 2000
- Studio: The Studio That Time Forgot, San Francisco, California
- Genre: Alt-country
- Length: 32:44
- Producer: Eric Drew Feldman

Frank Black & the Catholics chronology
Pistolero (1999)	Sunday Sunny Mill Valley Groove Day (2000)	Oddballs (2000)

Sunday Sunny Mill Valley Groove Day is an album by Frank Black and the Catholics, recorded in 2000. Because Black was not completely happy with the recording sessions, he decided against a commercial release. However, he did hand out several copies of the album at shows, which fans uploaded to the internet. Several tracks were later used as B-sides or rerecorded for the albums Devil's Workshop (2002), Black Letter Days (2002) and Honeycomb (2005).

In 2015, many (though not all) of the tracks were included on the Frank Black and the Catholics: The Complete Recordings box set.

== Background ==
Frank Black told Magnet magazine in 2002: "We made a record that ended up on the Internet called Sunday Mill Valley Groove Day, and it was just an OK session but in general it was not an album, so we didn’t release it as an album. I had a few copies of it in my pocket and I was on tour and a couple of super-excited kids who seemed like they deserved something special happened to be there and I said, "Here you go," and they posted it, like, the next day. I didn't ask my audience to buy it. It's a freebie, I'm not going to sell it."

== Track listing ==
All tracks are written by Frank Black, except where noted.

No.	Title	Writer(s)	Length
1.	"Constant Sorrow Man"		3:38
2.	"Pan American Highway"		4:16
3.	"Sunday Sunny Mill Valley Groove Day"	Doug Sahm	5:10
4.	"Humboldt County Massacre"		2:35
5.	"Angst"		1:35
6.	"Sleep"	Donovan Leitch	2:39
7.	"Sister Isabel"	Del Shannon, Brian Hyland	3:26
8.	"Le Cigare Volant"		2:25
9.	"I Will Run After You"		3:51
10.	"His Kingly Cave"		3:09

== Personnel ==
Credits adapted from frankblack.net.

Frank Black and the Catholics

- Frank Black – vocals, guitar
- Rich Gilbert – guitar, pedal steel guitar, vocals
- Eric Drew Feldman – piano, organ, electric piano, keyboards
- David McCaffery – bass, vocals
- Scott Boutier – drums

Technical

- Eric Drew Feldman – producer
- Kevin Ink – recording engineer
