= Ork Records: New York, New York =

Compilation album by Various artists
- Released: October 30, 2015
- Genre: Rock, Punk
- Length: 2:34:40
- Label: Numero

Professional ratings
Aggregate scores
Source	Rating
Metacritic	90/100
Review scores
Source	Rating
AllMusic	4.5/5 stars

Ork Records: New York, New York is a 2CD/4LP compilation album from punk bands associated with Ork Records in the 1970s. It was released in October 2015 under Numero Group.

== Track listing ==
Disc one
No.	Title	Artist	Length
1.	"Little Johnny Jewel"	Television	7:05
2.	"Fa C.-La"	The Feelies	2:52
3.	"(I Belong to The) Blank Generation"	Richard Hell	2:54
4.	"The Way (You Touch My Hand)"	The Revelons	3:06
5.	"I Won’t Give Up"	Erasers	4:02
6.	"All of the Time"	Alex Chilton	2:35
7.	"(I Thought) You Wanted to Know"	Chris Stamey & The dB's	3:22
8.	"Zero"	Prix	3:46
9.	"Red Lights"	Marbles	3:01
10.	"Take Me Home and Make Me Like It"	Alex Chilton	2:32
11.	"Girl"	Prix	2:46
12.	"Girl That I Love"	The Idols	3:51
13.	"Lost Johnny"	Mick Farren	3:29
14.	"Still Wanna Die"	Cheetah Chrome	2:10
15.	"You"	The Idols	3:16
16.	"Christmas Weather"	Student Teachers	2:48
17.	"It Was So Funny (The Song That They Sung)"	Erasers	3:38
18.	"(I Could Live With You) (In) Another World"	Richard Hell	6:07
19.	"The Summer Sun"	Chris Stamey	3:06
20.	"Free Again"	Alex Chilton	2:22
21.	"(I Thought) You Wanted to Know"	Richard Lloyd	3:48
22.	"Channel 13"	Student Teachers	2:13
23.	"Where the Fun Is"	Chris Stamey	3:09
24.	"Everytime I Close My Eyes"	Prix	1:45

Disc two
No.	Title	Artist	Length
1.	"Forces at Work"	The Feelies	3:31
2.	"Fire and Smoke"	Marbles	3:15
3.	"97 Tears"	The Revelons	3:28
4.	"Take Me Home"	Cheetah Chrome	2:53
5.	"You Gotta Lose"	Richard Hell, Chris Stamey & The dB's	3:31
6.	"If and When"	Mick Farren, Chris Stamey & The dB's	2:30
7.	"Play With Fire"	Mick Farren	3:33
8.	"The Get Off of My Cloud"	Richard Lloyd	2:59
9.	"The Singer Not the Song"	Alex Chilton	2:03
10.	"Connection"	Richard Lloyd	3:13
11.	"Summertime Blues"	Alex Chilton	2:34
12.	"To Know Him Is to Love Him"	Mick Farren	1:28
13.	"Crazy Like a Fox"	Link Cromwell	2:20
14.	"Shock Me"	Link Cromwell	1:58
15.	"I Wanna Be the King"	Kenneth Higney	3:06
16.	"Let It Blurt"	Lester Bangs	3:35
17.	"Bangkok"	Alex Chilton	2:00
18.	"Big Black Truck"	Peter Holsapple	2:44
19.	"She Might Look My Way"	Prix	2:25
20.	"Can't Seem to Make You Mine"	Alex Chilton	2:44
21.	"Love You All Day Long"	Prix	3:05
22.	"Shakin' the World"	Alex Chilton	3:03
23.	"Love You Tonight"	Prix	3:32
24.	"Live"	Lester Bangs	3:50
25.	"Funky Kinky"	Kenneth Higney	5:37

The 4LP version divided the sides as:
A: 1-1 - 1-5; B: 1-6 - 1-12; C: 1-13 - 1-18; D: 1-19 - 1-24;
E: 2-1 - 2-6; F: 2-7 - 2-14; G: 2-15 - 2-20; H: 2-21 - 2-25.
Editions of 2000 CD boxes and 2000 LP boxes included a 190-page hardcover book, and a bonus Feelies 7" in a numbered sleeve, with the songs "The Boy with Perpetual Nervousness," recorded in the studio, and a cover of Manfred Mann's "My Little Red Book," recorded live at CBGB on December 14, 1977.
