= Threatcon Delta =

Studio album by Neil Turbin
- Released: January 16, 2003
- Genres: Heavy metal, speed metal
- Length: 32:51
- Label: Metal Mayhem
- Producer: Neil Turbin

Threatcon Delta is the debut studio album by American heavy metal vocalist Neil Turbin. The album was released in 2003 on Metal Mayhem Records, and contains eleven original tracks and three bonus tracks.

Threatcon Delta has been described as "true heavy metal" and "a definite throwback to the 80s thrash era" by some reviewers.

== Track listing ==
No.	Title	Writer(s)	Length
1.	"Wake Up Call"	Neil Turbin	0:24
2.	"Cut to the Chase"		2:51
3.	"What You Can't Control"		3:28
4.	"Sick Of It All"		3:04
5.	"Keep The Fire"		3:52
6.	"The Truth is The Best Lie"		3:49
7.	"Blue Screen of Death"		3:03
8.	"Rat Race"		3:33
9.	"Vigilante Justice"		2:50
10.	"Dog Eat Everything"		2:42
11.	"Piece of Me"		3:15
Total length:			32:51

Bonus tracks
No.	Title	Length
1.	"Dolly Dagger" (Jimi Hendrix cover)	3:40
2.	"Touch Too Much" (AC/DC cover)	4:32
3.	"Wrecking Ball"	3:35

== Personnel ==
- Neil Turbin – vocals
- Jeff Scott Soto
- Ronnie Borchert
- Vern Anderson – rhythm/lead guitar
- Ryan "Lucky" Luciano – bass guitar
- Rick Sanchez – drums
- Sean McNabb
- Paul Monroe
- Claude Schnell
- Paul Shortino
- Mitch Perry
- Andy Walo
- Henry Moreno
- Sandy Vaquez
