= Nobody Loves You More =

Studio album by Kim Deal
- Released: November 22, 2024
- Recorded: 2011–2022
- Studios: Candyland (Dayton, Kentucky); Electrical Audio (Chicago); Reel Love (Dayton, Ohio); Summerland (Summerland Key); Manny's Mic Locker (Los Angeles); Kim's basement
- Genre: Alternative rock
- Length: 35:45
- Label: 4AD
- Producer: Kim Deal

Nobody Loves You More is the debut solo album by the American musician Kim Deal. It was released on November 22, 2024, by 4AD, and promoted with the singles "Coast", "Crystal Breath", "A Good Time Pushed" and "Nobody Loves You More".

== Background ==
Nobody Loves You More is Deal's first solo album. It includes contributions from her former Breeders bandmates, including her sister Kelley Deal, Jim MacPherson and Mando Lopez, as well as Savages' Fay Milton and Ayse Hassan, Raymond McGinley of Teenage Fanclub, and the Raconteurs’ Jack Lawrence.

The album includes over a decade's work, with its earliest songs dating back to 2011, shortly after Deal's departure from the Pixies following their Lost Cities Tour. "Are You Mine?" and "Wish I Was" were written in 2011 and released in 2013 as part of a self-released seven-inch vinyl series in 2013. Steve Albini, a frequent collaborator, recorded "A Good Time Pushed" in the final sessions at Electrical Audio in Chicago before his death in May 2024.

== Composition ==
Nobody Loves You More blends familiar Breeders-esque rock with surprising stylistic choices, such as bossa nova and brass instrumentation, as heard in the title track. Songs such as "Disobedience" and "Big Ben Beat" evoke Breeders songs, while others, such as "Wish I Was", reimagine earlier material with fresh arrangements. The album retains Deal's style, offering both familiarity and innovation.

The themes range from the deeply personal to whimsical inspirations. For instance, the poignant track "Are You Mine?" is inspired by a moment with Deal's mother, who suffered from Alzheimer's. Conversely, "Crystal Breath" arose from Deal's admiration for actress Rose Byrne, though the song's intended purpose as a TV theme was ultimately declined.

== Critical reception ==
Professional ratings
Aggregate scores
Source	Rating
Metacritic	89/100
Review scores
Source	Rating
AllMusic	4.5/5 stars
Classic Rock	4/5 stars
Consequence	B+
DIY	4/5 stars
The Independent	4/5 stars
Mojo	5/5 stars
NME	4/5 stars
Paste	9.2/10
Rolling Stone	4/5 stars
Uncut	4.5/5 stars

According to the review aggregator Metacritic, Nobody Loves You More received "universal acclaim" based on a weighted average score of 89 out of 100 from 17 critic scores.

The Quietus highlighted the range, from the vibrant, brass-infused bossa nova of the title track to the raw vulnerability of songs like "Are You Mine?". AllMusic added their 'Editor's Choice' tag to the collection and stated "Nobody Loves You More is some of her finest music yet, and while any of these songs would've been a standout with one of her other projects, it's all the sweeter that they're hers alone".

=== Year-end lists ===
Select year-end rankings for Nobody Loves You More
Publication/critic	Accolade	Rank	Ref.
Mojo	The Best Albums Of 2024	6	
Uncut	80 Best Albums of 2024	42	

== Track listing ==
All tracks are written by Kim Deal. Additional lyrics on "Nobody Loves You More" written by Nick Eddy.

No.	Title	Length
1.	"Nobody Loves You More"	2:55
2.	"Coast"	3:28
3.	"Crystal Breath"	3:27
4.	"Are You Mine?"	3:35
5.	"Disobedience"	3:03
6.	"Wish I Was"	4:13
7.	"Big Ben Beat"	3:39
8.	"Bats in the Afternoon Sky"	1:31
9.	"Summerland"	3:04
10.	"Come Running"	3:18
11.	"A Good Time Pushed"	3:27
Total length:		35:45

== Personnel ==
Musicians

- Kim Deal – lead vocals, bass guitar, drums, guitar, keyboards, ukulele
- Paul Mertens – horn arrangement, horn orchestration (tracks 1, 9); wind arrangement, flute, clarinet (4); string co-arrangement, French horn (9); saxophone (1)
- Susan Voelz – string arrangement (tracks 1, 4), violin (1, 4, 9), string co-arrangement (9)
- Jack Lawrence – bass guitar (tracks 1, 9)
- Britt Walford – drums (tracks 1, 9)
- Michael Mavridoglou – trumpet (track 1)
- Kelley Deal – guitar (tracks 2, 5, 6), bass pedals (3), backing vocals (11)
- Mando Lopez – bass guitar (tracks 2, 4, 6)
- Lindsay Glover – drums (tracks 2, 4)
- Chris Dixon – trombone (track 2)
- Jim McBride – trumpet (track 2)
- Dave Easley – pedal steel (track 4)
- Jim Macpherson – drums (tracks 5, 11)
- Josh Klinghoffer – additional guitar (track 6)
- Mike Montgomery – backing vocals (track 6)
- Fay Milton – drum programming, strings, synthesizers (track 7)
- Ayse Hassan – bass guitar (track 7)
- Alison Chesley – cello (track 9)
- Patrick Holmes – guitar (track 11)
- Raymond McGinley – guitar (track 11)

Technical

- Kim Deal – production, recording
- Marta Salogni – mixing
- Heba Kadry – mastering
- Ben Mumphrey – engineering, production assistance
- Steve Albini – recording (tracks 1, 2, 4–6, 9–11)
- Mike Montgomery – recording (tracks 1, 4, 6, 9)
- Manny Nieto – recording (track 6)
- Patrick Himes – recording (track 11)
- Kyle Rector – production assistance
- Jon San Paolo – engineering assistance (tracks 2, 4–6, 9–11)
- Taylor Hales – engineering assistance (track 5)
- Chris Witt – engineering assistance (track 5)

Visuals

- Alex Da Corte – creative direction
- Jake Wheeler – fabrication
- Chloe Kucirka – costume
- Matt Alie – set
- Lanie Belmont – set
- Matt Bogacki – set
- Cy Gavin – set
- Alec McGovern – set
- Alicia Rinier – set
- Rachel Brennecke – still photography
- Clint Hild – retouching
- Elliott Sellers – visual effects supervision
- Erik Ferguson – CGI art
- Harvey Benschoter – additional CGI art

== Charts ==
Chart performance for Nobody Loves You More
Chart (2024–2025)	Peak position
Austrian Albums (Ö3 Austria)	66
Belgian Albums (Ultratop Flanders)	183
Croatian International Albums (HDU)	3
New Zealand Albums (RMNZ)	29
Scottish Albums (Official Charts)	6
Swiss Albums (Schweizer Hitparade)	98
UK Albums (Official Charts)	45
UK Independent Albums (Official Charts)	4
