= The Great Gildersleeves =

Punk rock venue in Bowery, New York City

Coordinates: 40.725826°N 73.991527°W

- Gildersleeves
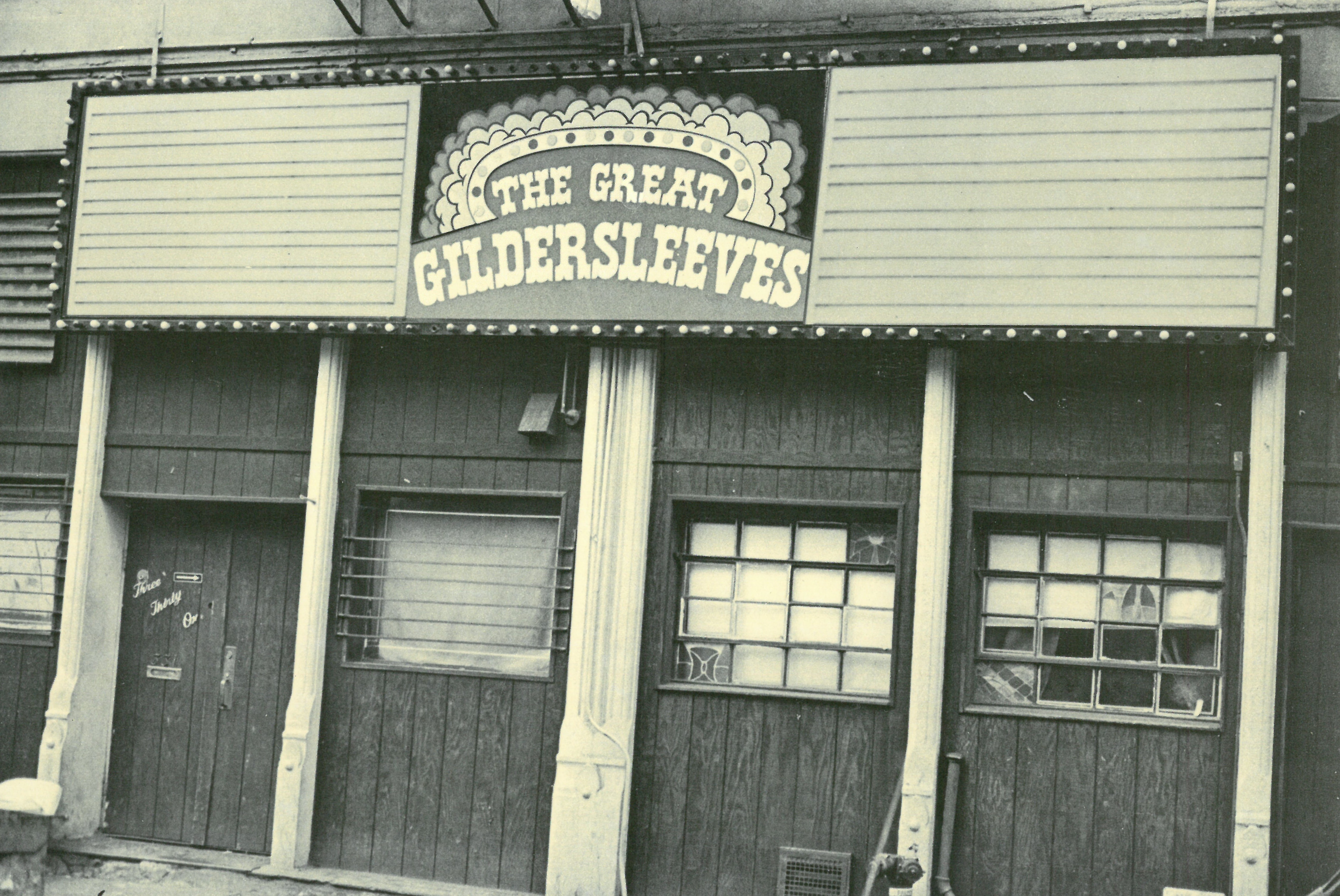
- Front of The Great Gildersleeves, early 1980's
- Interactive map of The Great Gildersleeves
- Location: 331 Bowery, New York City, NY 10003
- Capacity: 500

Construction
- Opened: August 1977
- Closed: February 1984

The Great Gildersleeves was a rock club and music venue at 331 Bowery in Manhattan. The club opened in August 1977 and closed in February 1984 after the building in which the club was located was taken by eminent domain by the New York City Board of Estimate. It was the first time that a private property was taken by eminent domain by the City of New York for use as a shelter for the homeless. The City's action followed a rent dispute between the owner of the building and the City, which leased three of the upper floors of the building that were operated as the Kenton Hotel to house approximately 200 homeless men. Following condemnation by the City, the building became a flophouse before being taken over by Project Renewal as the Kenton Hall Men's Shelter and used as a shelter for homeless men on methadone maintenance. It was named after a radio show, The Great Gildersleeve.

An album titled "Best of Great Gildersleeves" was released that featured bands who regularly performed at The Great Gildersleeves.

In 2000, the band Danger Danger named its album The Return of the Great Gildersleeves in tribute to the venue.
