= Erasers (band) =

American punk rock band

- Origin: New York City
- Years active: 1970s
- Past members: Susan Springfield; Jane Fire; Jody Beach; Richie Lure; David Ebony

Erasers was an American punk rock band active in New York City in the 1970s, often playing at CBGB (initially opening for Patti Smith). It was founded by singer and guitar player Susan Springfield and drummer Jane Fire in mid 1970s. Several other musicians played with the band over the years, including bassist Jody Beach (née Irushalmi, later wife of Chris Spedding), guitarist Richie Lure (younger brother of Walter Lure) and David Ebony. They recorded two songs, produced by Richard Lloyd: "I Won't Give Up" and "(It Was So) Funny (The Song That They Sung)". "Funny" was released in 1982 on the ROIR compilation Singles: The Great New York Singles Scene, and in 2015, both songs were released on Ork Records: New York, New York. The name of the band comes from the 1953 novel of the same name by Alain Robbe-Grillet.
