= Wanna Meet the Scruffs? =

Studio album by The Scruffs
- Released: 1977
- Genre: Power pop
- Label: Power Play

Professional ratings
Review scores
Source	Rating
AllMusic	4.5/5 stars
Christgau's Record Guide	A−
Trouser Press	mixed

Wanna Meet the Scruffs? is the debut studio album by American power pop band The Scruffs, released in 1977 by record label Power Play.

== Track listing ==
All tracks written by Stephen Burns, except where noted.

Side one

1. "Break The Ice" — 2:33
2. "My Mind" — 2:07
3. "You're No Fun" — (Dave Branyan, Burns) — 2:29
4. "Frozen Girls" — 3:00
5. "I've Got A Way" — (Branyan, Burns) — 1:53
6. "Tragedy" — 2:07
7. "This Thursday" — 2:23

Side two

8. "Revenge" — 2:48
9. "She Say Yea" — 2:47
10. "Tommy Gun" — 3:48
11. "Sad Cafe" — (Branyan, Burns) — 2:30
12. "I'm A Failure" — 2:29
13. "Bedtime Stories" — (Branyan, Burns) — 3:40

== Personnel ==
- Stephen Burns — lead vocals, rhythm guitar, piano, ARP synthesizer
- Dave Branyan — lead guitar, backing vocals
- Rick Branyan — bass, backing vocals, piano
- Zeph Paulson — drums, backing vocals
