= Ken Gorman =

American marijuana rights activist (1946–2007)

- Born: July 12, 1946; Denver, Colorado, U.S.
- Died: February 17, 2007 (aged 60); Denver, Colorado, U.S.
- Cause of death: Ballistic trauma
- Body discovered: February 17, 2007
- Occupation: Marijuana rights activist

Ken Gorman (July 12, 1946 – February 17, 2007) was a marijuana rights activist who was shot and killed in his home on February 17, 2007, in Colorado. He ran for Colorado state governor as a write-in candidate and supported pro-legalization candidates, particularly Libertarian candidate Ralph Shnelvar in the 1990s.

== Biography ==
Gorman graduated from Denver's Lincoln High School in 1964. As his father had before him, Gorman joined the US Air Force, working as an air traffic controller. He worked in Vietnam, Papua New Guinea, and the Philippines. He was stationed near Miyakojima in Japan at a long-range radar facility during the Vietnam War. His first wife introduced him to marijuana in Loveland, Colorado, in 1969. Gorman was often quoted as saying "It has been a friend of mine ever since." He went on to a career with the FAA as an air traffic controller. On August 5, 1981, while stationed in Hawaii, he was fired by Ronald Reagan along with 11,358 other PATCO (Professional Air Traffic Controllers Organization) members who were on strike.

After that, he worked in Papua New Guinea, recruiting students for "western-style" schooling. Around 1984, he became very friendly with the natives and gave them a public voice with radio broadcasts and newspaper articles about natives rights. Although he was arrested and charged with many crimes, he was only ever convicted on possession of pornography (a Playboy magazine). He was given a plane ticket to Manila, some spending money, and was escorted to the airport. Gorman's good friend, Pious Wingti, took power in 1985. Wingti's election victory was significantly due to the public outrage over Gorman's deportation. Later, he assisted the Philippine rebels in their quest to overthrow Ferdinand Marcos. He was forcibly deported in 1985. The Filipino people succeeded in deposing Marcos the following year.

In 1992, while doing business-to-business sales for Video Professor, he read The Emperor Wears No Clothes by Jack Herer. Learning about "the marijuana conspiracy" made him so angry that he dedicated his life to revealing the truth about hemp and marijuana. Gorman started a company selling hemp products. He advertised marijuana in Denver's Westword Newspaper, on the locally famous "Back Page". The ad read, "MARIJUANA - FREE DELIVERY - NO COPS - NO JOKE". Later that year, Gorman started holding "smoke-ins" on the steps of the Colorado capitol building. One of his 1993 rallies featured "The Emperor Of Hemp", Jack Herer. He ran for Colorado state governor in 1994 and 1998.

== Arrest and death ==
In May 1999, Gorman allowed himself to be arrested for selling three pounds of marijuana to a police informant who claimed to be buying it for medicinal purposes. Gorman served six months in the Jefferson County jail, 16 months in a Cañon City minimum-security facility, 18 months in a halfway house, and two years wearing a monitoring ankle bracelet. In 2000, Colorado adopted a constitutional amendment creating a medical marijuana system. After realizing the severe lack of medical grade marijuana available for patients, Gorman worked tirelessly to sign up caregivers to increase the availability of medicinal marijuana. He supported Libertarian candidates Rick Stanley for Senate and Boulder's Ralph Shnelvar for governor in 2002.

The rallies continued several times a year, but Gorman had to "officially" remove his name as organizer due to the RAVE Act of 2002 and the Illicit Drug Anti-Proliferation Act of 2003. He supplied as many patients with caregivers or medicinal marijuana as he could. In 2004/2005, he was a featured speaker at meetings of the Colorado Compassion Club in Denver which was co-founded by himself and cannabis pioneer and Social Equity activist Larisa Bolivar. Likely due to his marijuana advocacy and activism, his home was frequently targeted by burglars.

On February 17, 2007, in Denver, Colorado, Gorman was shot in the chest in his living room.

== See also ==
- List of unsolved murders (2000–present)

== Cited works and further reading ==
- Caulkins, Jonathan P.; Kilmer, Beau; Kleiman, Mark (2015). Considering Marijuana Legalization: Insights for Vermont and Other Jurisdictions. Santa Monica: RAND Corporation. ISBN 978-0-833-08875-8.
