= Marc Travanti =

American artist

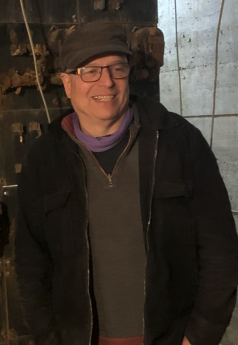
- Born: 1956 (age 69–70); Kenosha, Wisconsin
- Known for: Painting, sculpture, ceramics, photography, and video art
- Movement: Contemporary art
- Website: Official Website.

Marc Travanti is an American contemporary artist. His practice includes painting, sculpture, ceramics, photography, and video.

== Early life and education ==
Travanti was born in 1956 in Kenosha, Wisconsin. He received a BFA from the University of Wisconsin–Whitewater and a MFA from the University of Colorado Boulder. He lives and works in New York and Wisconsin.

== Career ==
Travanti’s art often involves some sort of duality. He has connected images of cell towers and early 20th century American sculpture; African masks and corporate logos; naked human bodies and stock market charts; and portraits of the living with renowned portraits from the distant past. Totemic compositions are often used, particularly in his sculptural wall work.

His art has been described as "modern artifacts; a combination of primal elements of simple organic shapes with a modern sensibility". His video work features cross-dissolves of his photographs and photocollages. Travanti's video entitled Entanglement "shows male and female figures twined around each other in ways that evoke tantric sex, wrestling, and the incarnations of Hindu deities".

== Selected exhibitions ==
=== Solo ===
- 2021: Artist Fellowship Exhibition, RAM’s Wustum Museum, Racine, WI
- 2019: Round Trip, Kenosha Public Museum, Kenosha, WI
- 2010: Entanglement, Kenosha Public Museum, Kenosha, WI
- 1989: John Davis Gallery, New York, NY

=== Group ===
- 2024: Racine and Vicinity Show 2024, RAM’s Wustum Museum, Racine, WI
- 2022: 100th AllMedia Exhibition, The Ann Arbor Art Center, Ann Arbor, MI
- 2019: Bungalow, Delaware Valley Arts Alliance, Narrowsburg, NY
- 2017: Stacked, Portrait Society Gallery, Milwaukee, WI
- 2014: Electron Salon, Los Angeles Center for Digital Art, Los Angeles, CA
- 2008: Enantiomorphic Chamber, Nurture Art, Brooklyn, NY
- 1992: FluxAttitudes, The New Museum, New York, NY
