= Ben Mumphrey =

Benjamin Mumphrey (born in New Orleans, Louisiana, United States) is an American record producer, audio engineer, and musician.

== Producer credits ==
- Frank Black albums True Blue, Show Me Your Tears, 93-03 and Devil's Workshop, all released on Cooking Vinyl;
- Black Liquor by Dash Rip Rock, released in 2012 on Alternative Tentacles;
- In The Night, the 1998 album by Famous Monsters, released by Bong Load Custom Records;
- The Chaos In Order by the Los Angeles group Let's Go Sailing;
- the Pixies song "Bam Thwok" (the first official number 1 track on the UK Download Chart on June 23, 2004).

== Engineering credits ==
- Nobody Loves You More by Kim Deal
- Jello Biafra and the New Orleans Raunch & Soul All-Stars(released in 2015 on Alternative Tentacles),
- "Ain't That Pretty At All" by the Pixies (a Warren Zevon cover from the Artemis Records album Enjoy Every Sandwich: The Songs of Warren Zevon);
- Frank Black's albums Black Letter Days (Cooking Vinyl), Honeycomb (EMI / Back Porch Records), One More Road For The Hit and Snake Oil;
- The Breeders 2009 EP, Fate to Fatal, the 2008 4AD Records album Mountain Battles, and the song "German Demonstration" (the B-side to the vinyl 7" single, "We're Gonna Rise");
- ¿Which Side Are You On?, the 2012 album by Ani Difranco;
- "Goin' Home" by B.B. King with Ivan Neville's Dumpstaphunk (the title track from the Vanguard Records album Goin' Home: A Tribute To Fats Domino);
- Alligator Records' American Patchwork by Anders Osborne;
- Sub Pop Records' Dynamite Steps by The Twilight Singers and Saturnalia by The Gutter Twins;
- Bloodshot Records' Can You Deal With It? by Andre Williams & the New Orleans Hellhounds;
- Ben Harper's Live from Mars (2nd engineer); Here Comes That Weird Chill by Mark Lanegan (assistant engineer);
- various recordings by Paul Avion;
- "Hard Luck Guy" by Greg Dulli (featuring Quintron), released in 2007 by Shake-It Records, as part of a series covering the songs of the late Muscle Shoals guitarist and songwriter Eddie Hinton.

== Musician credits ==
The Breeders, "Pinnacle Hollow" (bass); Frank Black & the Catholics, "Velvety" (percussion); Greg Dulli, "Hard Luck Guy" (drums).

Mumphrey was the stage sound mixer for the Pixies' 2004 reunion tour, documented in the film loudQuietloud: A Film About the Pixies. He also worked as a staff engineer at Sound City Studios in Los Angeles, and Studio in the Country, in Washington Parish, Louisiana.

In 2013, Mumphrey played a bit part as a recording engineer on the series finale of the HBO television show Treme, "To Miss New Orleans".
