= Prix =

American power pop band

- Origin: Memphis, Tennessee, United States
- Genres: Rock; power pop
- Years active: 1975–1977
- Labels: Ork Records; Miracle Records; HoZac Records
- Past members: Tommy Hoehn; Jon Tiven; Rick Clark; Chris Bell; Alex Chilton; Hilly Michaels; Doug Snyder; Vic Steffans

Prix was an American power pop band formed in Memphis, Tennessee, in 1975 by Tommy Hoehn and Jon Tiven. The group ended up primarily as a studio project. Its recordings were produced by Tiven along with former Big Star member Chris Bell, who also played guitar and sang backup vocals. Alex Chilton also participated in the recordings, along with session drummer Hilly Michaels.

Although the group generated some major record label interest—notably from Mercury Records and Columbia/CBS Records—it ultimately only released a double A-side single on Ork Records in 1977 and a single on Miracle Records in 1978. Its only live performance came at a CBS Records showcase in 1976. In 1977, just as Ork Records released the first single and booked the group at CBGB, Prix broke up due both to Hoehn's unwillingness to remain in New York and to creative differences. In 1978, two of the songs recorded during the Prix sessions were included on Losing You to Sleep, Hoehn's major label solo debut on London Records.

In 2002, the Japanese label Air Mail Music released Historix, a CD-only collection of all eleven songs recorded by Prix, plus four alternate versions. Stephen Thomas Erlewine of AllMusic described the songs as "11 sparkling, diamond-hard pop gems that will prove to be irresistible to power pop fanatics." In 2015, six of the songs were released on the compilation Ork Records: New York, New York. In 2016, HoZac Records re-released Historix on vinyl and CD.

== Discography ==
Singles

- Girl / Everytime I Close My Eyes / Zero (Ork Records, 1977)
- Love You Tonight (Miracle Records, 1978)

Compilations

- Historix (Air Mail Records, 2002; re-released, HoZac Records, 2016)
- Ork Records: New York, New York (Numero Records, 2015)
