= Video Professor =

American company

Video Professor, Inc.
- Type: Private
- Industry: Education
- Founded: 1987
- Headquarters: 12055 W. 2nd Place, Lakewood, Colorado, U.S.
- Products: Computer literacy documentation
- Number of employees: Unknown
- Website: www.videoprofessor.com

Video Professor, Inc. was an American company that developed and marketed tutorials for a variety of computer-related subjects, such as learning to use Microsoft Word, Microsoft Windows, and eBay. Video Professor was founded in 1987 by John W. Scherer and was located in Lakewood, Colorado. It was known in the U.S. for its commercials and infomercials on late night television and print ads almost daily in USA Today and other nationally-distributed newspapers. The company has been the subject of controversy regarding its sales and billing practices, as well as lawsuits it has filed against online critics of the company.

== Company founding and marketing ==
The company was an outgrowth of Data Link Research Services (DLRS), a seller of PC clones founded in Colorado in 1987 by John W. Scherer. In 1987, DLRS produced its first VHS tutorial primarily for its own customers, Introduction to DOS. Scherer says that he quickly realized that the tutorials were more profitable than the PC clones, and in 1988 the company switched to focusing solely on the tutorials, and changed its name to Video Professor.

The company was perhaps best known in the U.S. for its frequent late-night commercials and infomercials, most of which featured Scherer. The company's first infomercial was aired in 1991, and since then all but one of the commercials and infomercials had been produced by an in-house production team. The production values of the commercials were intentionally kept minimal. The company started with VHS lessons, but began offering its lessons on CD-ROM in 1996, and online in 2003. Lesson sets were primarily sold through TV offers and online, and in later years, Scherer reached his target audience by repeatedly using the redundant phrase "learning lessons."

== Business model ==
For CD-ROM lessons, Video Professor used a continuity sales model, similar to the model for mail order book clubs. The subscription started when a customer ordered a tutorial on a subject of their choosing. This tutorial was often free except for shipping and handling. The customer then periodically received other tutorials on subjects chosen by Video Professor automatically, until the subscription was canceled. The cost ranged from $60–$399 per tutorial. For online lessons, the same lessons are provided to the customer through streaming media. These lessons are billed on a per-month basis; access to all lessons is available for a monthly subscription fee of approximately $30.

Video Professor also used this business model in conjunction with social media gaming services such as OfferPal and SuperRewards. Users were offered in-game currency if they signed up to receive a free learning CD from Video Professor. The user was told they would pay nothing except a $10 shipping charge. But the fine print, on a different page from checkout, told them they were really getting a set of CDs and would be billed $399.99 unless they returned them. According to Michael Arrington, the founder of TechCrunch, Video Professor was an Internet scam.

The company has been criticized for its CD-ROM sales and advertising practice. Some complaints center on an alleged lack of clarity regarding the nature of the continuity sales model and the "free" CD-ROM. Others are based on the lack of choice the customer has in subsequent offerings. The company says that such complaints are rare and promptly resolved. According to Video Professor, it is standard policy to take 30 business days to issue a refund on any returned items.

During the 2000s, the company began to develop and focus on its Video Professor Online lesson delivery where lessons were streamed directly to the customer's computer, with the customer having temporary access to the entire learning library versus owning individual lessons.

== Decline ==
Despite its omnipresent cable television commercials in 2009, Video Professor's sales went from $140 million in 2006 to less than 1/3 of that two years later. In 2009, Video Professor tried and apparently failed to raise $10 million in cash.

By April 2010, Video Professor, Inc. indicated it would undergo "reorganization," and placed most of its employees on unpaid furlough. Their phone lines were also shut down. Consequently, existing customers were unable to contact the company for any type of customer service including refunds, cancellations or technical support. Despite knowing the company’s demise was imminent, Video Professor continued to accumulate debt with advertising and marketing companies. This, as well as other unethical business practices, brought the company’s management under heavy scrutiny and criticism. Video Professor also lost its rating with the Better Business Bureau.

In May 2010, Video Professor was reported to have permanently closed, with reports of no one responding to customers' calls, emails or letters. Both the company and John Scherer ignored or failed to respond to at least one filed lawsuit challenging their television advertising practices. Lawyers who had previously represented Video Professor in court did not respond to inquiries during this time (roughly 2010 and 2011). John Scherer's Denver-area home was sold for just under $3 million. After late April 2010, he ceased blogging on his own blog or Video Professor's blog, and ceased tweeting. According to the company website at www.videoprofessor.com, Video Professor was sold in full by a holding company owned by Robert Elliott Alpert, Falan Funding Corporation based in Scottsdale, AZ. The Arizona Corporation File Number for Falan Funding is F-1459848-0. It appeared that customers who didn't receive refunds prior to the ownership change would lose their money and not be refunded. In 2012, Video Professor, Inc. changed its name to Content Distributing, Inc. and filed for bankruptcy in Colorado Dist. Bankruptcy Court (Case No. 10-34729 MER).

The company's corporate headquarters in Lakewood, Colorado was posted for sale at a price of $2.875 million. This is exactly $1 million more than the company's purchase price of the building in 2002.

In 2011, Scherer launched a new website promoting himself as a public speaker and as talent for commercials. Toward the time of its permanent closing, Video Professor ceased using Scherer's image in its online advertising, although he reappeared in its advertising for a few months after the company's assets were sold in early 2010. John Scherer is now also listed as CEO of Hurricane Canless Air System.

== Sales practice controversy ==
Video Professor, Inc has been criticized for allegedly using deceptive and unethical sales practices regarding its television and internet advertisements offering a free trial of a CD-ROM for just the cost of shipping and handling – with terms stating that the customer will be billed amounts including $190 to $399.99 (depending on the version of the offer) for other Video Professor products at the end of their trial period unless the customer has canceled their trial.

Numerous complaints allege that full terms of the offers (regarding the billing at the end of the trial period) are not clearly disclosed, while others allege that customers were billed in full without their consent immediately upon placing the order for the free trial. Complaints also allege that customers have been unable to receive a refund after they were unknowingly billed in full.

Video Professor was the subject of the 5th highest number of complaints (112) filed with Colorado's Office of the Attorney General in 2009 and was the 10th highest(15 complaints) in January–February 2010.

As a result of thousands of customer complaints to the Better Business Bureau, Video Professor, Inc had its BBB Accreditation revoked, and as of May 2012, held an F rating with the Better Business Bureau.

== Video Professor lawsuit ==
In September 2007, the company filed a lawsuit against 100 anonymous posters of critical reviews, stating their belief that the negative reviews were the result of a competitor's efforts to damage Video Professor's reputation. Most of the negative reviewers were critical of Video Professor's practice of automatically charging customers' credit cards $189.95 for the first lesson as well as each subsequent month after their "one free disk" offer, complaining either that they were not informed or had difficulty canceling the charges.

The legal action launched by the company was criticized by the consumer advocacy group, Public Citizen. As part of their action, Video Professor requested and received the IP addresses of registered Wikipedia users from the Wikimedia Foundation Inc, the publisher of Wikipedia, who posted what Video Professor claimed was defamatory information about their business. Video Professor sent Internet provider Comcast a subpoena for the user identity of the IP addresses; however, Comcast refused, stating they only relinquish that information under court order, not subpoena. In late December 2007, Video Professor Inc. withdrew its lawsuit against John Does 1 through 100 in the U.S. District Court for the District of Colorado.

The company has also made claims of defamation and trademark abuse against several publications, including Uncyclopedia in December 2008, demanding that all content relating to the Video Professor be removed within 48 hours.
