= Supercrawl =

Annual art and indie music festival held each September in downtown Hamilton, Ontario

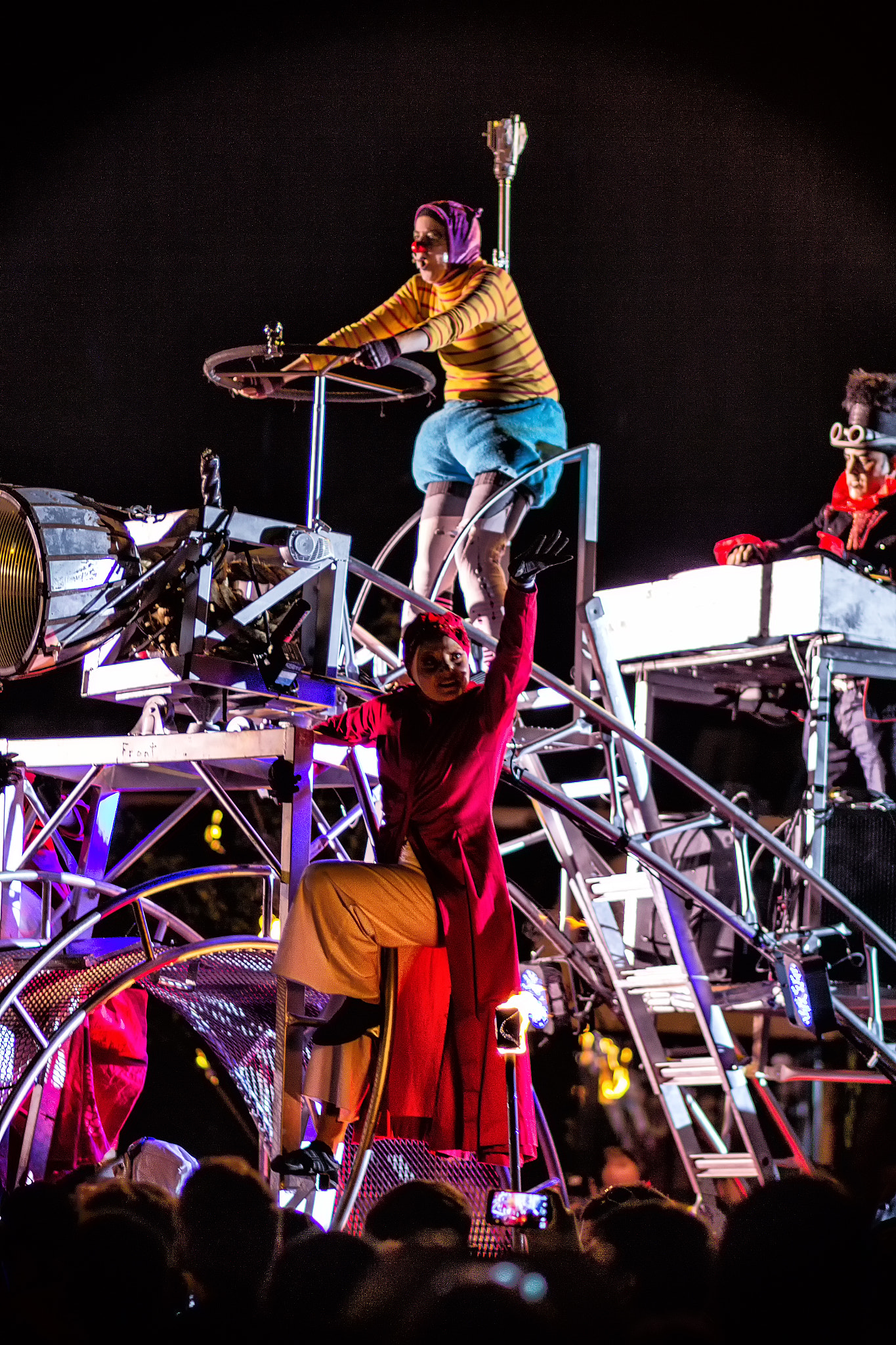
- Circus Orange performing during the 2014 edition of Supercrawl
- Genre: Music festival, Arts festival
- Dates: Second Weekend in September
- Locations: Hamilton, Ontario, Canada
- Years active: 2009-2019, 2021-present
- Attendance: 250,000+ (2019); 275,000+ (2022)
- Website: Official website

Supercrawl is an annual art and indie music festival held each September in downtown Hamilton, Ontario.

== History ==
Supercrawl was founded in 2009, out of a desire to showcase Hamilton's cultural vibrancy and eclectic arts landscape. The city's landmark multi-arts festival, the event presents independent music alongside art installations, fashion, performance, literature, theatre, and artisanal craft. A free, weekend-long experience spread across more than two kilometres of downtown streets, its attendance has grown from 3,000 in 2009 to more than 285,000 in 2024.

In June 2020, Supercrawl organizers announced that they would be reconfiguring festival programming in response to logistical uncertainties around coronavirus impacts, with smaller-scale events taking place in late 2020 and early 2021. In the place of the annual free street festival, organizers produced the paid, socially distanced Skytop Concert Series in September 2020 and the free, lakefront On The Bay concert event in September 2021. Because of provincial public health restrictions in effect at the time, the former's six-concert series was limited to 100 attendees per show, while the latter was capped at 15,000 attendees. The free street festival returned in September 2022 for its 12th annual on-street activation, covering 20 city blocks and attracting more than 275,000 visitors.

Though much of Supercrawl takes place along James Street North, the festival is not connected with the smaller-scale monthly event known as the James North Art Crawl.

== Overview ==
Supercrawl features three days of free music and arts featured on-street and across multiple stages lining the length of James Street North. The festival attracts over 250,000 visitors annually to watch over 50 bands, making it one of the largest free music festivals in Ontario.

Supercrawl has been cited as part of a larger, arts-based revival in Hamilton as the former industrial city becomes a regional center for the arts.

In 2015, Supercrawl was named Ontario's Tourism Event of the Year as part of the Ontario Tourism Awards of Excellence and was a finalist for Ontario's Tourism Event of the Year in 2019. The festival also received a 2017 nomination for the Metro Toronto Convention Centre Event Of The Year from the Canadian Tourism Awards.

In 2015, the organizers of Supercrawl Productions began to expand into one-off events at other times of the year, under the billing Supercrawl Presents.

== Programming ==
Supercrawl's stages showcase a spectrum of musical styles, from pop, indie rock, electronic, soul, R&B and hip-hop, to funk, folk, blues, jazz, and orchestral.

Supercrawl also showcases large-scale visual art installations, independent fashion, street theatre, performance art, dance, sports, an authors' tent, an artisan market and food trucks.
