= Terry Ork =

American band manager and record producer (active since 1960s)

William Terry Ork (born William Terry Collins) was an American band manager and record producer for the punk rock and new wave scene in New York City in the mid 1970s. Ork is associated with the success of the club CBGB as manager for punk band Television and musician Richard Hell. Ork arrived in New York City in the late 1960s and worked briefly for Andy Warhol's Interview magazine. While working as the manager of a film bookstore called Cinemabilia, Ork met Billy Ficca, Tom Verlaine and Hell of the Neon Boys and introduced them to Richard Lloyd. Ork began managing the new band when they reformed as Television. In 1975, he founded Ork Records, which released Television's Little Johnny Jewel (1975), Richard Hell's Blank Generation, The Marbles' Red Light (1979), Mick Farren's Lost Johnny, and the double A-side single Girl and Everytime I Close My Eyes by Prix, among other recordings. Farren said, "Terry Ork was an idealist, as true to the punk ethic as you could be, which means that when it all started getting slick, and the bands were getting deals, Terry was left behind." He died from colorectal cancer in San Diego on October 20, 2004.

In the 2013 film CBGB, Ork was portrayed by Johnny Galecki.

In 2015, The Numero Group released a retrospective box set of recordings from Ork Records.
