= Black Francis discography =

- Studio albums: 15
- Extended plays: 1
- Soundtrack albums: 1
- Live albums: 4
- Compilation albums: 5
- Singles: 15

The discography of Black Francis, an American rock musician, includes 15 studio albums, four live albums, five compilation albums, one EP, one soundtrack album, and 15 singles.

This list includes material recorded as Black Francis or Frank Black, but does not include material performed with Pixies or Grand Duchy.

== Albums ==
=== Studio albums ===
Title	Album details	Peak chart positions								
Title	Album details	US	US Heat	US Ind.	AUS	FRA	GER	NL	NZ	UK
As Frank Black
Frank Black	Released: March 8, 1993; Label: 4AD, Elektra	117	2	—	—	—	83	34	14	9
Teenager of the Year	Released: May 23, 1994; Label: 4AD, Elektra	131	2	—	76	—	60	45	35	21
The Cult of Ray	Released: January 22, 1996; Label: American	127	1	—	—	—	71	95	—	39
As Frank Black and the Catholics
Frank Black and the Catholics	Released: September 9, 1998; Label: SpinART	—	—	—	—	56	—	—	—	61
Pistolero	Released: March 9, 1999; Label: SpinART	—	—	—	—	—	—	—	—	—
Dog in the Sand	Released: January 30, 2001; Label: Cooking Vinyl, W.A.R.?	—	—	—	—	64	—	—	—	81
Black Letter Days	Released: August 20, 2002; Label: SpinART, Cooking Vinyl	—	48	40	—	—	—	—	—	—
Devil's Workshop	Released: August 20, 2002; Label: SpinART, Cooking Vinyl	—	—	47	—	—	—	—	—	—
Show Me Your Tears	Released: September 8, 2003; Label: SpinART, Cooking Vinyl	—	30	24	—	113	—	—	—	—
As Frank Black
Frank Black Francis	Released: October 12, 2004; Label: SpinART, Cooking Vinyl	—	—	45	—	—	—	—	—	—
Honeycomb	Released: July 19, 2005; Label: Back Porch, Cooking Vinyl	—	11	—	—	156	—	—	—	—
Fast Man Raider Man	Released: June 20, 2006; Label: Back Porch, Cooking Vinyl	—	27	—	—	129	—	—	—	—
As Black Francis
Bluefinger	Released: September 11, 2007; Label: Cooking Vinyl	—	42	—	—	108	—	—	—	—
NonStopErotik	Released: March 30, 2010; Label: Cooking Vinyl	—	31	—	—	—	—	—	—	—
Paley & Francis (with Reid Paley)	Released: October 11, 2011; Label: Cooking Vinyl, Sonic Unyon	—	—	—	—	—	—	—	—	—
"—" denotes a recording that did not chart or was not released in that territory.

=== Live albums ===
Title	Album details
The Black Sessions	Released: 1994; Label: Virgin/4AD
Live at the Hotel Utah Saloon	Released: 2008; Label: The Bureau
Live in Nijmegen	Released: 2012; Label: The Bureau
Live at Melkweg	Released: 2012; Label: The Bureau

=== Compilation albums ===
Title	Album details
Oddballs	Released: 2000; Label: The Bureau
Christmass	Released: December 18, 2006; Label: Cooking Vinyl
Frank Black 93–03	Released: June 4, 2007; Label: Cooking Vinyl
Abbabubba	Released: March 15, 2011; Label: The Bureau
Frank Black and the Catholics: The Complete Recordings	Released: April 6, 2015; Label: Cooking Vinyl

=== Soundtrack albums ===
Title	Album details
The Golem	Released: February 23, 2010; Label: The Bureau

== Extended plays ==
Title	Album details	Peak chart positions	
Title	Album details	US Heat	UK
The John Peel Session (with Teenage Fanclub)	Released: August 6, 1995; Label: Strange Fruit	—	98
Svn Fngrs	Released: March 3, 2008; Label: Cooking Vinyl	35	—
"—" denotes a recording that did not chart or was not released in that territory.

== Singles ==
Title	Year	Peak chart positions				Album
Title	Year	US Alt.	BEL (Fl)	FRA	UK	Album
"Los Angeles"	1993	6	—	11	—	Frank Black
"Hang On to Your Ego"	1993	8	43	—	—	Frank Black
"Headache"	1994	10	—	—	53	Teenager of the Year
"Men in Black"	1995	—	—	—	37	The Cult of Ray
"The Marsist"	1995	—	—	—	—	The Cult of Ray
"I Don't Want to Hurt You"	1996	—	—	—	63	The Cult of Ray
"You Ain't Me"	1996	—	—	—	—	The Cult of Ray
"All My Ghosts"	1998	—	—	—	87	Frank Black and the Catholics
"I Gotta Move"	1998	—	—	—	—	Frank Black and the Catholics
"Robert Onion"	2000	—	—	—	—	Dog in the Sand
"St. Francis Dam Disaster"	2001	—	—	—	—	Dog in the Sand
"Everything Is New"	2003	—	—	—	92	Show Me Your Tears
"Nadine"	2003	—	—	—	—	Show Me Your Tears
"Threshold Apprehension"	2007	—	—	—	—	Bluefinger
"The Seus"	2008	—	—	—	—	Svn Fngrs
"—" denotes a recording that did not chart or was not released in that territory.

== Other appearances ==
Year	Title	Label	Notes
1996	Songs in the Key of X: Music from and Inspired by the X-Files	Warner Bros	Compilation album released in association with the American science fiction television series The X-Files Track: "Man of Steel"
1998	Super Bad @ 65: A Tribute to James Brown	Zero Hour	Tribute album for James Brown Track: "Mother Popcorn (You Got to Have a Mother for Me)"
2000	Heroes & Villains: Music Inspired by The Powerpuff Girls	Rhino	Compilation album released in association with the American cartoon series The Powerpuff Girls. Also played during the credits of The Powerpuff Girls Movie. Track: "Pray for the Girls"
2003	Wig in a Box	Off Records	Charity tribute album of songs from Hedwig and the Angry Inch Track: "Sugar Daddy"
2005	High School Reunion	American Laundromat Records/ Face Down Records	1980s film tribute album Track: "Repo Man" (Iggy Pop cover)
2006	Hello Radio: The Songs of They Might Be Giants	Bar/None	Tribute album for the band They Might Be Giants Track: "Road Movie to Berlin"
2009	New Tales to Tell: A Tribute to Love and Rockets	Justice Records	Tribute album for the band Love and Rockets Track: "All in My Mind"

== Guest appearances ==
Year	Title	Label	Notes
1994	Pawnshop Guitars	Virgin	The debut solo album by the former Guns N' Roses guitarist Gilby Clarke (as Frank Black) – guitars, background vocals Track: "Jail Guitar Doors" (The Clash cover)
1995	The Sacred Squall Of Now	Upstart Records/Continental Record Services	The debut solo album by Reeves Gabrels (as Frank Black) – co-writer, vocals, rhythm guitar Track: "119 Years Ago"
1995	Ball-Hog or Tugboat?	Columbia	The debut solo album by the former Minutemen bass guitarist Mike Watt (as Frank Black) – lead vocals Track: "Chinese Firedrill"
1995	E-Ticket Ride	Columbia	7" promo for Ball-Hog or Tugboat? (as Frank Black) – vocals Track: "Big Bang Theory"
2000	Ulysses (Delta Notte)	E-Magine Records	Reeves Gabrels album (as Frank Black) – vocals, rhythm guitar Track: "Jewel" feat. David Bowie & Dave Grohl
2000	(Breach)	Interscope Records	The Wallflowers 3rd album (as Frank Black) – backing vocals Track: "Letters from the Wasteland"
2000	A Merilly Christmas	MEC	Alan Merrill Christmas album (as Frank Black) – backing vocals Track: "Let's think about it"
2001	The Best of Pigface: Preaching to the Perverted	Invisible Records	Recorded but unused for the 1991 Pigface live album Welcome to Mexico... Asshole (as Black Francis) - background talking & guitars Tracks: "Ogre (& The Six Million Dollar Man)" & "Dog"
2002	Hitting the Ground	Instinct Records	Debut solo album by Gordon Gano (as Frank Black) – vocals Track: "Run"
2016	This Becomes Us	Prescription	The debut solo album by the former Million Dead and Future of the Left bassist Julia Ruzicka – vocals Track: "Painter Man Is Coming"

== Music videos ==
Year	Album	Title	Director
1993	Frank Black	Los Angeles	John Flansburgh
1993	Frank Black	Hang on to Your Ego	John Flansburgh
1994	Teenager of the Year	Headache	Adam Bernstein
1995	The Cult of Ray	Men in Black	Mike Mills (director)
1996	The Cult of Ray	I Don’t Want to Hurt You (Every Single Time)	Adam Bernstein

== See also ==
- Pixies discography
- Grand Duchy
