= Frank Black 93–03 =

Compilation album by Frank Black
- Released: 4 June 2007
- Recorded: 1993–2003, 2006
- Genre: Alternative rock
- Length: 79:06
- Label: Cooking Vinyl
- Producer: Frank Black et al.

Frank Black chronology
Christmass (2006)	Frank Black 93–03 (2007)	Bluefinger (2007)

Frank Black 93–03 is a compilation album by Frank Black, released in June 2007 by Cooking Vinyl. It highlights the 10 years of his solo career after disbanding the influential alternative rock band, the Pixies in 1993, as well as songs from the many albums he created with backing band "the Catholics". Included also is material from his next solo album, Bluefinger, in the form of a hidden track, "Threshold Apprehension". Each release comes with a second disc of live recordings, which varies depending on the region the album was released in. All live tracks were recorded during Black's fall 2006 North American tour.

Professional ratings
Review scores
Source	Rating
Allmusic	4/5 stars
Blender	3/5 stars
Entertainment Weekly	B+
The Music Box	4/5 stars
musicOMH	4/5 stars
NME	6/10
Pitchfork	7.8/10

== Track listing ==
=== Disc one ===
All tracks are written by Frank Black.

No.	Title	Original release	Length
1.	"Los Angeles"	Frank Black, 1993	4:09
2.	"Ten Percenter"	Frank Black	3:29
3.	"Czar"	Frank Black	2:42
4.	"Old Black Dawning"	Frank Black	2:04
5.	"(I Want to Live on An) Abstract Plain"	Teenager of the Year, 1994	2:19
6.	"Calistan"	Teenager of the Year	3:24
7.	"Speedy Marie"	Teenager of the Year	3:35
8.	"Headache"	Teenager of the Year	2:54
9.	"Freedom Rock"	Teenager of the Year	4:19
10.	"Men in Black"	The Cult of Ray, 1996	3:03
11.	"You Ain't Me"	The Cult of Ray	2:43
12.	"I Don't Want to Hurt You (Every Single Time)"	The Cult of Ray	3:05
13.	"All My Ghosts"	Frank Black and the Catholics, 1998	3:33
14.	"I Gotta Move"	Frank Black and the Catholics	3:38
15.	"Bad Harmony"	Pistolero, 1999	3:19
16.	"Western Star"	Pistolero	3:11
17.	"Robert Onion"	Dog in the Sand, 2001	4:01
18.	"Hermaphroditos"	Dog in the Sand	4:12
19.	"Velvety"	Devil's Workshop, 2002	2:29
20.	"California Bound"	Black Letter Days, 2002	3:25
21.	"Massif Centrale"	Show Me Your Tears, 2003	4:54
22.	"Manitoba"	Show Me Your Tears	4:34
23.	"Threshold Apprehension" (Hidden track; radio edit)	Bluefinger, 2007	3:52
Total length:			79:06

=== Disc two ===
All tracks are written by Frank Black, except where noted.

North American track listing
No.	Title	Length
1.	"Deadman’s Curve" (Live)	2:45
2.	"Raiderman" (Live)	3:23
3.	"My Terrible Ways" (Live)	3:49
4.	"I’ll Be Blue" (Live)	4:21
5.	"Johnny Barleycorn" (Live)	4:44
6.	"Ten Percenter" (Live)	3:24
7.	"Dog Gone" (Live)	3:36
8.	"The Swimmer" (Live)	3:05
9.	"Suffering" (Live)	2:57

European and Australian track listing
No.	Title	Writer(s)	Length
1.	"Bullet" (Live)		4:57
2.	"Nadine" (Live)		3:41
3.	"Remake/Remodel" (Live)	Bryan Ferry	3:38
4.	"Living on Soul" (Live)		2:38
5.	"That Burnt Out Rock 'n' Roll" (Live)	Gary Green	2:49
6.	"All Around the World" (Live)	Traditional; arranged by Frank Black	4:29
7.	"Six Sixty Six" (Live)	Larry Norman	4:04
8.	"Horrible Day" (Live)		4:15
9.	"(Do What You Want) Gyaneshwar" (Live)		3:05

Japanese track listing
No.	Title	Writer(s)	Length
1.	"Ten Percenter" (Live)		3:24
2.	"Deadman’s Curve" (Live)		2:45
3.	"My Terrible Ways" (Live)		3:49
4.	"I’ll Be Blue" (Live)		4:21
5.	"Bullet" (Live)		4:58
6.	"Nadine" (Live)		3:42
7.	"Remake/Remodel" (Live)	Ferry	3:39
8.	"Living on Soul" (Live)		2:38
9.	"Suffering" (Live)		2:57
10.	"I Burn Today" (Live)		3:51
11.	"I’m Not Dead (I’m in Pittsburgh)" (Live)	Black, Reid Paley	4:09
12.	"Sing for Joy" (Live)		5:34

== Personnel ==
Credits adapted from the album's liner notes, except where noted.

=== Musicians on best of disc ===
- Frank Black
- Jean Black
- Scott Boutier
- Jason Carter
- Violet Clark
- Andy Diagram
- Eric Drew Feldman
- Rich Gilbert
- Bob Guisti
- Cynthia Haagens
- Dave McCaffrey
- Keith Moliné
- Van Dyke Parks
- Dave Philips
- Eric Potter
- Stan Ridgway
- Joey Santiago
- Dan Schmid
- Moris Tepper
- Nick Vincent
- Pietra Wexstun
- Lyle Workman
- Matt Yelton

=== Musicians on live disc ===
- Frank Black
- Billy Block
- Eric Drew Feldman
- Duane Jarvis
- Jack Kidney

=== Technical ===
- Frank Black – producer (tracks 1–12)
- Eric Drew Feldman – producer (tracks 1–9)
- Al Clay – producer (tracks 5–9)
- Frank Black and the Catholics – producer (tracks 13, 14, 19)
- Nick Vincent – producer (tracks 15–18, 20, 21)
- Stan Ridgway – producer (track 22)
- Ben Mumphrey – producer (track 19, live disc), mixing (live disc)
- Mark Lemhouse – producer (hidden track 23)
