= Oddballs (album) =

Compilation album by Frank Black
- Released: 2000
- Recorded: 1994–1997
- Genre: Rock
- Length: 45:04
- Label: Self-released
- Producer: Frank Black; Eric Drew Feldman; Jon Tiven; Nick Vincent

Frank Black chronology
Pistolero (1999)	Oddballs (2000)	Dog in the Sand (2001)

Professional ratings
Review scores
Source	Rating
AllMusic	3/5 stars
The Filtered Lens	C
Pitchfork	5.2/10

Oddballs is a compilation album by Frank Black, released in 2000. The album includes various B-sides and outtakes that were recorded between 1994 and 1997. The album was only available for sale at Frank Black & the Catholics shows or on eMusic. It was out of print until July 2013 when the album became available on compact disc through Black's own label the Bureau. The vinyl record was released in October 2013.

== Background ==
Most of the tracks were released in Europe as either B-sides or bonus tracks except "Jumping Beans", which is previously unreleased, and "Man of Steel", which was originally released on the various artists compilation album Songs in the Key of X. All tracks were recorded between 1994 and 1997 in Los Angeles and New York City.

Frank Black wrote in the album's liner notes, "I got together with [engineer] Dave Schiffman in Los Angeles in 1997 to review B-sides and outtakes, some to be remixed for this compilation, and so this is not a completist collection, just some songs that I liked."

== Reception ==
Andrew McNally, writing for the Filtered Lens, wrote that Oddballs "is better than most rarities collections, but it is still barely good enough to stand on its own legs." McNally felt that the album contains "some subpar tracks and ideas that should not have been acted upon." He added that the songs "more often than not sounds a little too traditional and most of the ideas are not fleshed out enough."

== Track listing ==
All tracks are written by Frank Black, except "Re-make/Re-model" by Bryan Ferry and "Just a Little" by Ron Elliott and Bob Durand.

1. "Pray a Little Faster" (trying to be Dylan) – 2:06
2. "Oddball" (trying to be Stones) – 3:00
3. "Village of the Sun" (trying to be Springsteen AND Dylan) – 3:33
4. "Baby, That's Art" (trying to be Bowie) – 2:50
5. "At the End of the World" (trying to be Bowie) – 2:25
6. "Can I Get a Witness" (trying to be Dylan) – 4:18
7. "Announcement" (trying to be Daltrey) – 6:01
8. "Hate Me" (trying to be Strummer) – 2:05
9. "Re-make/Re-model" (trying to be Sahm) – 3:41
10. "Everybody Got the Beat" (trying to be Strummer) – 1:56
11. "Jumping Beans" (trying to be Lou) – 2:55
12. "Just a Little" (trying to be me) – 2:22
13. "You Never Heard About Me" (trying to be Strummer) – 2:57
14. "Man of Steel" (trying to be me) – 4:55

== Track origins ==
- Tracks 2, 5 and 8 from the "Headache" single, 1994
- Tracks 1, 7, 9, 12 and 13 from the "Men in Black" single, 1995
- Tracks 3, 4, 6 and 10 from The Cult of Ray, limited edition bonus disc, 1996
- Track 14 from Songs in the Key of X, 1996
- Track 11 previously unreleased

== Personnel ==
Credits adapted from the album's liner notes.

Musicians

- Frank Black
- Lyle Workman
- David McCaffery
- Eric Drew Feldman
- Scott Boutier
- Nick Vincent

Technical personnel

- Frank Black – producer (tracks 1, 3, 4, 6, 7, 9, 10, 12, 13)
- Jon Tiven – producer (tracks 2, 5, 8)
- Eric Drew Feldman – producer (track 11)
- Nick Vincent – producer (track 14)
- Matt Yelton – engineer
- Jimmy Douglass – engineer
- David Schiffman – engineer, mixing
