= Abbabubba =

Compilation album by Black Francis
- Released: March 15, 2011
- Genre: Alternative rock
- Length: 50:04
- Label: The Bureau
- Producer: Jason Carter

Black Francis chronology
| NonStopErotik (2010) | Abbabubba (2011) | Paley & Francis (2011) |

Professional ratings
Review scores
| Source | Rating |
|---|---|
| Allmusic | 3.5/5 stars |

Abbabubba is a compilation album by Black Francis released on March 15, 2011, in the US. It includes B-sides, remixes and re-workings of songs released on earlier albums, as well as original material.

== Track listing ==
All tracks are written by Frank Black

| No. | Title | Length |
|---|---|---|
| 1. | "Abbabubba" | 2:31 |
| 2. | "Serious Curious" | 4:12 |
| 3. | "Il Cuchaiao" | 3:33 |
| 4. | "Alabaster" | 2:56 |
| 5. | "Rabbits" | 1:49 |
| 6. | "Dead Man's Curve" | 2:23 |
| 7. | "Polly's Into Me" | 4:43 |
| 8. | "The Seus" (Infadels Remix) | 4:51 |
| 9. | "Ghost Coming" | 2:37 |
| 10. | "The Water" | 2:38 |
| 11. | "The Seus" (Charles Normal Remix) | 3:43 |
| 12. | "Do What You Want (Gyaneshwar)" | 2:11 |
| 13. | "Get Away Oil" | 2:43 |
| 14. | "The Seus" (Bloc Party Remix) | 4:35 |
| 15. | "Virginia Reel" | 4:44 |

== Album notes ==
"Rabbits" and "Dead Man's Curve" originally appeared on the album NonStopErotik.
"The Seus" originally appeared on the album Svn Fngrs.
“Il Cuchaiao” and “The Water” were originally only available from Francis' website
"Get Away Oil" originally appeared on the Threshold Apprehension EP.
