= The Golem (album) =

- Original 2010 5-disc release

Soundtrack album by Black Francis
- Released: 13 February 2010
- Recorded: April 2008
- Venue: Castro Theatre, San Francisco, California (live recordings)
- Studio: Hyde Street Studios, San Francisco, California; Wavelength Studios, Salem, Oregon; Sprout City Studios, Eugene, Oregon
- Genre: Alternative rock
- Length: 84:05 (studio discs); 85:35 (live discs); 60:23 (one-disc edition)
- Label: Not on label The Bureau (one-disc edition)
- Producer: Eric Drew Feldman

Black Francis chronology
Svn Fngrs (2008)	The Golem (2010)	NonStopErotik (2010)

Alternative cover
- 2011 one-disc edition

Professional ratings
Aggregate scores
Source	Rating
Metacritic	68/100
Review scores
Source	Rating
Allmusic	4/5 stars
Alternative Press	6/10
Consequence of Sound	C+
Filter	84%
Pitchfork	6.4/10
Popmatters	5/10 stars

The Golem is a soundtrack written and performed by Black Francis at the 2008 San Francisco International Film Festival for the 1920 film The Golem: How He Came into the World.

The soundtrack was released in 2010 as a 5-disc set. Only 500 copies were made, and it was released exclusively for purchase from Blackfrancis.net. The set included 2 CDs containing the studio recordings, 2 CDs containing the original 2008 live performance at San Francisco International Film Festival, a DVD of The Golem: How He Came into the World with the soundtrack synced to the film, and a book containing chord charts by Nick Vincent and lyrics by Black Francis for The Golem. Each of the 500 copies were signed by Black Francis, and each were wrapped in brown paper and sealed with a "Black Francis" marked wax stamp.

A "rock songs" version, according to Francis, was released to the public in 2011. This version contains only the substantial songs, leaving out the reprises and themes that were included with the box set.

== Background ==
In April 2008, Black Francis told the Village Voice, "I'm performing it in a couple of weeks down in San Francisco at this film festival. The requisite there is to show up with some music and perform it in some way along to this movie that they're screening. And so I said, "Well, that sounds fun, but I have to sort of make a record." I have to have some sort of blueprint, you know. So I went down to San Francisco a couple of weeks ago and made a record with Eric Feldman producing. ... It took about a week, including the writing."

== Track listing ==
All tracks are written by Black Francis.

Studio disc one
No.	Title	Length
1.	"You're Gonna Pay (Preview)"	1:26
2.	"Little Stars Theme"	2:17
3.	"Bad News"	3:33
4.	"Astaroth"	2:56
5.	"The Maharal"	5:30
6.	"Miriam and Florian"	3:43
7.	"Stars Theme"	2:58
8.	"Miriam and Florian Theme (Version 1)"	1:18
9.	"Stars"	4:07
10.	"The Conjuring"	3:39
11.	"Astaroth (Reprise)"	2:06
12.	"Makanujo (Preview)"	0:50
13.	"The Word"	3:19
14.	"The Obedient Servant"	4:33
15.	"Miriam and Florian Theme (Version 2)"	0:32
16.	"Golem's Theme (Version 1)"	1:11

Studio disc two
No.	Title	Length
1.	"Miriam and Florian Theme (Version 3)"	0:37
2.	"The Maharal (Reprise)"	2:55
3.	"Golem's Theme (Version 2)"	0:57
4.	"The Flower Song (Preview)"	1:04
5.	"Golem's Theme (Version 3)"	1:21
6.	"Miriam and Florian Theme (Version 4)"	0:27
7.	"Makanujo"	3:06
8.	"Golem's Theme (Version 4)"	0:45
9.	"Meet Me at the Ghetto Gates"	4:03
10.	"Custom all the Way"	5:50
11.	"You're Gonna Pay"	3:56
12.	"The Word (Reprise)"	3:36
13.	"(Oh How I Wish I Could) Stay"	2:16
14.	"Makanujo (Reprise)"	1:00
15.	"(Oh How I Wish I Could) Stay (Reprise)"	3:09
16.	"The Flower Song"	1:53
17.	"The Golem's Theme (Version 5)"	1:57
18.	"The Obedient Servant (Reprise)"	1:06

Live at the Castro Theatre disc one
No.	Title	Length
1.	"You're Gonna Pay (Preview)"	1:37
2.	"Little Stars Theme"	2:03
3.	"Bad News"	3:16
4.	"Astaroth"	3:06
5.	"The Maharal"	5:12
6.	"Miriam and Florian"	3:29
7.	"Stars Theme / Miriam and Florian Theme (Version 1)"	5:07
8.	"Stars"	4:23
9.	"The Conjuring / Astaroth (Reprise)"	5:33
10.	"Makanujo (Preview)"	0:34
11.	"The Word"	3:03
12.	"The Obedient Servant"	3:59
13.	"Miriam and Florian Theme (Version 2)"	0:19
14.	"Golem's Theme (Version 1) / Miriam and Florian Theme (Version 3)"	3:10
15.	"The Maharal (Reprise)"	2:46
16.	"Golem's Theme (Version 2)"	1:10
17.	"The Flower Song (Preview)"	1:01
18.	"Golem's Theme (Version 3)"	1:02
19.	"Miriam and Florian (Version 4)"	0:25
20.	"Makanujo"	2:47
21.	"Golem's Theme (Version 4)"	0:48
22.	"Meet Me at the Ghetto Gates"	3:49

Live at the Castro Theatre disc two
No.	Title	Length
1.	"Custom All the Way"	5:17
2.	"Nicht!"	0:19
3.	"You're Gonna Pay"	4:05
4.	"The Word (Reprise)"	3:08
5.	"(Oh How I Wish I Could) Stay"	2:01
6.	"Makanujo (Reprise)"	0:38
7.	"(Oh How I Wish I Could) Stay (Reprise)"	3:23
8.	"The Flower Song"	1:57
9.	"The Golem's Theme (Version 5)"	2:05
10.	"The Obedient Servant (Reprise)"	1:12
11.	"Outro"	0:35

DVD
No.	Title	Length
1.	"The Golem: How He Came into the World"

=== One-disc edition ===
No.	Title	Length
1.	"Miriam and Florian Theme (Version 2)"	0:32
2.	"Makanujo"	3:04
3.	"Bad News"	3:33
4.	"The Flower Song"	1:51
5.	"(Oh How I Wish I Could) Stay"	2:13
6.	"The Word"	3:18
7.	"Astaroth"	2:57
8.	"The Obedient Servant"	4:11
9.	"The Maharal"	5:28
10.	"Little Stars Theme"	2:13
11.	"Miriam and Florian"	3:41
12.	"The Conjuring"	3:38
13.	"Meet Me at the Ghetto Gates"	4:02
14.	"Stars"	4:03
15.	"Custom All the Way"	5:35
16.	"You're Gonna Pay"	3:56
17.	"The Word (Reprise)"	3:09
18.	"The Maharal (Reprise)"	2:55

== Personnel ==
Musicians

- Black Francis – vocals, rhythm guitar
- Duane Jarvis – lead guitar
- Joseph Pope – bass
- Ralph Carney – horns
- Eric Drew Feldman – keyboards, synthetics
- Jason Carter – drums, percussion
- Roy Zimmerman – emcee at live recording

Technical

- Eric Drew Feldman – producer
- Jason Carter – engineer, mixing, photography
- Gabriel Shepard – engineer
- Thaddeus Moore – engineer
- Bobby Mack – live recording engineer
- Mark Chalecki – mastering
- Mark Lemhouse – design, layout
- Wesley Curtis – photography (album cover and band)
