= Headache (song) =

Single by Frank Black

from the album Teenager of the Year
- A-side: "Headache"
- B-side: "Men in Black"; "At the End of the World"; "Oddball"; "Hate Me"; "This Is Where I Belong"; "Amnesia"; "Headache" (N.Y.C. Version)
- Released: 1994
- Studio: The Clubhouse (Burbank), American (Calabasas)
- Length: 2:56
- Label: 4AD/Elektra
- Songwriter(s): Frank Black
- Producer(s): Eric Drew Feldman, Frank Black

Frank Black singles chronology
"Hang On to Your Ego" (1993)	"Headache" (1994)	"Men in Black" (1995)

"Headache" is a single written and performed by Frank Black. It was the sole single released from his second solo album, Teenager of the Year, released in 1994. It reached number 53 on the UK charts and number 10 on Billboard's Modern Rock Tracks.

Co-produced by Black and Eric Drew Feldman (who had contributed to the Pixies' Trompe le Monde), the "blissfully anthemic" song would later appear on greatest hits compilations for Black.

== Retrospective reception ==
The A.V. Club said the song "embodies all of the off-kilter charm and undeniable catchiness that's made Thompson's work so timeless." Interviewer Sean O'Neal described it as, "one of the greatest pop songs ever written." The Quietus said, "The tune is as deliciously catchy and Orbinsonesque [sic] as anything he'd previously written, but underlaid throughout the verse with a bassline that keeps ascending to denote pressure, it culminates in a remarkable chorus that sounds like pop's most mellifluous migraine."

== Personnel ==
- Frank Black – vocals, guitar
- Eric Drew Feldman – bass, keyboards
- Nick Vincent – drums

Technical

- Frank Black – co-producer
- Eric Drew Feldman – co-producer
- Efren Herrera – engineer
- Bill Cooper – engineer
- David Bianco – engineer, mixing
- Frank Gryner – assistant engineer
- Matt Westfield – assistant engineer
- John Jackson – assistant engineer
- Michael Halsband – photography
- v23 – design
