= Christmass (album) =

Compilation album by Frank Black
- Released: December 18, 2006
- Recorded: 2006 (studio tracks); August 19-September 10, 2006 (live tracks); August 31, 2006 (DVD)
- Genre: Alternative rock
- Length: 71:05 (CD); 38:52 (DVD)
- Label: Cooking Vinyl
- Producer: Myles Mangino

Frank Black chronology
Fast Man Raider Man (2006)	Christmass (2006)	Frank Black 93–03 (2007)

Professional ratings
Review scores
Source	Rating
AllMusic	3.5/5 stars
The Independent	3/5 stars

Christmass is a live and studio album by Frank Black, originally released by Cooking Vinyl on December 18, 2006, via mail-order only, then to stores on February 5, 2007. It includes a live DVD from a solo acoustic show.

== Contents ==
Christmass consists of fifteen live acoustic recordings from August and September 2006 and five new studio tracks recorded partly in hotel rooms and partly at Planet of Sound studios in Hartford, Connecticut. The accompanying DVD contains selections from a live acoustic show recorded at Harlow's Night Club in Sacramento, California, on August 31, 2006. The album was recorded by Myles Mangino, a sound engineer for Frank Black and a longtime Pixies lighting designer.

== Track listing ==
All tracks are written by Frank Black, except where noted.

CD
No.	Title	Writer(s)	Recording date and location	Length
1.	"(Do What You Want) Gyaneshwar"		Hotel Santa Cruz, CA, Planet of Sound, Hartford, CT	2:55
2.	"Bullet" (Live)		August 19, 2006; Southpaw, Brooklyn, NY (early show)	2:59
3.	"I Burn Today" (Live)		September 10, 2006; The Night Light Lounge, Bellingham WA	3:20
4.	"Wave of Mutilation" (Live)	Black Francis	September 10, 2006; The Night Light Lounge, Bellingham WA	1:59
5.	"Living on Soul" (Live)		September 10, 2006; The Night Light Lounge, Bellingham WA	2:56
6.	"She's My Way"	Francis	2006; the Valley River Inn, Eugene, OR, Planet of Sound, Hartford, CT	3:47
7.	"Massif Centrale" (Live)		September 10, 2006; The Night Light Lounge, Bellingham WA	5:11
8.	"Where Is My Mind?" (Live)	Francis	September 10, 2006; The Night Light Lounge, Bellingham WA	3:21
9.	"Raider Man" (Live)		September 10, 2006; The Night Light Lounge, Bellingham WA	2:22
10.	"Demon Girl"	Francis	2006; the Valley River Inn, Eugene, OR, Planet of Sound, Hartford, CT	4:00
11.	"Dead Man's Curve" (Live)		August 19, 2006; Southpaw, Brooklyn, NY (late show)	2:43
12.	"Cactus" (Live)	Francis	August 19, 2006; Southpaw, Brooklyn, NY (late show)	2:46
13.	"Six-Sixty-Six" (Live)	Larry Norman	September 10, 2006; The Night Light Lounge, Bellingham WA	1:57
14.	"Radio Lizards"	Francis	2006; the Valley River Inn, Eugene, OR, Planet of Sound, Hartford, CT	2:47
15.	"Don't Get Me Wrong"	Francis, Reid Paley	2006; Planet of Sound, Hartford, CT	3:59
16.	"All Around the World" (Live)	Traditional, arranged by Black	September 10, 2006; The Night Light Lounge, Bellingham WA	3:25
17.	"Nadine" (Live)		August 25, 2006; Auditorium Theatre, Chicago, IL	3:41
18.	"Manitoba" (Live)		August 25, 2006; Auditorium Theatre, Chicago, IL	3:24
19.	"The Water" (Live)	Francis	August 29, 2006; Pantages Theatre, Los Angeles, CA	4:05
20.	"Outtakes / Song of the Shrimp" (Live)	Roy C. Bennett, Sid Tepper	September 9, 2006 / September 10, 2006; The Clipper, Olympia, WA / The Night Light Lounge, Bellingham WA	9:28
Total length:				71:05

DVD (Live at Harlow's Night Club, Sacramento, CA, August 31, 2006)

No.	Title	Writer(s)	Length
1.	"Los Angeles"		3:39
2.	"Brackish Boy"		1:26
3.	"I Burn Today"		3:20
4.	"Cactus"	Francis	2:32
5.	"Nadine"		2:23
6.	"The Holiday Song"	Francis	2:30
7.	"Sing For Joy"		4:20
8.	"Dead Man's Curve"		2:48
9.	"California Bound"		3:24
10.	"Ed Is Dead"	Francis	1:50
11.	"My Life Is In Storage"		4:32
12.	"Two Reelers"		3:05
13.	"Whiskey in Your Shoes"		3:03
Total length:			38:52

== Personnel ==
Musicians

- Frank Black – vocals, guitar
- Rob Laufer – guitar (track 1)
- Jeff Ladd – bass (tracks 1, 6, 10)
- Myles Mangino – guitar (track 6)
- Erik James – strings, piano (track 6), synthesizer (track 10), organ (track 15)
- Dan Prindle – cello (track 6)
- Jay Anick – violin (track 6)
- Mark Mulcahy – backing vocals (tracks 14, 15)
- Rami Jaffee – accordion (tracks 17, 18)

Technical

- Myles Mangino – engineer, live recording engineer (tracks 1–16)
- Chris Henderson – assistant engineer (tracks 1, 6, 14)
- Geoff Templeton – live recording engineer (tracks 17–19)
- Andrew Swainson – design
