= Fast Man Raider Man =

Studio album by Frank Black
- Released: June 20, 2006
- Studio: Cowboy Arms (Nashville, Tennessee); Hormone Studios (Nashville, Tennessee); Better Songs and Gardens (Nashville, Tennessee; Mower Studio (Pasadena, California)
- Genre: Americana; alt country; country soul; indie rock
- Length: 94:44
- Label: Back Porch (US); Cooking Vinyl (UK)
- Producer: Jon Tiven

Frank Black chronology
Honeycomb (2005)	Fast Man Raider Man (2006)	Christmass (2006)

Professional ratings
Aggregate scores
Source	Rating
Metacritic	59/100
Review scores
Source	Rating
AllMusic	3.5/5 stars
Alternative Press	8/10
Encyclopedia of Popular Music	3/5 stars
Entertainment Weekly	B−
The Guardian	3/5 stars
Mojo	3.5/5 stars
NME	5/10
Pitchfork	6.4/10
Popmatters	5/10 stars
Uncut	1.5/5 stars

Fast Man Raider Man is the eleventh studio album and a double-album by Frank Black released in the United States on June 20, 2006, and in the United Kingdom on July 19, 2006.

== Track listing ==
All tracks are written by Frank Black, except where noted.

=== Disc one ===
No.	Title	Writer(s)	Length
1.	"If Your Poison Gets You"		2:56
2.	"Johnny Barleycorn"		4:50
3.	"Fast Man"		4:12
4.	"You Can't Crucify Yourself"		3:23
5.	"Dirty Old Town"	Ewan MacColl	3:03
6.	"Wanderlust"		3:27
7.	"Seven Days"		4:11
8.	"Raider Man"		3:04
9.	"The End of the Summer"	Black, music adapted from Gabriel Fauré's Sicilienne, Op. 78	3:53
10.	"Dog Sleep"	Black, Reid Paley	3:48
11.	"When the Paint Grows Darker Still"		3:34
12.	"I'm Not Dead" (I'm in Pittsburgh)"	Black, Paley	3:41
13.	"Golden Shore"	Black, Paley	3:17

=== Disc two ===
No.	Title	Writer(s)	Length
1.	"In the Time of My Ruin"		4:21
2.	"Down to You"	Black, Paley	2:18
3.	"Highway to Lowdown"		2:35
4.	"Kiss My Ring"		2:29
5.	"My Terrible Ways"		3:36
6.	"Fitzgerald"		3:12
7.	"Elijah"		3:16
8.	"It's Just Not Your Moment"		5:32
9.	"The Real El Rey"		3:21
10.	"Where the Wind Is Going"		3:33
11.	"Holland Town"		2:32
12.	"Sad Old World"		4:57
13.	"Don't Cry That Way"		2:25
14.	"Fare Thee Well"	Traditional, arranged by Frank Black	3:18

== Personnel ==
Credits adapted from the album's liner notes.

Musicians

- Frank Black – lead vocals, guitar, ukulele
- Bob Babbitt – bass guitar, backing vocals
- Bobby Bare Jr. – backing vocals
- Billy Block – drums, backing vocals
- Marty Brown – bass guitar, backing vocals, duet vocal on Dirty Old Town
- Violet Clark-Thompson – backing vocals
- Jack Clement – dobro, backing vocals
- Steve Cropper, Duane Jarvis, Reggie Young – guitar
- Rick Duvall – backing vocals
- Steve Ferrone, Akil Thompson, Chester Thompson – drums
- Rich Gilbert, Dave Phillips – pedal steel guitar
- James Griffin – backing vocals
- Levon Helm, Jim Keltner, Simon Kirke – drums, percussion
- David Hood, Tom Petersson – bass guitar
- Ellis Hooks – backing vocals
- Wayne Jackson – trumpet, trombone, fluegelhorn
- Mark Jordan, Ian McLagan – keyboards
- Carol Kaye – guitar, bass guitar
- Jack Kidney – harmonica, tenor saxophone
- Al Kooper – organ
- Buddy Miller – guitar, mando guitar, backing vocals
- Spooner Oldham – keyboards, backing vocals
- P.F. Sloan – piano, backing vocals
- Billy Swan – backing vocals
- Planet Swan – backing vocals
- Sierra Swan – backing vocals
- Jon Tiven – alto saxophone, guitar, percussion, piano, backing vocals
- Brooks Watson – backing vocals
- Lyle Workman – guitar, arrangements (disc 1: tracks 1, 3, 6–13; disc 2: 2, 11)

Technical

- Brian Borelli – assistant engineer
- Jake Burns – engineer, mixing
- Scott Carter – assistant engineer
- Marc Chevalier – engineer
- Adam Deane – assistant engineer
- Jim DeMain – mastering
- Earl Drake – additional mixing
- Jonathan Eubanks – assistant engineer
- Michael Halsband – photography
- Brent Hardy-Smith – illustrations
- Alex McCollough – assistant engineer
- Einar Pedersen – assistant engineer
- Dan Penn – engineer
- Adam Przybyla – assistant engineer
- Kevin Rains – assistant engineer
- Dan Steinman – assistant engineer
- Andrew Swainson – cover design, illustrations
- Jon Tiven – producer, engineer
- Brooks Watson – assistant engineer
- Miles Wilson – engineer
- David Z – mixing
