= NonStopErotik =

Studio album by Black Francis
- Released: March 30, 2010
- Studio: Ocean Way Studios, Los Angeles; RAK Studios, London; Studio G, Brooklyn
- Genre: Alternative rock
- Length: 36:53
- Label: Cooking Vinyl
- Producer: Eric Drew Feldman; Black Francis

Black Francis chronology
| The Golem (2010) | NonStopErotik (2010) | Abbabubba (2011) |

Professional ratings
Aggregate scores
| Source | Rating |
|---|---|
| Metacritic | 70/100 |
Review scores
| Source | Rating |
| Allmusic | 3/5 stars |
| Alternative Press | 8/10 |
| The A.V. Club | A− |
| NME | 8/10 |
| Pitchfork | 6.6/10 |
| Popmatters | 7/10 stars |
| Q | 3/5 stars |
| Slant Magazine | 2.5/5 stars |
| Uncut | 3/5 stars |
| Under the Radar | 3/10 stars |

NonStopErotik is the sixteenth and most recent solo studio album by Black Francis released by Cooking Vinyl on March 30, 2010, in the US, and April 5 elsewhere.

The album was recorded in Brooklyn, Los Angeles, and a "haunted studio in London." Following the album's release, Black curtailed his solo career to commit to full time recording with Pixies in 2013.

== Track listing ==
All tracks composed by Black Francis; except where indicated

1. "Lake of Sin" – 4:28
2. "O My Tidy Sum" – 3:47
3. "Rabbits" – 2:00
4. "Wheels" (Chris Hillman, Gram Parsons) – 2:38
5. "Dead Man's Curve" – 2:56
6. "Corrina" – 2:02
7. "Six Legged Man" – 2:47
8. "Wild Son" – 3:24
9. "When I Go Down on You" – 3:39
10. "Nonstoperotik" – 3:27
11. "Cinema Star" – 5:41

== Personnel ==
Credits adapted from the album's liner notes. The album sleeve features no individual credits for the musicians.

Musicians

- Black Francis
- Dave Phillips
- Eric Drew Feldman
- Todd O'Keefe
- Tony Maimone
- David Henderson
- Todd Demma
- Jack Kidney

Technical

- Eric Drew Feldman – producer
- Black Francis – producer
- Wesley Siedman – engineer (at Ocean Way Studios)
- Howard 'Head' Bullivant – engineer (at RAK Studios)
- Jonathan Sterling – assistant engineer (at Ocean Way Studios)
- Robbie Nelson – assistant engineer (at RAK Studios)
- Helen Atkinson – assistant engineer (at RAK Studios)
- Tony Maimone – assistant engineer (at Studio G)
- John Dent – mastering
- Mark Lemhouse – design
- Aaron Lucy – photography
