= Late World with Zach =

Television series

- Genre: Comedy
- Presented by: Zach Galifianakis
- Country of origin: United States
- Original language: English
- No. of seasons: 1
- No. of episodes: 36

Production
- Running time: 30 minutes
- Production companies: Brad Grey Television; VH1 Productions

Original release
- Network: VH1
- Release: March 4 – May 2, 2002

Late World with Zach is a television show on VH1 that aired in 2002 starring Zach Galifianakis, who appeared without his now-trademark beard for most of the show's run.

Late World's theme song was Frank Black's "Los Angeles", a nod to the studio's location. The show began with a monologue, like many late night talk shows, but with Galifianakis' unique style, usually involving a piano and non-sequiturs interlaced with topical humor. After this, one or two skits starring Zach followed. One of the running skits was footage of red carpet interviews, edited later with Zach asking humorously different questions. Last, Zach met with a guest like Mathew St. Patrick or Bradley Cooper, or had a musical guest like Rhett Miller. The show was canceled after nine weeks of production due to poor ratings. A then-unknown Kevin Federline had a small, non-speaking role in one of the show's last episodes.
