= Fool the World =

2005 book about American rock band Pixies

Fool the World: The Oral History of a Band Called Pixies
- Cover illustration of the UK edition
- Author: Josh Frank; Caryn Ganz
- Cover artist: Steven Appleby
- Language: English
- Publisher: Virgin Books (UK); St. Martin's Griffin (US)
- Publication date: 2005, 2006
- Publication place: United States; United Kingdom
- Media type: Print (Paperback)
- Pages: 336
- ISBN: 978-0-7535-1023-0
- OCLC: 60741140

Fool the World: The Oral History of a Band Called Pixies is a 2005 book by Josh Frank and Caryn Ganz about the American alternative rock band Pixies. The book, written as an oral history, covers the career of the band from their inception in 1985, to their breakup in 1993 and eventual reunion in 2004. Fool the World features interviews and recollections from a range of characters involved with the band, including Surfer Rosa producer Steve Albini, Kim Deal's twin sister Kelley Deal and 4AD co-founder Ivo Watts-Russell, as well as each member of the band.

The book's name, Fool the World, is the English translation of the title of Pixies' 1991 album, Trompe le Monde. It is published by Virgin Books in the United Kingdom and St. Martin's Griffin in the United States. The book's foreword is written by Chas Banks, Pixies' European tour manager. The book includes a selected discography, along with a "Fun Facts" chapter, which includes information about references to Pixies in popular culture and released Pixies covers.

== Contents ==
Fool the World was originally written as a musical by Frank, until it was suggested that he compile all his material into "one big, fat book". As a result, sections of the book are named after musical theatre terms, such as "Cast of Characters", "Acts" and "Encore". The book is split into three acts: "Boston", "U.S. vs. UK" and "Le Monde", concluding with an "encore".

=== Overture ===
Contains the "Cast of Characters" (a list of people interviewed for the book), an introduction by author Josh Frank and foreword by Pixies' European tour manager Chas Banks.

=== Act One: Boston ===
Discusses the band members' early lives, the formulation of the band in 1985 and their first recordings in 1987 which formed the basis of their first release, known as "The Purple Tape" (1987), and its abridged counterpart, Come On Pilgrim (1987).

=== Act Two: U.S. vs. U.K. ===
Covers the band's signing with 4AD Records, as well as the recording and release of the albums Surfer Rosa (1988), Doolittle (1989) and Bossanova (1990).

=== Act Three: Le Monde ===
Named after Pixies' 1991 album Trompe le Monde, this section explores the recording and release of that album, their subsequent tour supporting U2 in 1992, the breakup of the band and intervening years prior to the reunion.

=== Encore ===
The book finishes with chapters on the band's 2004 reunion and lasting impact, and an epilogue that serves as an update on the people interviewed in the book. A selected discography and "Fun Facts" appendix is also included.

== Cast of characters ==
This is a partial selection of the people interviewed for the book:

- Steve Albini – recording engineer for Surfer Rosa
- Judd Apatow – TV and film producer/director
- Steven Appleby – cartoonist, contributed illustrations to Trompe le Monde
- Beck – musician
- Bono – U2 singer and songwriter
- Billy Corgan – singer/guitarist of the Smashing Pumpkins and Zwan
- Kelley Deal – Deal's twin sister; member of the Breeders
- Kim Deal – Pixies bassist; singer/guitarist for the Breeders and the Amps
- Tanya Donelly – former guitarist/vocalist of Throwing Muses and the Breeders
- Eric Drew Feldman – former Pere Ubu and Captain Beefheart musician; keyboardist on Trompe le Monde
- Marc Geiger – Pixies' agent
- Steven Haigler – mixing engineer for Doolittle, Bossanova and Trompe le Monde
- PJ Harvey – musician
- Paul Q. Kolderie – co-founder of Fort Apache Studios; engineer of first Pixies recordings
- Simon Larbalestier – photographer for all Pixies albums
- David Lovering – Pixies drummer
- Shirley Manson – Garbage singer and songwriter
- Gil Norton – producer for Doolittle, Bossanova and Trompe le Monde
- Liz Phair – musician
- Joey Santiago – Pixies guitarist
- Gary Smith – owner/manager of Fort Apache studios; first person to record Pixies
- Charles Thompson – AKA Black Francis/Frank Black; Pixies singer/guitarist/songwriter
- Ivo Watts-Russell – co-founder of 4AD Records
