= Lyle Workman =

American songwriter

- Born: Lyle Dean Workman; San Jose, California, U.S.

Lyle Dean Workman is an American guitarist, composer, session and touring musician, and music producer. His music has been widely distributed since his debut on the eponymous Bourgeois Tagg album in 1986, and is known for his work as composer and bandleader for the Superbad soundtrack.

== As composer ==
Workman is credited as composer for the films Superbad, The 40-Year-Old Virgin, Forgetting Sarah Marshall, Good Boys, The Incredible Burt Wonderstone, Stand Up Guys, Win Win, Get Him to the Greek, Yes Man, Knocked Up (additional music), Overboard (2018), Bad Santa 2, American Reunion, 21 & Over, The Goods, The Interview (additional music), and the Jon Favreau films Made and Chef (additional music). His work on the Superbad soundtrack has earned critical acclaim. He has contributed on guitar and other instruments on several other soundtracks.

For TV, he has written the music for the Judd Apatow-produced shows Love and Crashing. Other shows include The Bold Type, Sun Records, and Good Girls.

== Collaborations ==
In 1992-1993 Workman was recruited to play guitar (along with Jon Brion) on Jellyfish's critically acclaimed second album Spilt Milk.

Workman is also known to Todd Rundgren fans as the lead guitarist on Rundgren's albums Nearly Human and 2nd Wind, as well as his 1989-90 tour in support of the former. Beck's live audiences saw Workman perform as the lead guitarist on his Midnight Vultures tours from 1999 to 2001, and Workman toured with Sting on 2006's Broken Music Tour, and performed with him at Live 8.

Lyle Workman is also known for collaborating with Chad Fischer, the frontman of the American alternative rock band Lazlo Bane. Workman has co-written with Fischer two songs, "Buttercup" and "View From The Pavement", and played guitar on the band's debut album 11 Transistor. Later, Workman collaborated with Fischer again, co-writing and performing the song "Miserable Life" for the film Little Manhattan.

He has also worked extensively with Frank Black recording and touring, appearing on the records Teenager of the Year, The Cult of Ray, Frank Black and The Catholics, and Oddballs and is credited with "arranged by" credit on several songs on 2006's Fast Man Raider Man.

Lyle has worked as a studio musician in Los Angeles on many rock and pop albums with artists Sting, Michael Buble, Sarah McLachlan, Ziggy Marley, Norah Jones, Bryan Adams, Sheryl Crow, Shakira, and They Might Be Giants, to name a few.

As a producer, Workman is credited on Dutch singer 'Ilse DeLange's record Incredible which, in the Netherlands, featured several number-one singles and multi-platinum sales. Workman produced DeLange's record "Next To Me" released in September 2010.

== Solo work ==
Workman released his first instrumental "solo" album, Purple Passages, in 1996, and was well reviewed among musicians with XTC's Dave Gregory calling Workman "a musician of consummate skill, creativity and taste". His second solo album, Tabula Rasa (2001), has also received rave reviews. "Harmonic Crusader" was released in 2009, followed in 2021 by "Uncommon Measures."

== Bourgeois Tagg ==
In the mid 1980s, Workman was a guitarist for the pop-rock band Bourgeois Tagg. In 1987, the band recorded the album Yoyo with esteemed producer Todd Rundgren. When it was released in the autumn of that year, the band had what would prove to be their biggest hit with its first single "I Don't Mind at All," written by Workman and band co-founder Brent Bourgeois, which peaked at number 38 on the Billboard Hot 100. A shimmering, melancholy ballad of resignation, the song's catchy melody, offbeat rhythm, and dramatic use of strings has been said by English music critic James Masterton to have "its heart and soul firmly in the 1960s" and to be reminiscent of classic Beatles songs such as "Yesterday" and "Across the Universe". The single also charted in the U.S. at number five on the Adult Contemporary chart and number 8 on the Album Rock Tracks chart. It was a hit worldwide too charting number 35 on Canada's RPM singles chart, number 35 on UK's Official Charts and number 83 in Netherlands. Its success was fueled by an innovative video directed by David Fincher that received heavy airplay on MTV and other music video outlets.

== Collaborations ==
- Teenager of the Year - Frank Black (1994)
- The Cult of Ray - Frank Black (1996)
- Angelica - Angelica (1997)
- Frank Black and the Catholics - Frank Black (1998)
- C'mon, C'mon - Sheryl Crow (2002)
- Devil's Workshop - Frank Black (2002)
- To Whom It May Concern - Lisa Marie Presley (2003)
- Fijación Oral, Vol. 1 - Shakira (2005)
- Scream - Sam Bettens (2005)
- Now What - Lisa Marie Presley (2005)
- Fires - Nerina Pallot (2005)
- Oral Fixation, Vol. 2 - Shakira (2005)
- The Great Escape - Ilse DeLange (2006)
- Fast Man Raider Man - Frank Black (2006)
- Life in Cartoon Motion - Mika (2007)
- This Moment - Steven Curtis Chapman (2007)
- Little Voice - Sara Bareilles (2007)
- Incredible - Ilse DeLange (2008)
- The Boy Who Knew Too Much - Mika (2009)
- The Fall - Norah Jones (2009)
- Next to Me - Ilse DeLange (2010)
- Christmas - Michael Bublé (2011)
- Havoc and Bright Lights - Alanis Morissette (2012)
- Covered - Katey Sagal (2013)
- To Be Loved - Michael Bublé (2013)
- Fly Rasta - Ziggy Marley (2014)
- Resurrection - Anastacia (2014)
- Shine On - Sarah McLachlan (2014)
- The Great Unknown - Rob Thomas (2015)
- 57th & 9th - Sting (2016)
- Ziggy Marley - Ziggy Marley (2016)
- Shine a Light - Bryan Adams (2019)
