= Devil's Workshop =

Studio album by Frank Black and the Catholics
- Released: August 20, 2002
- Recorded: March–April 2002
- Studio: Frank Black and the Catholics' mobile recording studio, Los Angeles
- Genre: Alternative rock
- Length: 33:10
- Label: SpinART (US); Cooking Vinyl (Europe)
- Producer: Frank Black and the Catholics; Ben Mumphrey

Frank Black and the Catholics chronology
Black Letter Days (2002)	Devil's Workshop (2002)	Show Me Your Tears (2003)

Professional ratings
Aggregate scores
Source	Rating
Metacritic	60/100
Review scores
Source	Rating
AllMusic	3/5 stars
Alternative Press	6/10
Encyclopedia of Popular Music	3/5 stars
The Guardian	2/5 stars
Pitchfork	6.9/10
Q	2/5 stars
Rolling Stone	2/5 stars
The Rolling Stone Album Guide	3.5/5 stars
Stylus Magazine	C−
Uncut	2.5/5 stars

Devil's Workshop is the second of a pair of albums by Frank Black and the Catholics to be simultaneously released on August 20, 2002 (along with Black Letter Days). "His Kingly Cave" was originally recorded for an aborted album project in mid-2000 entitled Sunday Sunny Mill Valley Groove Day. "Velvety"'s music comes from an earlier Pixies B-side, appropriately named "Velvety Instrumental Version". The track first received lyrics when it was revived for this album.

== Background ==
In 2002, Frank Black talked to the Free Williamsburg website about some of the songs on Devil's Workshop. "Velvety" was written by Black as a teenager and was called "Velvety Instrumental Version" because at the time he thought it sounded like the Velvet Underground, "which, of course, it doesn't, in hindsight," he said. "We had started to play it when we were touring on Dog in the Sand, just the instrumental version. It was a loud, open the set, "Hello! We're here!" kind of rave-up. It was kind of around. One day I had a session, and I didn't have a new song to present to the band and I said "Okay, I'm gonna write some lyrics to this song." As a matter of fact, that was the first thing we recorded for Devil's Workshop, I believe, on the first day."

"His Kingly Cave" is about a trip to Graceland many years before. Black: "I thought it would be fun to take hallucinogenic mushrooms while I was there. I was much younger than I am now. ... I went to Graceland with my girlfriend and we took mushrooms and it was a horrible and tense day. That's a telling of that day in that story."

== Track listing ==
All tracks written by Frank Black.

1. "Velvety" – 2:28
2. "Out of State" – 2:29
3. "His Kingly Cave" – 4:44
4. "San Antonio, TX" – 3:43
5. "Bartholomew" – 2:26
6. "Modern Age" – 2:55
7. "Are You Headed My Way?" – 2:03
8. "Heloise" – 3:42
9. "The Scene" – 2:29
10. "Whiskey in Your Shoes" – 3:06
11. "Fields of Marigold" – 3:05

== Personnel ==
Frank Black and the Catholics

- Frank Black – vocals, guitar
- Scott Boutier – drums
- David McCaffery – bass, vocals
- Dave Philips – guitar, pedal steel guitar, vocals

Additional musicians

- Joey Santiago – guitar
- Lyle Workman – guitar
- Moris Tepper – guitar
- Rob Laufer – keyboards
- Eric Drew Feldman – keyboards
- Stan Ridgway – keyboards
- Ben Mumphrey – maracas

Technical

- Frank Black and the Catholics – producer
- Ben Mumphrey – producer, engineer
- Robert Vosgien – mastering
- AlphaBeta – cover design
