= Grand Duchy (band) =

American rock band

Grand Duchy is an American alternative/electronic/art rock band formed in 2008 by Black Francis (also known as Frank Black), the frontman of the Pixies, and his then-wife, musician Violet Clark. The duo blends elements of alternative rock, new wave, and electronic music, characterized by shared vocals and a mix of vintage and modern sounds. Their debut album, Petits Fours, was released in 2009 to generally positive reviews, showcasing a departure from Francis's previous work with a more experimental and synth-driven style.

== Discography ==
- Lovesick (2009)
  1. "Lovesick"
  2. "Vapors"
  3. "The Timbers"
- Petits Fours (2009)
  1. "Come On Over To My House" – 2:45
  2. "Lovesick" – 3:52
  3. "Fort Wayne" – 4:37
  4. "Seeing Stars" – 3:29
  5. "Black Suit" – 4:30
  6. "The Long Song" – 5:16
  7. "Break the Angels" – 5:18
  8. "Ermesinde" – 4:04
  9. "Volcano!" – 3:36
  10. "Donnez-moi" - 3:34 (bonus track)
  11. "Ma Carrefour" - 5:15 (bonus track)
  12. "Beg" - 4:07 (bonus track)
- Let the People Speak (2012)
  1. "The Lopsided World of L" – 0:23
  2. "See-Thru You" – 4:24
  3. "White Out" – 5:07
  4. "Where Is John Frum?" – 3:33
  5. "Geode" – 5:40
  6. "Shady" – 3:21
  7. "Annie Bliss" – 3:35
  8. "Dark Sparkles and the Beat" – 6:56
  9. "Two Lies and One Truth" – 2:50
  10. "Silver Boys" – 5:31
  11. "Illiterate Lovers" – 4:04
  12. "Face" – 6:37
  13. "Esther" – 3:53
  14. "ROTC" – 4:10
  15. "Let the People Speak" – 4:39

== Other collaborations ==
In 2008, Grand Duchy covered the song "A Strange Day" by the British band The Cure in a tribute album entitled Just Like Heaven.
