= Svn Fngrs =

EP by Black Francis
- Released: March 2008
- Studios: Sprout City Studios, Eugene, Oregon; Wavelength Studios, Salem, Oregon
- Genre: Alternative rock
- Length: 20:14
- Label: Cooking Vinyl
- Producer: Jason Carter

Black Francis chronology
Bluefinger (2007)	Svn Fngrs (2008)	The Golem (2010)

Professional ratings
Review scores
Source	Rating
AllMusic	4/5 stars
Drowned in Sound	7/10
Pitchfork	6.8/10
Popmatters	7/10 stars

Svn Fngrs is a mini-album by Black Francis (a.k.a. Frank Black), released on March 3, 2008 by Cooking Vinyl. The album's title is a reference to the Irish mythological hero Cúchulainn, who was said to have seven fingers and seven toes. The songs "Seven Fingers" and "When They Come to Murder Me" also feature lyrics written from Cúchulainn's point of view.

== Track listing ==
All tracks are written by Black Francis.

No.	Title	Length
1.	"The Seus"	3:42
2.	"Garbage Heap"	2:50
3.	"Half Man"	2:33
4.	"I Sent Away"	2:03
5.	"Seven Fingers"	1:46
6.	"The Tale of Lonesome Fetter"	3:56
7.	"When They Come to Murder Me"	3:24

== Personnel ==
Credits adapted from the album's liner notes.

- Black Francis – vocals, guitar, harmonica
- Jason Carter – drums, percussion, producer, engineer, mixing, mastering
- Violet Clark – bass
- Thaddeus Moore – engineer
- Julian Harkema – artwork, design
- Mark Lemhouse – artwork, design
