= Los Angeles (song) =

Single by Frank Black

from the album Frank Black
- A-side: "Los Angeles"
- B-side: "I Heard Ramona Sing"
- Released: March 9, 1993
- Genre: Alternative rock
- Length: 4:08
- Label: 4AD/Elektra
- Songwriter: Frank Black
- Producers: Eric Drew Feldman, Black Francis

Frank Black singles chronology
"Los Angeles" (1993)	"Hang On to Your Ego" (1993)

"Los Angeles" is the debut solo single written and performed by Frank Black. It was the first track on his solo debut album Frank Black, released in 1993. It served as the main theme song for the short lived but cult favorite VH1 talk show Late World with Zach. It was also featured in the soundtrack of Tony Hawk's American Wasteland as well as in Girl Skateboards' 2003 video Yeah Right!, in which the song played during Eric Koston's video part.

A music video was made for the song featuring Black himself. The music video was featured on an episode of MTV's Beavis and Butt-head, and was directed by John Flansburgh of They Might Be Giants.

== Composition ==
The song starts off with an acoustic guitar introduction. An electric guitar riff is heard after that. With an interlude back into acoustic guitar music, it ends with helicopter noises.

Asked about the lyrical inspiration, Black said, "Well, mostly I had to get it done as someone from 4AD was flying in the next day to listen. It's loosely a sci-fi poem with a kind of Blade Runner outlook, i.e., futuristic Los Angeles."
