= Frank Black (album) =

Studio album by Frank Black
- Released: March 8, 1993
- Recorded: 1992
- Studios: The Clubhouse (Burbank, California); Master Control (Burbank, California)
- Genre: Alternative rock
- Length: 46:29
- Labels: 4AD; Elektra
- Producers: Eric Drew Feldman; Frank Black

Frank Black chronology
Frank Black (1993)	Teenager of the Year (1994)

Singles from Frank Black
- 1. "Los Angeles" Released: March 9, 1993; 2. "Hang On to Your Ego" Released: 1993

Frank Black is the debut solo album by American alternative rock musician Frank Black. The album was recorded in 1992 and released on March 8, 1993, via 4AD and Elektra Records, after the breakup of Black's band Pixies.

The album is similar in style, both musically and lyrically, to the Pixies' last album prior to their 1993 breakup, Trompe le Monde. Frank Black is characterized by a focus on UFOs and science fiction. Two singles from the album—"Los Angeles" and "Hang On to Your Ego"—were released in 1993; both reached the top ten of Billboard's Modern Rock Tracks chart.

The song "I Heard Ramona Sing" is featured in the 2010 film Scott Pilgrim vs. the World, as well as its soundtrack.

== Recording and production ==
While the Pixies' 1991 album Trompe le Monde was being recorded, Black, known as Black Francis at the time, had discussions with the album's producer, Gil Norton, about a possible solo record. He told Norton he was keen to record again, even though he had no new material; as a result, the two decided on a covers album. However, by the time Francis visited a recording studio again in 1992, he had "plenty of tunes and musical scraps".

He collaborated with Eric Drew Feldman of Pere Ubu to record new material; they began by trimming down the number of covers to one, the Beach Boys' "Hang On to Your Ego". Feldman became the album's producer, and played keyboard and bass guitar on several songs, with former Pixies guitarist Joey Santiago on lead guitar. Francis recorded the album during the hiatus and breakup of the Pixies in late 1992 and early 1993. He then adopted the stage name "Frank Black" (inverting his old persona "Black Francis") and released the results as Frank Black in March 1993.

== Music ==
"Los Angeles"
A sample of "Los Angeles"

Frank Black is characterized by a lyrical focus on UFOs and science fiction, although he explored other eclectic subjects, such as in "I Heard Ramona Sing", a song about the Ramones. The album is similar in style, both musically and lyrically, to the Pixies' albums Bossanova and Trompe le Monde. Feldman later said that the first record connected his solo career with Trompe le Monde, "but at the same time it is an island, like nothing else he [Black] did".

== Critical reception ==
Professional ratings
Review scores
Source	Rating
AllMusic	4.5/5 stars
Chicago Tribune	3/4 stars
The Encyclopedia of Popular Music	3/5 stars
Entertainment Weekly	B−
Los Angeles Times	3.5/4 stars
NME	5/10
Q	4/5 stars
Rolling Stone	4/5 stars
Select	5/5
Spin Alternative Record Guide	8/10

The New York Times wrote: "Thompson has memorized the unabridged punk-rock songbook from the Rolling Stones onward. In his hands, though, aggressive, malevolent underpinnings take on a bleak cheeriness as he rambles on about seedy seaports and science-fiction conventions and turns himself into a maniacal soda jerk and a fallen czar." The Indianapolis Star noted that "the full, grinding punk/surf/sci-fi kick of the Pixies is missing from his first solo album, [but] Frank Black has the essential cryptic lyrics, peripatetic rhythms and pop sensibility."

In 2024, The Independent ranked Frank Black number six on their list of the 20 most underrated albums ever.

== Track listing ==
All tracks are written by Frank Black, except where noted.

No.	Title	Writer(s)	Length
1.	"Los Angeles"		4:08
2.	"I Heard Ramona Sing"		3:40
3.	"Hang On to Your Ego"	Brian Wilson; Terry Sachen (Note: Erroneously credited to Brian Wilson and Tony Asher in album sleeve)	3:24
4.	"Fu Manchu"		3:02
5.	"Places Named After Numbers"		2:52
6.	"Czar"		2:42
7.	"Old Black Dawning"		2:02
8.	"Ten Percenter"		3:28
9.	"Brackish Boy"		1:35
10.	"Two Spaces"		2:25
11.	"Tossed" (instrumental version)		4:09
12.	"Parry the Wind High, Low"		4:32
13.	"Adda Lee"		2:00
14.	"Every Time I Go Around Here"		3:31
15.	"Don't Ya Rile 'Em"		2:52

== Personnel ==
- Frank Black – vocals, guitar
- Eric Drew Feldman – bass, keyboards, synthetics
- Nick Vincent – drums, percussion

Additional musicians

- Joey Santiago – additional guitar
- Dave Sardy – additional guitar
- Jeff Moris Tepper – additional guitar
- Bob Giusti – additional drums
- John Linnell – saxophone
- Kurt Hoffman – saxophone

Technical personnel

- Alistair Clay – engineer, mixing
- Efren Herrera – second engineer
- Matt Packuko – second engineer
- Sean Leonard – second engineer
- Wally Traugott – mastering
- Chris Bigg – design
- Vaughan Oliver – design
- Simon Larbalestier – artwork photography
- Michael Halsband – portrait photography

== Charts ==
Chart (1993)	Peak position
Canada Top Albums/CDs (RPM)ERROR in "Canada": Missing parameters: chartid.	57
Dutch Albums (Album Top 100)	34
German Albums (Offizielle Top 100)	83
New Zealand Albums (RMNZ)	14
UK Albums (Official Charts)	9
US Billboard 200	117
US Heatseekers Albums (Billboard)	2

== Bibliography ==
- Frank, Josh; Ganz, Caryn (2005). Fool the World: The Oral History of a Band Called Pixies. Virgin Books. ISBN 0-312-34007-9.
