= Bluefinger =

Studio album by Black Francis
- Released: September 2007
- Recorded: September 2006
- Studios: Sprout City Studios, Eugene, Oregon; Wavelength Studios, Salem, Oregon
- Genre: Alternative rock
- Length: 39:11
- Label: Cooking Vinyl
- Producer: Mark Lemhouse

Frank Black chronology
| Frank Black 93–03 (2007) | Bluefinger (2007) | Svn Fngrs (2008) |

Professional ratings
Aggregate scores
| Source | Rating |
|---|---|
| Metacritic | 73/100 |
Review scores
| Source | Rating |
| AllMusic | 3.5/5 stars |
| The A.V. Club | B |
| NME | 7/10 |
| Mojo | 4/5 stars |
| Magnet | 4/5 stars |
| Paste | 3.5/5 stars |
| Pitchfork | 6.6/10 |
| Q | 3/5 stars |
| Uncut | 3/5 stars |
| Under the Radar | 6/10 stars |

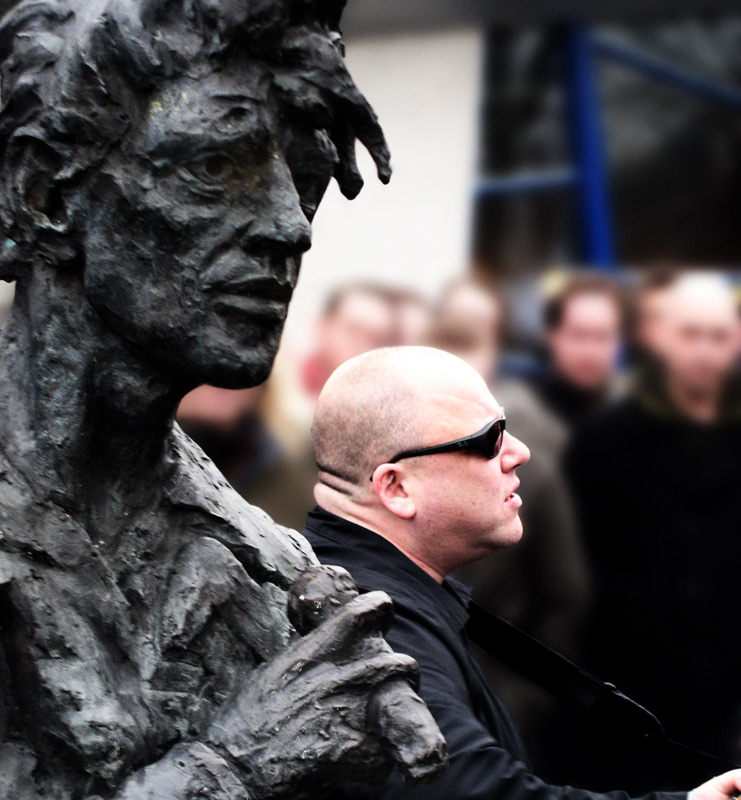
Black Francis pays a tribute to Herman Brood near his statue in Zwolle, Netherlands on February 29, 2008

Bluefinger is an album by Black Francis. The album was released on 11 September 2007 in the United States and Europe. The project was revealed via several cryptic posts by Black on his unofficial website, which were confirmed as accurate when the album leaked to file-sharing services earlier in the year.

All of the songs on the album reference Dutch musician and artist Herman Brood (1946-2001), some directly and some indirectly. In addition, "You Can't Break a Heart and Have It" is a Brood cover. The title of the album, Bluefinger, is also a direct reference to the birthplace of Brood, who was born in the Dutch city of Zwolle, of which the citizens are colloquially known as Blauwvingers (Bluefingers).

The song "Threshold Apprehension" was #90 on Rolling Stone's list of the 100 Best Songs of 2007.

"You Can't Break a Heart and Have It" was included in the soundtrack for Forgetting Sarah Marshall.

In 2010, Bluefinger was adapted into a play/rock opera by Jason Nodler, for Houston's acclaimed Catastrophic Theatre.

== Track listing ==
All tracks are written by Black Francis, except where noted.

| No. | Title | Writer(s) | Length |
|---|---|---|---|
| 1. | "Captain Pasty" | | 2:23 |
| 2. | "Threshold Apprehension" | | 5:12 |
| 3. | "Test Pilot Blues" | | 2:55 |
| 4. | "Lolita" | | 2:59 |
| 5. | "Tight Black Rubber" | | 4:17 |
| 6. | "Angels Come to Comfort You" | | 4:25 |
| 7. | "Your Mouth Into Mine" | | 3:41 |
| 8. | "Discotheque 36" | | 4:40 |
| 9. | "You Can't Break a Heart and Have It" | Herman Brood | 2:36 |
| 10. | "She Took All the Money" | | 2:30 |
| 11. | "Bluefinger" | | 3:29 |

iTunes bonus tracks
| No. | Title | Length |
|---|---|---|
| 12. | "Polly's Into Me" | 4:43 |
| 13. | "Virginia Reel" | 4:44 |

== Personnel ==
Credits adapted from the album's liner notes.

Musicians

- Black Francis – vocals, guitar, harmonica, keyboards
- Dan Schmid – bass
- Jason Carter – drums
- Violet Clark – vocals
- Mark Lemhouse – percussion, background vocals

Technical

- Mark Lemhouse – producer
- Thaddeus Moore – engineer
- Jason Carter – engineer, mixing
- Myles Mangino – mastering, mixing
- James Jefferson – design
- Julian Clark - artwork
- Richard Hermitage – management
