= Frank Black Francis =

Studio album by Frank Black
- Released: October 12, 2004
- Recorded: March 1987, Boston; Summer 2003, London (Pixies-era recordings)
- Genre: Alternative rock
- Length: 84:54
- Label: SpinART; Cooking Vinyl
- Producer: Two Pale Boys (Andy Diagram and Keith Moliné) on disc two

Frank Black chronology
Show Me Your Tears (2003)	Frank Black Francis (2004)	Honeycomb (2005)

Professional ratings
Aggregate scores
Source	Rating
Metacritic	69/100
Review scores
Source	Rating
Allmusic	4/5 stars
Drowned in Sound	8/10
Encyclopedia of Popular Music	3/5 stars
Entertainment Weekly	B+
Mojo	4/5 stars
NME	8/10
Pitchfork	7.4/10
Q	2/5 stars
Uncut	4/5 stars
Under the Radar	6/10 stars

Frank Black Francis is a 2-CD set released in 2004 by Frank Black, roughly coinciding with the Pixies reunion tour. Disc 1 consists of a March 1987 solo acoustic demo tape recorded by engineer Gary Smith, just prior to the first Pixies recording session. Disc 2 is a contemporary recording from 2003 of Frank Black reworking a number of Pixies songs with Keith Moliné and Andy Diagram, who are part of David Thomas and Two Pale Boys.

== Track listing ==
All tracks composed by Black Francis

Disc one {Black Francis demos}

1. "The Holiday Song" – 1:54
2. "I'm Amazed" – 1:25
3. "Rock a My Soul" – 1:50
4. "Isla de Encanta" – 1:39
5. "Caribou" – 3:00
6. "Broken Face" – 1:21
7. "Build High" – 1:26
8. "Nimrod's Son" – 2:08
9. "Ed Is Dead" – 2:45
10. "Subbacultcha" – 2:45
11. "Boom Chickaboom" – 2:33
12. "I've Been Tired" – 3:10
13. "Break My Body" – 1:55
14. "Oh My Golly!" – 1:59
15. "Vamos" – 2:14

Disc two {treated}

1. "Caribou" – 3:09
2. "Where Is My Mind?" – 3:41
3. "Cactus" – 2:41
4. "Nimrod's Son" – 3:01
5. "Levitate Me" – 2:01
6. "Wave of Mutilation" – 2:25
7. "Monkey Gone to Heaven" – 3:49
8. "Velouria" – 4:35
9. "The Holiday Song" – 2:21
10. "Into the White" – 3:24
11. "Is She Weird?" – 3:51
12. "Subbacultcha" – 2:56
13. "Planet of Sound" – 14:56

== Personnel ==
Credits adapted from the album's liner notes.

- Black Francis - vocals, acoustic guitar
- Keith Moliné - guitar, violin, electronics (disc two)
- Andy Diagram - trumpet, electronics (disc two)

Technical

- Gary Smith - recorded by (disc one)
- Andy Diagram - producer (disc two)
- Keith Moliné - producer (disc two)
- Joey Santiago - additional editing
- Myles Mangino - mastering
- Jean Thompson - cover concept
- Andrew Swainson - cover design
- Black Francis - cover photography, additional photography
- Ken Goes - additional photography
