= Frank Black and the Catholics (album) =

Studio album by Frank Black and the Catholics
- Released: September 9, 1998
- Recorded: March 20–22, 1997
- Studio: Sound City Studios, Los Angeles, California
- Genre: Alternative rock
- Length: 41:19
- Label: SpinART
- Producer: Frank Black and the Catholics

Frank Black chronology
The Cult of Ray (1996)	Frank Black and the Catholics (1998)	Pistolero (1999)

Frank Black and the Catholics is the debut album from Frank Black and the Catholics, released in 1998. The backing group on this album performed on Black's previous album, The Cult of Ray, but the group name was first adopted on this release. The album was recorded live to two-track tape over the course of three days in 1997, but a protracted dispute with Black's label American Recordings, reportedly over the "raw" sound of the recordings, delayed its release for 18 months. The album was released in June 1998 in the MP3 format on GoodNoise.com (precursor to eMusic) and was the first album by a major artist to be commercially released on the Internet. The album was then released in the fall of 1998 by SpinART records in the US. During the interim, Lyle Workman left the group and was replaced by Rich Gilbert, and Black prepared the follow-up, Pistolero.

Professional ratings
Review scores
Source	Rating
AllMusic	2.5/5 stars
The Encyclopedia of Popular Music	3/5 stars
NME	6/10
Pitchfork	6.8/10
Rolling Stone	3.5/5 stars
The Rolling Stone Album Guide	2/5 stars

== Track listing ==
The track listing is sequenced in alphabetical order.

All tracks are written by Frank Black, except where noted.

No.	Title	Writer(s)	Length
1.	"All My Ghosts"		3:32
2.	"Back to Rome"		3:25
3.	"Do You Feel Bad About It?"		2:07
4.	"Dog Gone"		3:00
5.	"I Gotta Move"		3:37
6.	"I Need Peace"		5:12
7.	"King & Queen of Siam"		2:51
8.	"Six-Sixty-Six"	Larry Norman	3:03
9.	"Solid Gold"		4:18
10.	"Steak 'n' Sabre"		3:47
11.	"Suffering"		2:58
12.	"The Man Who Was Too Loud"		3:31

- Track No. 8, "Six-Sixty-Six", is a cover of a song by Larry Norman that originally appeared on the 1976 album In Another Land. Frank Black had long admired Norman, naming the first Pixies album, Come On Pilgrim, after a line in a Norman song. The two were introduced by Bono at a U2 concert and developed a relationship.

== Personnel ==
Credits adapted from the album's liner notes.

Frank Black and the Catholics

- Frank Black – guitar, vocals
- Scott Boutier – drums
- David McCaffery – bass, vocals
- Lyle Workman – lead guitar

Technical

- Frank Black and the Catholics – producer
- Billy Joe Bowers – recording engineer
- Nick Raskulinecz – assistant engineer
- Eddy Schreyer – mastering engineer
- Inertia – design
