= Show Me Your Tears =

Studio album by Frank Black and the Catholics
- Released: September 8, 2003
- Studio: Frank Black and the Catholics' mobile studio, Los Angeles, California
- Genre: Alternative country
- Length: 41:31
- Label: Cooking Vinyl (UK); SpinART (US)
- Producer: Nick Vincent; Ben Mumphrey; Stan Ridgway; Frank Black and the Catholics

Frank Black chronology
Devil's Workshop (2002)	Show Me Your Tears (2003)	Frank Black Francis (2004)

Professional ratings
Aggregate scores
Source	Rating
Metacritic	71/100
Review scores
Source	Rating
AllMusic	3.5/5 stars
Alternative Press	6/10
Encyclopedia of Popular Music	3/5 stars
Mojo	4/5 stars
Pitchfork	5.4/10
Q	1.5/5 stars
The Rolling Stone Album Guide	3/5 stars
Stylus Magazine	B
Uncut	4/5 stars
Under the Radar	7/10 stars

Show Me Your Tears is the sixth and final studio album to be released to date by Frank Black and the Catholics. Released in September 2003 by SpinART in the US and Cooking Vinyl in the UK, the album employs a wide range of guests, including piano and an arrangement by Van Dyke Parks on the final track, "Manitoba". Within months of the album's release, it was announced that Black would be participating in a Pixies reunion, and since that time, the Catholics have effectively been defunct.

== Recording ==
Black said, "We’d been playing together a long time, ten years of hard touring and loading our own gear and not making a lotta money out of it, and we’re hittin’ the mid-life crisis. And they're all getting mad at me ‘cause I’m forcing them to record live to two-track for the umpteenth time."

== Track listing ==
All tracks written by Frank Black.

1. "Nadine" – 3:05
2. "Everything Is New" – 3:51
3. "My Favorite Kiss" – 2:06
4. "Jaina Blues" – 3:51
5. "New House of the Pope" – 3:15
6. "Horrible Day" – 3:37
7. "Massif Centrale" – 4:52
8. "When Will Happiness Find Me Again?" – 2:19
9. "Goodbye Lorraine" – 2:37
10. "This Old Heartache" – 3:27
11. "The Snake" – 2:01
12. "Coastline" – 1:57
13. "Manitoba" – 4:33

== Personnel ==
Credits adapted from the album's liner notes.

Frank Black and the Catholics

- Frank Black – vocals, guitar
- Scott Boutier – drums, bells
- Rich Gilbert – guitar, piano, pedal steel guitar, vocals
- David McCaffrey – bass, vocals
- David Philips – guitar, pedal steel guitar, vocals

Additional musicians

- Joey Santiago – guitar
- Keith Moliné – guitar
- Stan Ridgway – harmonica, melodica, banjo, percussion, vocals
- Eric Drew Feldman – organ
- Van Dyke Parks – piano, accordion
- Rob Laufer – piano, vocals
- Jack Kidney – saxophone, harmonica
- Andy J. Perkins – trumpet
- Cynthia Haagens – vocals
- Eric Potter – vocals
- Jean Black – vocals
- Pietra Wexstun – vocals

Technical

- Nick Vincent – producer (tracks 1, 2, 5–8, 11)
- Stan Ridgway – producer (tracks 3, 9, 10, 12, 13), cover and booklet photos
- Ben Mumphrey – producer (track 4), engineer
- Frank Black and the Catholics – producer (track 4)
- Miles Wilson – assistant engineer
- Paul Figueroa – assistant engineer
- Phillip Broussard – assistant engineer
- Eddy Schreyer – mastering
- Jean Black – cover design
- Mark Husmann – band photos
