= Duane Jarvis =

American guitarist and singer-songwriter

Duane Jarvis (August 22, 1957 – April 1, 2009) was an American guitarist and singer-songwriter who recorded, wrote songs and toured with many rock and roll and country music performers, including Frank Black, Peter Case, Rosie Flores, John Prine, Amy Rigby, Lucinda Williams, Dwight Yoakam, Tim Carroll, and Gene Clark & Carla Olson.

His collaborations included co-writing "Still I Long For Your Kiss" with Wiliams, a song on her Grammy-winning album Car Wheels on a Gravel Road. He also released a number of solo albums.

He described his style as "country rock by way of the British Invasion" in a 1994 interview with The Oregonian, citing The Who, The Kinks, and The Rolling Stones as influences who themselves had borrowed much from roots music.

== Personal life ==
Jarvis was born in Astoria, Oregon, and grew up in California, Oregon and Washington. His mother was a nurse and his father was in the United States Coast Guard, and would often play country music records at home. While living in Florida as a pre-teen, Jarvis received a guitar pick from B. B. King at the end of a concert he attended, which Jarvis kept for the rest of his life. He was part of a blues band and a power pop group while in his teens. He later played guitars, sang and wrote songs in the Portland power pop band 2 Minutes 50 (originally called The Odds), who released a 7-inch single, "Call Me Back"/"Forget It", in 1981.

Jarvis was inducted into the Oregon Music Hall of Fame in 2007. He died of colon cancer at age 51 on April 1, 2009, at his home in Marina del Rey, California.

== Discography ==
=== Studio albums ===
- D.J.'s Front Porch (Twin/Tone-Medium Cool), February 22, 1994
- Far From Perfect (Watermelon Records), February 24, 1998
- Combo Platter (Glitterhouse), 1999 – Compilation of non-album, live and studio tracks
- Certified Miracle (Slewfoot), July 31, 2001
- Delicious (Slewfoot), December 23, 2003

=== Compilations ===
- "Cocktail Napkin" on Nashville: The Other Side Of The Alley... Vol. 3 (Bloodshot Records, 1996)
- "Broken A/C Blues" on Down To The Promised Land: 5 Years Of Bloodshot Records (2000)
- "Squeaky Wheel" on Freight Train Boogie: A Collection of Americana Music (The Orchard, 2001)
- "There Is a Light" on The Rookie original soundtrack album (Hollywood Records, 2002)
- "New Madrid" (with Dave Coleman) on For Anyone That's Listening: A Tribute to Uncle Tupelo (Flat Earth Records. 2003)
- "Cupid Must Be Angry" on Lowe Profile: A Tribute to Nick Lowe (Brewery Records, 2005)

=== Other credits ===
- "Still I Long for Your Kiss" (cowr.) on Lucinda Williams, Car Wheels on a Gravel Road (1998)
- "A Girl That's Hip" (cowr.) performed by Tim Carroll, on Drop Dead Gorgeous original soundtrack (1999); and (as "Girl That's Hip") on Tim Carroll, Not for Sale (self-released 2000, re-released 2009)
- Guitar on Lucinda Williams, Sweet Old World (1992)
- Guitar on Greg Trooper, Everywhere (1992) (album)
- Guitar on Greg Trooper, Popular Demons (1998) (album)
- "Sold on You" (cowr., guitarist on album) on Rosie Flores, After the Farm (1992)
- Guitar and mandolin on Gene Clark/Carla Olson, Silhouetted in Light (1992) – reissued as In Concert
- Bass on John Prine, A John Prine Christmas (1994)
- Guitar, coproduction on David Childers, Hard Time County (1999) and A Good Way to Die (2001)
- Producer, guitar and mandolin on Danny Baseheart EP Hell Raisin’ Star Gazin'/Good Ole' Fashioned Evil (2002)
- Lead guitar on Amy Rigby, 'Til the Wheels Fall Off, on title track performed by Amy Rigby with Todd Snider (2003)
- Guitar on Ellis Hooks, The Hand of God (2003)
- Guitar on David Andrews, Everything to Lose (2004)
- Guitar on Frank Black, Fast Man Raider Man (2006)
- Guitar on Peter Case, Let Us Now Praise Sleepy John (2007)
- Guitars and background vocals on Matt Keating, Quixotic (2008)
- Dobro on Greg Koons and the Misbegotten, Nowhere Motel (June 23, 2009)
- Guitar on Black Francis, The Golem (2010, recorded 2008)
