= Teenager of the Year (album) =

Studio album by Frank Black
- Released: May 20, 1994
- Studios: American Recording Co. (Calabasas, California); Castle Oaks (Calabasas, California); The Clubhouse (Burbank, California); The Chapel (Los Angeles, California); Can-Am (Los Angeles, California)
- Genres: Alternative rock; nerd rock
- Length: 62:51
- Labels: 4AD; Elektra
- Producers: Eric Drew Feldman; Frank Black; Alistair Clay

Frank Black chronology
| Frank Black (1993) | Teenager of the Year (1994) | The Cult of Ray (1996) |

Singles from Teenager of the Year
- 1. "Headache" Released: 1994

Professional ratings
Review scores
| Source | Rating |
|---|---|
| AllMusic | 4.5/5 stars |
| Chicago Tribune | 2.5/4 stars |
| The Encyclopedia of Popular Music | 4/5 stars |
| Entertainment Weekly | A− |
| Mojo | 4/5 stars |
| NME | 8/10 |
| Pitchfork | 8.5/10 |
| Rolling Stone | 4/5 stars |
| The Rolling Stone Album Guide | 3.5/5 stars |
| Select | 4/5 |
| Spin Alternative Record Guide | 8/10 |

"Freedom Rock"
A sample of "Freedom Rock"

Teenager of the Year is the second solo studio album by American musician Frank Black. The album was released in 1994 by 4AD in the United Kingdom and Elektra Records in the United States. It was co-produced by Eric Drew Feldman, who also played keyboards and bass guitar on the album. Teenager also features work by several backing musicians, including Lyle Workman, Nick Vincent, Moris Tepper and Black's Pixies bandmate Joey Santiago.

The album reached No. 2 on Billboard's Heatseekers chart and No. 131 on the Billboard 200 chart in 1994. The single "Headache" reached No. 10 on Billboard's Modern Rock Tracks chart that year.

Although not originally well-received, the record is now widely praised by both critics and fans. The album is often cited as the high-point of Francis' post-Pixies catalogue, and was ranked No. 94 on Pitchfork's "Top 100 Albums of the 1990s". The album is included in the book "1001 Albums You Must Hear Before You Die".

== Track listing ==
All tracks are written by Frank Black.

| No. | Title | Length |
|---|---|---|
| 1. | "Whatever Happened to Pong?" | 1:34 |
| 2. | "Thalassocracy" | 1:33 |
| 3. | "(I Want to Live on an) Abstract Plain" | 2:17 |
| 4. | "Calistan" | 3:22 |
| 5. | "The Vanishing Spies" | 3:37 |
| 6. | "Speedy Marie" | 3:33 |
| 7. | "Headache" | 2:52 |
| 8. | "Sir Rockaby" | 2:54 |
| 9. | "Freedom Rock" | 4:16 |
| 10. | "Two Reelers" | 3:01 |
| 11. | "Fiddle Riddle" | 3:29 |
| 12. | "Olé Mulholland" | 4:41 |
| 13. | "Fazer Eyes" | 3:36 |
| 14. | "I Could Stay Here Forever" | 2:27 |
| 15. | "The Hostess with the Mostest" | 1:56 |
| 16. | "Superabound" | 3:10 |
| 17. | "Big Red" | 2:41 |
| 18. | "Space Is Gonna Do Me Good" | 2:22 |
| 19. | "White Noise Maker" | 2:42 |
| 20. | "Pure Denizen of the Citizens Band" | 2:20 |
| 21. | "Bad, Wicked World" | 1:57 |
| 22. | "Pie in the Sky" | 2:13 |

== Personnel ==
Musicians

- Frank Black – vocals, guitar
- Eric Drew Feldman – bass, keyboards, synthetics
- Nick Vincent – drums, bass on track 11
- Lyle Workman – lead guitar
- Joey Santiago – lead guitar on tracks 8, 20, 21, 22 and second lead guitar on track 15
- Moris Tepper – lead guitar on tracks 11 and 17

Technical

- Eric Drew Feldman – producer
- Frank Black – producer
- Alistair Clay – producer (except on tracks 3, 7, 17 and 19), engineer
- David Bianco – additional engineer, mixing
- Andy Warwick – additional engineer
- Bill Cooper – additional engineer
- Efren Herrera – additional engineer
- Craig Doubet – assistant engineer
- Danny Alonso – assistant engineer
- Wolfgang Aichholz – assistant engineer
- Mike Aarvold – assistant engineer
- Matt Westfield – assistant engineer
- John Jackson – assistant engineer
- Frank Gryner – assistant engineer
- Wally Traugott – mastering
- V23 – design
- Michael Halsband – photography

== Charts ==
| Chart (1994) | Peak position |
|---|---|
| Australian Albums (ARIA Charts) | 76 |
| Dutch Albums (Album Top 100) | 45 |
| German Albums (Offizielle Top 100) | 60 |
| New Zealand Albums (RMNZ) | 35 |
| UK Albums (Official Charts) | 21 |
| US Billboard 200 | 131 |
| US Heatseekers Albums (Billboard) | 2 |
