= The Cult of Ray =

Studio album by Frank Black
- Released: January 22, 1996
- Studios: Sound City (Van Nuys, California); Record One (Los Angeles, California); A&M (Hollywood, California)
- Genre: Alternative rock
- Length: 41:40
- Label: American
- Producer: Frank Black

Frank Black chronology
Teenager of the Year (1994)	The Cult of Ray (1996)	Frank Black and the Catholics (1998)

Singles from The Cult of Ray
- 1. "Men in Black" Released: 1995; 2. "The Marsist" Released: 1995; 3. "I Don't Want to Hurt You (Every Single Time)" Released: 1996; 4. "You Ain't Me" Released: 1996

Professional ratings
Review scores
Source	Rating
AllMusic	2.5/5 stars
Entertainment Weekly	B+
The Guardian	2/5 stars
Los Angeles Times	2.5/4 stars
NME	4/10
The Philadelphia Inquirer	2.5/4 stars
Pitchfork	5.5/10
Q	3/5 stars
Select	4/5
Spin	4/10

The Cult of Ray is the third solo studio album by American musician Frank Black. Black opted to produce The Cult of Ray himself, after Eric Drew Feldman produced his first two albums.

The album title is a reference to author Ray Bradbury. The album's final song is a tribute to Shazeb Andleeb, who was beaten to death at Narbonne High School in Harbor City, California (a school Black attended), in May 1995.

== Chart performance ==
The Cult of Ray peaked at number 1 on the Billboard Heatseekers chart and number 127 on the Billboard 200 in 1996.

== Track listing ==
All tracks are written by Frank Black.

No.	Title	Length
1.	"The Marsist"	4:11
2.	"Men in Black"	3:03
3.	"Punk Rock City"	3:41
4.	"You Ain't Me"	2:43
5.	"Jesus Was Right"	2:59
6.	"I Don't Want to Hurt You (Every Single Time)"	3:06
7.	"Mosh, Don't Pass the Guy"	3:01
8.	"Kicked in the Taco"	2:27
9.	"The Creature Crawling"	2:53
10.	"The Adventure and the Resolution"	3:02
11.	"Dance War"	2:08
12.	"The Cult of Ray"	3:46
13.	"The Last Stand of Shazeb Andleeb"	4:40

UK limited edition bonus disc
No.	Title	Length
1.	"Village of the Sun"	3:32
2.	"Baby, That's Art"	2:05
3.	"Everybody Got the Beat"	1:51
4.	"Can I Get a Witness"	3:59

== Personnel ==
The core musicians employed on this album would eventually be dubbed the Catholics and would continue as Black's backing group for the following seven years (albeit with a changed line up).

Musicians

- Frank Black – vocals, guitar (right channel)
- Scott Boutier – drums
- David McCaffery – bass
- Lyle Workman – lead guitar (left channel)
- Matt Yelton – backing vocals on "Men in Black", "You Ain't Me", "The Adventure and the Resolution" and "Dance War"
- Nick Vincent – drums and bass on "I Don't Want to Hurt You (Every Single Time)"

Technical

- Frank Black – producer
- Matt Yelton – engineer
- Billy Bowers – assistant engineer
- Greg Fidelman – assistant engineer
- Jim Champagne – assistant engineer
- Eddie Miller – assistant engineer
- Mike Baumgartner – assistant engineer
- Ian MacPherson – assistant engineer
- Andy MacPherson – mixing
- Bob Ludwig – mastering
- Inertia – design

== Charts ==
Chart (1996)	Peak position
Belgian Albums (Ultratop Flanders)	48
Belgian Albums (Ultratop Wallonia)	23
Canada Top Albums/CDs (RPM)	44
Dutch Albums (Album Top 100)	95
German Albums (Offizielle Top 100)	71
Scottish Albums (Official Charts)	41
Swedish Albums (Sverigetopplistan)	25
UK Albums (Official Charts)	39
US Billboard 200	127
US Heatseekers Albums (Billboard)	1
