= Black Letter Days =

Studio album by Frank Black and the Catholics
- Released: August 20, 2002
- Recorded: October 2001 – January 2002
- Studio: Frank Black and the Catholics' mobile recording studio, Los Angeles
- Genre: Alternative rock
- Length: 65:16
- Label: SpinART (US); Cooking Vinyl (Europe)
- Producer: Nick Vincent

Frank Black and the Catholics chronology
Dog in the Sand (2001)	Black Letter Days (2002)	Devil's Workshop (2002)

Professional ratings
Aggregate scores
Source	Rating
Metacritic	60/100
Review scores
Source	Rating
AllMusic	3.5/5 stars
Alternative Press	7/10
Encyclopedia of Popular Music	3/5 stars
The Guardian	3/5 stars
Pitchfork	6.9/10
Q	2/5 stars
Rolling Stone	3/5 stars
The Rolling Stone Album Guide	3/5 stars
Uncut	2.5/5 stars
The Village Voice	(choice cut)

Black Letter Days is the first of two albums by Frank Black and the Catholics simultaneously released in 2002 (along with Devil's Workshop). The title implies the opposite of the term "Red Letter Days" which are holidays – a "black letter day" being all the ordinary days in a given month.

== Background ==
When asked by writer and podcaster Jonathan Ball in 2002 if Black Letter Days and Devil's Workshop were meant to be companion pieces or stand-alone albums, Frank Black said, "Either/or, I guess. You can buy one, you can buy both. I made two records this year, so I'm releasing two records." Black added, "It's two different sections, two different lineups, two different producers. So it's sort of out of deference to some of the people involved. I didn't mix and match, I just kind of left them separate."

Black Letter Days is bookended with two covers of the same Tom Waits song, "The Black Rider". Black explained that he and the band started to play the song on tour and during recording sessions: "We tried a couple of different covers when we were recording, but that was the one that we did the best. Even then, I wasn't happy with the way we were doing it . . . so we started to fool around with it a bit and have some fun, and the result was one reel of tape with probably seven different versions of "The Black Rider," one devolving into the next and getting sillier, so what you hear is the first take and the last take. It wasn't meant to be taken seriously, we're just doing the song because we like it."

== Track listing ==
All tracks composed by Black Francis, except where noted.

1. "The Black Rider" (Tom Waits) – 2:37
2. "California Bound" – 3:24
3. "Chip Away Boy" – 2:57
4. "Cold Heart of Stone" – 3:19
5. "Black Letter Day" – 3:26
6. "Valentine and Garuda" – 3:13
7. "How You Went So Far" – 4:05
8. "End of Miles" – 3:49
9. "1826" – 6:40
10. "The Farewell Bend" – 3:23
11. "Southbound Bevy" – 3:07
12. "I Will Run After You" – 3:58
13. "True Blue" – 1:49
14. "Jane the Queen of Love" – 5:10
15. "Jet Black River" – 1:51
16. "21 Reasons" – 5:40
17. "Whispering Weeds" – 3:39
18. "The Black Rider" (Waits) – 3:09

== Personnel ==
Frank Black and the Catholics

- Frank Black – vocals, guitar
- Scott Boutier – drums
- Eric Drew Feldman – keyboards, synthesizer, additional vocals
- Rich Gilbert – guitar, pedal steel guitar, keyboards, saxophone, additional vocals
- David McCaffery – bass, backing vocals
- Dave Phillips – guitar, pedal steel guitar, additional vocals

Additional musicians

- Moris Tepper – guitar, vocals
- Nick Vincent – maracas

Technical

- Nick Vincent – producer
- Ben Mumphrey – engineer
- Robert Vosgien – mastering
- Sammy Zax – photography
- Butter x 10 – cover design
