= Mark Lemhouse =

American musician

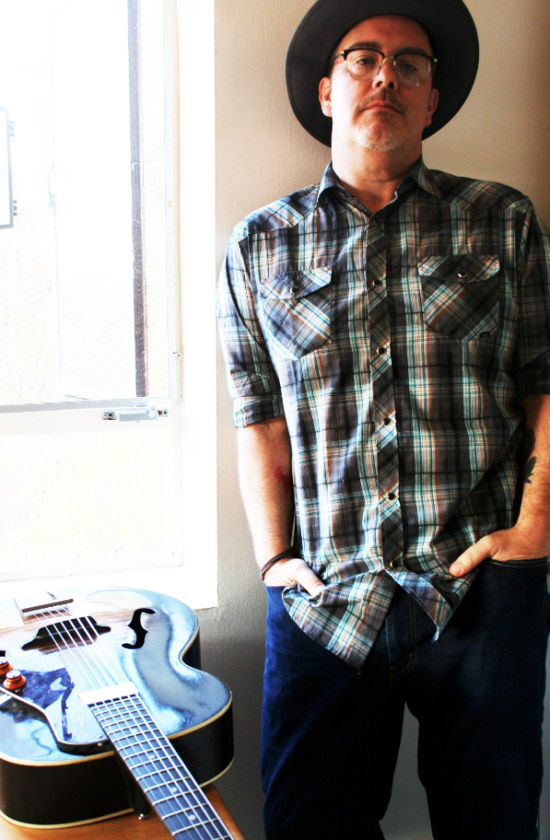

Background information
- Born: Mark Robert Lemhouse
- Origin: Portland, Oregon
- Genres: Americana, Blues, Indie Folk
- Occupations: Songwriter, Singer, Guitarist, Producer
- Instruments: Acoustic guitar, Electric guitar, Lapsteel
- Years active: 2002-present
- Labels: Yellow Dog Records, Bsides Records
- Website: marklemhousemusic.com

Mark Lemhouse is an American singer, songwriter, and guitarist known for releasing critically acclaimed solo albums as well as collaborating with Black Francis of The Pixies serving as producer for the album, Bluefinger. Lemhouse is known to write and perform music that is a combination of influences rooted in blues, old country, and American folk music.

== Biography ==
Lemhouse got his professional start in music in Memphis, Tennessee playing in blues, rockabilly, American roots bands and also as a solo performer. While in Memphis, he released two solo albums on the Yellow Dog Records label. His debut album, Big Lonesome Radio was nominated for two Blues Music Awards for "Best New Artist" and "Acoustic Album of The Year." His song "Edwin's Lament" was used in the Oscar-winning film, Hustle and Flow. The follow-up album, The Great American Yard Sale, was more eclectic in themes than the first, with songs covering subjects from David Bowie to astronauts.

In 2007, Lemhouse produced the album Bluefinger for Alternative Rock musician Black Francis (AKA Frank Black) of The Pixies. Upon the album's release the song "Threshold Apprehension", which Lemhouse also provided backing vocals to, was picked by Rolling Stone magazine as one of the Best 100 Songs of the year.

Lemhouse has toured both the U.S. and Europe, sharing stages with an eclectic group of artists including Jimmie Vaughan, Black Francis, Gary Clark Jr, John Doe, Kelly Joe Phelps, and Lemhouse’s personal hero, Honeyboy Edwards.

== Discography ==
=== Albums (Solo) ===
- 2002 Big Lonesome Radio
- 2005 The Great American Yard Sale
- 2023 Better Days

=== Other projects ===
- 2002 Bluff City Backsliders Bluff City Backsliders - Lapsteel
- 2007 Black Francis Bluefinger - Producer
- 2011 Camino Deluxe Willamina E.P. - Guitar, Vocals
- 2014 The Sublimities Surf and Turf - Guitar

=== Compilations ===
- 2004 Pickathon 2004 (Song: Coal Black Mattie)
- 2006 Friends of Fahey: A John Fahey Tribute | Song: "How White's Restaurant Destroyed My Life"
- 2007 Drink to Bones That Turn to Dust: a Toast to Oingo Boingo | Song: "Who Do You Want To Be Today?"
