= Dog in the Sand =

Studio album by Frank Black and the Catholics
- Released: January 30, 2001
- Recorded: March 25–April 3, 2000
- Studio: Sound City Studios, Los Angeles, California
- Genre: Alternative rock
- Length: 47:30
- Label: Cooking Vinyl; What Are Records?
- Producer: Nick Vincent

Frank Black chronology
Oddballs (2000)	Dog in the Sand (2001)	Black Letter Days (2002)

Professional ratings
Aggregate scores
Source	Rating
Metacritic	73/100
Review scores
Source	Rating
AllMusic	4/5 stars
Alternative Press	6/10
The A.V. Club	B+
Encyclopedia of Popular Music	4/5 stars
Magnet	1.5/5 stars
Mojo	4/5 stars
NME	6/10
Pitchfork	7.8/10
The Rolling Stone Album Guide	3/5 stars
Wall of Sound	75/100

Dog in the Sand is Frank Black's third album with backing group the Catholics. It was released in 2001 by Cooking Vinyl in Europe and What Are Records? in the United States, and was produced by Nick Vincent. The album was generally met with favorable reviews. Though retaining the live-to-two-track method of recording of the previous two albums, this album found the band branching away from purely electric rock to incorporate acoustic guitar, pedal steel, and Rhodes Piano and Wurlitzer organ into the sonic template.

A notable change on the album is the induction of Black's former producer and keyboardist, Eric Drew Feldman, to the Catholics, a veteran of Captain Beefheart & His Magic Band and Pere Ubu. The album also features contributions from Moris Tepper (Captain Beefheart, Tom Waits) and Black's former Pixies bandmate Joey Santiago, as well as guitarist Dave Phillips, who would soon join the Catholics as a full-time member.

"When we got back to Los Angeles for a two week rehearsal (for the Dog in the Sand album), we added auxiliary guitarist Dave Philips, who was so good he ended up playing on every song," Black said.

The album was reissued by SpinART in 2003 including four bonus tracks.

== Track listing ==
All songs written by Frank Black.

1. "Blast Off" – 7:13
2. "I've Seen Your Picture" – 2:51
3. "St. Francis Dam Disaster" – 5:02
4. "Robert Onion" – 4:00
5. "Stupid Me" – 2:31
6. "Bullet" – 3:53
7. "The Swimmer" – 2:48
8. "Hermaphroditos" – 4:12
9. "I'll Be Blue" – 3:34
10. "Llano del Rio" – 4:14
11. "If It Takes All Night" – 3:19
12. "Dog in the Sand" – 3:48

2003 reissue bonus tracks

- "Robert Onion" (Acoustic)
- "Blast Off" (Acoustic)
- "Stupid Me" (Acoustic)
- "If It Takes All Night" (Acoustic)

== Personnel ==
Credits adapted from the album's liner notes.

Frank Black and the Catholics

- Frank Black – vocals, acoustic guitar, guitar
- Scott Boutier – drums
- Eric Drew Feldman – electric piano, piano, clavioline, vocals
- Rich Gilbert – guitar, pedal steel guitar, dobro, vocals
- David McCaffery – bass, vocals

Additional musicians

- Dave Phillips – acoustic guitar (tracks: 3, 5, 7, 9, 12), guitar (tracks: 1, 2, 4, 10, 11), pedal steel guitar (track 6), slide guitar (track 8), vocals (track 10)
- Joey Santiago – guitar (tracks 1, 4)
- Moris Tepper – banjo (track 3), vihuela (track 10), vocals (track 10)
- Nick Vincent – percussion (track 1)

Technical

- Nick Vincent – producer
- Billy Joe Bowers – recording engineer
- Mike Terry – assistant engineer
- Eddy Schreyer – mastering engineer
- Andrew Swainson – cover design
- Steve Gullick – photography
