= Pistolero (album) =

Studio album by Frank Black and the Catholics
- Released: March 9, 1999
- Recorded: Fall 1998
- Studio: Sound City Studios, Van Nuys, Los Angeles, California
- Genre: Alternative rock
- Length: 48:22
- Label: SpinART
- Producer: Nick Vincent

Frank Black chronology
Frank Black and the Catholics (1998)	Pistolero (1999)	Oddballs (2000)

Professional ratings
Review scores
Source	Rating
AllMusic	3/5 stars
The Encyclopedia of Popular Music	3/5 stars
Entertainment Weekly	A−
NME	5/10
Pitchfork	6.9/10
Q	2/5 stars
Rolling Stone	3/5 stars
The Rolling Stone Album Guide	2.5/5 stars

Pistolero is the second album by Frank Black and the Catholics, produced by Nick Vincent and released via spinART Records on March 9, 1999. It was recorded live, directly to a two track.

== Track listing ==
All tracks composed by Frank Black

1. "Bad Harmony" – 3:19
2. "I Switched You" – 5:21
3. "Western Star" – 3:12
4. "Tiny Heart" – 3:32
5. "You're Such a Wire" – 2:07
6. "I Love Your Brain" – 3:49
7. "Smoke Up" – 2:55
8. "Billy Radcliffe" – 2:24
9. "So Hard to Make Things Out" – 5:37
10. "85 Weeks" – 2:36
11. "I Think I'm Starting to Lose It" – 2:11
12. "I Want Rock & Roll" – 3:02
13. "Skeleton Man" – 3:12
14. "So. Bay" – 5:05
15. "Valley of Our Hope" – (Japanese bonus track) – 4:17

== Personnel ==
Credits adapted from the album's liner notes.

Frank Black and the Catholics

- Frank Black – vocals, guitar
- Scott Boutier – drums
- David McCaffery – bass, backing vocals
- Rich Gilbert – lead guitar, backing vocals

Technical

- Nick Vincent – producer
- Billy Joe Bowers – recording engineer
- Nick Raskulinecz – assistant engineer
- Eddy Schreyer – mastering engineer
- Inertia – design
