= Nick Vincent (musician) =

American drummer (born 1958)

Nicholas A. Vincent (born January 11 Harvey, Illinois) is an American rock and roll, jazz, and studio drummer, producer and composer. His sister is Holly Beth Vincent. He has performed and recorded with artists such as Frank Black, Donny & Marie, Art Garfunkel, John Fogerty, Carole King, Jackie DeShannon, Ann-Margret, Sparklehorse, Hilary Duff, Hanson, Charlotte Hatherley, Ian McLagan and Roger Miller.

Vincent has done steady television and film soundtrack work, including the films Sideways, Just Go with It, Grown Ups, Desperado and From Dusk till Dawn.

His tenure with Frank Black included playing on Frank Black, Teenager of the Year and The Cult of Ray, and producing the albums Pistolero, Dog in the Sand, Black Letter Days and Show Me Your Tears.

He has been a student of legendary drum teacher Freddie Gruber, and also attended University of North Texas from 1975 to 1978. Vincent has been a member of the bands Tito & Tarantula, the Surf Punks, and Chuck E. Weiss and the God Dam Liars.

In January/February of 2025, Nick Vincent took part with Frank Black in the "Teenager Of The Year" 30th-Anniversary tour, playing shows in the United States and Europe.

On October 24, 2025, Vincent, along with keyboard player Jordan Summers, was Musical Director for the Wild Honey Foundation concert "Join Me In L.A.: The Songs of Warren Zevon" at the United Theater, co-leading with Mr. Summers the Wild Honey Orchestra, and featuring numerous guest artists, including Jackson Browne, Jorge Calderón and numerous others.
