= Black Francis =

American musician (born 1965)

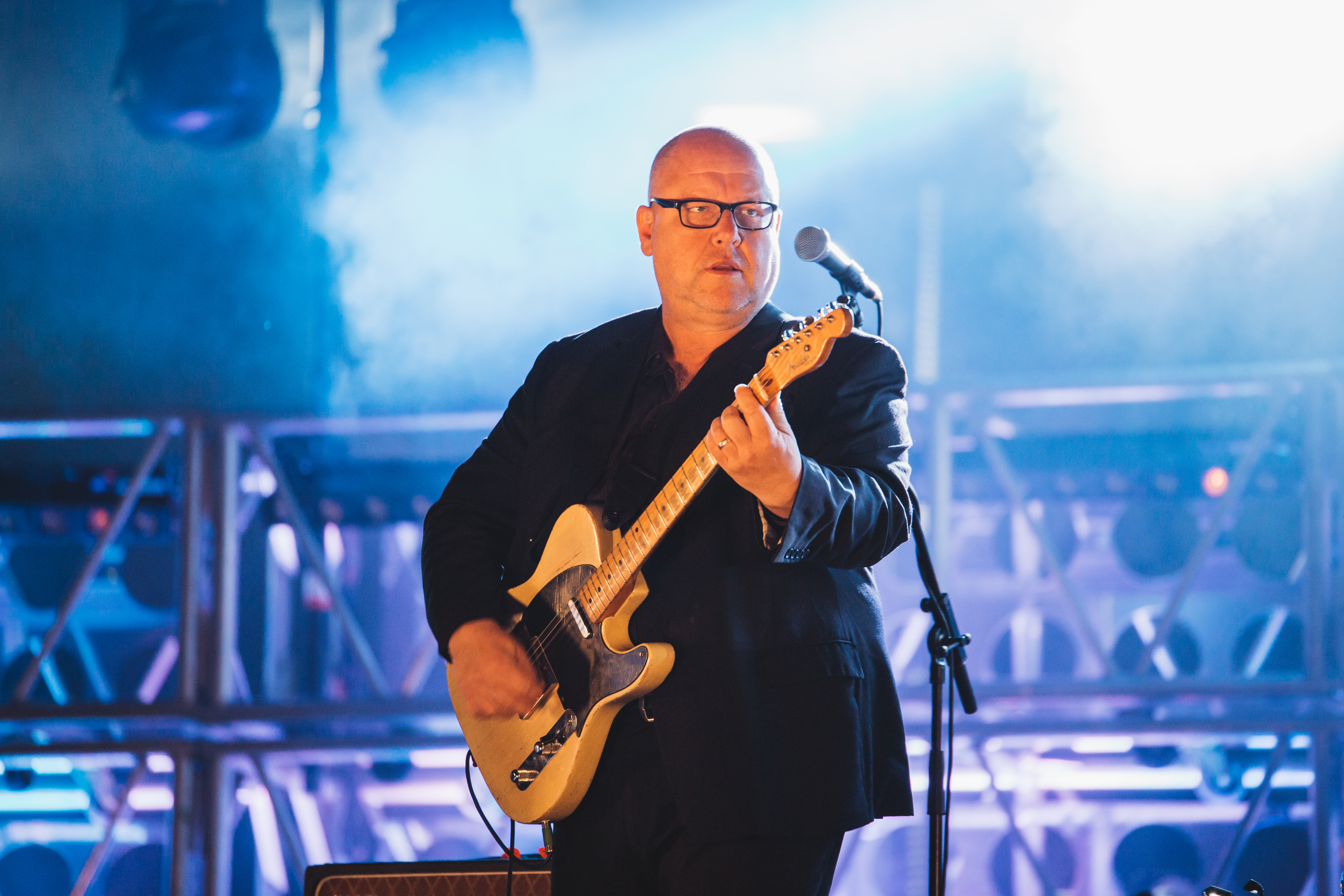
- Francis playing at Positivus Festival 2017

Background information
- Also known as: Frank Black
- Born: Charles Michael Kittridge Thompson IV; April 6, 1965 (age 61); Boston, Massachusetts, U.S.
- Genres: Alternative rock, indie rock, punk rock
- Occupations: Singer, musician, songwriter
- Instruments: Vocals, guitar
- Years active: 1986–present
- Labels: 4AD; American; Cooking Vinyl; Sonic Unyon; spinART; Demon
- Member of: Pixies; Frank Black and the Catholics
- Spouse: Rachel Phillips
- Website: blackfranc.is

Charles Michael Kittridge Thompson IV (born April 6, 1965), known professionally as Black Francis and formerly Frank Black, is an American singer, songwriter, and guitarist who is the lead vocalist of the alternative rock band Pixies. Following the band's breakup in 1993, he embarked on a solo career releasing fifteen albums and forming his band, the Catholics. Pixies regrouped in 2004, and he declared his solo career to be over in 2013.

His vocal style varies from a screaming, yowling delivery with Pixies to a more measured, melodic style in his solo career. His cryptic lyrics mostly explore unconventional subjects, such as surrealism, UFOs, and biblical violence, along with science fiction and surf culture. His use of atypical time signatures, loud–quiet dynamics, and distinct preference for live-to-two-track recording during his time with the Catholics have given him a distinct style within alternative rock.

== Biography ==
=== Youth and college ===
Charles Michael Kittridge Thompson IV was born in Boston, Massachusetts. His father was a bar owner. Thompson lived in Los Angeles, California, because his father wanted to "learn more about the restaurant and bar business". Thompson's parents introduced him to 1960s folk rock at a young age. His first guitar was his mother's, a Yamaha classical guitar bought with money from his father's bar tips, which he started to play at age "11 or 12".

Thompson's family moved around, first with his father, and then his stepfather, a religious man who "pursued real estate on both coasts"; his parents had separated twice by the time he was in first grade. When Thompson was 12, his mother and stepfather joined an evangelical church that was tied to the Pentecostal denomination Assemblies of God, a move that influenced many of his songs written with the Pixies, which often refer to the Bible.

He discovered the music of Christian rock singer-songwriter Larry Norman at 13 when Norman played at a religious summer camp that Thompson attended. Norman's music influenced Thompson to the extent that he titled the Pixies' first EP and a lyric in the band's song "Levitate Me" after one of Norman's catchphrases, "Come on, pilgrim!" Thompson later described the music he listened to during his youth:

I used to hang out with some misfits. [...] We were the 'we listen to odd-ball music' kids. I wasn't hanging out at all-ages shows or trying to get into clubs to see bands, and I was buying records at used records stores and borrowing them from the library. You just saw Emerson, Lake & Palmer records. So I didn't know [punk] music but I started to hear about it in high school. But it was probably a good thing that I didn't know it, that I instead listened to a lot of '60s records and this religious music.

Thompson lived in an apartment in Marblehead, Massachusetts. Just before his senior year, his family moved to Westport, Massachusetts, where he received a Teenager of the Year award—the title of a later solo album. During this time, Thompson composed several songs that appeared in his later career, including "Here Comes Your Man" from Doolittle, and "Velvety Instrumental Version".

After graduating from Westport High School in 1983, Thompson studied at the University of Massachusetts Amherst, majoring in anthropology. Thompson shared a room with another roommate for a semester before moving in with future Pixies guitarist Joey Santiago. The two shared an interest in rock music, and Santiago introduced Thompson to 1970s punk and the music of David Bowie; they began to jam together. It was at this time that Thompson discovered The Cars, a band he described as "very influential on me and the Pixies".

In his second year of college, Thompson embarked on a trip to San Juan, Puerto Rico, as part of an exchange program. He spent six months in an apartment with a "weird, psycho roommate" who later served as a direct inspiration for the Pixies song "Crackity Jones"; many of the band's early songs refer to Thompson's experiences in Puerto Rico. Thompson failed to learn to speak Spanish formally, and left his studies after debating whether he would go to New Zealand to view Halley's Comet (he later said it "seemed like the cool romantic thing to do at the time"), or start a rock band. He wrote a letter urging Santiago, with the words "we gotta do it, now is the time, Joe", to join him in a band upon his return to Boston.

=== Pixies ===
Soon after returning to Massachusetts, Thompson dropped out of college, and moved to Boston with Santiago. He spent 1985 working in a warehouse, "managing buttons on teddy bears", composing songs on his acoustic guitar, and writing lyrics on the subway. In January 1986, Thompson formed Pixies with Santiago. Bassist Kim Deal was recruited a week later via a classified advertisement placed in a Boston paper, which requested a bassist "into Hüsker Dü and Peter, Paul and Mary". Drummer David Lovering was later hired on recommendation from Deal's husband.

"U-Mass"
is the sixth track from Trompe le Monde. This sample contains the end of the first verse and the chorus.

In 1987 Pixies released an 18-track demo tape, commonly referred to as The Purple Tape. Thompson's father assisted the band financially, lending $1,000 in order to record the demo tape; Thompson later said that his father "wasn't around for a lot of my younger years, so I think he was doing his best to make up for lost time". The Purple Tape led to a recording contract with the English independent record label 4AD. For the release of the mini album Come On Pilgrim, Thompson adopted the alias "Black Francis", a name inspired by his father: "he had been saving that name in case he had another son".

In 1988 Pixies recorded their debut album Surfer Rosa. Thompson wrote and sang on all the tracks, with the exception of the single "Gigantic", which was co-written and sung by Deal. To support the album, the band undertook a European tour, during which Thompson met Eric Drew Feldman, a later collaborator on Pixies and solo albums. Doolittle, with Thompson-penned songs such as "Debaser" and "Monkey Gone To Heaven", was released the following year to widespread critical acclaim. However, by this time, tensions between Thompson and Deal, combined with exhaustion, led the band to announce a hiatus. Thompson has an aversion to flying, and spent this time driving across America with his girlfriend, Jean Walsh (whom he had met in the band's early days), performing solo shows in order to raise funds to buy furniture for his new Los Angeles apartment.

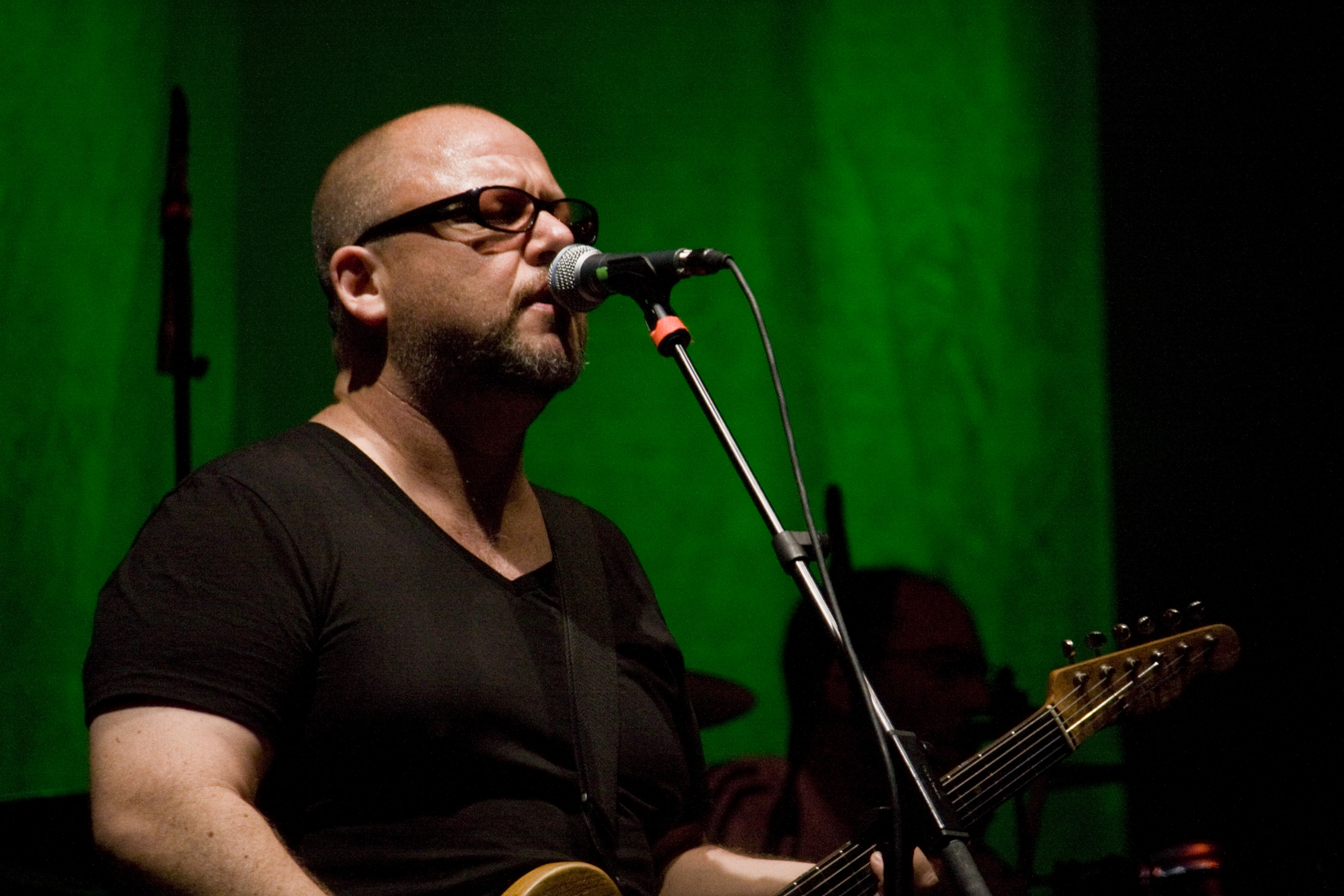
Black Francis with the Pixies in Barcelona.

The band reconvened in 1990, and recorded two further albums: 1990's Bossanova and 1991's Trompe le Monde; the latter was Thompson's first collaboration with Feldman. The later Pixies albums were characterized by Feldman's increasing influence on the band's output, as well as a focus on science fiction themes, including aliens and UFOs. These themes would continue to be explored throughout his early solo work. Trompe le Monde includes the song "U-Mass", which was written about the university he attended as a youth, and due to the keyboard part played by Feldman, signified a move away from the band's alternative rock sound. Although Deal had contributed on the songs "Gigantic" (from Surfer Rosa) and "Silver" (from Doolittle), from Bossanova on, Thompson wrote all the band's original material. This contributed to the increasing tension between him and Deal, and the Pixies broke up in 1992; this was not publicly announced until early 1993.

=== Early solo career ===
While Pixies' 1991 album Trompe le Monde was being recorded, Thompson had discussions with the album's producer, Gil Norton, about a possible solo record. He told Norton he was keen to record again, even though he had no new material; as a result, the two decided on a cover album. However, by the time Thompson visited a recording studio again in 1992, he had "plenty of tunes and musical scraps".

He collaborated with Feldman to record new material; they began by trimming down the number of covers to one, The Beach Boys' "Hang On to Your Ego". Feldman became the album's producer, and played keyboard and bass guitar on several songs, with Santiago featuring on lead guitar and Nick Vincent on drums. Francis recorded the album during the hiatus and breakup of Pixies in late 1992 and early 1993. He then adopted the stage name "Frank Black" (inverting his old persona "Black Francis") and released the results as Frank Black in March 1993. Frank Black was characterized by a focus on UFOs and science fiction, although he explored other subjects, such as in "I Heard Ramona Sing", a song about the Ramones. The album was similar in style, both musically and lyrically, to the Pixies' albums Bossanova and Trompe le Monde. Feldman later said that the first record connected his solo career with Trompe le Monde, "but at the same time it is an island, like nothing else he [Black] did".

The following year, Black released his second solo record, a 22-song double album entitled Teenager of the Year. Teenager included the song "Headache" (sample), a moderate success on alternative rock playlists; critics described the song as "irresistible pop". The production of Teenager of the Year was markedly different from Frank Black; in the previous album, MIDI templates were used when writing songs, but in Teenager, Black showed individual parts to band members, the core of which included drummer Vincent and Lyle Workman on lead guitar. Feldman noted that Thompson's songwriting became "a lot more spontaneous" while recording the album. Thompson had begun to stray from his style with Pixies, writing songs that covered a variety of genres and topics, and his new-found method of recording was closer to later albums than that of Frank Black and Trompe le Monde.

Both Frank Black and Teenager of the Year were critically well received, although they enjoyed limited commercial success. In 1995, Thompson left his long-time labels 4AD and Elektra. In 1996, he released The Cult of Ray on Rick Rubin's American Recordings; the album marked a turn away from the elaborate production of his first solo works and was recorded primarily live with few overdubs. His band for this album featured sole Teenager holdover Lyle Workman on lead guitar, along with bassist David McCaffrey and Scott Boutier on drums. Though the album was neither critically nor commercially successful, its stripped-down approach would increasingly define Thompson's working methods for the next several years.

=== Frank Black and the Catholics ===
Thompson dubbed his new band "Frank Black and the Catholics" and recorded their eponymous first album in 1997. Recorded live-to-two-track initially as merely a demo, he was so pleased with the results that he decided to release the sessions with no further production. The album was delayed for over a year by conflicts at American, both internal and over its production, and was ultimately released in late 1998 by SpinArt Records in the US. Since leaving American Recordings, Black has avoided long-term contracts with labels, and has maintained ownership of his album masters, licensing each album individually for release.

Frank Black and the Catholics became the first album to be posted to the eMusic service; they claim it is "the first album ever made legally available for commercial download". Critical reception to the album was mixed, with some writers noting Thompson's seemingly deliberate turn away from the "quirkiness" of the Pixies and his early solo work for a self-consciously straightforward approach, and the "disappointingly straightforward punk-pop" musical style present on the album.

He would continue to eschew multi-track recording for the live-to-two-track technique for all subsequent releases under the group name. Live-to-two-track recording precludes the use of overdubs to correct errors or add texture; all takes are recorded continuously, and mixing is done "on the fly". On later albums, he incorporated more musicians into the sessions to allow for more varied instrumental textures. Explaining his rationale behind the method, he commented:

Well, it's real. It's a recording of a performance, of a real performance between a group of people, an entourage, a band, as opposed to a facsimile of that, which is frequently what people do with multi-track recording ... I prefer it. It's a little more real. It's got a little more heart.

Workman left the Catholics in 1998 to pursue session and sideman work; Rich Gilbert was added to the band to replace him. Frank Black and the Catholics released Pistolero in 1999 and Dog in the Sand in 2001. Dog in the Sand added Dave Philips on pedal steel guitar and lead guitar, and Santiago and Feldman began making occasional appearances with the group live and on record.

By this time, while dismissing the possibility of a Pixies reunion, Thompson had begun to incorporate an increasing number of the band's songs into Catholics concerts, as well as including Santiago in his solo work again. Black and the Catholics continued to release records; two separate albums, Black Letter Days and Devil's Workshop, were released simultaneously in 2002. Devil's Workshop included the song "Velvety" (sample), a version of the Pixies song "Velvety Instrumental Version" that Black wrote as a teenager, with lyrics. The song was one of the first signs that he had acknowledged his past work with the Pixies in his solo output. A sixth album with the Catholics, Show Me Your Tears, was released in 2003. Show Me Your Tears' title and many of the songs in it were inspired by Thompson's recent divorce and entry into therapy.

=== Pixies reunion, Nashville and the return of Black Francis ===
In late 2003, following long-standing rumors, an official announcement was made that the Pixies were rehearsing for a reunion tour. The band played publicly for the first time in 12 years in April 2004, and went on to tour extensively throughout the U.S., Canada and Europe in the same year. They also recorded one of Deal's compositions, "Bam Thwok", which was released on the iTunes Music Store. Frank Black Francis, a double album bridging the gap between his two personas, was released to coincide with the Pixies reunion tour. The first disc consisted of solo demos of Pixies songs recorded the day before The Purple Tape was recorded, and the second contained studio collaborations, again of Pixies songs, with Two Pale Boys.

Also in 2004, Thompson began to collaborate with a group of Nashville session musicians, including Steve Cropper, Spooner Oldham, Reggie Young, and Anton Fig, as well as producer Jon Tiven. In July 2005, the collective released Honeycomb under the Frank Black name, to generally favorable reviews. Entertainment Weekly described the album as "spare, graceful, [and] in the pocket", while Billboard noted it as "One of [Thompson's] finest hours". A second volume of Nashville sessions, a double album entitled Fast Man Raider Man, was released in June 2006. Thompson appeared at a concert by Christian rock pioneer Larry Norman in June 2005 in Salem, Oregon. Norman and Thompson performed a duet on "Watch What You're Doing", which later appeared on Norman's album, Live at The Elsinore.

Thompson continued to tour with the Pixies through 2005 and 2006. Though the Catholics were effectively defunct, they released two separate albums of B-sides and rarities, Snake Oil and One More Road for the Hit, on iTunes, with an eye towards a future CD release. Thompson was also working on more new solo material with Feldman in the first part of 2006, some of which they performed live. In the fall of 2006, Thompson began his first solo tour since 2003, taking Feldman, Billy Block, and Duane Jarvis along as his backing band. In October 2006, Thompson announced plans for the Pixies to start rehearsing and recording a new album in January 2007, but it is believed that no recording took place because of the reluctance of another member of the Pixies to commit to the project. In December 2006, he released the compilation Christmass album; a collection of new studio tracks, hotel room sessions, and live acoustic recordings from a solo tour the previous summer.

A Frank Black "best of" compilation, Frank Black 93-03, was released in June 2007. Concurrently with that release, Thompson undertook a European tour with a new band, featuring Salem's Guards of Metropolis members Jason Carter and Charles Normal, as well as bassist Simon "Ding" Archer. For this tour, Thompson eschewed his usual rhythm guitar role and performed solely as a frontman and singer. In September 2007, a new album entitled Bluefinger was released under his former stage name of Black Francis. For this album, he was inspired by the life and works of Herman Brood, a Dutch musician and artist. He also released a new "mini-album" entitled Svn Fngrs as Black Francis in March 2008.

In February 2008, Thompson was taken away by the Irish police in Dublin, Ireland, after staging an impromptu "precore" acoustic solo gig at St. Stephen's Green. He was not arrested, but briefly detained and removed to disperse the crowd of 1,000. He was released and performed that night in Vicar Street as planned. However, a similar event planned for London was prevented by police and had to be re-arranged for a small indoor venue.

As of 2025, Thompson lived in Massachusetts with his wife, Rachel Phillips.

Thompson has three children with ex-wife Violet Clark, and she had two children from previous relationships. The couple formerly lived in Eugene, Oregon, where they met. Thompson and Clark formerly composed the band Grand Duchy, which was active from 2008-2012. Their debut album, Petit Fours, was released in February 2009.

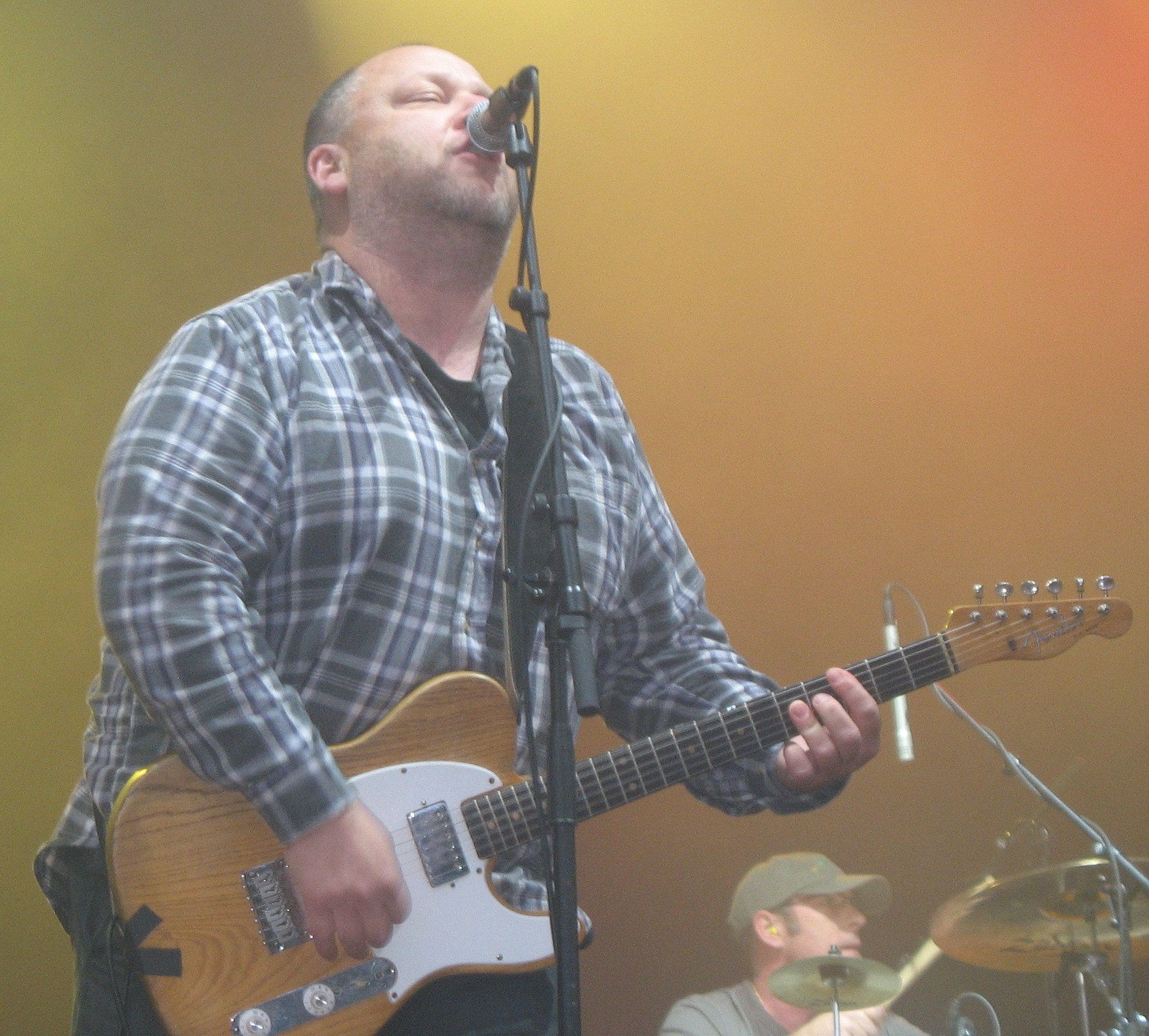
Francis performing in Stockholm, 2009

In 2008, Black produced Art Brut's third album, Art Brut vs. Satan, which was released the following year. Black gave several joint interviews with frontman Eddie Argos about the album, and Art Brut supported the Pixies at their 2009 Brixton Academy show. In 2010, Black worked with the group a second time on their album Brilliant! Tragic!.

Black Francis released NonStopErotik in March 2010 and contributed the song "I Heard Ramona Sing" to the soundtrack for the film Scott Pilgrim vs. the World released in August 2010.

In the fall of 2010 in Nashville, Thompson recorded an album of new songs written and performed with collaborator Reid Paley, as Paley & Francis (Reid Paley & Black Francis). The debut Paley & Francis album (also titled Paley & Francis) was produced by Jon Tiven, and features Reid Paley and Black Francis on guitars and vocals, accompanied by Muscle Shoals legends Spooner Oldham on piano and David Hood on bass. The album was released in October 2011 on Sonic Unyon in North America, and on Cooking Vinyl in the UK & Europe.

Paley & Francis debuted live in early September 2011 with club performances in Albany NY, Buffalo NY, and Hamilton, Ontario, and as one of the headliners of the Supercrawl Festival. The band for these performances consisted of Reid Paley and Black Francis on guitars and vocals, Eric Eble on bass, and Dave Varriale on drums. The pair toured again from February 8 to 22, 2013, with the shows including solo performances by each artist.

Black Francis contributed, in 2011, to the Ray Davies album of collaborations, "See My Friends", with his cover of the Kinks tune "This Is Where I Belong".

Black Francis performed at The Coach House Concert Hall in San Juan Capistrano, California, on March 22, 2013. The Pixies, minus original bassist Kim Deal, reunited for a United States and world tour in 2014 and have subsequently released five additional studio albums: Indie Cindy (2014), Head Carrier (2016), Beneath the Eyrie (2019), Doggerel (2022) and The Night the Zombies Came (2024).

== Musical style ==
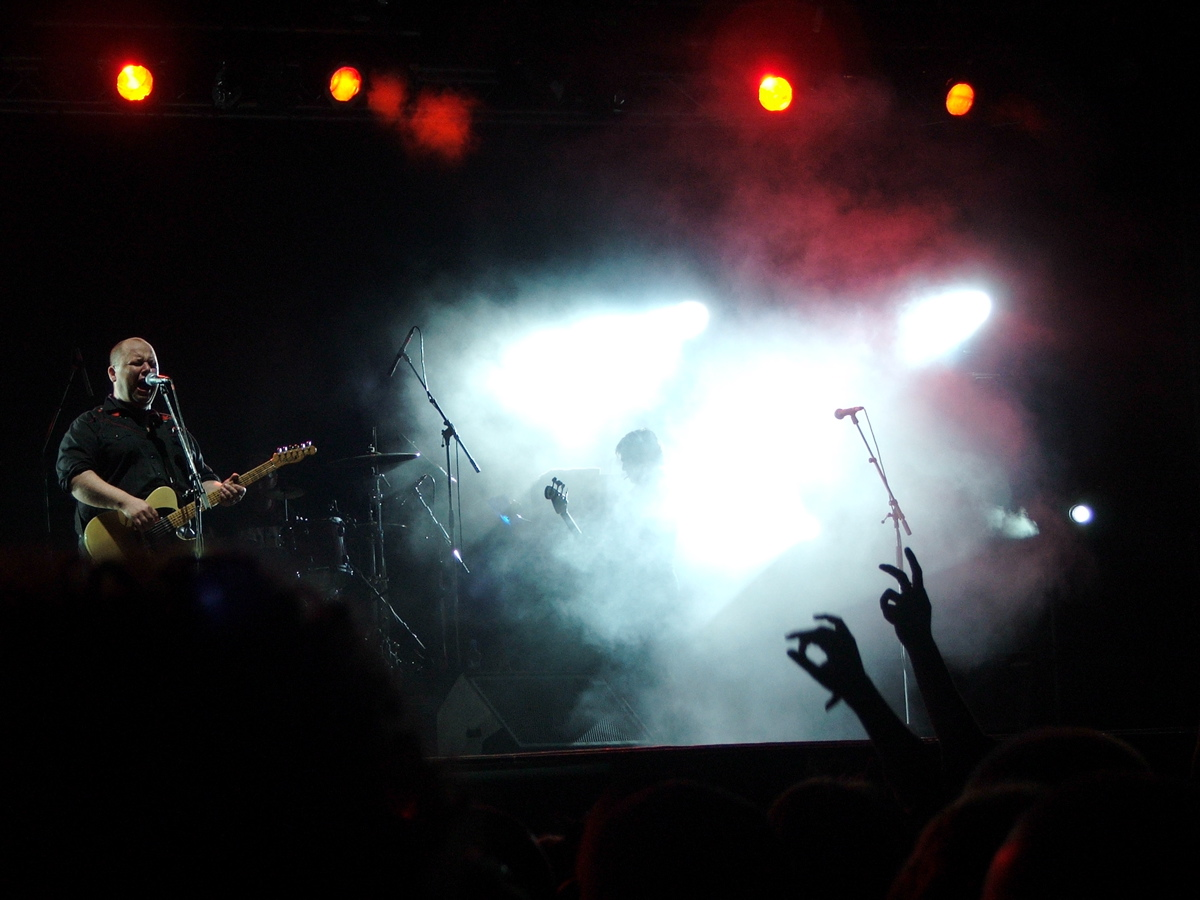
Thompson's singing style was critical in creating the sound of Pixies.

Over the course of his career, Thompson's musical style has grown to encompass a large number of genres; however, he is considered to produce rock or alternative rock compositions. Whereas songs such as "Here Comes Your Man" (Doolittle), "Velvety" (Devil's Workshop) and "Headache" (Teenager of the Year) expose a more light rock side, others such as "Something Against You" (Surfer Rosa) and "Thalassocracy" (Teenager of the Year) hint to a more heavy rock influence in his material. A strong country music influence is also increasingly evident in his style, most notably in his Nashville albums, Honeycomb and Fast Man Raider Man.

Thompson has said that he acquired his vocal style as a teenager, when a Thai neighbor asked him to sing "Oh! Darling" by The Beatles (from their album Abbey Road) and to "Scream it like you hate that bitch!" Thompson's powerful screams were a signature of Pixies albums, along with the band's typical song structure of quietly paced verses followed by thundering chorus lines and repetitive guitar staccato.

The Fender Telecaster is Thompson's preferred electric guitar, but he occasionally uses a Gibson SG. He uses Martin acoustic guitars.

=== Influences ===
Thompson has drawn influence from a number of musical genres. As a teenager, he mostly listened to 1960s folk and religious music, including the Christian singer-songwriter Larry Norman. For playing on his junior high baseball team, he was given Leon Russell's 1970 debut album, which he says influenced some of his vocalizing. Later in high school and in college, he discovered punk music (Black Flag), along with bands from other genres, such as the new wave band The Cars and the obscure Angst. While in Boston in 1984, before starting the Pixies, he listened to Elvis Costello's This Year's Model, Hüsker Dü's Zen Arcade, The Spotlight Kid by Captain Beefheart, and I'm Sick of You, an Iggy Pop bootleg. Thompson was also greatly influenced by the Beatles self-titled 1968 release with regards to the experimental nature of his compositions.

Thompson's lyrics have also featured references to the Bible, especially in his career with the Pixies; most notably in the incestuous tale of Nimrod in "Nimrod's Son", the stories of Uriah and Bathsheba in "Dead", Samson in "Gouge Away" and references to the Tower of Babel in songs such as "Build High" and "Old Black Dawning". He cited surrealist films Eraserhead and Un Chien Andalou as major influences on his work with the Pixies ("In Heaven" is a cover song from the former, and the title of the latter appears in "Debaser"); however, surrealism was less of an influence in his solo career. He commented on these influences (which he paid tribute to most in the Pixies' Doolittle), saying he "didn't have the patience to sit around reading Surrealist novels", but found it easier to watch 20-minute films.

=== Songwriting and lyrics ===
During his stay in Puerto Rico, Thompson acquired a moderately fluent grasp of Spanish, although informal and at times incorrect, which he has continued throughout his career. Several early Pixies songs, including "Isla de Encanta" and "Vamos", reference his experiences in San Juan, and the lyrics are often heavily seasoned with the island's slang. The island's influence in his work is most notable in the song "Isla De Encanta", named after the island's motto, "Isla Del Encanto". Other Pixies songs drawn from his experiences there include "Vamos" (Come On Pilgrim), "Oh My Golly!", "Where Is My Mind?" (Surfer Rosa), "Crackity Jones" (Doolittle) and the B-side "Bailey's Walk". Several of his songs contain Spanish lyrics, most notably in the Pixies' first album, Come On Pilgrim, and a Spanish translation of "Evil Hearted You" by The Yardbirds. From his later works with the Pixies onwards, his use of Spanish drifted westward, reflecting places and aspects of the state of California and its culture.

Thompson's lyrics are noted for their obscure references to off-beat topics such as outer space, UFOs, and The Three Stooges—the last of these being the subject of "Two Reelers", a song from Teenager of the Year. Lyrics with a focus on science fiction were particularly prominent on the later Pixies records, as well as his early solo albums. With the Catholics, his lyrics have tended towards historical topics; for example, the song "St. Francis Dam Disaster" (from Dog in the Sand) details the catastrophic collapse of the St. Francis Dam near Los Angeles in March 1928, and the All My Ghosts EP featured an account of the Humboldt County Massacre of Wiyot Indians in 1860 near Eureka, California.

== Television appearances and videos ==
Thompson has appeared on a range of television shows solo and as part of the Pixies, ranging from 120 Minutes and The Late Show in the United States, to The Word in the UK.

As part of the Pixies, he was reluctant to film music videos for singles. Elektra Records' Peter Lubin said "to get videos out of them was a major ... undertaking and it only got worse over time, because Thompson refused to lip-sync;. The video for "Here Comes Your Man" mocks the practice by showing Thompson and Deal opening their mouths as the vocals are being heard.

In his early solo career as Frank Black, his videos were more professional; he became more willing to take part in them. "Los Angeles" is an example; the video shows Thompson riding across a desert on a hovercraft. They Might Be Giants' John Flansburgh, who directed the "Los Angeles" video, later commented on the change in Black's attitude to music videos:

I think the Pixies had made enough anti-videos that Charles was ready to do things that were more visually hopped up. The "Los Angeles" video that we did, the last minute and a half of the song is this open field of grey over which hovercrafts are floating. It's about as tripped up as any video I've ever been involved in, and it was also realizing a dream of Charles', getting him in a hovercraft.

Thompson has released few music videos since leaving 4AD, one being a low-budget video in Germany for Dog in the Sand's "Robert Onion". The last widely released video produced for his solo material was for "Men in Black", from Cult of Ray.

In 2013, Thompson appeared in a video promoting McSweeney's children's book Lost Sloth.

In October 2024, Thompson appeared on the BBC children’s channel CBeebies in the bedtime story slot reading There Was A Young Zombie Who Swallowed A Worm by Kaye Bailey.

== Discography ==
=== Studio albums ===
- Frank Black (1993)
- Teenager of the Year (1994)
- The Cult of Ray (1996)
- Frank Black and the Catholics (1998)
- Pistolero (1999)
- Sunday Sunny Mill Valley Groove Day (2000, unreleased)
- Dog in the Sand (2001)
- Black Letter Days (2002)
- Devil's Workshop (2002)
- Show Me Your Tears (2003)
- Frank Black Francis (2004)
- Honeycomb (2005)
- Fast Man Raider Man (2006)
- Christmass (2006)
- Bluefinger (2007)
- Svn Fngrs (EP) (2008)
- The Golem (2010)
- NonStopErotik (2010)
- Paley & Francis (2011) (with Reid Paley)

=== Pixies ===
- Come On Pilgrim (1987)
- Surfer Rosa (1988)
- Doolittle (1989)
- Bossanova (1990)
- Trompe le Monde (1991)
- Indie Cindy (2014)
- Head Carrier (2016)
- Beneath the Eyrie (2019)
- Doggerel (2022)
- The Night the Zombies Came (2024)

== Bibliography ==
- Frank, Josh; Ganz, Caryn. (2005). Fool the World: The Oral History of a Band Called Pixies. Virgin Books. ISBN 0-312-34007-9.
- Sisario, Ben. (2006). Doolittle. Continuum, 33 1/3 series. ISBN 0-8264-1774-4.
