= Eric Drew Feldman =

American keyboard and bass guitar player (born 1955)

- Also known as: Black Jew Kitabu
- Born: Eric Drew Feldman; April 16, 1955 (age 71); Los Angeles, California
- Instruments: Piano; keyboards; bass; optigan; mellotron; minimoog; vocals; drums
- Years active: 1976-present

Eric Drew Feldman (born April 16, 1955) is an American musician. Feldman has worked with Captain Beefheart, Fear, Snakefinger, The Residents, Pere Ubu, Pixies, dEUS, Katell Keineg, Frank Black, The Polyphonic Spree, Tripping Daisy, Reid Paley, Charlotte Hatherley, Custard and PJ Harvey.

== Biography ==
In the 1970s, Feldman studied at UCLA under Philip Springer, a pop songwriter and early pioneer of electronic music and synthesizers.

=== The Magic Band (1976 - 1982) ===
When Feldman joined Captain Beefheart's Magic Band in 1976 as keyboardist and bassist, he was already an experienced musician. Like other members of the band, Feldman was expected to capture (on tape or notepad) Beefheart's musical ideas. Once instrumental parts had been created, the band members had to play them exactly as composed: "I never had a problem with that. I felt like I was getting parts dictated to me from one of the best, especially when they were designed for me. You just feel like a model in a fashion show wearing a really nice dress, I guess." During his time in the Magic Band, he was also given a nickname by Don, Black Jew Kitabu. Feldman worked on the acclaimed trio of Beefheart albums in the late 1970s and early 1980s - Shiny Beast (Bat Chain Puller) (1978), Doc at the Radar Station (1980), and Ice Cream for Crow (1982).

=== Snakefinger's Vestal Virgins (1982 - 1987) ===
Feldman first became aware of Snakefinger and The Residents in 1979 while living in Los Angeles. He was given a mixtape (likely the compilation album Nibbles) which featured The Spot by Snakefinger and Ship's A Going Down by The Residents, which he became interested in. Shortly afterwards he moved to San Francisco, just four blocks away from the Ralph Records headquarters. Aware of the address' significance, Feldman visited out of curiosity. The Residents were familiar with Feldman's work with Captain Beefheart and, although he came to work with The Residents, introduced him to Snakefinger. Having produced Snakefinger's first two albums, The Residents wanted Snakefinger to branch out, and saw Feldman as the perfect collaborator. Feldman worked with Snakefinger on two studio albums before his death in 1987.

In May 1984, Feldman collaborated with Steve LeGrand of the band Times Beach to compose and perform the score to Sam Shepard's The Tooth of Crime in an acclaimed production at the Berkeley Repertory Theatre.

=== Pere Ubu (1988 - 1991) ===
After working with The Residents' Snakefinger, in 1988 Feldman was drafted in to replace departing Pere Ubu keyboard player Allen Ravenstine. He worked on their album Worlds in Collision (1991).

=== Black Francis (1991 - 1994) ===
Feldman met the Pixies' Frank Black in 1991, when Pere Ubu were touring as the Pixies' opening act, and later played keyboards on the Pixies' Trompe le Monde (1991) and toured with them. He can also be seen in the video for "Alec Eiffel". Feldman's brother Jef also played on the song "Space (I Believe In)" from the same record and was the inspiration behind its lyrics. After the Pixies split, Feldman worked with Frank Black on his solo albums Frank Black (1993) and Teenager of the Year (1994), producing, arranging and also playing bass and keyboards.

In 1994, after two Frank Black albums, Feldman applied for a job with PJ Harvey, who was putting together a band. He played on Is This Desire? (1998), White Chalk (2007), the PJ Harvey/John Parish album A Woman A Man Walked By (2009), and has regularly toured with her. His band kNIFE & fORK has opened for her.

While in Australia touring with Frank Black, he met the Australian band Custard. He recorded two albums with them in the U.S.: Wisenheimer (1995) and We Have the Technology (1996).

In 1996, he produced In a Bar, Under the Sea by Belgian band dEUS. Two years later, he produced Jesus Hits Like the Atom Bomb by Dallas group Tripping Daisy. He later produced Together We're Heavy (2004) by The Polyphonic Spree, a 24-member troupe containing three ex-members of Tripping Daisy. He also produced the album Revival (2000) by Brooklyn singer-songwriter (and sometime Frank Black songwriting collaborator) Reid Paley.

Through the 1990s Feldman continued to tour on and off with Frank Black and the Catholics and joined the band in the studio to make Dog in the Sand, Black Letter Days, Devil's Workshop, and Show Me Your Tears, as well producing the unreleased album Sunday Sunny Mill Valley Groove Day. In the song "85 Weeks" from 1999's Pistolero, Frank Black retells a story about Captain Beefheart as told to Black and other band members by Feldman (the opening lines of "Once Eric said, 'Come gather 'round. I'll tell a tale that is sure to astound'" make a clear reference to Feldman). Since Feldman did not participate in the production of Pistolero the incident may date back to an earlier recording session.

On April 25, 2008, Feldman performed live with Black Francis at the San Francisco International Film Festival at the Castro Theatre. Black Francis and his band performed the original score The Golem, which Feldman produced, for the 1920 silent movie The Golem: How He Came into the World. In 2009 he co-produced and played on a new collaboration entitled NonStopErotik, released March 2010. They toured together briefly as a three-piece to support the album.'

In 2013, Feldman mixed and played keyboards on Matthew Edwards and the Unfortunates album The Fates and single Minotaur. He also played keyboards on their album Folklore (2017).

=== The Residents (2002 - 2003, 2015 - Present) ===
In 2002, Feldman was invited to replace founding member and keyboardist Hardy Fox on The Residents' Demons Dance Alone tour, to which he accepted. They had asked to work with him on one previous occasion, but had to pass due to scheduling conflicts. The Demons Dance Alone tour lasted from October 2002 to September 2003. Following the tour, Feldman was not invited back to play with the group, due to it being more cost-efficient to keep Fox as the on stage keyboardist.

Twelve years later, in 2015, Hardy had decided to retire from The Residents for good. In reaction to this, the group invited Feldman to replace him. Feldman has performed on The Residents' Shadowland (2015 - 2016), In Between Dreams (2017 - 2019), God In Three Persons (2019 - 2020), and Faceless Forever (2023) live shows, and has produced three albums by the group, The Ghost of Hope (2017), Intruders (2018) and Metal Meat & Bone (2020)
